= List of Tanzanian writers =

This is a list of Tanzanian writers.

- Agoro Anduru (1948–1992), short story writer^{[Killam & Rowe]}
- Mark Behr (1963–2015), fiction writer also connected with South Africa
- Nahida Esmail, writer of short stories and social activist
- Abdulrazak Gurnah (born 1948), novelist and critic^{[Gikandi]} ^{[Killam & Rowe]}
- Ebrahim N. Hussein (born 1943), playwright, essayist, poet and translator^{[Gikandi]} ^{[Gikandi & Mwangi]} ^{[Killam & Rowe]}
- Prince Kagwema (born 1931), novelist^{[Killam & Rowe]}
- Euphrase Kezilahabi (1944–2020), novelist, poet and scholar
- Jacqueline Kibacha, social justice poet and activist
- Aniceti Kitereza (1896–1981), novelist
- Elieshi Lema (born 1949), novelist, children's author and publisher
- Amandina Lihamba (born 1944), playwright
- Richard Mabala, writer of short stories, Columnist and poet (1949– )
- Joseph Marwa, novelist, poet and actor (1999– )
- Jacqueline Massawe, poet
- Ismael R. Mbise, novelist and academic^{[Gikandi]}
- Penina Mlama (born 1948), playwright
- Fadhy Mtanga (born 1981) novelist, poet and photographer
- Sandra A. Mushi (born 1974), fiction writer, poet
- Elvis Musiba (died 2010), businessman and Swahili novelist
- Godfrey Mwakikagile (born 1949), writer and specialist in African studies
- Christopher Mwashinga (born 1965), poet, Christian non-fiction writer, and essayist
- Ras Nas, musician and poet
- Julius Nyerere (1922–1999), politician and writer^{[Gikandi & Mwangi]}
- Peter Palangyo (1939–1993), novelist^{[Gikandi]} ^{[Gikandi & Mwangi]} ^{[Killam & Rowe]}
- Hammie Rajab, Swahili novelist
- Shaaban Robert (1909–1962), Swahili novelist and poet^{[Gikandi]}
- Emily Ruete (1844–1924), Princess of Zanzibar
- Gabriel Ruhumbika (born 1938), novelist and short story writer^{[Gikandi]} ^{[Killam & Rowe]}
- Edwin Semzaba, novelist, playwright, actor and director
- Robert Bin Shaaban (1902–1962), poet, author and essayist
- Shafi Adam Shafi, Swahili novelist
- Eric Shigongo (born 1969), novelist, media entrepreneur, and politician
- Erica Sugo Anyadike, writer of short stories
- Nancy Sumari, children's book author and publisher
- Hussein Issa Tuwa, Swahili novelist and award-winning author

== See also ==
- Tanzanian literature
- List of African writers by country
- List of Tanzanians
