= Tanzanian literature =

Up to the second half of the 20th century, Tanzanian literature was primarily oral. Major oral literary forms include folktales, poems, riddles, proverbs, and songs. The majority of the oral literature in Tanzania that has been recorded is in Swahili, though each of the country's languages has its own oral tradition. The country's oral literature is currently declining because of social changes that make transmission of oral literature more difficult and because of the devaluation of oral literature that has accompanied Tanzania's development. Tanzania's written literary tradition has produced relatively few writers and works; Tanzania does not have a strong reading culture, and books are often expensive and hard to come by. Most Tanzanian literature is orally performed or written in Swahili, and a smaller number of works have been published in English. Major figures in Tanzanian modern literature include Shaaban Robert, Muhammed Said Abdulla, Aniceti Kitereza, Ebrahim Hussein, Abdulrazak Gurnah, and Penina Muhando.

== Literature in Swahili and other languages ==
One of the most prominent Swahili writers in Tanzania was Shaaban Robert (1909-1962), a poet, novelist and essayist. His works include Maisha yangu (My Life) and the poem Utenzi wa Vita vya Uhuru (An Epic in the War for Freedom). Muhammed Said Abdulla (1918-1991) was a prominent novelist, who particularly wrote detective stories.

Aniceti Kitereza (1896–1981), whose novel Myombekere na Bugonoka na Ntulanalwo na Bulihwali was written in his native language Kikerewe and later translated to Swahili, German, English and French.

Other Swahili-language authors from Tanzania include poets Mathias E. Mnyampala (1917–1969) and Euphrase Kezilahabi (1944–2020), novelists Shafi Adam Shafi, Fadhy Mtanga, Hussein Issa Tuwa, Maundu Mwingizi, Changas Mwangalela, Joseph Mbele, as well as playwrights Ebrahim Hussein, Penina Muhando or Amandina Lihamba.

An important genre of Swahili poetry are the lyrics of Taarab songs. These lyrics, that cross the genre boundaries between oral literature and Swahili music, are called wimbo, referring to poetry composed to be sung.

Dinosaurs of Tendaguru (original title: Dinosaria wa Tendaguru) is a story for young readers that combines both fiction and natural history, focussing on the discovery and subsequent excavations of dinosaur fossils at Tendaguru hill in Lindi Region of South Eastern Tanzania. It was written in Swahili by natural scientists Cassian Magori and Charles Saanane, with illustrations by the German graphic artist Thomas Thiemeyer.

== Literature in English ==
Some Tanzanian authors write in English rather than in Swahili. The first Tanzanian novel to appear in English was Peter Palangyo's Dying in the Sun (1968), which is considered to be one of the compelling works of modernism in African writing from this period.

The following year, novelist and academic Gabriel Ruhumbika published Village in Uhuru. Other English-language writers include short-story writer Marti Mollel.

In 2021, British writer Abdulrazak Gurnah, who was born in 1948 in the Sultanate of Zanzibar and emigrated to the United Kingdom in 1960, was awarded the Nobel Prize in Literature. His novels written in English explore "the impact of colonialism on East African identity, and the experiences of refugees as they are forced to seek homes elsewhere." His novels had been shortlisted before for both the Booker Prize and the Commonwealth Writers Prize. His best-known works include Paradise (1994), Desertion (2005) and Afterlives (2020).

In Tanzania, however, his work was largely unknown before he became a Nobel laureate. The first Swahili translation of his novel Paradise, titled Peponi, was done by Ida Hadjivayanis, an academic at the School of Oriental and African Studies of the University of London in 2022 and published by Mkuki na Nyota in Tanzania.

Authors like Elieshi Lema (born 1949) have published works both in Swahili and English. Lema began writing poetry and then children's books in Swahili, before writing her first novel Parched Earth in English in 2001. This novel has been translated into Swedish and French and received an honourable mention for the Noma Award for Publishing in Africa.

== See also ==
- African literature
- Swahili literature, including Kenya
- List of Tanzanian writers
