= African Books Collective =

African publishers' collective

- Founded: 1989; 37 years ago
- Founder: Walter Bgoya, Henry Chakava and other African publishers
- Headquarters location: Oxford, UK
- Publication types: African fiction and nonfiction, books for children and young readers
- Nonfiction topics: African cultures and societies, politics, economics, gender studies, development studies
- Fiction genres: creative writing, academic studies
- Official website: africanbookscollective.com

The African Books Collective (ABC) is a nonprofit distribution and marketing collective owned by African publishers. Founded in 1989 and based in Oxford, United Kingdom, it enables publishers from across the African continent to reach international markets with their scholarly, literary, and children's books. Different from books by foreign authors, indigenous publishing reflects the history and culture of a people through language, writing, and the arts.

In the 21st century, more than 150 African publishers participate in ABC as a self-sufficient social enterprise to solve the problem of invisibility and dependence on outside distributors. Among ABC's major goals are support for African writers and scholars who are publishing with indigenous African publishers and, in turn, to give African publishing a noticeable, independent presence in the global book world.

== Background ==
Before independence, most books in African countries were imported from abroad, which meant from publishers in colonial empires including France, Belgium, the United Kingdom, Germany and Portugal, and written in European languages. These books and Eurocentric education were used in missionary or government schools to spread western culture and led to a disregard of African languages and identities. Domestic African publishing companies mainly produced newspapers or commercial printing products. Looking back on publishing in Africa after independence, Philip G. Altbach and Damtew Teffera wrote in their 1998 book Publishing and Development. A Book of Readings:

Publishing, because it is absolutely essential to the cultural, scientific, and educational life of nations, has an importance beyond its limited economic role. While it may be appropriate to import textiles or even computers, the production of books that directly reflect the culture, history of a nation or people is something that cannot be left to others, [...] It is a vital part of culture and deserves special consideration.

— Philip G. Altbach and Damtew Teffera, Publishing and Development. A Book of Readings.

After independence, most African governments adopted a dual strategy for public education: While primary schools are mainly teaching vernacular langages such as Kiswahili in Tanzania, secondary schools and colleges often use English or French. The textbooks, however, have still been mainly produced by international companies, such as Oxford University Press or Macmillan and their local subsidiaries. To produce the large numbers of schoolbooks for African students, international aid was often requested by governments. International aid policies in Africa—especially during the 1980s and 1990s—focused on supplying books to schools without considering their origin, cultural relevance, or developmental impact. These policies, shaped by mechanisms such as international competitive bidding, overwhelmingly favoured foreign publishers. As a result, African publishing houses were sidelined, creating an environment where many indigenous publishers struggled to stay afloat or were forced to shut down altogether.

Other structural challenges for publishers in Africa are copyright infringements and inadequate enforcement of copyright law, as well as few and underfunded public libraries. As books are often too expensive relative to their income, few Africans are reading for pleasure as opposed to practical books, such as dictionaries or required reading for education. Further, bookshops and stationery shops are rare, especially in rural areas, where school libraries are often the only places offering children suitable material for educational reading.

Despite this, African publishers have been able to produce books locally, but international distribution has been challenging, as books rarely reached readers outside their country. As part of a country's sovereign cultural policy, however, its ability to protect, develop and share its identity, culture and knowledge through books and other media is fundamental.

== History of ABC ==
During the early 1980s, books published in Africa could not be distributed internationally in any standardised way. They either had to be bought locally by interested buyers or shipped from the individual publisher to their customers. In 1985 a meeting of 17 African publishers addressed their shared difficulties in marketing, distributing, and receiving foreign exchange from international sales. To overcome this, African publishers in 1989 created the African Books Collective (ABC) as a shared solution. Instead of each publisher working alone, they pooled efforts into one collective. They chose to base ABC in Oxford, UK, to make access to global markets, bookstores, and libraries easier than before. With initial support from Northern funding agencies and an initial payment of £1000 by the core group of founder publishers, ABC set out in 1990 to strengthen its members’ economic base and serve the needs of libraries and other buyers.

One of the founders was Kenyan publisher and Chairman of the Kenya Publishers Association Henry Chakava. After ABC started, he held a permanent position at the Council of Management of ABC. Another co‑founder and leading member of ABC has been Tanzanian publisher Walter Bgoya. As an example of ABC's role, Bgoya's publishing house Mkuki na Nyota has been able to produce as many as 30–60 titles per year, further strengthening its role in promoting Kiswahili literature on the international level. By 2007s, ABC represented books by more than 130 African publishers and had become self-financing.

== Operations ==
=== Ownership and governance ===
ABC is registered in the UK as a company limited by guarantee and governed by a five-member Council of Management elected by its publisher-owners. It also maintains three UK directors who are legally responsible for the entity. In the 2020s, the six members of ABC's Council of Management are Ibrahim Oanda (CODESRIA, Senegal), Kiarie Kamau, (East African Educational Publishers, Kenya), Tapiwa Muchechemera, (Mkuki na Nyota Publishers, Tanzania), Akoss Ofori-Mensah (Sub-Saharan Publishers, Ghana) and Francois van Schalkwyk (African Minds Publishers, South Africa).

=== Distribution and marketing ===
ABC operates a warehouse in the UK to ship print books worldwide. It distributes over 3,000 African-published titles via print-on-demand (POD) both in the UK and the US, and e-book formats to the global market. Through their participation in book fairs and conferences, periodic catalogues, newsletters, social media and their blog readafricanbooks.com, ABC further promotes African books directly to authors, publishers and readers.

A bespoke digital library launched in November 2022 contains over 2,000 digitized titles from approximately 75 independent African publishers, making it one of the largest available digital resources of African-published books. The platform includes multilingual content, mainly in English, but also including French, Portuguese, Yoruba and Kiswahili, and employs MARC standard records discoverable via OCLC and WorldCat. Further, it allows institutions to purchase the full library or curated collections. Through the Baobab eBook Service, ABC supplies libraries and consortia directly.

=== Publisher returns and sustainability ===
ABC seeks to maximize income remittances to African publishers. It raised the remittance share from 35% during the 2007 self-financing transition to approximately 50% in the 2020s. During the COVID-19 pandemic, sales of both digital and print titles grew, particularly from libraries seeking to diversify collections, helping ABC and publishing members withstand industry pressures.

=== Reach and growth ===
In the 2020s, ABC's collection spans books from more than 150 publishers from over 20 nations, with a strong presence in sub-Saharan Africa. South Africa and Nigeria contribute a particularly large share of the titles. They come from a diverse range of sources, including academic and university presses, research centers, commercial publishing houses, NGOs, and publishers specializing in literature for children and young readers.

According to a 2020 interview with CEO Justin Cox, ABC had become independent of donor funding in 2007 after 15 years. It has since become a self-supporting social enterprise. Since 2002, ABC had started to produce books by print on demand (POD) and later also e-books, developing the digital tools for production and marketing along the way. Through this, the numbers of publishers and books sold have increased and ABC has been able to focus on additional marketing tasks, such as sending complimentary copies to reviewers or authors. ABC’s biggest market is in the United States, with Michigan State University Press as ABC's distributing partner. Other important markets are in China, Hong Kong, the UK, Germany, Canada, Japan, India, the Netherlands, France, and to a lesser degree, South Africa – particularly in digital sales.

Even though ABC is self-supporting, they announced receiving project-related grants in 2024 from the Hawthornden Foundation to support African publishers in countries with less developed literary production such as Mozambique. Another fund was awarded ABC by the US organization Lyrasis to publish some African books openly accessible.

== Support for African creative writing ==
To support aspiring African literary writers, ABC and the Dag Hammarskjold Foundation organised the African-Writers Publishers Seminar in Tanzania in 1998. Based on this, writers James Gibbs and Jack Mapanje published The African Writers’ Handbook, providing practical information and resource materials about writing and finding a publisher, literary prizes, writers’ organisations, magazines, vanity and self-publishing, literary agents, censorship, book fairs, resources for writers on the Internet and more. Another manual for this kind of readership is the 2022 publication Become a Better Writer from South Africa. Further, ABC periodically publishes catalogue lists of new literary titles.

Notable African literary authors and their publishers, including African women writers, whose books are distributed by ABC, include among others:

Name	Country	Works	Notable as
Mariama Bâ	Senegal	Barua Ndefu Kama Hii, Kiswahili translation of So Long a Letter	Novelist
Ellen Banda-Aaku	Zambia	Wandi’s Little Voice, Patchwork	Prize-winning novelist and children’s author
Edwige-Renée Dro	Côte d’Ivoire	Contributions to Africa39, New Daughters of Africa	Literary activist, translator
Abdulrazak Gurnah	UK/Tanzania	Peponi (Original title:Paradise)	Writer, Nobel Prize Laureate
Aniceti Kitereza	Tanzania	Mr. Myombekere and His Wife Bugonoka	Novelist
Goretti Kyomuhendo	Uganda	The First Daughter, Promises	Writer, Femrite & African Writers Trust founder
Taban Lo Liyong	South Sudan/Uganda	Three Poems from The Cows from Shambat	Scholar-author
Azanwi Nchami	Cameroon	Foot Prints of Destiny	Historically-themed novelist
Ngũgĩ wa Thiong'o	Kenya	Mtawa Mweusi, Kiswahili translation of The Black Hermit, Shetani Msalabani (Devil on the Cross)	Writer and academic
Francis B. Nyamnjoh	Cameroon/South Africa	A Sweet-Footed African	Scholar-author
Okot p'Bitek	Uganda	The Defence of Lawino, Song of Ocol, White Teeth	Poet and novelist
Hilda Twongyeirwe	Uganda	Fina the Dancer and other works	Literary activist, editor, FEMRITE coordinator
Ayeta Anne Wangusa	Uganda	Memoirs of a Mother, Tears of Hope	FEMRITE founder, contributor to New Daughters of Africa

== Partnerships and cooperations ==
ABC has cooperated in partnerships with the African Publishers' Network (APNET), the Council for the Development of Social Science Research in Africa (CODESRIA), which was also a founding member, the Zimbabwe International Book Fair (ZIBF), African Minds and others. In collaboration with the Pluto Educational Trust, ABC supports the African Journals Initiative for the benefit of no-fee diamond open-access African journals in social science and humanities, strengthening their discoverability through platforms like ScienceOpen and JSTOR. Further ABC maintains relations with NGO's, including the Association for the Development of Education in Africa (ADEA), Book Aid International, and the International Network for Advancing Science and Policy (INASP).

In an initiative for ethical co-publishing between Northern and African publishers, ABC established co-publishing for scholarly publications from Northern countries to become accessible to African scholars and researchers. Such academic publishing houses in the US and Europe include Michigan State University Press, Ohio University Press, Indiana University Press, Brill, James Currey, Pluto Press, and Cambridge University Press. In cooperation with the International African Institute (IAI) and the African Studies Associations (UK and US), ABC has found ways to allow African scholars to make use of these academic publications from the North. The goal of such co-publishing or licencing is to reduce the price of books for libraries or for licencing fees in Africa.

Referring to other types of cooperation by African publishers, ABC remarked that successful African authors are often signed by international publishers. These global enterprises usually do not allow publishers in their African authors' country of origin to publish their books for the local market. Such co-publications avoiding the costs of importation and allowing for lower prices have rarely been granted. An exception to this rule are books by Chimamanda Ngozi Adichie, that have been republished in Nigeria. Another type of granting rights from international publishers to local editions are translations into African languages. By this, Mkuki na Nyota in Dar es Salaam was able to secure the rights for Kiswahili translations of novels by Zanzibari-born British Nobel Prize winner Abdulrazak Gurnah.

== Reception ==
ABC has been regarded as a successful and unique distribution model for African publishing. In reviews and commentary, its role has been noted for enabling global access to African perspectives and supporting sustainable development in the African publishing industry. One source noted ABC for the "shared ethos of publishing" as well as for its effective marketing and distribution of hundreds of African titles.

Researchers and librarians value ABC’s contribution to increasing the availability of African-published content in libraries of the global North. Thus, a 2024 article in Library Journal wrote "Libraries seeking to decolonize collections and foster bibliodiversity by supporting small and independent publishers in the Global South may find African Books Collective a worthwhile investment." In 2017, University World News featured the goals, history and present of ABC. This was followed in by a similar article in 2019 by the International Alliance of Independent Publishers, highlighting the trend to digital publishing.

A paper presented at a conference on "Decolonizing African Studies" at the University of Edinburgh in 2019 described how ABC distributed academic work by many African university presses up to the 1990s. Since then, this kind of publishing has been taken over by private independent publishers and specialized research institutes such as the Council for the Development of Social Science Research in Africa, the Institute of Southern African Studies and others. As an example for this trend, the African Journals OnLine (AJOL) in South Africa assists African researchers, authors, editors and journals by making African academic resources freely available.

Assessing recent trends and future developments, a 2025 article in the African Business magazine reported ABC's currently available 4,000 print titles and 2,500 ebooks, and a continuing trend towards digital publishing. The spread of mobile phones and digital platforms enable publishers to engage with readers, particularly the large and growing number of young people in Africa, in new and creative ways. Nevertheless, the potential of digital literature remains limited by disparities, such as sporadic internet connectivity, the cost of mobile data, and inadequate digital frameworks. This means that online availability does not necessarily imply accessibility for everyone.

== See also ==
- African literature
- List of African writers by country
- Languages of Africa
- Economy of Africa
