= Walter Bgoya =

Tanzanian publisher and author (born 1942)

- Born: 1942 (age 83–84); Ngara, Kagera Region, Tanganyika Territory
- Occupations: Publisher, author, translator
- Years active: 1972–present
- Known for: book publishing in Tanzania
- Awards: Brittle Paper 2024 Publisher of the Year, Best Children's Publisher from Africa at Bologna Children's Book Fair

Walter Bgoya (born 1942) is a Tanzanian publisher, author, and Pan‑Africanist intellectual known for his leadership of public and independent publishing initiatives in Tanzania. He served as General Manager of Tanzania Publishing House (TPH) from 1972 until 1990 and then founded and managed his own company Mkuki na Nyota Publishers Ltd, established in 1981 in Dar es Salaam.

Distinguished as Chairman of the Noma Award for Publishing in Africa and Publisher of the Year in 2024, Bgoya and his promotion of literary and non-fiction books in both English and Kiswahili have been repeatedly acknowledged by the African and international publishing industry.

== Life and career ==
=== Early life and education ===
Bgoya was born in the north-western town Ngara in colonial-era Tanganyika Territory and received his schooling in a Christian mission boarding school. His parents came from a peasant background but owned significant land, with his mother overseeing the fields and frequently hiring people from the community who were less well off. In a region where few people had access to education, his father was among the few who had received formal schooling. He earned a living as a teacher and was known for his leadership.

Bgoya's early fascination with reading began in the 1950s and his worldview was shaped during the 1960s—amid the wave of decolonization, Pan‑Africanism, and Ujamaa socialism promoted by President Julius Nyerere. From 1961 to 1965, Bgoya studied with a scholarship at the University of Kansas. During his time the United States, he encountered racial segregation and participated in the civil rights movement—experiences that influenced his intellectual and political convictions.

Back in Tanzania, Bgoya spent seven years at the Ministry of Foreign Affairs, helping African liberation movements through the Liberation Committee of the Organization of African Unity. During this time, he collaborated with liberation movements in southern Africa and provided support to anti-imperialist causes worldwide.

=== Publishing in Tanzania ===
After independence, African governments prioritized economic growth over cultural development and promoted national parastatal publishers such as Tanzania Publishing House (TPH). Publishing books is both a commercial undertaking as well as a contribution to education in Tanzania and to its cultural development. However, governments provided little support for cultural industries, treating culture mainly as folklore to entertain political leaders or visiting dignitaries. Copyright infringements and weak enforcement of copyright law as well as inadequate public libraries pose further challenges for publishers. As books are often too expensive relative to their income, few Tanzanians are reading for pleasure as opposed to buying practical books such as dictionaries or required reading for education.

Another challenge is the use of English as the language of instruction in secondary schools and universities. Kiswahili, which is spoken by the majority of Tanzanians, is only used as a language of instruction in primary education. The transition from Kiswahili to English in secondary schools largely results in students not being able to understand books written in anything other than basic English, and the same has been said about universities.

As of 2021, Tanzania counted more than 11.1 million students enrolled in primary schools and, in 2018, more than 2,140,000 in secondary schools. In the face of these numbers, schoolbooks in both Kiswahili and English are the most reliable and stable market for publishers.

=== Tanzania Publishing House (TPH) (1972–1990) ===
A few years after independence in 1961, Tanzania set up a local publishing sector to supply school and cultural books in Kiswahili and English, leading to the creation of the parastatal Tanzania Publishing House (TPH) and the East Africa Publishing House (EAPH). Their locally produced publications were aligned with Tanzania's socialist ideology known as ujamaa and the national educational curriculum. The new publishing houses absorbed several smaller printers and regional publishers, creating a nationwide network for editing, printing, and distribution.

During the 1960s and 1970s, Dar es Salaam had become a lively hub of ideas and debate. The University of Dar es Salaam played a central role, fostering innovative scholarship that questioned established thinking, particularly in development studies and economics. Its Department of History gained international recognition as the "Dar es Salaam School of History". The state-owned publisher, TPH, supported this intellectual trend by releasing influential works that reflected and advanced the movement. Together, they established Tanzania as a leading centre of progressive African thought.

In 1973, Bgoya was appointed as general manager of Tanzania Publishing House. With no political restrictions by state supervision, he prioritized works by African scholars and authors, ensuring that the majority of TPH’s catalogue reflected Tanzanian history, culture, and socialist ideals. He called this "publishing for the people—publishing books that are of immediate benefit to them as well as works of literature with roots in our culture". An example for this was a series of books for vocational education titled Vitabu Vya Ufundi ("Books of Specialization"). These books contributed to create a national technical language by introducing new terms in both English and Kiswahili.

In line with Tanzania's ideology, TPH also released influential anti‑imperialist works such as Walter Rodney's How Europe Underdeveloped Africa, Agostinho Neto's Sacred Hope, Samora Machel's Establishing People's Power to Serve the Masses, and Issa Shivji's Class Struggles in Tanzania. Under Bgoya's leadership, TPH further published dozens of primary and secondary school textbooks, as well as monographs on local languages and development studies.

Another book that Bgoya wanted to publish was a manuscript of a novel by Tanzanian writer Aniceti Kitereza. It had originally been completed in 1945 in Kitereza's mother tongue Kerewe, but because no publishing house wanted to finance a novel in that endangered language, Kitereza translated it into Kiswahili himself. Almost 30 years went by until, in April 1974, Bgoya received a copy. After reviewing the manuscript, he agreed that TWP would publish it. First, Kitereza's manuscript was carefully edited to remove outdated and regional expressions and to cut repetitive sections. The book was then printed in two volumes in China, with the costs covered by the Ford Foundation. Unfortunately, advance copies of the novel, later translated into English in two volumes as Mr. Myombekere and His Wife Bugonoka, Their Son Ntulanalwo and Daughter Bulihwali, only arrived in Dar es Salaam in 1981. Shortly before this, however, Kitereza had died. More than another twenty years later, in 2002, Bgoya was also able to publish an English translation through his own company Mkuki na Nyota.

By the early 1980s, Tanzania entered a period of economic crisis. Structural adjustment programs, rising costs, limited resources, and weakened institutional support led to the decline of parastatal publishing. In this context, Bgoya left TPH in 1990, seeking to continue his mission independently.

=== Mkuki na Nyota Publishers (1991–2024) ===
In 1991, Bgoya founded his own Mkuki na Nyota Publishers Ltd (MNP) in Dar es Salaam. He created this publishing house to fill a void in independent scholarly and literary publishing, producing books in both English and Kiswahili, including children's literature, schoolbooks, fiction, political and development studies. With support from western donors during the early years of the company, MNP's children's book initiative produced around eighty titles in five years, including several written by Bgoya.

In 2000, after the United Nations adopted the Millennium Declaration, publishing, higher education, and teacher training were excluded from donors' primary development goals. This poverty reduction strategy led to a decline in funding, networking and marketing for African books, including for events such as the Zimbabwe International Book Fair and the Zimbabwe Publishing House that Bgoya advised in their early days.

Despite facing tight finances, volatile printing costs, and limited distribution, Bgoya persisted. To reduce the company's dependence on donors, he adopted print‑on‑demand technology by the mid‑1990s and outsourced production to reduce costs and expand output. His focus on socially relevant and innovative titles also helped his company weather a 2014 government reversion to state monopoly for the important textbook market.

Bgoya also co‑founded and acted as Chair of the Council of Management of the African Books Collective (ABC), enhancing global distribution of African-published works. This cooperative owned by more than 150 African publishers was mainly funded by Swedish and Norwegian development agencies until it became self-financing in 2007. Foreign donors contributed by providing funds, organizing regional training courses, and sponsoring international book fairs. With this support, independent African publishers could build networks and expand their markets. Using distribution channels of the ABC, Mkuki na Nyota has published as many as 30–60 titles per year, further strengthening the publisher's role in promoting Kiswahili literature on the continental stage.

In 2022, Mkuki na Nyota published the first translation into an African language of a work by Zanzibari-born British writer Abdulrazak Gurnah. Paradise, one of Gurnah's earlier novels, set in historical East Africa, was translated into Kiswahili after Gurnah had been awarded the 2021 Nobel Prize in Literature. This award spurred interest in his work among readers in Tanzania, and the publisher has announced the translation of more of his works. Further, several of the company's books have been distinguished with the Safal Kiswahili Prize for African Writing.

=== Intellectual stance ===
Bgoya has referred to his career as a contribution to a "second liberation" of Africa—one rooted in knowledge production and intellectual sovereignty. Books should shape public opinion, spark national discussions, inspire a love for reading and writing, and meet the demands of an empowering education and culture.

Commenting on the importance of Kiswahili as an African language for education and general culture, Bgoya has said:

Kiswahili is more than a language—it's a unifying force in East Africa and a symbol of our shared identity. By publishing in Kiswahili, we're ensuring that our people have access to literature that reflects their realities, values, and aspirations. It's also a way of resisting linguistic imperialism, which often erases local languages and, with them, the unique knowledge and stories they carry.

=== Personal life ===
Bgoya has lived in Dar es Salaam for much of his career. In latter years, as he has transitioned into retirement, he entrusted Mkuki na Nyota's management to his son, Mkuki Bgoya.

=== Selected professional positions ===
- General Manager, Tanzania Publishing House, 1972–1980
- Founder and Managing Director, Mkuki na Nyota Publishers Ltd, 1981–2024
- Founding member and longtime Chair of the Council of Management of the African Books Collective
- Chairman, Noma Award for Publishing in Africa

=== Selected publications as author or editor ===
- Bgoya, Walter (2001). "The effect of globalisation in Africa and the choice of language in publishing". International review of education 47(3/4). 283–292.
- Mwana Mdogo wa Mfalme (2011), Kiswahili translation of Le petit prince by Antoine de Saint-Exupéry, translated by Philipp Kruse and Walter Bgoya. Dar-es-Salaam: Mkuki na Nyoka, ISBN 978-9987-08-035-9.
- Kiyaya, John, Walter Bgoya et al. (2013) John Kiyaya. Mpiga Picha Mtanzania na watu wa Ziwa Tanganyika / Un photographe tanzanien avec les gens du Lac Tanganyika / Tanzania photographer and People of Lake Tanganyika. Dar es Salaam: Mkuki na Nyota, ISBN 978-9987-08-254-4 (in Kiswahili, French and English).
- Bgoya, Walter (2013). "Publishing in Africa from Independence to the Present Day", Research in African Literatures, Vol. 44, No. 2, pp. 17–34.
- Bgoya, Walter (2014). "50 Years of Independence: Reflections on the Role of Publishing and Progressive African Intellectuals". Africa Spectrum. 49 (3): 107–119. doi:10.1177/000203971404900305. ISSN 0002-0397.
- SADC Hashim Mbita Project (2019). Southern African Liberation Struggles, 1960 – 1994. 9 volumes. ISBN 978-9987-75-328-4.

== Awards and recognition ==
- Brittle Paper's 2024 Publisher of the Year
- Safal Kiswahili Prize for African Writing
- Best Children's Publisher from Africa at the Bologna Children's Book Fair
- ASAUK – Outstanding African Studies Award 2024, together with Mary Jay of African Books Collective

== Reception ==
During Bgoya's career spanning more than 50 years, professional and scholarly media have published his articles about the role of intellectuals and the publishing industry in Africa. Analyses of Bgoya's views and achievements, including studies on African literature and culture, have described his persistence and his commitment to Pan‑African publishing despite financial adversity. His awards and recognitions include prizes for African literary titles he published as well as for his personal achievements as a publisher in Africa and beyond. In UNESCO's 2025 study The African Book Industry, Bgoya was quoted as a "distinguished veteran in African publishing".

International conferences and seminars have invited Bgoya for lectures and discussions including a keynote speech in 2014 at the African Studies Association of the UK's biennial conference titled "50 Years of Independence: Reflections on the Role of Progressive African Intellectuals". In 2017, he delivered the keynote address "Publishers, Authors and Africa's Cultural Development: Do the African intelligentsia and the African States care?" at the 3rd East African Literature and Cultural Studies Conference in Dar es Salaam. At a 2021 online seminar organized by the University of Cape Town, he spoke about the limitations of publishing in Africa.

In his 2014 book And Home was Kariakoo: A Memoir of East Africa, Tanzanian-born Canadian writer M. G. Vassanji recounts his long-standing friendship with Bgoya and the publisher's activities from the 1960s onwards. The 2022 biography A Revolutionary for our Time. The Walter Rodney Story describes Bgoya's close relationship with Rodney in Dar es Salaam of the 1960s and 1970s as friend and publisher of How Europe Underdeveloped Africa.

In a 2024 interview with literary magazine Brittle Paper, Bgoya was quoted saying:

I wanted to publish books that exposed the existence of exploitative colonial and neo-colonial structures that made our countries' independence illusory. African intellectuals have a responsibility to raise awareness of the poverty of politics in our countries that align with foreign interests to the disadvantage of our people. I dedicated my energies to this task, not only in, and for my own country but also for the wider Pan-African world.

== See also ==
- Kiswahili literature
- Tanzanian literature
- Elieshi Lema
- Demere Kitunga
- Henry Chakava
