= Tanzania Publishing House =

Tanzanian state-owned publishing company

- Founded: 1960s
- Founder: Government of Tanzania
- Country of origin: United Republic of Tanzania
- Headquarters location: 24 Samora Avenue, Dar es Salaam, Tanzania
- Key people: Walter Bgoya (Managing director until 1970)
- Publication types: schoolbooks for primary and secondary public education, vocational training, fiction and nonfiction books, children's books
- Nonfiction topics: subjects taught in public schools, politics, economics, development studies

Tanzania Publishing House (TPH) is a state-owned publishing company established in Dar es Salaam, Tanzania, in the 1960s. TPH has produced educational and cultural publications that support Tanzania's post-colonial development and national ideology. Since its beginnings, TPH has become known for publishing schoolbooks, scholarly works, fiction as well as Pan-Africanist and other non-fiction works.

== Publishing in Tanzania ==
After independence, African governments prioritized economic growth over cultural development and promoted national parastatal publishers such as TPH. Publishing books is both a commercial undertaking, an important tool for education and a contribution to a society's cultural development. However, governments provided little support for cultural industries, treating culture mainly as folklore to entertain political leaders or visiting dignitaries. Weak copyright infringements and inadequate enforcement of copyright law as well as few and underfunded public libraries pose further challenges for publishers. As books are often too expensive relative to their income, few Tanzanians are reading for pleasure as opposed to practical books such as dictionaries or required reading for education. Further, bookshops and stationary shops are rare, especially in rural areas, where school libraries are often the only places offering children suitable material for educational reading.

Another challenge is the use of English as language of instruction in secondary schools and universities. Kiswahili, which is spoken by the majority of Tanzanians, is only used as language of instruction in primary education. The transition from Kiswahili to English in secondary schools largely results in students not being able to understand books written in anything other than basic English, and the same is true at universities.

As of 2021, Tanzania counted over 11.1 million students enrolled in primary schools and, in 2018, more than 2,140,000 in secondary schools. In the face of these numbers, schoolbooks in both Kiswahili and English are the most reliable and stable market for publishers.

== Tanzania Publishing House ==
=== Establishment and early years (1960s–1980) ===
A few years after independence in 1961, Tanzania set up a local publishing sector to supply school and cultural books in Kiswahili and English, leading to the creation of the parastatal Tanzania Publishing House (TPH) and the East Africa Publishing House (EAPH). Their locally produced publications were aligned with Tanzania's socialist ideology known as ujamaa and the national educational curriculum. The new publishing houses absorbed several smaller printers and regional publishers, creating a nationwide network for editing, printing, and distribution.

During the 1960s and 1970s, Dar es Salaam had become a lively hub of ideas and debate. The University of Dar es Salaam played a central role, fostering innovative scholarship that questioned established thinking, particularly in development studies and economics. Its Department of History gained international recognition as the “Dar es Salaam School of History.” The state-owned publisher, TPH, supported this intellectual trend by releasing influential works that reflected and advanced the movement. Together, they established Tanzania as a leading centre of progressive African thought.

In 1973, Walter Bgoya, an intellectual with Pan-Africanist sympathies, was appointed as TPH's first general manager. With no political restrictions by state supervision, he prioritized works by African scholars and authors, ensuring that the majority of TPH's catalogue reflected Tanzanian history, culture, and socialist ideals. He called this "publishing for the people—publishing books that are of immediate benefit to them as well as works of literature with roots in our culture." An example for this was a series of books for vocational education titled Vitabu Vya Ufundi (“Books of Specialization”). These books contributed to create a national technical language by introducing new terms in both English and Kiswahili.

In line with Tanzania's ideology, TPH also released influential anti‑imperialist works such as Walter Rodney’s How Europe Underdeveloped Africa, Agostinho Neto's Sacred Hope, Samora Machel's Establishing People's Power to Serve the Masses, and Issa Shivji’s Class Struggles in Tanzania. Under Bgoya's leadership, TPH further published dozens of primary and secondary school textbooks, as well as monographs on local languages and development studies.

Another book that Bgoya wanted to publish was a manuscript for a novel by Tanzanian writer Aniceti Kitereza. Originally completed already in 1945 in Kitereza's mother tongue Kerewe, no publishing house wanted to publish a novel in the endangered language Kerewe. So Kitereza translated it into Swahili himself. Another 30 years went by until, in April 1974, Bgoya received a copy. After reviewing the manuscript, he agreed to publish it in Kiswahili. First, Kitereza's manuscript was carefully edited to remove outdated and regional expressions and to cut repetitive sections. The book was then printed in two volumes in China, with the costs covered by the Ford Foundation. Unfortunately, the two volumes of the novel, titled Mr. Myombekere and His Wife Bugonoka, Their Son Ntulanalwo and Daughter Bulihwali in English only arrived in Dar es Salaam in 1981 shortly after Kitereza had died. In 2000, Bgoya could also publish an English translation through his own company Mkuki na Nyota.

=== Challenges during austerity (1980–1990) ===
The 1980s brought economic hardship to Tanzania under structural adjustment programs imposed by international lenders. State subsidies to TPH were cut, foreign exchange shortages drove up costs for paper and ink, and printing equipment aged without replacement. Despite these constraints, TPH continued to publish key textbooks—often at reduced print runs—and sought partnerships with regional printers in Kenya and Uganda to meet demand. Policies for international aid rather encouraged the production of foreign books than offers by national publishers, thereby supporting foreign companies. Concentrating on English-language publications, foreign—especially British—publishers kept selling books to universities and colleges. Some of them withdrew during the 1980s downturn but quickly returned once the World Bank had funded $60 million for educational materials. TPH turned from a publisher with a distinguished list to almost being unable to publish at all, as the government was not able to pay invoices.

=== Transition and 21st century ===
In the 1990s, development aid to Africa started to incorporate local publishing. Funded mainly by Nordic countries, it was seen as the key to sustainable African book provision and development. Tanzania's education sector was liberalized, allowing private publishers to enter the market. In 1991, Walter Bgoya left TPH to found Mkuki na Nyota Publishers, starting an independent press that built on TPH's Pan-Africanist foundations.

In 2004, the Swedish International Development Cooperation Agency (SIDA) published an evaluation report of the Pilot Project for Publishing (1993–2000) in Tanzania. During many years, SIDA had been the main donor for textbook production and distribution in Tanzania. Referring to TPH, the report mentioned the publisher's difficult financial situation that prompted the plan of a company buyout by employees. Additionally, the company produced mostly textbooks for schools, with dwindling numbers of scholarly and creative works. Further, the report highlighted a gender imbalance as only nine writers of TPH textbooks were female, while 230 were male. Facing competition by foreign and local independent publishers, TPH remained a major source of official textbooks, though over time its market share declined as international and private companies expanded.

In the 2010s two British publishing houses were subject of a World Bank investigation. Similar to Macmillan Ltd., who were fined for illegal payments to officials in South Sudan, Oxford University Press (OUP) East Africa and OUP Tanzania were found guilty of having bribed officials. Both were fined millions of British pounds by the UK Serious Fraud Office and barred from World Bank-funded orders for three years. In 2014, Tanzania's Chama Cha Mapinduzi (CCM) government abandoned the market-based system for providing textbooks that had been established in the early 1990s, reverting to full state control instead. A 2015 scholarly article claimed that donor policies were giving an advantage to Western publishers. It also argued that the distribution of power and corrupt practices of state officials and publishers to capture public funding for textbooks had effectively counteracted the country's educational policy.

=== Organization and activities ===
- Ownership: Fully owned by the Tanzanian Ministry of Education.
- Headquarters: Dar es Salaam, with regional branches in Dodoma, Mwanza, and Mbeya
- TPH Bookshop at 47 Samora Avenue, Dar es Salaam
- Publications:
  - Primary and secondary school textbooks in English and Kiswahili
  - Scholarly monographs on African history, development policy, and linguistics
  - Literary works written in Kiswahili and translated from other languages
  - Children's storybooks promoting reading

== Selected publications ==
Title	Author	Year	Genre
Ujamaa: African Socialism	Walter Bgoya	1974	Political ideology
Historia ya Tanzania	A. M. Karume	1978	History (secondary level)
Kiswahili Kwa Wahudumu	M. S. Mbise	1982	Language education

== See also ==
- Education in Tanzania
- Tanzanian literature
