= Mkuki na Nyota =

Tanzanian publisher

- Founded: 1981; 45 years ago
- Founder: Walter Bgoya
- Successor: Mkuki Bgoya
- Country of origin: United Republic of Tanzania
- Headquarters location: 24 Samora Avenue, Dar es Salaam, Tanzania
- Distribution: African Books Collective
- Publication types: fiction and nonfiction books, children's books
- Nonfiction topics: Politics, economics, gender studies, development studies, children
- Official website: www.mkukinanyota.com

Mkuki na Nyota Publishers Ltd (MNP) is a Tanzanian book publishing company for independent literary, non-fiction and scholarly publishing. Founded in 1991 by editor and publishing executive Walter Bgoya, Mkuki na Nyota has published an extensive list of books in English as well as in Kiswahili. It is a member of the African Books Collective, representing a group of more than 150 African publishers.

== History ==
Bgoya founded Mkuki na Nyota in 1981 after his eight-year tenure as general manager of the state-owned Tanzania Publishing House (TPH). The new imprint was conceived as an independent platform for scholarly and literary publishing in Tanzania.

From the outset the press published in both English and Kiswahili and positioned itself within regional and global scholarly networks; it is a long-standing member of African Books Collective (ABC), the Oxford-based distribution co-operative owned by African publishers. In the 2020s, the company transitioned from Walter Bgoya, who retired from day-to-day leadership, to his son, editor Mkuki Bgoya.

== Publishing profile ==
Mkuki na Nyota’s extensive list of publications ranges across Tanzanian and African history, politics, and culture, alongside fiction and children’s literature. Notable strands include:

- Scholarly and historical works such as A New History of Tanzania and Aspects of Colonial Tanzania History
- Edited or reissued texts central to East African intellectual life, including an anniversary reissue of Issa Shivji's Class Struggles in Tanzania and a study about the 1960s radical student journal Cheche
- Literary titles in Kiswahili, including books awarded the Safal Kiswahili Prize for African Literature
- Political memoir and contemporary non-fiction, including the three-volume biography of Julius Nyerere Development as Rebellion and former president Benjamin Mkapa’s autobiography My Life, My Purpose: A Tanzanian President Remembers (2019)

Among its literary publications is the first direct-from-Kerewe English translation by Gabriel Ruhumbika of Aniceti Kitereza’s epic novel Mr. Myombekere and His Wife Bugonoka, Their Son Ntulanalwo and Daughter Bulihwali. This was followed in 2022 by a monograph by Shoonie (a.k.a. Charlotte) Hartwig on Kitereza's life and work. Mkuki na Nyota has also published books in Kiswahili written in other languages, including Antoine de Saint-Exupéry's Le Petit Prince translated from its original French.

In 2022, Mkuki na Nyota published the first translation into an African language of a work by Zanzibari-born British writer Abdulrazak Gurnah. Paradise, one of his earlier novels taking place in historical East Africa, was translated into Kiswahili after Gurnah had been awarded the 2021 Nobel Prize in Literature. This award spurred interest in his work among readers in Tanzania, and the publisher has announced the translation of more of his works.

== Partnerships ==
Mkuki na Nyota has published books in conjunction with the African Books Collective, the Economic and Social Research Foundation (ESRF), Research on Poverty Alleviation (REPOA), Research on Democracy in Tanzania (REDET) and others. Additionally, the company has partnered with non-governmental organisations to promote reading and education in Tanzania, for example, with Newton Tanzania.

== Reception ==
Mkuki na Nyota has been recognized by organizations and writers for sustaining independent scholarly and language-based publishing in East Africa.

In December 2024, literary magazine Brittle Paper named Mkuki na Nyota its Publisher of the Year, citing the company’s “commitment to making space for African-language literature to thrive.” At the 2024 conference of the African Studies Association of the UK (ASAUK), founder Walter Bgoya, together with Mary Jay, a former CEO of ABC, received the Outstanding African Studies Award, in recognition of their contributions to African publishing and book circulation.

Further, UNESCO’s 2021 sector review on the African book industry called Bgoya a “distinguished veteran in African publishing” and discussed the policy environment in which Mkuki na Nyota operates. Additionally, interviews and features in magazines African Arguments and Africa in Words have described the company’s role in documenting Tanzanian and pan-African intellectual history and in promoting Kiswahili literature.

== See also ==
- Kiswahili literature
- Tanzanian literature
- Elieshi Lema
- Demere Kitunga
- Henry Chakava
