= Ukerewe =

Ukerewe may refer to:

- Ukerewe Constituency, a parliamentary constituency in Ukerewe District, Tanzania
- Ukerewe District, a district in Mwanza Region, Tanzania
- Ukerewe Island, an island in Lake Victoria, Tanzania
- Lake Ukerewe, a name for Lake Victoria predating British arrival in the region
