= Kerewe =

Kerewe may refer to:

- Kerewe people
- Kerewe language
