= Azanwi Nchami =

Cameroonian scholar and writer

- Born: Cameroon
- Education: University of Ottawa, Canada
- Title: Writer

Azanwi Nchami is a Cameroonian scholar and writer from Bambui, Tubah subdivision in the North-West Region of Cameroon.

== Biography ==
Azanwi Nchami is a Cameroonian writer from Bambui, Tubah Sub-Division in the North-West Region of Cameroon. She attended Our Lady of Lourdes Secondary School, Mankon, Bamenda, and CCAST Bambili before continuing her studies at the University of Ottawa, Canada.

== Publications ==
Nchami is known for her historical novel Foot Prints of Destiny, which explores Kamerun’s resistance to German colonialism. The novel follows a group of young individuals navigating the complexities of colonial rule, love, and identity in pre-war Africa. It highlights the struggles of historical figures like Martin Paul Samba and Rudolph Douala Manga Bell, who were key leaders in the fight against German imperialism. By weaving historical facts with fiction, she brings attention to Cameroon's overlooked nationalist movements and the personal struggles of those who fought against German colonialism.

Foot Prints of Destiny portrays the political and social tensions of the time, including the exploitation of local populations and the resistance movements that sought to reclaim autonomy. It also explores the impact of colonial education, as some Cameroonian elites studied in Germany but faced discrimination and exclusion.

The novel was first Published on the 8th of October, 2005, with a second publishing taking place on October 1, 2009 by Langaa RPCIG, Cameroon.

== Writing style ==
Compared to other historical novels, such as Chinua Achebe’s Things Fall Apart or Ngũgĩ wa Thiong’o’s A Grain of Wheat, Foot Prints of Destiny offers a unique perspective on colonial resistance by emphasizing the role of education and cultural identity in shaping nationalist movements. While Achebe's novel explores the Igbo experience under British rule and Ngũgĩ's work delves into Kenya's fight for independence, Nchami's book provides insight into the early resistance movements in Cameroon before World War I.

== See also ==
- Chinua Achebe
- Kenjo Jumbam
- Asseng Protais
- Rudolph Douala Manga Bell
