= Euphrase Kezilahabi =

Tanzanian poet (1944–2020)

- Born: April 13, 1944; Ukerewe Island
- Died: January 9, 2020 (aged 75); Dar es Salaam

Euphrase Kezilahabi (13 April 1944 – 9 January 2020) was a Tanzanian novelist, poet, and scholar.

== Biography ==
Born in Ukerewe, Tanganyika (now in Ukerewe District of Mwanza Region in Tanzania), he last worked at the University of Botswana, as an associate professor at the Department of African Languages (now African Cultural Department).

He wrote in Swahili, and delivered talks on subjects such as 'Aesthetic Ambivalence in Modern Swahili' and 'The Concept of the Hero in African Fiction'.

== Works ==
- Rosa Mistika (English translation) - 2025 (Translated by Jay Boss Rubin, foreword by Annmarie Drury)
- Stray Truths: Selected Poems of Euphrase Kezilahabi (Edited and translated by Annmarie Drury) - 2015
- Miscellaneous poems published by the Poetry Translation Centre (Translated by Katriina Ranne)
- Dhifa (poetry collection) - 2008
- Mzingile (novel) - 1991
- Nagona (novel) - 1990
- Karibu Ndani (poetry collection) - 1988
- African Philosophy and the Problem of Literary Interpretation (PhD dissertation) - 1985
- The Concept of the Hero in African Fiction (MA thesis) - 1982
- Gamba la Nyoka (novel) - 1979
- Kaptula la Marx (play) - 1978
- Dunia Uwanja wa Fujo (novel) - 1975
- Kichwamaji (novel) - 1974
- Kichomi (poetry collection) - 1974
- Rosa Mistika (novel) - 1971

== Influenced ==
- Fadhy Mtanga
- Vincent R. Ogoti
