= Anyadike =

- Gender: Male
- Language: Igbo

Origin
- Origin: Nigeria
- Meaning: Eye of the warrior
- Region of origin: South east

Anyadike // is an Igbo surname meaning "eyes of the warrior". Notable people with the surname include:

- Erica Sugo Anyadike, Tanzanian writer
- Kimberly Anyadike (born 1994), American pilot
- Unoaku Anyadike (born 1994), Nigerian model and beauty pageant titleholder
