= Maangamizi: The Ancient One =

2001 film by Martin Mhando

- Directed by: Martin Mhando; Ron Mulvihill
- Written by: Queenae Taylor Mulvihill
- Produced by: Executive producer Jonathan Demme; Martin Mhando; Queenae Taylor Mulvihill; Ron Mulvihill
- Starring: Barbara O. Jones; Amandina Lihamba; Samahani Kejeri; Waigwa Wachira
- Cinematography: Willie E. Dawkins
- Edited by: Jimmy Ling
- Music by: Cyril Neville
- Distributed by: Gris-Gris Films Inc.
- Release date: February 18, 2001
- Running time: 110 minutes
- Countries: Tanzania; United States
- Languages: Swahili; English

Maangamizi: The Ancient One is a 2001 American / Tanzanian drama film directed by Martin Mhando and Ron Mulvihill and executive produced by Jonathan Demme. It premiered at the Pan African Film Festival and has played in over 55 Film Festivals worldwide. It was the Tanzanian submission for the Academy Award for Best foreign language film, the first film to be submitted from that country, but was not nominated.

== Plot ==
Dr. Asira is faced with the contrast between Western medicine and traditional East African spirituality when a woman, Samehe, who is admitted to a psychiatric hospital, claims to be under the care of Maangamizi, a mysterious ancestor / shaman.

== Cast ==
- Barbara O. Jones as Dr. Asira (as BarbaraO)
- Amandina Lihamba as Samehe
- Samahani Kejeri as Simba Mbili
- Waigwa Wachira as Dr. Odhiambo
- Ummie Mahfouda Alley as Patient
- Zainabu Bafadhili as Young Samehe
- Chemi Che-Mponda as Nurse Malika
- Mary Chibwana as Patient
- Janet Fabian as Sister Francis
- Stumai Halili as Patient
- Mwanajuma Ali Hassan as Bibi Maangamizi
- Kisaka A. Kisaka as Reverend Waigwa
- Mgeni as Young Asira
- Thecla Mjatta as Zeinabu
- Mona Mwakalinga as Mariamu
- Adam Mwambile as Dr. Moshi
- Evodia Ndonde as Patient

== Awards ==
Maangamizi: The Ancient One won the Golden Dhow at the 1998 Zanzibar International Film Festival. It won the Paul Robeson Award for Best Feature at the Newark Black Film Festival.

== See also ==
- List of Tanzanian submissions for the Academy Award for Best Foreign Language Film
