= Mashetani =

1971 play by Ebrahim Hussein

Mashetani (Devils) is a play written in 1971 in Swahili by Tanzanian playwright Ebrahim Hussein. It has four acts and takes place in Tanzania shortly after the country's independence. The plot centers around the relationship of the characters Juma and Kitaru. Mashetani has some absurdist elements, including a play within the play and a dream sequence. In the stage directions, Hussein also added descriptions that give the play a more abstract, surreal expression. In Swahili, shetani (singular) is the word for an East African spirit. These spirits are mostly malevolent and appear as distorted figures. The play was translated to English by Joshua Williams (Oxford University Press: 2021.

== Plot ==
=== Act 1 ===
Act one opens on Juma and Kitaru out for a walk. They stop in front of a baobab tree and begin a performance of 'The Devil and Man'. Juma plays the Devil and Kitaru, the man. The rest of the act is performed with the added layer of the Devil (Juma) and Kitaru (Man), until the very end when Juma breaks character to reconcile with Kitaru after the dark subject matter scares them. The Devil transforms into a bird, and flaunts other tricks, to convince Man of his supernatural superiority. The Devil then insists Man express the fear, and other emotions, Man feels in his heart—on his face. The Devil wants to see his effect on Man. The Devil explains that if you wear the emotions other people desire on your face, even if they contrast with those in your heart, they will eventually merge. The Devil then demands Man approach him. After several attempts, Man approaches and bows in reverence, and The Devil is immediately pleased and begins to laugh, becoming violent. He then transforms into a "gentle, meek, and humble man", keep in mind he is still spiritually masked as The Devil. He then starts to grin (in pain), then laughs inaudibly. The Devil then commands Man to repeatedly say the devilish word "gashalazeritwas" (unclear in meaning), however, it has a very powerful effect on Man. As The Devil repeats his command, it slowly tortures Man by drawing blood and breaking his organs. This results in The Man fainting from the pain while The Devil grins. The Devil speaks to Man on the bitterness of birth; he faints again. Lights out. The Man wakes up much later, huddled under the baobab tree. He can hear The Devil but cannot see him; The Devil taunts him with laughter. He reveals he has transformed himself into the wind. Man wants The Devil to fight him, he wants to kill The Devil. They argue for a while and The Devil agrees to reveal himself under the conditions that he gets to make three requests, the Man obliges. The Devil reappears and states his first request, "Have you ever heard of someone who slaughtered himself?” Two, that Man celebrates his death before he kills him, and three, that Man chooses how they celebrate. Man decides on a waltz. The pair happily waltz and drink wine. Suddenly, The Devil offers Man the knife in which he kills him. With every stab to the ribs, The Devil laughs harder until he is dead. The Man observes the corpse and reconciles with his actions. He then sings a song under the baobab tree. Man begins to monologue about the previous events and how they altered him. It is at the end of this monologue that Man is transformed back into Kitaru and exits the stage. Juma appears after, trying to reconcile with Kitaru. He calls for him, but Kitaru does not respond. Juma exits the stage. Blackout.

=== Act 2 ===
The entirety of Act Two is performed in the dark, with fog. There are small bursts of light, often red but not always. The act takes place inside of Kitaru's mind, therefore his head must be placed on stage somehow (picture, projection, etc.). There is laughter throughout the act that is supposed to drown out the actors, and they must compete with it—later resulting in a harsh silence.

==== Scene One ====
Inside Kitaru's house, Mama Kitaru iron's clothes. Juma arrives looking for Kitaru. Mama Kitaru explains that he is not in, however, the two of them converse about how hard both the men in their families work. Mama Kitaru explains how overworked she feels. Later, Juma and Kitaru converse in his room about classes and the pros and cons of attending university. After Juma offers to go to the cinema, Kitaru declines his offer because the only film Juma wants to see is one about cowboys and "Indians". Their conversation slowly becomes an argument about the oppressed/the oppressor, Kitaru remembers the play from a few days ago. Harsh laughter is inserted throughout their argument. Baba Kitaru arrives while they argue. He shows the family his new Mercedes Benz. Their frightening laughter grows. Juma exits. Kitaru and Baba Kitaru drive off.

==== Scene Two ====
Bab Kitaru reads the newspaper, Mama Kitaru sews, and Kitaru tries to read a book but is distracted. Mfaume arrives at the top of the act. The three converse for a moment, then Baba Kitaru notices Kitaru is lost in thought. Kitaru explains the play about Devils and his infatuation with it. Kitaru then explains the sense of separation he feels with Juma, resulting in him running off stage. Baba Kitaru and Mama Kitaru discuss the incident, Mama Kitaru expresses her concern about the devil. Bab Kitaru dismisses the incident as nothing more than a headache.

==== Scene Three ====
Later, Kitaru sits in the house, thinking; Mama Kitaru enters. Kitaru explains he is thinking of a story Juma's grandmother told them the other day, the story of a devilish fish. Kitaru explains devils to his mother, she grows fearful of her son. She dismisses Kitaru's stories as myths of their culture's past. Mfaume enters and Mama Kitaru exits. Kitaru asks Mfaume if he believes in devils. Mfaume explains their hidden nature and continues with his work. Kitaru is left on stage, fearful.

==== Scene Four ====
In this scene, Kataru is sick and he has been asleep for a long time. Mama and Baba Kitaru argue over which doctor will best treat him, a medical one or the witch doctor. The medical doctor arrives and dismisses Kitaru's state as neurosis and mental exhaustion, which is why he gave him sleeping pills. The doctor suggests Kitaru see a psychiatrist if his condition doesn't improve.

=== Act 3 ===
Act three takes place in Juma's home. Mama Juma has a problem with Juma's attitude, yet Grandmother believes Mama Juma's arguments to be flawed. She is bitter about the wealth taken away from their family and mentions everything Juma would've had. Juma leaves right before Baba Juma comes home. The second scene takes place in a bar and centers around Juma, two waiters and two customers. Waiter one asks if the customers would like a double or single whisky, and Customer one responds defensively, assuming the waiter has just underestimated his knowledge about whisky. Customer two tries to defuse the tension by explaining the situation to Customer one, but Customer one disregards him. He then explains to Customer two that this is the African man's time and that he refuses to die a poor man. The scene ends with Juma deciding whether or not he will discuss with Kitaru, and he chooses not to.

=== Act 4 ===
Act four begins with Juma visiting Kitaru's house. Juma discovers that Kitaru has been acting strange. Kitaru has been quieter than usual, sleeping for an abnormally large amount of time, and sweating profusely. He tells Juma, "...in the dream-world a person sees the truth more clearly than in real life." Kitaru reveals he has been having bad thoughts ever since rehearsing the play. He describes a dream in which he sprouted feathers that soon turned into wings. Kitaru saw the feathers as a positive until terror set in and the feathers wouldn't disappear, even when he tried picking them out. Kitaru also reveals that Juma has been present in his dreams, assuming the form of a doctor and dispersed laughter. Kitaru asks Juma if they can rehearse the play again, and after some hesitation, Juma agrees. Scene two takes place in the dark amidst the baobab tree. For this rehearsal, Kitaru demands to play the devil. Juma refuses, and the two get into a physical fight. Juma believes he and Kitaru can no longer see each other, arguing, "A person climbing a ladder and a person coming down a ladder can't shake hands." The play ends with Kitaru calling after Juma and then silence.

== Characters ==
Devil, Man, Kitaru, Mama Kitaru (Kitaru's mother) Baba Kitaru (Kitaru's father), Mfaume (their servant), Doctor, Juma, Mama Juma (Juma's mother), Baba Juma (Juma's father), Grandmother (Juma's grandmother), waiters (x2), customers (x2).

== Context ==
Mashetani is set in Dar es Salaam, Tanzania at the end of 1966, before the Arusha Declaration. The Arusha Declaration was declared in 1967 by the Tanganyika African National Union (TANU). It was called the Policy on Socialism and Self Reliance and is a Tanzanian statement of African Socialism which exhorted the ideology and practice among the country's citizens. The play takes place before the Declaration, during a time of conflict and opposing ideas, which is reflected in the title, themes and symbolism, plot, and characters of Mashetani. Throughout the play, Kitaru comes face to face with the capitalism that surrounds him, in juxtaposition to the socialist ideals with which he begins to align himself. The introduction of the play describes the impact the nearby country of Zanzibar had on the ideological conflict in Tanzania. According to the introduction, in 1964, the last Sultan of Zanzibar and the Zanzibari Government were overthrown, causing Abedi Karume and the Afro Shirazi Party to take control. Karume and the new socialist government in Zanzibar seized land from larger farm owners and gave it to the people. The families whose land was taken resettled on the East African coast in countries like Tanzania. Juma, Kitaru's friend in the play, is among the population to be displaced from Zanzibar. Karume had formed a union with Julius Nyerere, the Tanganyikan president, to ensure the country that would become Tanzania would not align with the Soviet Union and become communist.

Dar es Salaam at the time was encouraging black intellectuals, especially those educated in a Western/European style to hold positions in the Tanganyikan government. But these people created a plutocracy because of how they had been educated. Kitaru's family is counted among these people. Much of the conflict in and surrounding their friendship is reflective of the conflict that occurred in ideology when the Zanzibari people emigrated to East African countries. Kitaru and Juma are both struggling against old practices of capitalism and faced with impending socialist practices and views. Where Kitaru is driven by economics and politics, Juma is dealing with what he and his family lost. Similarly to how the Zanzibari and Tanganyikan peoples had to define their relationship as cohabitants, Kitaru and Juma, though friends, had to discover the meaning of their relationship throughout the play. Hussein describes the fight between Juma and Kitaru not as individual, but as a "class conflict." Juma's family has lost wealth, while Kitaru's family is finding it, all on the brink of a declaration that will try to level the socioeconomic playing field through enforced socialism.

== Symbols and Themes ==
=== Laughter ===
Sound is a recurring device that Hussein uses throughout the play. It's worthy noting when Hussein uses silence and when he uses laughter. The laughter is introduced in the stage directions on page 9, "The DEVIL laughs. The MAN follows along. The DEVIL stops laughing suddenly. The MAN stops laughing with him, just as suddenly. The DEVIL starts laughing again, and now his laughter is threatening. Then suddenly he is transformed: he is gentle, meek – a humble man."

=== Birds ===
There are a couple references to birds throughout the play. One significant reference occurs on page 7, when the devil says, "All right. I have changed myself into a bird. Just like that, I can be wind, and be everywhere." Another important reference takes place in act four, page 55. As Kitaru reveals his dream to Juma, he mentions the feathers he was unable to pluck from himself, "Me – I remembered – I started to feel scared. I started to pull out my feathers. But every time I pulled a feather out, others sprouted. They suffocated me. Others sprouted – bigger and stronger than the old ones. I started to get worried – really worried: was I a person or a bird?"

=== Cars ===
Cars are a symbol of status and represent newborn wealth in this play. When Baba Kitaru comes home with a new car on page 27, Mama Kitaru exclaims, "A new car! A Benz!" Baba Kitaru responds with, "Mine! Yes! My own property, the sweat off my brow." Customer one also references a car as a symbol of status in Act three, page 49, "I’m telling you, man, there’s nothing that makes me happier than seeing my pal doing well. If I see an African with a car, riding around, and a house – and I don’t mean a hut. No. When I say ‘house’, I mean a house. A civilized place – with a garden and carpets...that sort of thing. Hey, then my soul is completely happy."

=== The fish and the boat ===
Kitaru mentions a story that involves a fish and a boat on page 34, "The story of the fish. Far, far away – if you cross the seven seas – there’s a big fish. If this fish takes a breath, all the water’s gone – all the water goes in his mouth. From where he is, he can suck in any boat he wants and swallow it. The boat will just be pulled along by the current of the water – if it wants to or if it doesn’t. And this fish isn’t a fish but a devil." A boat was previously mentioned on page 26 as well, "Okay, what if the current is pulling to one side, and the captain wants the boat to go in another direction?"

== Literature ==
- Williams, Joshua (2018-11-16), "And With Them Came Devils: Ebrahim Hussein, Mashetani & the poetics of doubt", in Hutchison, Yvette; Okoye, Chukwuma; Hutchison, Yvette; Okoye, Chukwuma (eds.), African Theatre 17: Contemporary Dance, Boydell and Brewer, pp. 153–162, doi:10.1515/9781787443150-010, ISBN 978-1-78744-315-0
- Khamis, Said AM (2005). "Book Review: Alain, R., Ebrahim Hussein: Swahili Theatre and Individualism". Nordic Journal of African Studies. 14 (3): 10–10.
- Ricard, Alain (2000). Ebrahim Hussein: Swahili Theatre and Individualism. Dar es Salaam: Mkuki na Nyota. ISBN 9976-973-81-0.
- Fiebach, Joachim (1997). "Ebrahim Hussein's Dramaturgy: A Swahili Multiculturalist's Journey in Drama and Theater". Research in African Literatures. 28 (4): 19–37. ISSN 0034-5210. JSTOR 3820782.
