= Alikiona =

1969 play written by Ebrahim Hussein

Alikiona (Consequences) is a play written in 1969 by Tanzanian playwright Ebrahim Hussein. Alikiona, originally written in Kiswahili, was translated to English by Joshua Williams. The play tells the story of an affair between a woman, Sadia and her lover, Abdallah. It centers on the discovery of the affair by Sadia's husband, Omari. The play is in one act and is typically performed with five actors. Alikiona has many naturalist elements, as is characteristic of much of Hussain's earlier work. Further, the play also includes elements of kichekesho, a comic interlude often found in taarab performances.

== Characters ==
Saida, Abdallah (her lover), Omari (her husband), Mama Pili (her friend), Abudu (a friend of Saida's family).

== Plot summary ==
In the one-act play Alikiona, a woman named Saida is having an affair with a man named Abdallah. In an effort to spend a weekend with her lover, Saida lies to her husband, Omari, and tells him she is going to spend the weekend with her mother whom she has not seen in a few years. After she leaves, a messenger arrives home and tells Omari that Saida's mother has died. Omari learns that Saida is not in fact with her mother and thus discovers that she is cheating on him. Once Saida returns from her weekend, Omari informs her of her mother's death, noting that this knowledge and circumstance is punishment enough for her cheating. Omari then tells Saida to go to her mother so she can be present for the end of the funeral rituals.

== Reception ==
German literary scholar Joachim Fiebach noted that the naturalist elements found in this play are likely due to the colonial influence on Husseins education of theatre arts at the University of East Africa. This play, along with Wakati Ukuta (Time is a Wall) were written while Hussein was studying Theatre Arts and French at the University of East Africa. Both plays follow many elements of the European structure of the "well made play."
