= Nansio =

Town and capital of Ukerewe District in Mwanza Region, Tanzania

Nansio Kata ya Nansio
- Ward
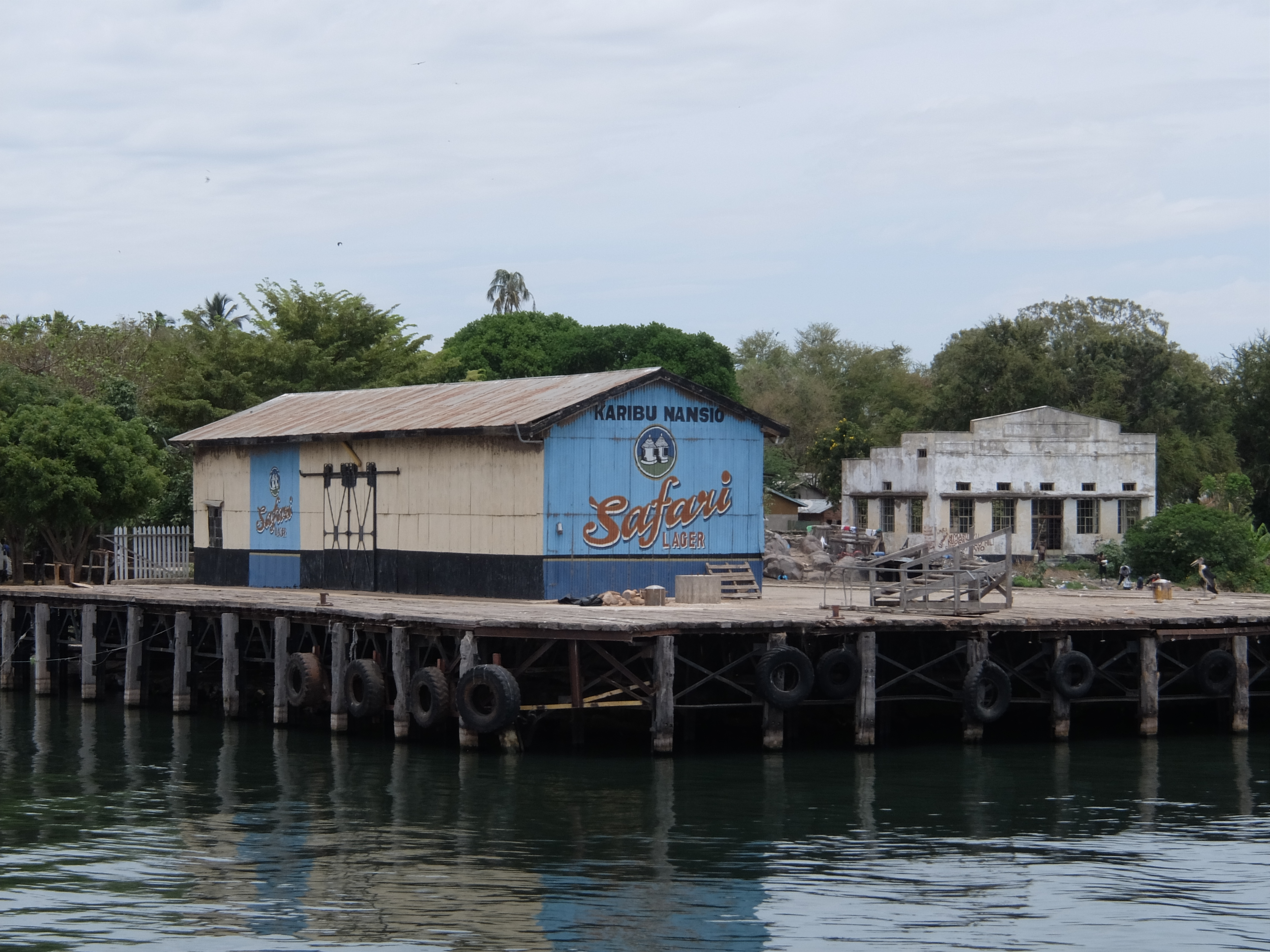
- The port of Nansio as seen from the ferry from Mwanza to Ukerewe Island
- Nickname: Lake island town
- Location within Tanzania Location within Africa
- Coordinates: 02°06′28″S 33°05′11″E
- Country: Tanzania
- Region: Mwanza Region
- District: Ukerewe District
- Ward: Nansio

Population (2016)
  - Total: 8,644
- Time zone: UTC+3 (EAT)
- Postcode: 33601
- UFI: -2571388

Nansio is a small Tanzanian port town and capital of Ukerewe District in Mwanza Region. The town is also a ward on the island of Ukerewe, Lake Victoria, in Tanzanian lake territory. Nansio is a port of entry for passenger and freight shipping services from the city of Mwanza.

The ward of Nansio is one of twenty-four in the district of Ukerewe. In 2016 the Tanzania National Bureau of Statistics reported there were 8,644 people in the ward, up from 7,674 in 2012.

== Villages ==
The ward has 15 villages.

- Namagubo “A”
- Namagubo “B”
- Barazani
- Posta “A”
- Posta “B”
- Mashine ya Maji
- Mdoe
