= At the Edge of Thim =

Stageplay by Ebrahim Hussein

Kwenye Ukingo wa Thim (At the Edge of Thim) was written by Tanzanian playwright Ebrahim Hussein in 1988 and translated into English in 2000 by Kimani Njogu. Similar to many of Hussein's plays, At the Edge of Thim deals with the struggle between custom and modernity. After the death of Herbert Palla the family and friends alike are left to deal with how to grieve this loss while still confronting the power structure that defines their decisions.

== Plot Synopsis ==
=== Scene One - At The House ===
The play opens on Stella, the Palla family's maid, cleaning their expensively furnished home. Martha Palla, the matriarch of the house, enters, and asks Stella to clean the gun that is mounted on the wall, and make sure that the rooms are ready for the coming guests. Herbert Palla briefly enters, then heads out to the garden, followed by George, his brother, who has come to visit him. George confronts Herbert about how long it has been since Herbert has returned to their home, and Herbert deflects, making excuses for why he still cannot go. Herbert and his dog, Elsa, exit, leaving George alone in the space. The scene shifts to later that same day, and George is still alone. He stokes the fire, and speaks about seeing “a hand removing all injustices and the scars of life which have been overburdening us from the time immemorial.” Stella enters and George tells Stella about the gun, the same one Martha previously asked Stella to clean. George tells Stella that the gun has been passed down to him by his father, and that he once dropped it and dented it, causing his father to be furious at him. He describes the gun as “talisman which protected us from our enemies.” Martha enters, interrupting their conversation, takes the gun from George and puts it back on the wall. Later, the pastor arrives at the house to greet Martha and Herbert, and to give his blessing to the coming guests. Martha urges Herbert to sign “the document”, and he deflects, saying he will sign it later. They head to the airport to pick up their guests, their son Chris and his girlfriend Jean. George enters with Lydia, and the two discuss Lydia's fleeting relationship with Martha and Herbert's son, Chris. She describes the disadvantages she feels as a “rural girl” in a place where everything around her is modern. Lydia leaves. Later, in the same place, a party is being held to celebrate Chris’ arrival, and all of the family, as well as new characters like Uncle Ben, and young man called Ali are present. There is dancing and conversation. Herbert calls for a “final dance” before exiting stage. Several lines later, it is revealed that Herbert has died.

=== Scene Two - At Home ===
The scene begins with a Ghost, who is speaking to a sleeping George. The Old Man enters, who is the gravedigger, and speaks briefly to the Ghost about the Palla clan's traditional resting place. Lydia enters and speaks to briefly to the gravedigger about Herbet, and how his life in the city has affected his ties to his home. Two workers enter briefly, and tell the gravedigger and Lydia that they are hoping to repair the road; the gravedigger objects, saying that it is the duty of the community to fix itself, that it is not up to government intervention. Later, in the same place, the Ghost is again speaking to George, this time about “the edge of thim”, or no man's land. The Old Man then enters and send George to the city to get the body, so that Herbert can be buried at home, as they wish.

=== Scene Three - Chira ===
Scene three opens in the family home. All of the frivolous decor has been stripped away and Chris and Martha sit the table. Chris struggles with understanding his identity while Martha tries to comfort and reassure him. She does not make much headway with Chris and starts to give him her own insight on her perspective on being Herbert's wife, and since she is not a part of his clan she was left with nothing. George then enters wanting to discuss the details of wear the body will be buried. This is the central conflict between George and Martha because they both feel that they have complete agency over where the body will be buried. Martha has no way of proving she knows exactly what her husband would have wanted (she does not have the documents) and after arguing with Georger about it, she orders him out of the house. Insulted by this, George says she will be sorry when he comes back. Moments after George leaves Martha lies on the sofa, and the noise of an angry crowd starts growing. Stones are being thrown through the window. Martha orders the dog Elsa to chase the people away as she calls the police. Next the scene shifts to Martha speaking with the Pastor. She expresses to the Pastor how she doesn't know how she will keep on going and he reminds her to leave everything up to God. This is another moment where Martha addresses the specific challenges that come with being a woman and a wife in this society. Suddenly George enters and runs out with the documents. Martha picks up the gun and is ready to shoot him. The Pastor stops her by telling her to denounce Satan.

=== Scene Four - The Ruined Foundation ===
Now the veranda is also devoid of any decor and Stella is removing cushions from the chairs. Everything is being removed from the home. The Umma is selling the house and Chris has no say in the matter because he was born out of wedlock. The state of the house is chaotic, Jean keeps dropping boxes. Chris leaves and has to go to remand and they discuss Uncle Ben and how he might be guilty or the culprit of something. There is a shift and we see Jean and Lydia. They speak for a bit and they begin talking about the role of women in this society. Lydia explains to her that there are two roles for women in this structure; one has respectability and the other just has a room somewhere. The other gets gifts, jewelry and clothing. The Pastor enters, Jean tells him that Chris wants nothing to do with the clan or the village and the Pastor does not want to hear any of this. It is revealed that Martha and Elsa have died and the Pastor unapologetically calls this their chira. When Chris re-enters Stella hands him the gun, as per Georges gun. Chris looks at the gun and it is the clan gun.

== Characters ==
Dr. Herbert Palla, Mrs. Martha Palla - Herbert's Wife, George Palla - Herbert's brother, Chris Palla - Herbert's son, Stella Palla (his servant), Elsa (his dog), Pastor, Jean, Lydia, Uncle Ben (his brother in law), Grave digger (an old man), District Commissioner, Permanent Secretary, Shop Keeper, Janeko, Ghost, Worker 1, Worker 2, Voice, Villager

== Context ==
Silvano Melea Otieno was a criminal lawyer in Nairobi and the story of his death and the events that follow parallel the one told in Kwenye Ukingo wa Thim (At the Edge of Thim). Both him and his wife were known for being wealthy, educated Kenyans and turned their back on their ethnic community, while his brother stayed loyal to clan. In Burying SM the life of Mr. Otieno was fleshed and it showed how highly he was held in his society. They represented the emerging Kenyan burgeoisie that was closely related to material wealth and success and more western ideals of fulfillment. In December 1986, Mr. Otieno, often referred to as SM, died while at his holiday home in Upper Matasia. The controversy began when his wife and his brother disputed over where to bury his body. The court cases brought up into question the weight of customary law versus statuary and common law. The verdict of the court decision revealed that ethnic interests and the concerns of the clans and families hold more significance than common laws introduced during colonization.

== Symbols and Themes ==
=== The Gun ===
The gun is first seen as a piece of decor in the Palla house and is continuously brought up after that. George once dented it in his childhood; it was used to protect their family against enemies; it falls off the wall and goes off accidentally; Martha attempts to shoot George with it; it was involved with the death of Martha because it misfired; George hands Chris the gun at the end of the play.

=== Chira ===
a Dholuo word which means bad luck: bad luck that befalls a man or woman as a result of one's wrongdoing. Hussein uses chira as a concept to portray a cultural theme. This notion of chira also “depicts the tension between custom and modernity, between marriage and respectability.” What unfolds for the Palla family is their chira, a product of their wrongdoing. In this society it is wrong to leave your clan and turn your back on traditions in exchange for a more modern and material life.
