= Mr. Myombekere and His Wife Bugonoka, Their Son Ntulanalwo and Daughter Bulihwali =

1980 novel by Aniceti Kitereza

Mr. Myombekere and his wife Bugonoka, their son Ntulanalwo and daughter Bulihwali
- Cover of the 1980 Swahili edition
- Author: Aniceti Kitereza
- Original title: Bwana Myombekere na Bibi Bugonoka, Ntulanalwo na Bulihwali
- Translator: Gabriel Ruhumbika
- Language: Kerewe; Swahili
- Genre: African novel
- Published: Swahili edition 1980, English 2002 (originally written in Kerewe in 1945)
- Publisher: Tanzania Publishing House, Mkuki na Nyota
- Publication place: Tanzania
- Pages: 770
- OCLC: 52786926

Mr. Myombekere and His Wife Bugonoka, Their Son Ntulanalwo and Daughter Bulihwali (original title: Bwana Myombekere na Bibi Bugonoka, Ntulanalwo na Bulihwali) is a novel by Tanzanian author Aniceti Kitereza. The novel is an extended story depicting historical life of the Kerewe through three generations. After its original Swahili publication in 1980, it has been translated into German, Swedish, French and English.

== History ==
The novel was first published in 1980 in Swahili by Walter Bgoya, the general manager of Tanzania Publishing House. Originally, Kitereza had written the manuscript in 1945 in his mother tongue Kerewe. As no publishing house wanted to publish a novel in this endangered language, Kitereza himself translated the manuscript into Swahili, but it took 35 years before it could be published in 1980 in two volumes comprising 617 pages.

== Reception ==
Since then, the novel has been translated into German, French, Swedish and English. It was the first novel written in Kerewe, and has been judged as the most comprehensive novel on pre-colonial life and customs published in an African language.

The German translation was published first in 1990 in two parts with posthumous titles and notes, explaining the cultural and linguistical background a reader may need. The French translation by Simon Baguma Mweze and Olivier Barlet was also published in two parts in 1999 as Les Enfants du faiseur de pluie and Le Tueur de serpents by L'Harmattan. The Swedish translation is based on the German, but only the first part was published.

The English version of 2002 by Gabriel Ruhumbika was translated directly from Kerewe to English, thus being the only translation not having passed via Swahili. It was published by Mkuki na Nyota publishers in Dar es Salaam. In 2022, the same Tanzania publisher released a monographic work about Aniceti Kitereza written by literary scholar Shoonie (Charlotte) Hartwig.

In his 1984 article titled Autonomous Publishing in Africa: The Present Situation, Walter Bgoya wrote about his decision to publish Kitereza's novel:

For many years the foreign publishers would not take it on because they believed there was no market for it. When I received and read a copy of the manuscript, in the old man's extremely beautiful handwriting, I knew immediately that this was going to be probably the most important literary work that I would publish. It has been very well received.

— Walter Bgoya, Autonomous Publishing in Africa: The Present Situation
