= Henry Chakava =

Kenyan publisher (1946–2024)

- Born: Henry Miyinzi Chakava; 26 April 1946; Kenya
- Died: 8 March 2024 (aged 77); Nairobi, Kenya
- Education: Friends School Kamusinga; University of Nairobi
- Occupation: Publisher
- Years active: 1972–2024
- Known for: Founding African Publishing Institute (API); African Publishers Network (APNET); Jomo Kenyatta Prize for Literature; Kenya Book Development Council; East African Book Development Council; Kenya Publishers Association
- Awards: The 2006 Prince Claus Awards; 2000 Zimbabwe International Book Fair Award

Henry Chakava (26 April 1946 – 8 March 2024) was a Kenyan publisher. He focused on the publication of books particularly in East Africa and has been described as "the father of Kenyan publishing" for being a pioneer publisher in Kenya who promoted free speech through literature. For his contribution to educational and cultural literature in East Africa, he received several awards.

== Early life and education ==
Henry Miyinzi Chakava was born on 26 April 1946 in Vokoli Vihiga County, Kenya Colony. He began his career after completing his studies in literature and philosophy in 1972.

== Career ==
=== Publishing ===
Chakava started out as an apprentice editor and later became chief editor of Heinemann Educational Books, where he was involved in the publication and promotion of many notable African writers, including Ali Mazrui, Chinua Achebe, Marjorie Oludhe Macgoye, Meja Mwangi, Ngũgĩ wa Thiong'o and Okot p'Bitek.

In 1992, Chakava founded East African Educational Publishers, which later expanded with establishments in Uganda and Tanzania.

Chakava published a great number of educational and cultural books that have had a major importance in eastern Africa. His publications included school books for primary and tertiary education that signified an important renewal in view of the subjects that were written from an African perspective. Previously, many school books in East Africa were influenced greatly by a Western viewpoint.

Also in the cultural field, Chakava came with innovating publications. Besides books in the English language, he published in local languages, at a time when local languages were still seen by governments and authorities as state-subversive. Furthermore he published books with a critical stance on local governments. Challenging the boundaries of the freedom of expression, he took great risks and in fact, was repeatedly threatened.

Chakava was the author of the 1996 book Publishing in Africa: One Man's Perspective, for which Chinua Achebe wrote a brief introduction.

To celebrate Henry Chakava's 70th birthday, a number of key personalities in the publishing world authored a book, Coming of Age: Strides in African Publishing, published by East African Educational Publishers Ltd, Nairobi Kenya. The new release, published in April 2016, is a collection of essays in honour of Dr Henry Chakava @70.

He is remembered for founding African Publishers Network (APNET), his permanent membership of the Council of Management of the African Books Collective (ABC) and the African Publishing Institute (API). API had partnerships such as the Dag Hammarskjöld Foundation, the World Bank, Norwegian Aid, and the Canadian International Development Agency to enhance African literature. He also founded the Jomo Kenyatta Prize for Literature, jointly with the Shah and Rhughani families of the Text Book Centre. He is also credited with drafting the copyright act of Kenya.

=== University lecturer ===
Henry Chakava was a visiting lecturer at Oxford Brookes University.

== Death ==
Chakava died in Nairobi on 8 March 2024, at the age of 77.

== Recognition ==
Chakava received several awards. Here follows a selection:

- 1984: Award for extraordinary service to Kenya, by President Moi
- 2000: Zimbabwe International Book Fair Award
- 2005: Honorary doctorate from Oxford Brookes University
- 2006: Prince Claus Award

== See also ==
- Walter Bgoya
