= Gabriel Ruhumbika =

Tanzanian novelist (born 1938)

Gabriel Ruhumbika (born 1938) is a Tanzanian born novelist, short story writer, translator and academic. His first novel, Village in Uhuru, was published in 1969. He has written several subsequent novels in Swahili. He has also taught literature at a number of universities, and, until his retirement in 2016, he was a professor of Comparative Literature at the University of Georgia in the USA.

== Early life ==
Ruhumbika was born in 1938 on Ukerewe Island of Ukerewe District in Lake Victoria of modern day Mwanza Region. After studying for an undergraduate degree at the Makerere University in Uganda, then Makerere College of the University of London, he completed a PhD (Docteur de l'Université) at the University of Paris-Sorbonne in France.

== Career ==
Ruhumbika's first novel, Village in Uhuru, was published in 1969; this was the second English-language Tanzanian novel, after Peter Palangyo's Dying in the Sun (1968). This is a historical novel, based on real events relating to questions of ethnic and national identity in the context of the Tanganyika African National Union's struggles for sovereignty in Tanganyika (now Tanzania). Although Village in Uhuru was written and first published in English, Ruhumbika decided to write all of his subsequent novels in Swahili, a decision similar to that of Kenyan writer Ngũgĩ wa Thiong'o.

His Swahili-language novels, which mainly cover the Pan-African Uhuru Movement, include Miradi Bubu ya Wazalendo (Silent Empowerment of the Compatriots, 1991), Janga Sugu la Wazawa (Everlasting Doom for the Children of the Land, 2002) and Wacha Mungu wa Bibi Kilihona (The God-loving Children of Grandma Kilihona), 2014. He also wrote a collection of short stories, Uwike Usiwike Kutakuche (Whether the Cock Crows or Not It Dawns). Outside of his own writings, he has worked as a translator, mainly from French to Swahili, although he also translated Aniceti Kitereza's novel Myombekere and His Wife Bugonoka, Their Son Ntulanalwo, and Daughter Bulihwali from Kikerewe into English. Ruhumbika is a nephew of Kitereza and had unique access to the Kitereza’s manuscripts and diaries.

Ruhumbika has also taught literature at various universities, in both Africa and the USA. He has lectured at the University of Dar es Salaam (from 1970 to 1985) and Hampton University in Virginia (from 1985 to 1992). From 1992 until he retired in 2016, he was a Professor of Comparative Literature at the University of Georgia.
