= Kenjo Jumbam =

Cameroonian writer

Kenjo Jumbam was a renowned Cameroonian writer, best known for his novel The White Man of God, which became a staple in secondary schools across Anglophone Cameroon.

== Early life and education ==
Born in Banso, Cameroon he studied in Leeds where he perfected his writing skills and began his first interaction with publishing houses. While at the University of Leeds he sent his first manuscript, a love story, to Heinemann which was rejected by the publishing house.

== Career ==
He had been writing for five years when Heinemann accepted Jumbam's Lukong and the Leopard with The White Man of Cattle for young readers in 1975, described as "an unassuming pair of beautifully told tales …intended for secondary school students but a pleasure for all ages" by a renowned critic, Stephen Arnold.

Then, in 1980, The White Man of God was published in the African Writers Series. The White Man of God records the coming of age of Tansa as he faces the complexities of Christianity, especially the concept of a loving God (father) who can send his children to hell.

His literary works, including The White Man of Cattle and Lukong and the Leopard were widely read and even adopted in schools in Northern Nigeria and East Africa.

== Death ==
He died in 2005 in his native Nso, leaving behind a legacy that continues to influence Cameroonian literature.
