= Tubah =

Coordinates: 6.4704°N 10.4397°E

- Commune and town
- Interactive map of Tubah
- Country: Cameroon
- Time zone: UTC+1 (WAT)

Tubah is a town and commune in Cameroon. It is found in the Mezam Division, in North West Region of Cameroon.

== See also ==
- Communes of Cameroon
