= Erica Sugo Anyadike =

Tanzanian writer

Erica Sugo Anyadike is a Tanzanian writer based in Kenya and was shortlisted for the 2020 Caine Prize. Her 2019 short story "How to Marry an African President" was also shortlisted for the Commonwealth Short Story Prize and for the Queen Mary Wasafiri Writing Prize. She began her career as a television writer
