= Elieshi Lema =

Tanzanian writer and publisher (born 1949)

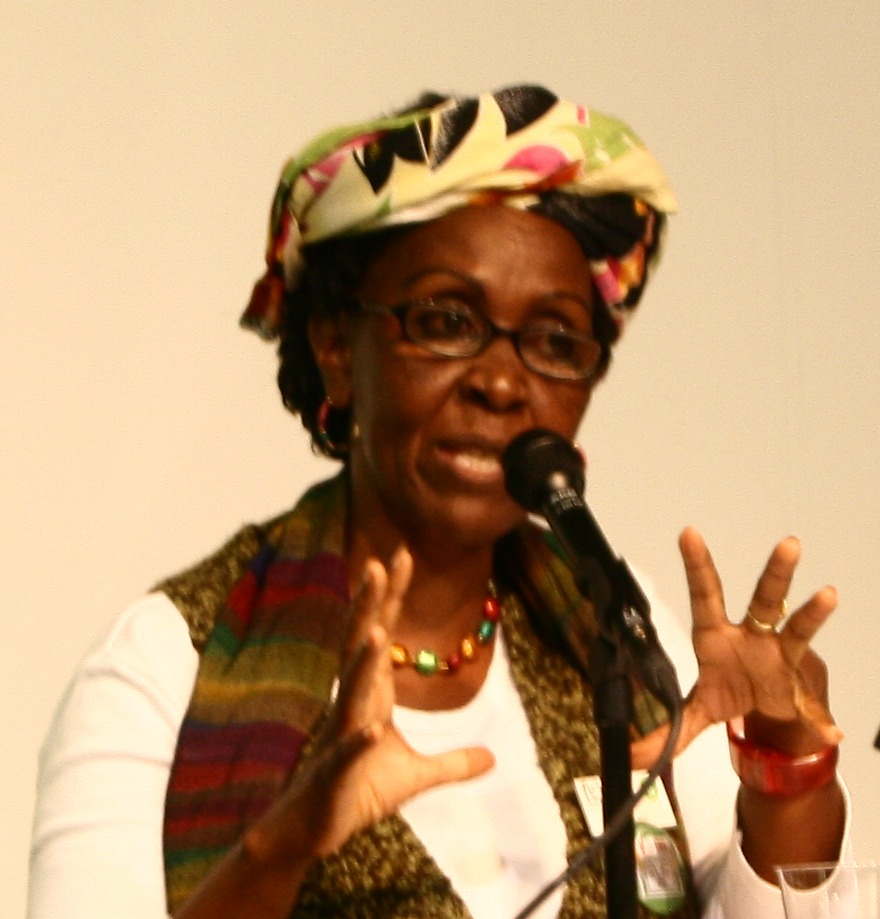
- Born: 1949 (age 76–77); Moshi District, Kilimanjaro Region, Tanzania
- Education: University of Dar es Salaam
- Occupations: Writer; Publisher
- Writing career
- Language: Swahili and English
- Period: 1995–present
- Genre: Poetry, Novel, Children's literature
- Notable work: Safari ya Prospa, Parched Earth

Elieshi Lema (born 1949) is a Tanzanian writer and publisher, also active in Tanzania's civil society.

== Biography ==
Lema was born and raised in the village of Nronga in Moshi District of Kilimanjaro Region. She studied library science and worked at the national library. She continued her education by studying English literature at the University of Dar es Salaam and creative writing at San Francisco State University.

Lema began writing poetry and then children's books in Swahili. Her short story Mwendo dealt with cultural practices harmful to the girl child in Tanzania. In 2001, she wrote her first novel titled Parched Earth in English. This novel has been translated into Swedish and French and received honourable mention for the Noma Award for Publishing in Africa. Another of her books for young adults in English, called In the Belly of Dar es Salaam, was on the shortlist for the Burt Award for African Literature. As a co-editor, she also published works by Tanzania's first president Julius Nyerere, titled Nyerere on Education: Selected Essays and Speeches.

Lema is co-owner of the publishing house E&D Vision Publishing, which also operates a book café in Dar es Salaam. E&D Vision Publishing mainly has published children's books, textbooks and titles about African history, both in Swahili as well as in English. In 1998, they published the first booklet for young readers on the history of the Dinosaurs of Tendaguru, which also became known as recommended reading in Kenyan schools.

Both as a writer of young adult literature as well as a publisher and educator, Lema has focussed on books for children as the basis for a publishing industry in her country. She is also a founding director for the Tanzania Cultural Trust Fund. Further, she has served on the board for the African Publishers Network, Haki Elimu, the Tanzania Gender Networking Programme, the Tanzania Media Fund and on the executive board for the Publishers Association of Tanzania, as well as the Children's Book Network.

In an interview about her experience about the challenges of building a sustainable reading culture in East Africa, she said:

One of the most important things is the political will for governments to invest in sustaining a reading culture – it's not something that is easy and can be done within three years of promotion. It has to be constantly addressed. It is getting worse because facilities like rural libraries, and community libraries do not exist, so people have no access to books. Access is only found in schools. And then the moment children graduate from primary schools, they get into communities where there's nothing to read. And within two to three years, they've fallen back into illiteracy or semi-literacy.

— Elieshi Lema, Tanzanian writer and publisher

== Selected works ==
As author:

- Safari ya Prospa (Prospaʹs journey) 1995
- Mwendo , 1998
- Parched Earth, 2001
- The Man from Tanga: A Reader on HIV, 2007
- In the Belly of Dar es Salaam, E & D Vision Publishing, 2011
- with graphic artist M. Sagikwa: Ndoto Ya Upendo, 2017

As editor:

- The Future of African Indigenous Publishing: Report of the Dag Hammarskjold Foundation Seminar Held at Arusha, Tanzania, March 25th-28th 1996.
- with I. M. Omari and Rakesh Rajani: Nyerere on Education: Selected Essays and Speeches. Dar es Salaam: Haki Elimu, 2006

== Reception ==
In her 2013 scholarly article in a French scientific journal, Flavia Aiello Traoré highlighted the interplay between literature, education, and culture, stating that Lema's work has significantly contributed to Tanzania's literary and educational landscape. According to the study, the context of children's literature in Tanzania is closely tied to public education and the promotion of Swahili as the national language. Swahili was introduced as the medium of instruction after independence, but challenges remain in its consistent application across all educational levels. From the 1990s onwards, initiatives like the "Children’s Book Project" improved literacy rates and supported local publishing. Despite progress, Tanzania's children's literature sector faces obstacles such as limited resources, underdeveloped markets, and inconsistencies in educational quality.

As the founder of her own publishing house, E&D Limited, her works have aimed to support public education while nurturing children's curiosity, identity, and self-esteem. Further, she often addresses important themes such as cultural traditions, children's rights, education, and gender equality. Lema's storytelling also has incorporated Tanzanian oral traditions and realistic character portrayals to engage young readers.

== See also ==
- Swahili literature
- Demere Kitunga
- Walter Bgoya
- African Books Collective

== Literature ==
- Geuza, Z. (2024-09-30). Feminist Publishing Practices in Tanzania (1980s to 2020s): Creating Reading Publics and Inclusive Knowledge Bases (PDF). University of Exeter. hdl:10871/137619.
