= African Minds =

Nonprofit open access publisher based in Cape Town

- Founded: 2012
- Founder: Francois van Schalkwyk
- Country of origin: South Africa
- Headquarters location: Cape Town
- Distribution: Sula Books; African Books Collective
- Key people: Thierry Luescher; Patricio Langa; Imkhitha Nzungu
- Fiction genres: scholarly research
- No. of employees: 1
- Official website: http://www.africanminds.co.za/

The State of Open Data, a 2019 book from African Minds

African Minds is a nonprofit open access scholarly book publisher based in Cape Town, South Africa. The publishing house was founded in 2012 to

- promote open access publishing, initially in the social sciences
- provide publishing opportunities for researchers in Africa or those with a close affinity and interest in the development of Africa
- develop a better understanding of the scholarly publishing landscape in Africa
- foster openness and debate in the pursuit of growing and deepening the African knowledge base.

African Minds is a member of the Open Access Scholarly Publishers Association, ScholarLed, OAPEN, and ScienceOpen.

Trustee and founder of African Minds, Dr Francois van Schalkwyk, is reporting as saying that academic publishing in developing markets cannot consistently be profitable, and consequently, nonprofit organizations like African Minds should be available to provide new publishing models to promote research in the scientific periphery. African Minds follows a hybrid open access publishing model: the costs of some titles attract book processing charges (equivalent to gold open access), while the costs of other titles are fully covered by African Minds (equivalent to diamond open access).

The focus of the model is on the widest possible dissemination of publications rather than on book sales. To achieve this, African Minds titles are available in digital and print format, the latter via its distribution partners, Sula Books and African Books Collective. Digital books are available via the publisher's website, OAPEN, Directory of Open Access Books (DOAB), ScienceOpen and on a subscription basis from the Open Book Collective.

African Minds also publishes the FicSci series, a hybrid creative science communication project. The fourth volume in the series, titled rock_time, was edited by Mehita Iqani and Wamuwi Mbao and published on 8 July 2026.
