= Issa G. Shivji =

Tanzanian academic (born 1946)

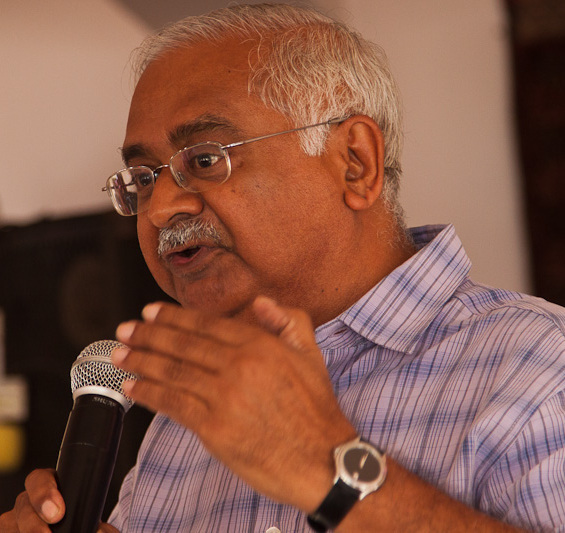
- Professor "Emeritus" Issa Shivji
- Born: 15 July 1946 (age 80); Kilosa, Tanganyika
- Education: University of East Africa (LL.B); London School of Economics (LL.M); University of Dar es Salaam (PhD)
- Known for: Land Law, Constitutional Law
- Children: Amil Shivji
- Scientific career
- Fields: Law
- Workplaces: University of Dar es Salaam

Issa Gulamhussein Shivji (born 15 July 1946) is a Tanzanian author and academic, and an experts on law and development issues. He has taught and worked in universities all over the world. He is a writer and researcher, producing books, monographs and articles, as well as a weekly column printed in national newspapers.

== Biography ==
Born in Kilosa, Tanzania in 1946, Shivji worked for 36 years as a professor in constitutional law in the University of Dar es Salaam's Faculty of Law. He is a professor of international renown, having built his reputation through the publication of more than 18 books, along with multiple articles and book chapters. Shivji has served as advocate of the high court and the Court of Appeal of Tanzania since 1977 and advocate of the high court in Zanzibar since 1989. He has received several national and international distinguished scholar awards, including an honorary doctorate from the University of East London, UK and one from Rhodes University, South Africa. Shivji has devoted most of his life to addressing issues on the exploitation of Tanzanians through both the national and the international economic and legal orders. Shivji presently occupies the Mwalimu Julius Nyerere Research Chair in Pan-African Studies of the University of Dar es Salaam. Most recently, he has been working on the political economy of economic reforms in Tanzania. While mostly based in Tanzania, he has been visiting professor in various locations: El Colegio De Mexico, the University of Zimbabwe, the University of Warwick, the National Law School of India University, the University of Hong Kong, the Centre of African Studies of the University of Cape Town, South Africa, the Institute for Poverty, Land and Agrarian Studies at the University of the Western Cape and CODESRIA, Dakar, Senegal.

Shivji earned his LL.M and PhD at the London School of Economics and Political Science (LSE) and the University of Dar es Salaam respectively. He also holds an LL.B from the University of Dar es Salaam in Tanzania. He is married with children, his son Amil Shivji is a filmmaker.

== Honours and awards ==
=== Honorary degrees ===
- University of East London, Honoris Causa (LL.D), 1997

== Select publications ==
- Where is Uhuru? Reflections on the Struggle for Democracy in Africa. Pambazuka Press. 2009.
- "Silences in NGO Discourse: The role and future of NGOs in Africa". Pambazuka Special Report 14. Symposium on NGOs, Arusha, Tanzania, 28–29 November 2005. Nairobi: Fahamu Books. 2006.
- "Pan Africanism in Nyerere's Thoughts". Pambazuka News (431). Dar es Salaam: Fahamu Books. 2009.
- Pan-Africanism or Pragmatism: Lessons of the Tanganyika-Zanzibar Union. Mkuki na Nyota. 2008. doi:10.2307/j.ctvk3gmcd.
- The Concept of Human Rights in Africa. CODESRIA. 1989. ISBN 978-1-870784-02-3.
- Poems for the Penniless. Daraja Books. 2019. ISBN 978-1-988832-17-3.
