= Penina Muhando =

Tanzanian writer (born 1948)

- Born: 1948 (age 77–78); Tanganyika Territory
- Other name: Penina Mlama
- Education: University of Dar es Salaam
- Occupations: Playwright; Academic; Theatremaker
- Organization: Forum for African Women Educationalists

Penina Muhando, also known as Penina Mlama (born 1948), is a Tanzanian Kiswahili playwright, a theorist and practitioner of Theatre for Development in Tanzania.

== Life and literary career ==
Muhando was born in Berega, Morogoro Region in Tanzania in 1948. She gained a BA degree in theatre arts, a BA in education, and a PhD in language and linguistics from the University of Dar es Salaam.

Muhando was among a group of Tanzanian playwrights in the late 1960s and early 1970s who emerged in the aftermath of President Julius Nyerere's Arusha Declaration in 1967. Ujamaa socialism became the guiding philosophy of the country. In this environment, theatres were discouraged from performing plays by foreign artists. Local playwrights were called upon by Nyerere to use their art as a means of disseminating the main concepts of ujamaa to the people of Tanzania and for art to serve as a means of development. Muhando faced a dilemma between writing in English and Kiswahili. Works in English would open up a global clientele but remain inaccessible to most Tanzanians who did not speak the language. Swahili would open up this national audience at the expense of the global. She decided to focus on writing in Kiswahili because she felt that theatre was primarily a tool of mass communication and being accessible to the Tanzanian population was more important.

Muhando's earlier works, such as Haitia (Guilt, 1972), are enthusiastic about the prospects of ujamaa socialism. However, in the late 1970s and 1980s, it began to be clear that the expectations that ujamaa had created with respect to deepening of democracy and development had not been met. Muhando, along with other writers became more critical in this period. In plays such as Nguzo Mama (Mother, the main pillar, 1982), Lina Ubani (There is an antidote for rot, 1984), and Mitumba Ndui (The Pox, 1989), she registered her disappointment by focusing on political corruption, jockeying for political power and the pursuit of personal profit over community development.

In 2013, Muhando was named the chairperson of BASATA (National Arts Council) by President Jakaya Kikwete for a three-year term.

== Academic career ==
Muhando rose to become Professor and Head of the Department of Theatre Arts at the University of Dar es Salaam.

She was one of the pioneers of Theatre for Development in Africa – a movement that sought to encourage marginalized people to use plays to engage in issues important to their lives within their communities and with experts. Alongside her colleague Amandina Lihamba, she pioneered a particularly in-depth approach with their Oxfam-funded project "Theatre for Social Development", which took place over eighteen months in Malya, in the Mwanza region of northern Tanzania. In 1996, Muhando and Lihamba's Tuseme project worked to empower secondary school girls through theatre.

Her most important publication, Culture and development: the popular theatre approach in Africa (1991), gives a historical overview of community performance and popular theatre in Tanzania, and explores the methods and practices that she developed throughout her community theatre work.

She also did important work on the aesthetics of African orature.

== Works ==
=== Plays ===
- Hatia (Guilt), 1972
- Tambueni haki zetu, 1973
- Heshima yangu, 1974
- Pambo (Decoration), 1975
- Harakati za ukombozi (Liberation Struggle), with Amandina Lihamba and Ndyanao Balisidya, 1982
- Nguzo mama (Mother Pillar), 1982
- Abjadi yetu, 1983
- Lina ubani (Antidote to Rot), 1984
- Talaki si mke wangu (Woman, I Divorce You)

=== Books ===
- Fasihi na sanaa za maonyesho (Literature and performing arts), 1976
- Culture and development: the popular theatre approach in Africa, 1991

=== Articles ===
- "Digubi: A Tanzanian Indigenous Theatre Form", The Drama Review, 1981
- "Tanzania's Cultural Policy And Its Implications For The Contribution Of The Arts To Socialist Development", Utafiti, 1985
- "Creating in the Mother-Tongue: The Challenges to the African Writer Today", Research in African Literatures, 21.4, 1990,: 5-14
- "Women's participation in Communication for Development: the popular theatre alternative in Africa", Research in African Literatures, 1991
- "African Perspectives on Programs for North American Students in Africa: The Experience of the University of Dar es Salaam", African Issues, 2000
- "Popular theatre and development‐challenges for the future: The Tanzanian experience", Contemporary Theatre Review, 2002
