= Ebrahim Hussein =

Tanzanian playwright and poet (born 1943)

- Born: 1943 (age 82–83) Lindi, Tanganyika Territory
- Occupation: Playwright, poet
- Period: 1967 - 1997
- Genre: Swahili theatre and poetry
- Notable works: Kinjeketile

Ebrahim Hussein (born 1943 in Lindi, Tanganyika Territory) is a Tanzanian playwright and poet. His first play, Kinjeketile (1969), written in Swahili, and based on the life of Kinjikitile Ngwale, a leader of the Maji Maji Rebellion, is considered "a landmark of Tanzanian theatre".

Hussein's work stands in a literary tradition expressed in the national language Swahili following the country's independence from the United Kingdom in 1961. Since his works, with the exception of Kinjeketile and another play, have not been translated, his work has not become well known outside of East Africa.

== Works and importance for Swahili theatre ==
Hussein was born into a family of Arab descent in Lindi, a town of the Swahili coast on the Indian Ocean in 1943. He was educated at the Aga Khan Secondary School in Dar es Salaam and at the University College Dar es Salam of the former University of Eastern Africa, where he studied French literature and theatre arts. Hussein's work stands in a theatrical tradition that was created after the country's independence from Great Britain in 1961. The decision for Swahili as the national language of Tanzania in 1964 favoured an independent drama literature that took a middle way between the traditions of the Swahili-speaking peoples of the coast and Zanzibar and the conventions of the European theatre.

Still a student, he wrote his first short plays Wakati Ukuta (Time is a Wall) and Alikiona (Consequences) in 1967. They focus on tensions between the old and new generations and the social tensions resulting from European colonialism. Although he accepted elements of the European notions of a "well-made play" in the tradition of Aristotle, like the picture-frame stage, he was also interested in traditional African theatrical forms and the expectations of the audience. Some of his plays, like Alikiona, incorporate elements of kichekesho, which is a comical interlude found in the middle of many taarab performances and in other plays, Hussein used Swahili traditions of storytelling (hadithi).

In 1969, Hussein wrote his first full-length play, Kinjeketile, based on the life of Kinjikitile Ngwale, a leading figure of the Maji Maji uprising during German colonial rule in East Africa. The play was directed by the East German literary scholar Joachim Fiebach, who was a visiting professor at the University of Dar es Salaam, and became a model for the new East African theatre. Starting with Kinjeketile, Hussein used elements of epic theatre as developed by German playwright Bertolt Brecht. During the following years, Kinjeketile became a sort of national epic, for the first time expressing anticolonial self-esteem in East African theatre. The text sold over 20,000 copies and was adopted as a textbook for secondary schools in the 1970s. Hussein himself translated Kinjeketile into English, and published by Oxford University Press in Dar es Salaam, the play became also known abroad.

During the early 1970s, Hussein studied at the Humboldt University in East Berlin and wrote his PhD dissertation "On the development of theatre in East Africa". Other plays include Mashetani (1971), an overtly political play, Jogoo Kijijini (1976), an experiment in dramatic performance, and Arusi (1980), in which Hussein's main character expresses disillusionment with the Tanzanian socialist practice of ujamaa. Hussein also wrote poetry in free verse, a new poetical form for Swahili literature that was also widely read in the schools and universities of East Africa. His works written in a poetic and, at the same time, modern language became a model for the socialist cultural policy of Tanzania, even if they contained ambiguous heroes, who sometimes doubt their actions. On the other hand, the "poetic, elliptic prose" of his later plays has been found difficult to appreciate.

In 1975 he began teaching theatre studies at the University of Daresalaam and temporarily directed their theatre group. Until his departure in 1986, he taught as a professor of theatre studies at this university. Since then, he has led a life without many contacts in his house in the district of Kariakoo.

== Works ==
=== Plays ===
- Kinjeketile, 1969
- Michezo ya kuigiza, 1970
- Mashetani, 1971
- Jogoo Kijijini and Ngao ya Jadi, 1976
- Arusi, 1980
- Jambo la maana, 1982
- Kwenye ukingo wa Thim, English translation At the edge of Thim, 1988
- Ujamaa

=== Short plays ===
- Wakati Ukuta (Time is a Wall), 1967
- Alikiona (Consequences), 1969

== Ngao ya Jadi ==
Hussein's play for one actor, Ngao ya Judi, tells the story of Sesota, a serpent, that terrorizes a village, so a young peasant is called upon to defeat Sesota. The peasant succeeds and the village rejoices. Over time, the evil the serpent brought grows again, causing the village to become more and more depraved. Eventually, Sesota returns, with no-one to challenge him.

This text is a retelling of a Swahili folk story in which Sesota is defeated by being trapped in a pot rather than killed and who eventually returns. In Hussein's version, Sesota represents colonialism that the "peasant" desperately tries to fight. Hussein speaks about how the remnants of colonialism still remain and that any amount of Western influence on African culture brings back that evil. Through this, the retelling also shows that there is no "good vs. evil" like in traditional stories, but that the world is rather morally grey. One significant moment is when the village is celebrating after Sesota's death; names of a variety of famous African writers and artists are listed. Here, Hussein seems to be criticizing his fellow artists, saying that their work only comes during moments of joy, rather than being used to combat oppression.

== Reception ==
Not least because of his political statement about the history of the Maji-Maji uprising, Hussein's play Kinjeketile became one of the standard Swahili texts in Tanzanian and Kenyan schools and was reprinted several times.

German literary scholar Joachim Fiebach published a German translation of Kinjeketile in his anthology of African plays in 1974. In his study of Hussein's work, he pointed out that the play's anti-colonial message of the conflict between the colonised and the colonisers had overshadowed a second more general meaning: According to Fiebach's analysis, the colonised Africans are not glorified, but lacking strategic vision, mired in trivial disputes and impeded by personal hostilities. Referring to Hussein's theatrical style, Fiebach described it as a “dramaturgy that seems to merge or mix adopted European models of an intimate theatre with non-Aristotelic and completely unique techniques.”

In his study on Hussein's importance for Swahili theatre, French scholar of African literature Alain Ricard wrote, "Ebrahim Hussein is the best known Swahili playwright, and Tanzania's most complex literary personality. Known first and foremost as a dramatist, he is also a theorist whose dissertation on the theatre in Tanzania remains the standard reference work. His plays are a corpus of theatrical material with great significance to an understanding of Tanzania's political and social development in relation to the Swahili/Islamic coastal culture, of which he is a part." Referring to the absence of Hussein's international recognition and the predicament of African literature written in African languages, Ricard wrote:

A truly innovative and creative writer, a perceptive thinker, a gifted poet, he has often suffered neglect precisely because he has remained steadfastly committed to Kiswahili. His predicament illustrates the double-bind situation that menaces African literature in African languages. An international reputation is only possible when African-language works are translated into European languages, but few African-language works are translated.

— Alain Ricard, Ebrahim's predicament, p. 178

While Hussein focused on research at the Humboldt University in East Berlin for his PhD thesis from 1970 to 1973, the first scholarly study of his work, Drama and National Culture: a Marxist Study of Ebrahim Hussein, a PhD thesis was published in 1989 by the US-American literary scholar Robert M. Philipson. In his 1999 review of Alain Ricard's study on Hussein, Philipson wrote: “Ebrahim Hussein is a difficult case. After Wole Soyinka and Athol Fugard, he is the most interesting and talented dramatist that Africa has produced, but his name is rarely mentioned in European studies on African literature. [...] The reason for this is simple: Hussein writes in Swahili, and his dramatic work, with the exception of Kinjeketile, has not been translated into a Western language.”

== Ebrahim Hussein Poetry Prize ==
The Ebrahim Hussein Poetry prize is an honour awarded annually since 2014 to the winner of the poetry contest under the same name. The contest was created by Safarani Seushi in line with the wish of the late Canadian filmmaker, Gerald Belkin (1940–2012). Belkin was in the process of creating this award, to be named after "his friend and renowned filmmaker and playwright, Professor Ebrahim Hussein", when he died. His goal in establishing the award and prize fund was to foster the careers of Swahili literary authors. The selected poems were published as Diwani ya tunzo ya ushairi ya Ebrahim Hussein (Anthology of Ebrahim Hussein Poetry Prize) in 2017.

== Ebrahim Hussein Fellowship ==
The Ebrahim Hussein Endowment for research in African expressive cultures was established in the College of Letters and Science at the University of Wisconsin–Madison in 2003, thanks to the generosity of Robert M. Philipson, an alumnus of the college (PhD, 1989). The college awards up to $7,500 each year to one or more full-time graduate students in there to carry out research on African expressive cultures and/or archives outside of the United States. Winners of the fellowship include Vincent Ogoti, a Kenyan playwright.
