= Amandina Lihamba =

Tanzanian actress and writer

- Born: 1944 (age 81–82); Morogoro District, Tanganyika Territory
- Education: University of Leeds
- Occupations: Actress; Director; Professor
- Notable work: Maangamizi: The Ancient One

Amandina Lihamba (born 1944) is a Tanzanian academic, actress, playwright and theatre director. She is a professor at the University of Dar es Salaam in the Department of Fine and Performing Arts and has served as its dean, head of department, and university council member. In 1989, she co-founded the national Children Theatre Project and festival. She also founded the girls drama group Tuseme (Let's Speak Out) festival with Penina Muhando in 1998.

== Biography ==
Lihamba was born in Morogoro region, Tanzania in 1944. She earned her Ph.D. from the University of Leeds. Her 1985 doctoral dissertation focussed on "Politics and Theatre in Tanzania after the Arusha Declaration 1967–1984". There, she describes how after the Arusha Declaration the Tanzanian verse drama ngonjera evolved from a propaganda tool of the ruling party into a subversive and syncretic form.

Apart from plays and children's books, Lihamba also wrote Hawala ya fedha, based on Senegalese film director Ousmane Sembène's The Money-Order.

== Selected works ==
=== Plays ===
- Harakati za ukombozi (2003)
- Hawala ya fedha (2004)

=== Fiction for young readers ===
- Mkutano wa pili wa ndege (1992)
- Nana, Upepo mwanana (1999)

== Filmography as actress or writer ==
- The Marriage of Mariamu (1985)
- Khalfan and Zanzibar (1999)
- Maangamizi: The Ancient One (2001)
