= Kerewe language =

Bantu language spoken in Tanzania

Kerebe
- Kerewe
- Ekikerebe
- Native to: Tanzania
- Region: Lake Victoria
- Ethnicity: Kerewe people
- Native speakers: (100,000 cited 1987)
- Language family: Niger–Congo?: Atlantic–Congo; Benue–Congo; Bantoid; Bantu; Northeast Bantu; Great Lakes Bantu; West Nyanza; Rutara; Kerebe

Language codes
- ISO 639-3: ked
- Glottolog: kere1283
- Guthrie code: JE.24

Kerewe, or Kerebe, is a Bantu language of Tanzania, spoken on Ukerewe Island in Lake Victoria, the largest inland island in Africa.

Kerewe phonology prohibits vowel sequences: if a vowel sequence arises in the underlying representation of a phrase, the sequence becomes either a long vowel or a glide followed by a long vowel in the surface representation.

== Literature ==
The first attempts at Bible translation into Kerewe were some Bible stories in 1899, liturgical Gospels in 1921 and 1937 and a Gospel harmony in 1930. The New Testament was translated into Kerewe by French Canadian Padri Almas Simard (1907-1954) from the White Fathers, working with several native speakers. The translation received the imprimatur on 4 October 1945. It was published as Omulago Muhya, (Kikahindurwa mu Kikerewe) at the White Fathers Mission Press in Bukerewe.

Aniceti Kitereza originally wrote the novel Mr. Myombekere and His Wife Bugonoka, Their Son Ntulanalwo and Daughter Bulihwali in Kerewe, before translating it into Swahili for publication.

== See also ==
- Kerewe people
