= African Publishers Network =

African professional organization

The African Publishers Network (APNET) is a pan-African and non-profitnetwork that exists to connect African publishing associations in order to exchange information and promote indigenous publishing.

== Introduction ==
Prior to the foundation of APNET in 1992, publishers in Africa had difficulty sharing information and learning from one another’s experiences. There was no publicly-accessible database containing the addresses of libraries, bookshops or fellow publishers, and there was no networking structure connecting the agencies.

After several conferences and seminars focused on solving problems within the African book trade, it was considered necessary to set up an umbrella body which would be a network of publishers in Africa. In 1992, delegates from nine countries founded the African Publishers Network at a conference in Harare, Zimbabwe. Headquarters were located in Abidjan, Côte d'Ivoire, with a research and documentation centre in Harare. However, due to the political situation in Côte d'Ivoire, APNET's headquarters was moved to Accra, Ghana.

APNET has evolved to become a diverse network representing most regions across Africa. It lists 41 national publishers associations as members. The governance of APNET consists of four key parts which are interdependent: the General Council represents the totality of African members and meets once a year; the board is representative of Anglophone, Francophone, and Lusophone Africa and is the executive arm of the council; the Secretariat, which consists of Executive Secretary and Administrative Officer, manages the daily concerns of APNET and aims to ensure it runs smoothly. The Secretariat also conducts unctions such as organizing training workshops, conferences and fundraising; the project committees oversee pertinent activities such as fulfilling research opportunities.

In addition, membership to APNET consists of four levels: full membership (granted to national publishing associations); founding membership (among the publishers from the nine countries that started APNET); affiliate membership (for those interested in the work of APNET – booksellers, editors, printers, designers, etc.); and associate membership for those with “an outstanding record of service to African publishing”.

== Accomplishments ==
APNET can claim many concrete achievements since its formation; in general, as an evaluation of APNET states: “The formation and revitalization of many national publishers associations are a direct result of APNET’s networking activities, most consistently through person-to-person contact and the publication of the African Publishing Review”. The African Publishing Review (APR) is a bi-monthly newsletter sent out to publishers’ associations, book development councils, libraries, etc., and other subscribers. For publishers in Africa, the APR is free of charge; however, other subscribers must pay a small fee. The African Publishing Review is the only pan-African publishing journal published in Africa with news, analysis, and in-depth perspectives of African Publishing. A survey was conducted and it showed that the APR is the “second most important source of information” to publishers after the national publishers associations. A survey by SIDA showed that the APR is the most frequently used form of APNET service. APNET has produced six other publications, including The Story of APNET, The Development Directory of Indigenous Publishing, African “Rights” Indaba, APNET Children’s Books Catalogue, the Catalogue of Agricultural Books Published in Africa, and Towards an African Publishing Institute.

The African universities lack programmes and classes for creating professional publishers: university training in this field is available only in Kenya, Uganda and South Africa, and these courses fall short of what is required. Based on the curriculum that was developed for the institute, APNET has conducted over 30 workshops in 18 countries.

Other publications of APNET include a development directory which contains 70 entries on key African book-development organizational and professional bodies; essays and reports on publishing in Africa; a resource centre which is a source of published and unpublished research on publishing in Africa.

APNET was jointly responsible with the Kenya Publishers Association for organizing the 2023 Nairobi International Book Fair, at which a significant publishing rights initiative was launched. Publishing professionals from Kenya, Ghana, Malawi, Nigeria, Rwanda, Tanzania and Uganda conferred with counterparts from Argentina, Brazil, France, Germany, India, Italy, the Netherlands, the UK and the USA at the fair's Right Café on such topics as trading and translation rights.

== Advocacy ==
APNET advocates for the African publishing industry through attending book fairs, both in Africa and internationally. APNET goes beyond attending and providing materials for the book fair; it enables other African exhibitors to attend through financial support. In addition, when a book fair is being organized in Africa, APNET offers its support by arranging its major meetings to occur during the dates of the event so that all will be in the area to attend.

Dialogue with the World Bank has proved to be a success for APNET. As the World Bank has reached a better understanding of APNET and dialogue has continued between the two, “APNET has been in a position to send out World Bank monthly operational summaries to the National Publishers Associations, which provides information and possible opportunities for publishers”

A trade and promotion programme is conducted through APNET, which allocates catalogues of African books and sources and disseminates orders to publishers.

UNESCO provided support for the KAWI project (also SAP KAWI project) to produce and illustrate popular science books for children in national and minority languages in Africa. African authors and illustrators were used to create the content which was translated into various languages.

== Works cited ==
- Chakava, Henry, Publishing in Africa: One Man’s Perspective, Nairobi: Bellagio Publishing Network, co-published with East African Educational Publishers Ltd, 1996.
- Christensen, Lars P., and others, Strengthening Publishing in Africa: An evaluation of Apnet, Sweden: Sida, 1998.
- Dekutsey, Woeli, The Story of APNET, Harare: African Publishers Network, commissioned by UNESCO, 1995.
- Kotei, S, The Book Today in Africa, France: UNESCO, 1981.
- Makotsi, Ruth, Expanding The Book Trade Across Africa: A Study of Current Barriers And Future Potential, Harare: ADEA Working Group on Books and Learning Materials, 2000.
