= Peter K. Palangyo =

Tanzanian novelist and diplomat

Peter K. Palangyo (1939 - 18 January 1993) was a Tanzanian novelist and diplomat. His reputation rests on a single novel, Dying in the Sun (1968), which is considered by many to be one of the most compelling works of modernism in African writing from this period.

== Biography ==
Born to Rwa parents in Meru District of Arusha Region, Palangyo was educated locally, in Uganda and the United States. He majored in biology at St. Olaf College in Northfield, Minnesota, and went on to graduate school at the University of Minnesota. Abandoning the sciences for literature, he earned a diploma of education from Makerere University College and taught in several secondary schools. In 1968, Palangyo returned to the United States to join the writers' workshop at the University of Iowa, and received an MFA in creative writing. Returning to Tanzania in 1972, he taught at the University of Dar es Salaam before joining the diplomatic service. At one point he was Tanzania's Ambassador to France. In 1980, he earned a PhD from University at Buffalo, The State University of New York, with a thesis on Chinua Achebe.

Palangyo died in a car accident in 1993.

== Works ==
- Dying in the Sun, London: Heinemann, 1968. African Writers Series 53.
