= Aniceti Kitereza =

Tanzanian cleric and novelist (1896–1981)

Aniceti Kitereza (1896–1981) was a Tanzanian Catholic cleric and novelist, born in 1896 on the island of Ukerewe, in Lake Victoria, in modern day Ukerewe District of Mwanza Region in Tanzania. In 1945, he wrote the first novel in Kikerewe, his native language. Only in 1980 was it published in Swahili, under the title Myombekere na Bugonoka na Ntulanalwo na Bulihwali.

== Life ==
Kitereza was the grandson of the king Machunda from the Silanga clan of the island of Ukerewe in Lake Victoria. He was born on the island of Ukerewe in Lake Victoria to a mother called Muchuma and her husband Malindima. In 1901 when Kitereza was a young boy of five, his father died of smallpox. Kitereza and his mother then went to live at the court of the Omukama or king Mukaka, who raised Kitereza as one of his own children. Determined to learn the secrets of white man's power and knowledge, Mukaka sent his sons and the sons of his close relatives to study with white missionaries at the Roman Catholic Mission School in nearby Kagunguli village. In contrast, other kings and traditional rulers elsewhere in the colony sent the sons of their slaves and servants to school in a place of their own sons to avoid the contamination of the white man's religion and education. Kitereza began schooling at Kagunguli Mission in 1905. There he was baptized and given the Christian name of Aniceti.

Two years later, in 1907, king Mukaka died and was succeeded by his son Ruhumbika who encouraged Kitereza to leave Kagunguli in 1909 to pursue further schooling at the Rubya Roman Catholic Seminary in today's Kagera Region near the Ugandan border. Kitereza studied at the Rubya Seminary for ten years advancing to senior seminary and mastering Latin, the medium of instruction in Roman Catholic seminaries. He also learned Greek, a requirement of the classical education of the seminary, as well as German, the language of the colonial masters. Kitereza also learned Swahili, the African language used as the lingua franca by Arab traders, slavers, and the coastal middlemen. After the German defeat in World War I, Kitereza also learned English. In addition to these languages, he studied theology and philosophy as part of his Roman Catholic priesthood training.

== Novel ==
Kitereza's novel titled in Swahili Bwana Myombekere na Bibi Bugonoka na ntulanalwo na bulihwali is an extended story of traditional life, depicting the history of the Kerewe through three generations. It was first published in 1980 in Swahili by Tanzania Publishing House, but had originally been written already in 1945 in Kitereza's mother tongue Kerewe. As no publishing house wanted to publish a novel in the endangered language Kerewe, Kitereza himself translated the novel into Swahili shortly before his own death, and it took another 35 years to find a publisher. The novel is the only one written in Kerewe, and the most comprehensive novel on pre-colonial life and customs published in an African language.

Since the Swahili edition in 1980, it has been translated into German, Swedish, French and English. The 2002 translation into English was published by Tanzanian publisher Mkuki na Nyota. It is the only translation directly from Kikerewe and was authored by Gabriel Ruhumbika, a Tanzanian writer, professor of literature and nephew of Kitereza. As such, he could consult the author’s manuscripts and diaries. The book also presents a comprehensive introduction and explanatory notes on the text.
