= Ukerewe Island =

Island in Ukerewe District, Mwanza Region, Tanzania

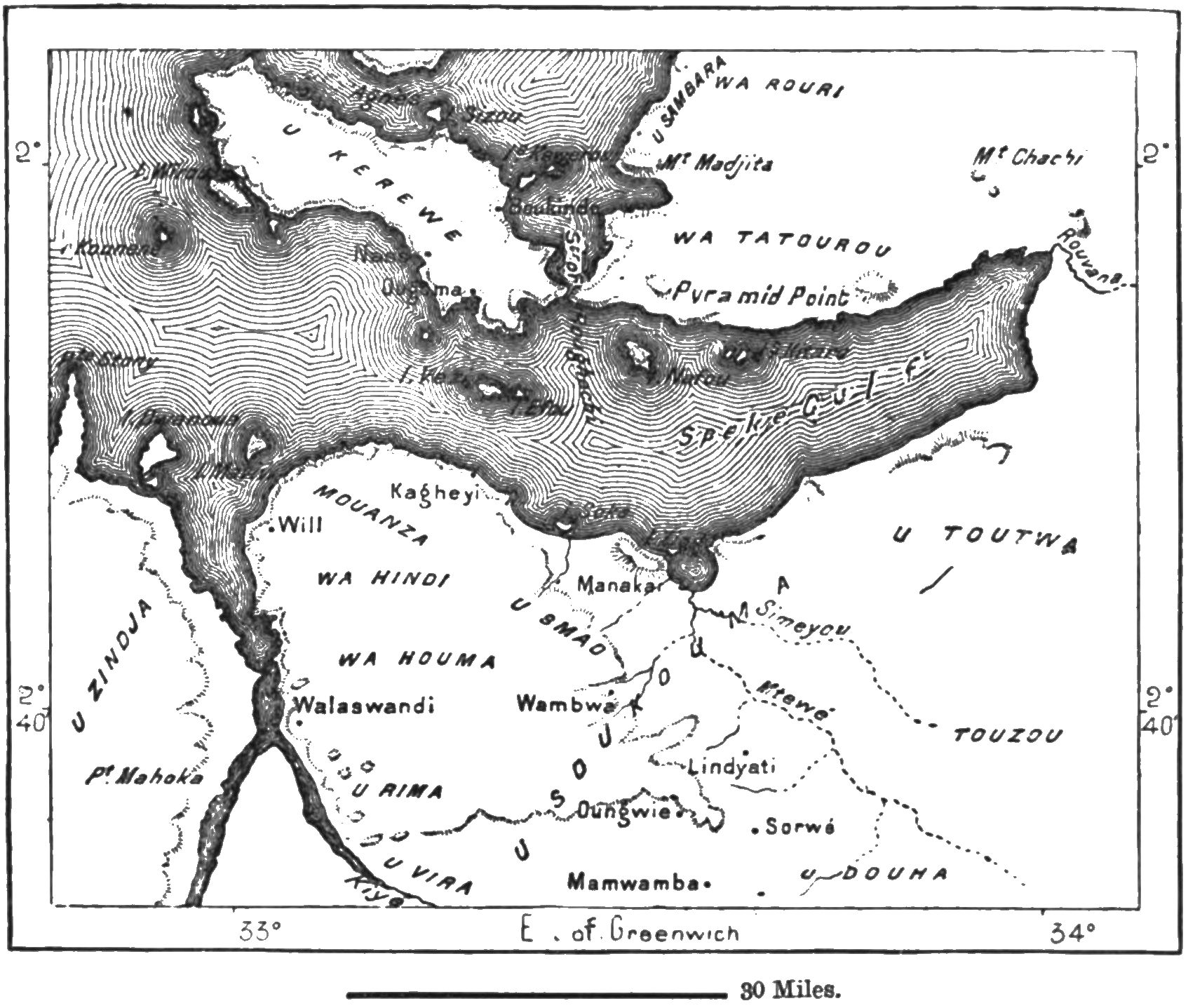
- Old map of Ukerewe Island

- Location within Tanzania

Geography
- Location: Lake Victoria
- Coordinates: 02°02′36″S 33°01′41″E
- Archipelago: Ukerewean Archipelago
- Length: 46 km (28.6 mi)
- Width: 20 km (12 mi)

Administration
- Tanzania
- Region: Mwanza Region
- District: Ukerewe District
- Largest settlement: Nansio

Demographics
- Demonym: Ukerewean
- Languages: Kerewe & Swahili
- Ethnic groups: Kerewe people

Ukerewe Island (Kisiwa cha Ukerewe in Swahili) is a freshwater island located in Lake Victoria. The island is administratively part of Ukerewe District in Mwanza Region, Tanzania. The island is the fifth-largest lake island in the world. With an area of 530 km^{2} (200 sq mi), it is also the largest island in Lake Victoria and the largest lake island in Africa.

Ukerewe Island is located 45 km (28 mi) north of the city of Mwanza to which it is linked by ferry. A ferry crossing of 3.8 km (2.4 mi) links the island to a dirt road on the eastern lake shore, which runs to Kibara and the city of Musoma in Mara Region. The shoreline of Ukerewe Island is carved into numerous bays and it is surrounded by at least a dozen smaller islands. Its largest community is the town of Nansio.

Settled since the 17th century, Ukerewe Island is a cultivated place in Africa, where most of the trees and plants are privately owned and grown, and where the Tsetse fly's absence enables a stable cattle population and an equally stable ranching and farming economy.

Ukerewe island is known for having a large population of Tanzanians with albinism. Many of the first of them to live there were taken to and abandoned on the island by their families as children. Despite comprising an exceptionally high percentage of the island's population, they are still, as throughout Tanzania, an oppressed minority on the island, though it appears to have avoided the killings of albinos, who are "harvested" for black magic rituals, that regularly occurs in Tanzania.

== Gallery ==
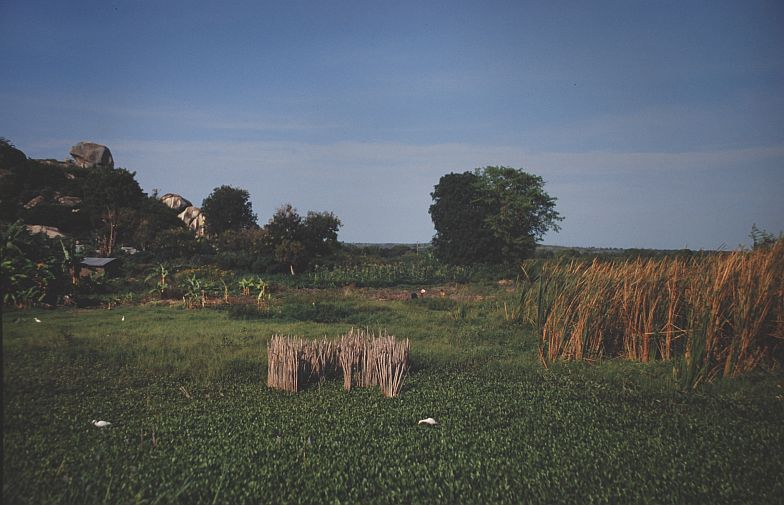
Coastal land, Ukerewe island, Tanzania

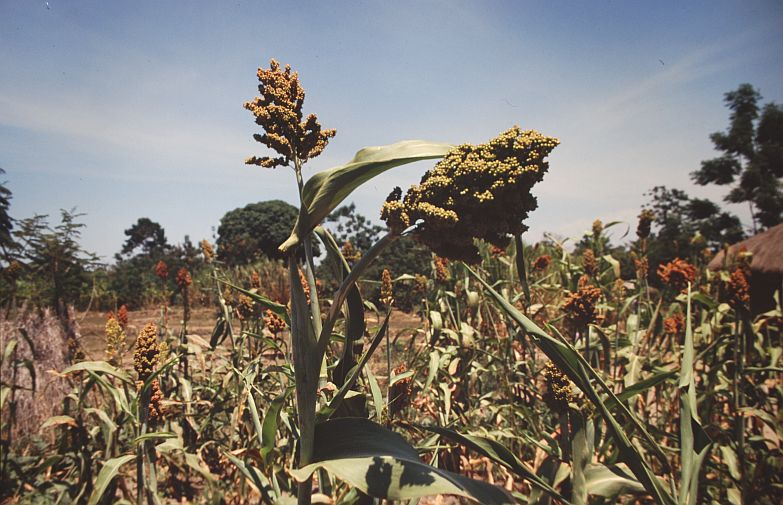
Sorghum field, Ukerewe island, Tanzania

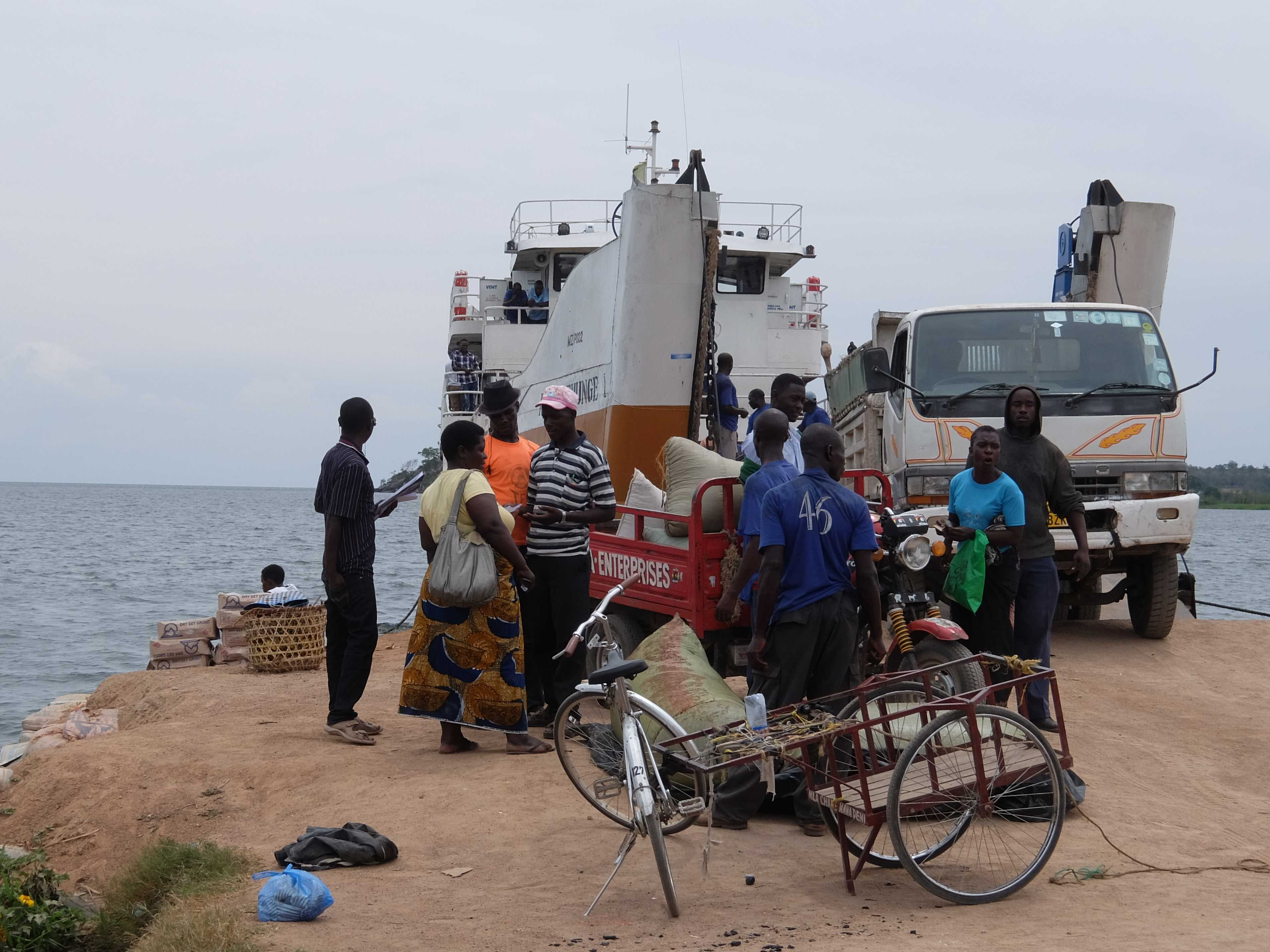
Ukerewe Island-Mwanza Ferry leaving the port of Nansio

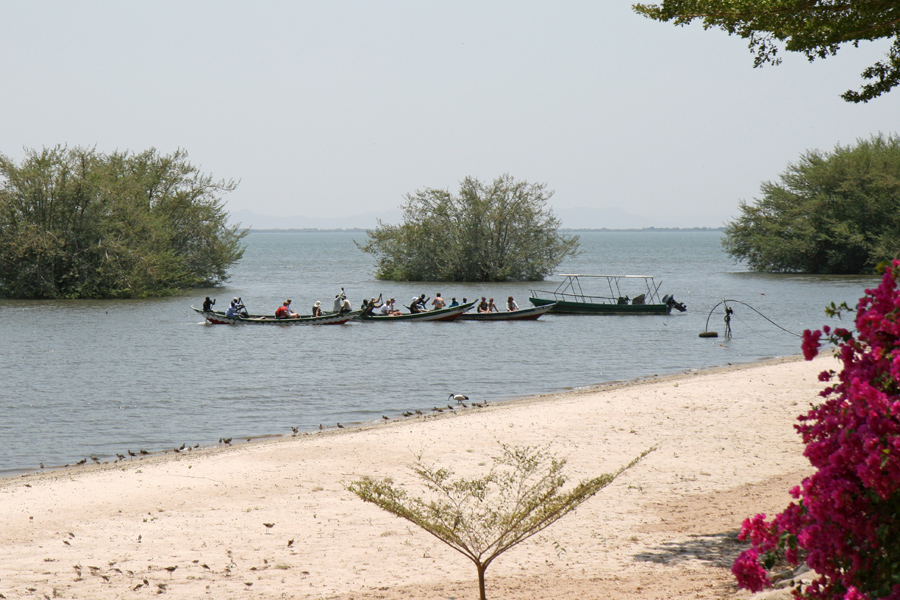
Boats in Speke Gulf

== Notable people ==
- Alex Magaga - this musician is an activist, documentary producer and member of the Tanzania Albinism Collective.
- Aniceti Kitereza (1896–1981) was a Tanzanian Catholic cleric and novelist, born in 1896 on the island of Ukerewe.
- Gertrude Mongella (13 September 1945) is a Tanzanian politician who was the first president of the Pan-African Parliament and was president of the African Union Commission from 2003 to 2008.

== See also ==
- Kerewe people
