= Fadhy Mtanga =

Tanzanian writer

Fadhili Frank Mtanga (born 14 November 1981) popularly known by his pen name Fadhy Mtanga is a Tanzanian creative writer, translator, blogger, photographer, graphic designer and social worker.

== Career ==
He published his first Swahili novel, Kizungumkuti in 2011, that was followed by Huba in 2014 and Fungate in 2017. In 2020, he published his fourth novel Rafu. In August 2020 Fadhy began what he called #TuzoChallenge on his Facebook wall. He challenged other Swahili writers to continue his new story that he titled Tuzo. As the first initiative in the world of literature, the challenge led to the publication of the very first novel of its own kind going by the same title. Featured by five authors (Fadhy Mtanga, Lilian Mbaga, Maundu Mwingizi, Laura Pettie and Hussein Tuwa), Tuzo was launched in December 2020.

He also published his first Swahili poetry book Hisia in 2018.

He has written a significant number of uncollected short stories that he shares regularly via his blogs and social network accounts. Several of his short stories have been translated into English by translator Jay Boss Rubin, and have appeared in U.S.-based literary and scholarly journals such as Living in Languages and Northwest Review. His short story "Haiba" (translated by Rubin and titled "Attitudes" in English) is included in Two Lines Press's first-of-its kind collection of Swahili Fiction, No Edges: Swahili Stories.

His narratives, featuring people from various walks of life and socioeconomic classes, reflect on and weave together relationship issues, family issues, and matters related to work, power, and authority. Through his use of staccato sentences, introduction of new vocabulary, and subtle incorporation of English words and phrases, Fadhy Mtanga's writing has contributed significantly to the development of modern Swahili.

Apart from writing, Fadhy works as an Executive Director of a Tanzanian NGO, Health & Insurance Management Services Organization (HIMSO) based in Mbeya.

== Works ==
- Kizungumkuti (2011)
- Huba (2014)
- Fungate (2017)
- Hisia (2018)
- Rafu (2020)
- Tuzo (2020) with other four Swahili authors
