= Ukerewe District =

Ukerewe Halmashauri ya Wilaya ya Ukerewe (Swahili)
- District
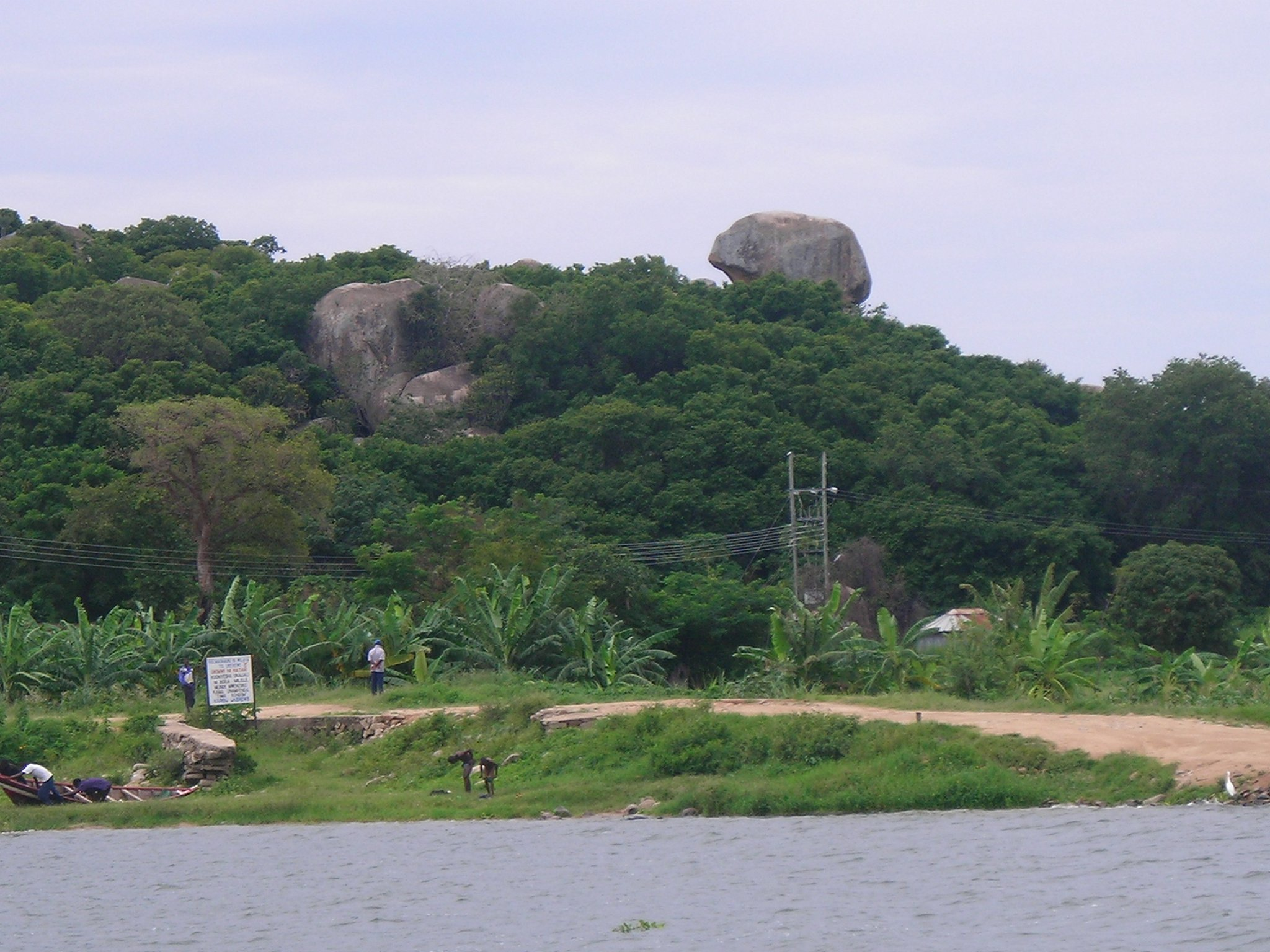
- Shores of Ukerewe Island.

- Ukerewe District of Mwanza Region
- Coordinates: 2°03′S 33°01′E
- Country: Tanzania
- Region: Mwanza Region
- District: Ukerewe District
- Boroughs: 24 wards: Bukanda; Bukiko; Bukindo; Bukongo; Bukungu; Bwiro; Bwisya; Igala; Ilangala; Irugwa; Kagera; Kagunguli; Kakerege; Mukituntu; Muriti; Murutunguru; Nakatunguru; Namagondo; Namilembe; Nansio; Nduruma; Ngoma; Nkilizya; Nyamanga

Population (2016)
  - Total: 388,778
- Postcode: 336xx
- Area code: 028
- UFI: -2574242
- Website: District Website

Ukerewe District is one of the seven districts of the Mwanza Region of Tanzania. It is located on Ukerewe Island, Ukara Island and other neighbouring islands within Lake Victoria. The largest settlement and the district's administrative capital is Nansio.

In 2016 the Tanzania National Bureau of Statistics report there were 388,778 people in the district, from 345,147 in 2012.

There are several small hotels and guest houses on the island to accommodate visitors.

The district is accessible by daily boat services between Mwanza city and Nansio. A road connecting the Island with Bunda district in Mara region via ferries on the eastern shore of Lake Victoria offers an alternative for those preferring not to travel by water.

== Administrative subdivisions ==
=== Constituencies ===
For parliamentary elections, Tanzania is divided into constituencies. As of the 2020 elections Ukerewe District had one constituency:

- Ukerewe Constituency

=== Divisions ===
Ukerewe District is administratively divided into divisions.

=== Wards ===
Ukerewe District is administratively divided into twenty-five wards:

- Bukanda
- Bukiko
- Bukindo
- Bukongo
- Bukungu
- Bwiro
- Bwisya
- Igalla
- Ilangala
- Irugwa
- Kagera
- Kagunguli
- Kakerege
- Kakuru
- Mukituntu
- Muriti
- Murutunguru
- Nakatunguru
- Namagondo
- Namilembe
- Nansio
- Nduruma
- Ngoma
- Nkilizya
- Nyamanga
