= Kerewe people =

Ethnic group from Mwanza Region of Tanzania

The Kerewe (locally: Wakerewe) are a Bantu ethnolinguistic group based on Ukerewe Island in the Tanzanian section of Lake Victoria. They speak the Kerewe language.

== Population ==
In 2012, the population of the Kerewe people was 345,147.

== Arts ==
The Kerewe of Ukerewe Island in Lake Victoria carved large wooden figures, about 3 feet (90 cm) high, which appear to have been effigies of deceased chiefs. Other examples of wood sculpture, including figures and masks, are known, some showing possible influences from the Luba of the Democratic Republic of the Congo. In general, however, this is an area in which other artistic mediums clearly dominate.

== See also ==
Kerewe language
