= Rehema Chachage =

Tanzanian artist, writer and researcher, born 1987

- Born: 1987 (age 38–39); Dar es Salaam
- Education: University of Cape Town, University of London
- Style: Visual and multimedia art
- Movement: Contemporary African art
- Website: rehemachachage.co.tz

Rehema Chachage is a contemporary multimedia artist, writer and researcher from Tanzania. She is mainly known for her non-traditional media (re-)creating African stories, rituals and oral traditions about matrilinear experiences. For this, she uses art forms such as performance, photography, video, text and physical installations related to women in the Swahili region.

== Life and career ==
Born in Dar es Salaam, Chachage comes from a family of academics and activists. She was born in Dar es Salaam to the late professor Chachage Seithy Loth Chachage and his wife Demere Kitunga as one of four children. Her father was an academic, political analyst and author. Her mother is an activist, a feminist writer, editor and publisher in Tanzania. Two of her siblings are also academics, Chambi Chachage, is a scholar of African studies at Princeton University and political analyst. Her sister Mkunde Chachage is a lecturer and researcher at University of Dar es Salaam Mbeya College of Health and Allied Sciences (UDSM – MCHAS) and also a researcher at the National Institute for Medical Research at Mbeya medical research centre (NIMR – MMRC).

In 2009, Chachage graduated with a Bachelor of Fine Arts from Michaelis School of Fine Art of the University of Cape Town, South Africa. Further, she obtained a Master of Arts in Contemporary Art Theory from Goldsmiths, University of London, in 2018. Pursuing her PhD studies and as a lecturer at the University of Applied Arts, Chachage currently lives in Vienna, Austria.

Through video art and sculptural installations, Chachage's work examines universal themes such as identity, belonging and cultural transmission in patriarchal societies. Her work has included personal experiences, such as her relation to her deceased father, feeling uprooted in a strange country, and also African rituals and traditions of motherhood and gender relations in male-dominated societies. In Chachage's video installation of 2010, Kwa Baba Rithi Undugu (English: To/From the father), objects representing antiquated transistor radios are arranged on the wall and positioned in a vertical array. In each radio there is a miniature video screen, which, when activated, displays a stationary figure while a vertical line scans across the figure in search of a suitable sound frequency. A man's voice can be heard intermittently, its transmission being periodically interrupted by extraneous noise.

In her work with museums, Chachage has collaborated with African and German artists examining Germany's colonial past and its meaning for the present both in Germany and Tanzania. Exhibiting her visual and multimedia artworks, she has participated in art shows in the U.S., South Africa, Senegal, Germany, Belgium, and Japan, among others. In 2024, she participated in an event and publication organized by Columbia University's Institute of African Studies.

From 15 February to 9 June 2025, the historical and art museums in Stade, Germany, are showing the exhibition AMANI kukita | kung'oa (planted | uprooted). This show presents shared German and Tanzanian perspectives on the historical collection by German botanist Karl Braun. It is based on provenience research going back to the work of scientists during German colonial times in the Amani research station. Chachage and fellow Tanzanian artist Valerie Asiimwe Amani, as well as artist Yvette Kießling from Germany, created artworks relating to the collection and its natural setting in Tanzania. The accompanying catalogue was co-edited by Chachage.

Apart from her artwork, Chachage has published about contemporary art in Tanzania. In her 2014 article for the cultural website Nafasi Art Space, she quoted a letter that Marina Galvani, then head curator of the World Bank art program, had written to the National Arts Council of Tanzania. Referring to artists having "a special role as social barometers, as promoters of change and as repository of tradition", Chachage discussed an emerging public interest and "cultural awakening" in the contemporary culture of Tanzania.

== Selected exhibitions ==
=== Solo exhibitions ===
- Nitakujengea kinyumba, na vikuta vya kupitia (A Home for You I will Create, with Exit Pathways – A Gut Feeling), Vienna, Austria, 2023
- Mlango wa Navushiku (Navushiku’s Lineage), Circle Art Gallery, Nairobi, 2017
- Mshanga, Nafasi Art Space, Dar es Salaam, 2013
- Orupa Mchikirwa/Mshanga, Akiyoshidai International Art Village, Yamaguchi, Japan, 2012
- Chipuza ('Germinate’), Goethe Institute Tanzania, Dar es Salaam, 2010
- Haba na Haba, Michaelis School of Fine Art, London, U.K. 2009

=== Group exhibitions ===
- AMANI kukita | kung'oa (planted | uprooted), Stade, Germany, 2025
- The Journey, Grassi Museum, Leipzig, Germany, 2022
- The Land Remembers, Ethnological Museum Hamburg, Germany, (2019)
- WomanISM, Ostrale Dresden, Germany (2019)
- That, around which the Universe Revolves, Düsseldorf, Germany, 2017
- African Spirituality, Calabar Gallery, New York, 2017
- Consuming Us, Cape Town Art Fair, South Africa, 2016
- WHERE WE’RE AT! Other Voices on Gender, Brussels, Belgium, 2014

== Awards and distinctions ==
- Lower Austria Prize for Performance, 2023
- Shortlist, Henrike Grohs Art Award, Goethe-Institute, 2020
- Pro Helvetia Art Funding Grantee, for solo exhibition at the National Gallery of Zimbabwe, Harare, 2016
- African Arts Trust Grantee, for incubation and running of Kuta-na Sanaa: Dar es Salaam, 2014
- apexart Franchise 2nd Winner, for Beauty Salons and the Beast, New York, 2014

== Reception ==
Apart from her international exhibitions and awards, Chachage participated as panelist and lecturer in workshops and also co-curated exhibitions. Further, she was invited as Artist-in-Residence by cultural organizations in Germany, Japan, Norway and The Netherlands.

In her chapter titled "An African Woman Coming to Voice Through a Multimodal Artwork" art historian Margareta Wallin Wiktorin discussed Chachage's video installation Kwa Baba Rithi Undugu of 2010 in detail. Chachage's work was originally scheduled to be exhibited at the 2012 Dak'art biennale and appeared in the corresponding catalogue, but did not arrive in time for the art show. Commenting on the work's theme of "voice and lack of voice", the reviewer interpreted this installation as "the female subaltern's ability to speak in a contemporary African context," and as a response to Gayatri Spivak's essay "Can the Subaltern Speak?" In an article for the academic journal African Arts about the discourse on the arts of Africa, Chachage was further quoted saying: "I prefer to listen closely to those voices which seem to be speaking from a place of difference and are met with indifference."

In March 2022, Oxford anthropologist Dan Hicks reported about an art installation in Leipzig's ethnological Grassi Museum. In this collaboration between Tanzanian artists Rehema Chachage and Valerie Asiimwe Amani and the Germany-based PARA collective, the artists replaced museum's original display of its former director Karl Weule with an art installation that revisited dispossession and colonial memory through decolonial perspectives.
