= Chachage =

Chachage is a surname. Notable people with the surname include:

- Mkunde Chachage (born 1984), Tanzanian immunologist
- Rehema Chachage, Tanzanian artist
