= Carl Vincenti =

German photographer (1871–1940)

- Born: 1871
- Died: 1940 (aged 68–69); Munich, Germany
- Occupations: Photographer and publisher
- Years active: 1894 – ca. 1915
- Known for: Portrait and documentary photography in German East Africa
- Awards: 1905 Silver medal, Louisiana Purchase Exposition, St. Louis, United States

Carl Vincenti was a German photographer, publisher and owner of a photographic studio, active in Dar es Salaam during the colonial era of German East Africa in modern-day Tanzania. His photographs, approximately taken between 1894 and 1915, encompass a wide range of subjects, including portraits of Germans and Africans, colonial architecture, urban views and landscapes that document aspects of everyday life and nature in the former German colony.

== Life and work ==
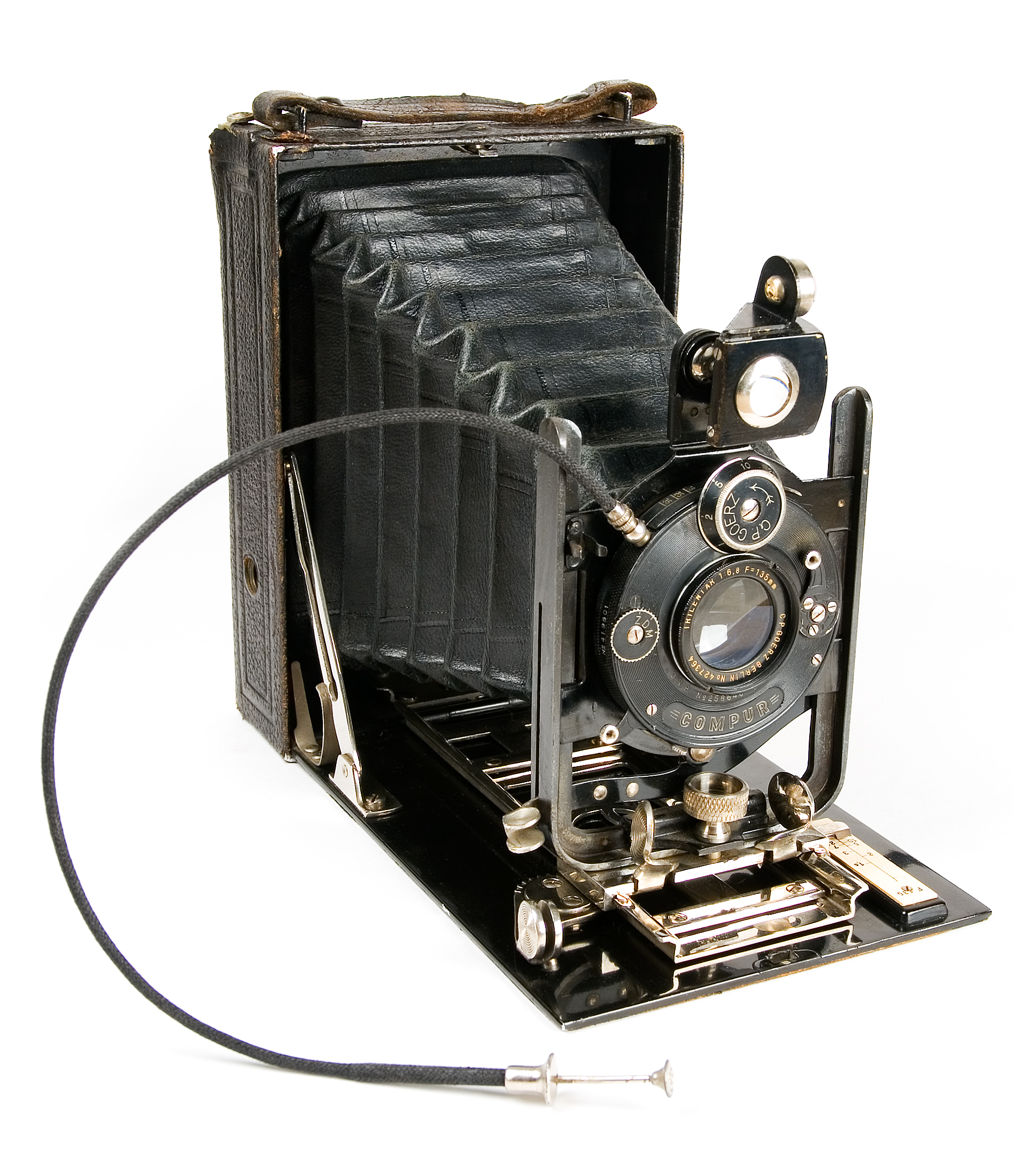
Goerz folding camera, early 1900s

Vincenti grew up in Miesbach, a small town in the former Kingdom of Bavaria. Information about his youth, his journey to German East Africa and his training as a photographer is not documented. By 1894, Vincenti was active in Dar es Salaam as photographer and publisher at his "Photographic Institute and Trading Company of Photographic Articles." After 1903, the German photographer Walther Dobbertin worked at Vincenti's photo studio in Dar es Salaam for some time. When Dobbertin had stolen photographic material, however, Vincenti took him to court. After having been sentenced in 1907, Dobbertin started his own studio and publishing business.

Vincenti also produced picture postcards through his "Kunstverlag C. Vincenti, Dar es Salaam" (lit. art publisher), stressing the artistic character of his images. As a commercial publisher, he sold both individual prints as well as picture postcards, some of which were stamped with his company mark and the year of the photograph.

Due to his experience as a resident photographer, Vincenti was able to provide advice to photographers who were temporarily staying in the colony. For instance, the paleontologists Werner Janensch and Edwin Hennig, who documented their excavations of dinosaur fossils in Tendaguru not only in writing, but also with photographs, corresponded with Vincenti about technical problems in 1909 and 1910. Further, the colonial officer Oskar Bongart reported in his notes on photographic documentation in the tropics that he only managed to achieve successful photographs using a Goerz-Anschütz folding camera lent to him by Vincenti. In addition, Vincenti's photographs were published in scientific publications. The botanist Walter Busse, for example, described plants and agriculture in German East Africa, using Vincenti's images.

Apart from his activities as a businessman, Vincenti also was a member of the Government Council. In 1896, the German authorities housed Khalid ibn Barghash, the exiled Sultan of Zanzibar, in Vincenti's home, where he subsequently lived. During World War I, Vincenti was a member of the city committee in Dar es Salaam. In this capacity, he continued to correspond with the Reich Colonial Office in Berlin and the British District Political Officer about the repatriation of German citizens after the German defeat and the end of the German colony.

== Photographic works ==
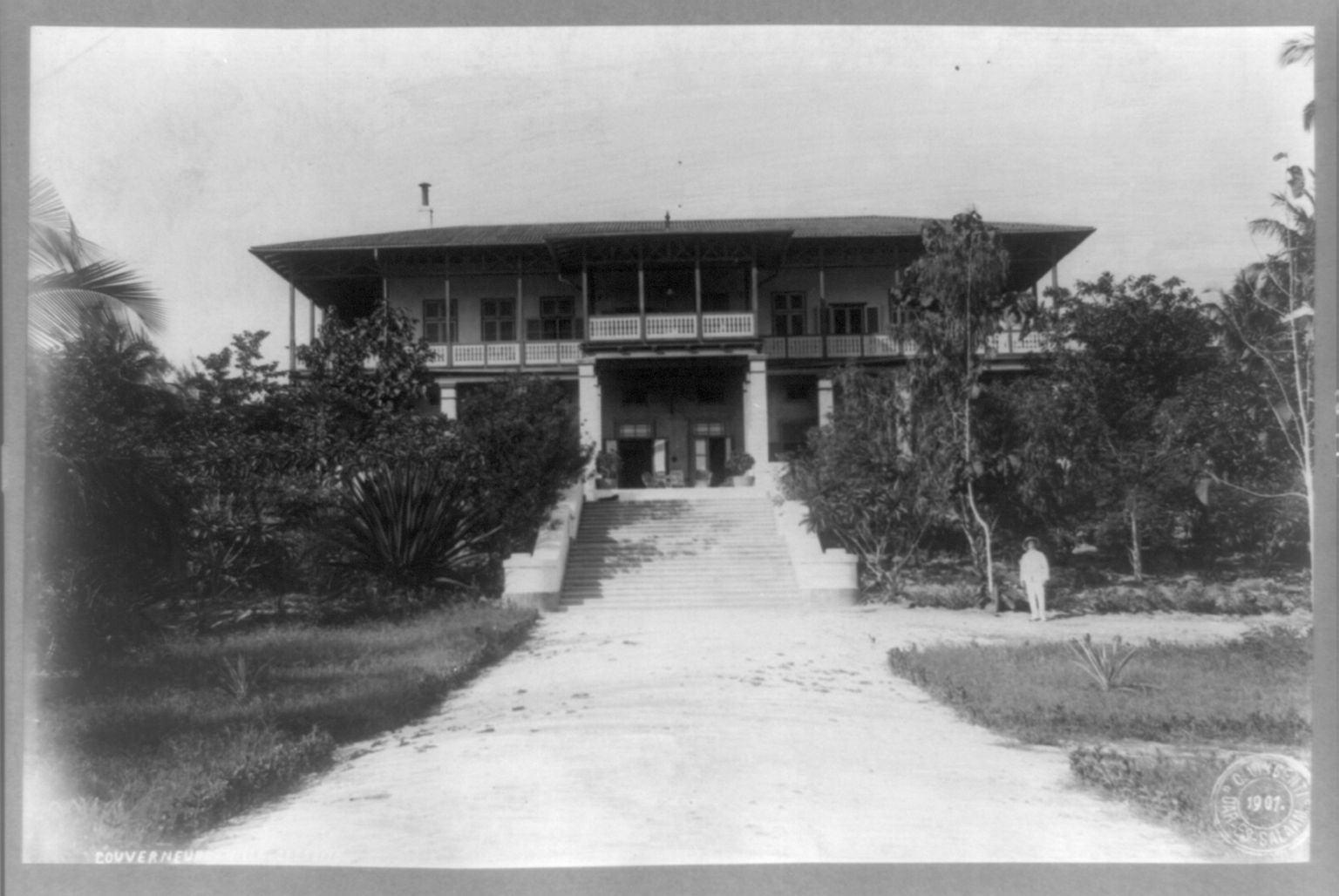
Residence of the German Gouvernor in Dar es Salam

Vincenti's historical photographs, found in European and American collections, provide insights into the history, population, culture, and natural environment of the German colony. His images capture scenes of daily life, such as markets, villages, and traditional ceremonies, members of the German colonial society, and Africans from various ethnic groups. Additionally, there are photographs of colonial buildings, landscapes, animals, and the natural scenery from 1894 to around 1907. His photographs were taken both in his studio as well as outdoors and were partially also published in works about German East Africa until 1919.

The proceedings of the 1905 German Colonial Congress in Berlin commented on Vincenti's photographs as follows: "These very beautiful pictures of stately format depict views of vegetation, scenic landscapes and types of people from our East African colony."

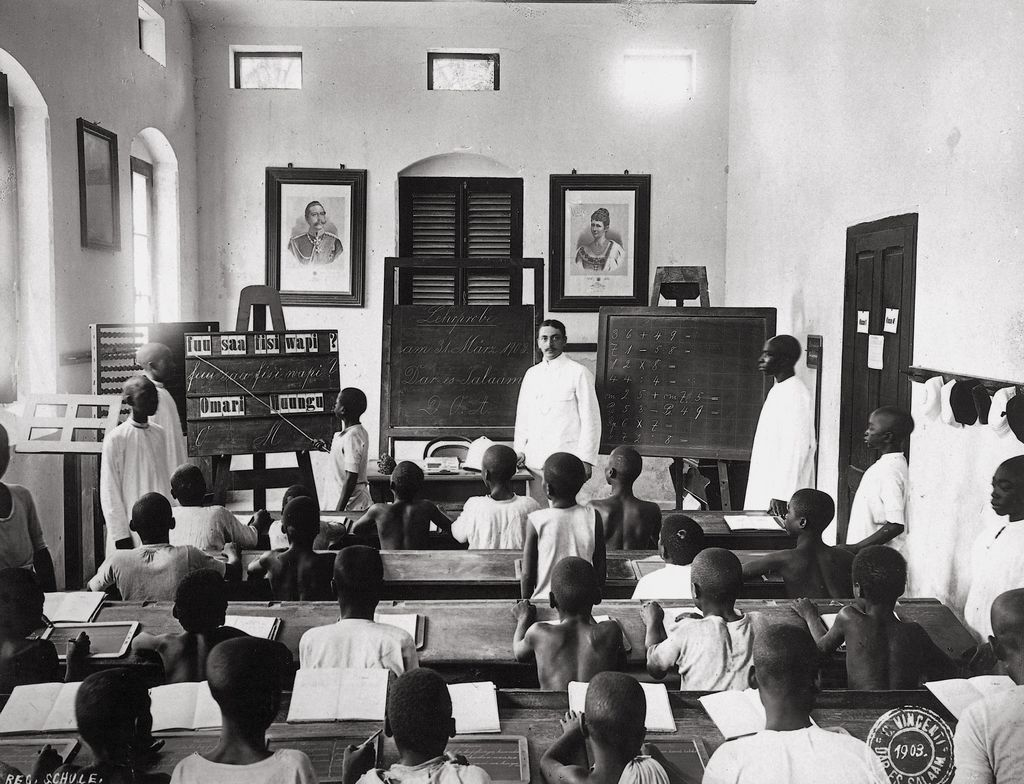
Government school with German teacher and African pupils, 1903

=== Pictures of colonial life ===
Vincenti's photographs of colonial life in Dar es Salaam include images of the harbour, streets, official and residential buildings. Others show African troops with German officers in white uniforms, a military parade on the Kaiser's birthday, a roll call of the Askari local soldiers and a colonial officer in the field sitting on a folding chair in front of his tent, with a native servant standing by. Vincenti's postcard of the New Boma military station in Tabora was sent by the colonial postage service with a postage stamp of 7 1/2 Heller in 1910.

A photograph from a government school in 1903 depicts a German teacher and local pupils in a classroom, with blackboards for arithmetic instruction as well as reading and writing lessons in Swahili language, using Latin script that the Germans had introduced.

=== Pictures of indigenous people ===
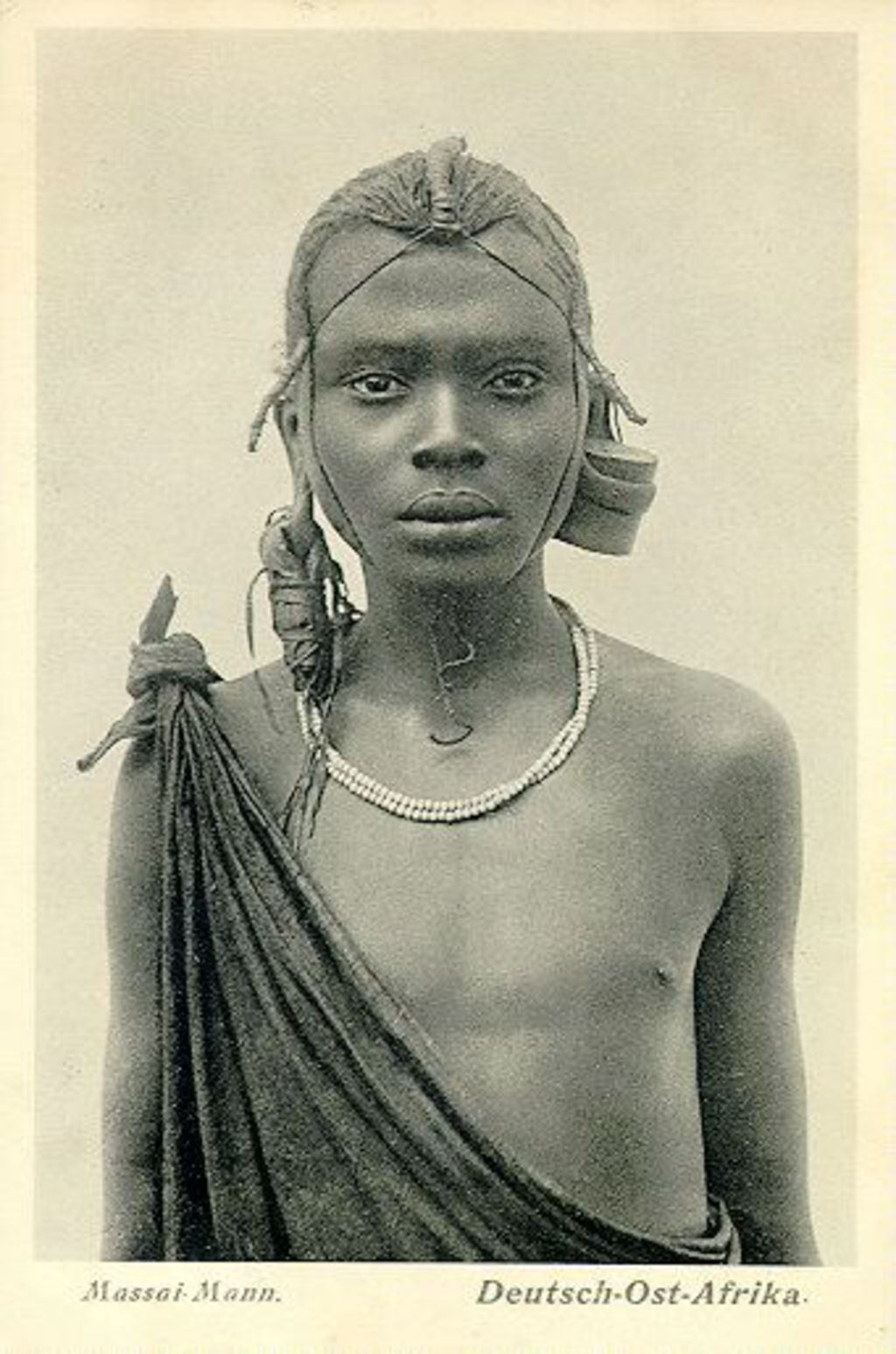
Picture postcard of a young Maasai man, ca. 1900

The existing photographs of Vincenti include numerous images of indigenous people and their everyday life under colonial rule. These depict representatives of ethnic groups such as the Nyamwezi, Here, Yao, Gogo, Maasai, Swahili, as well as Indian merchants, as well as so-called Arabs, a group resulting from the unions of Arab immigrants with African women. Among the portraits are staged studio photographs with a painted backdrop, including a full view of a young woman of the Yao people.

Another portrait shows a three-quarter view of a Swahili youngster next to a young woman. The young man wears the Islamic headdress kofia and a kanzu shirt; the woman a turban and a kanga wrapped dress, as well as necklaces, earrings and bracelets. The half-portrait of Wali Mohamed bin Salim, a dignitary from Mikindani, shows the sitter with typical garments of his Arab descent and the curved dagger jambia. Pictured in a studio portrait for a postcard around 1900, a young man of the Maasai ethnic group with typical hairstyle looked straight at the camera.

An outdoor photograph shows a grown man and a woman with a boy, labelled "Family (native)". They are wearing kangas and sitting in front of a tent, facing the camera. Other pictures show locals dancing a ngoma dance or playing an African board game. Further, Vincenti also documented scenes at the Tanga railway station and of African workers building railway tracks, at an expedition camp or as porters of a caravan with elephant tusks. These bear witness to the working conditions under colonial rule in German East Africa.

== Awards ==
In 1905 Vincenti was awarded a silver medal at the Louisiana Purchase Exposition in St. Louis, United States.

== Gallery ==
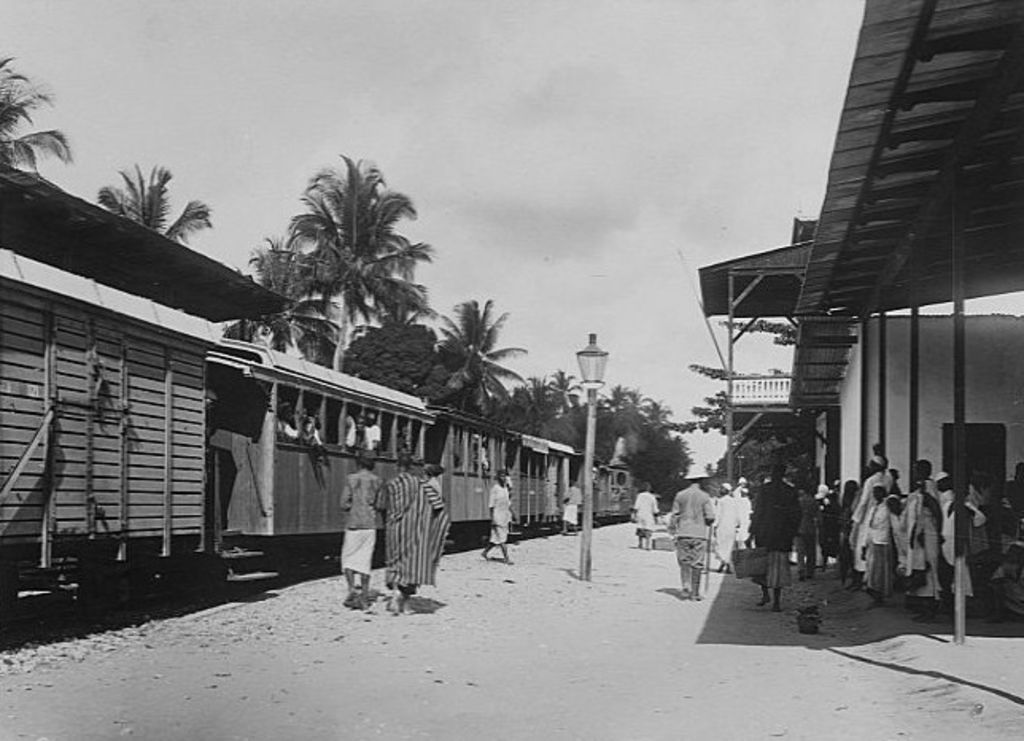
Outdoor picture of the railway station in Tanga

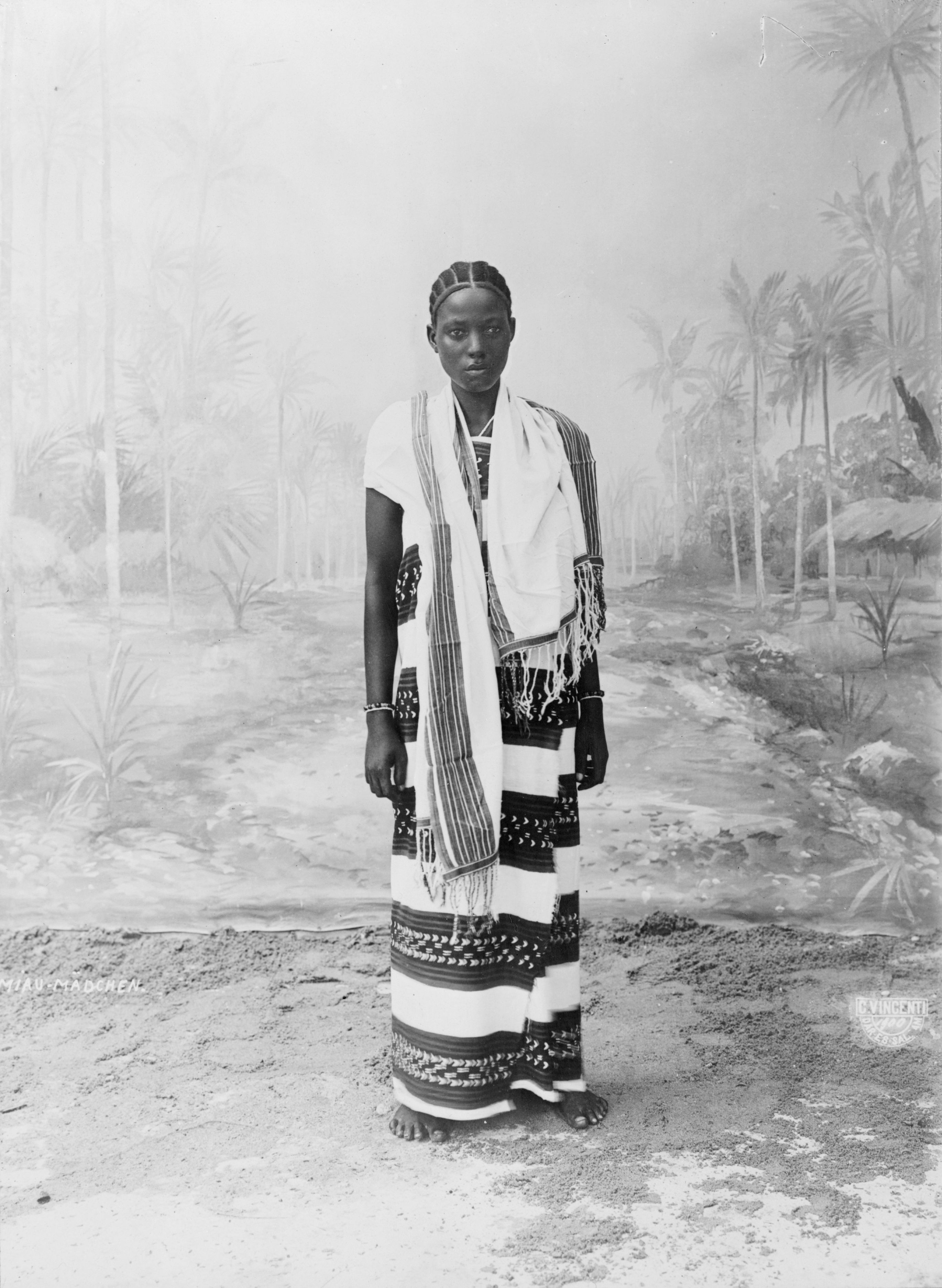
Studio portrait of a young Wao woman

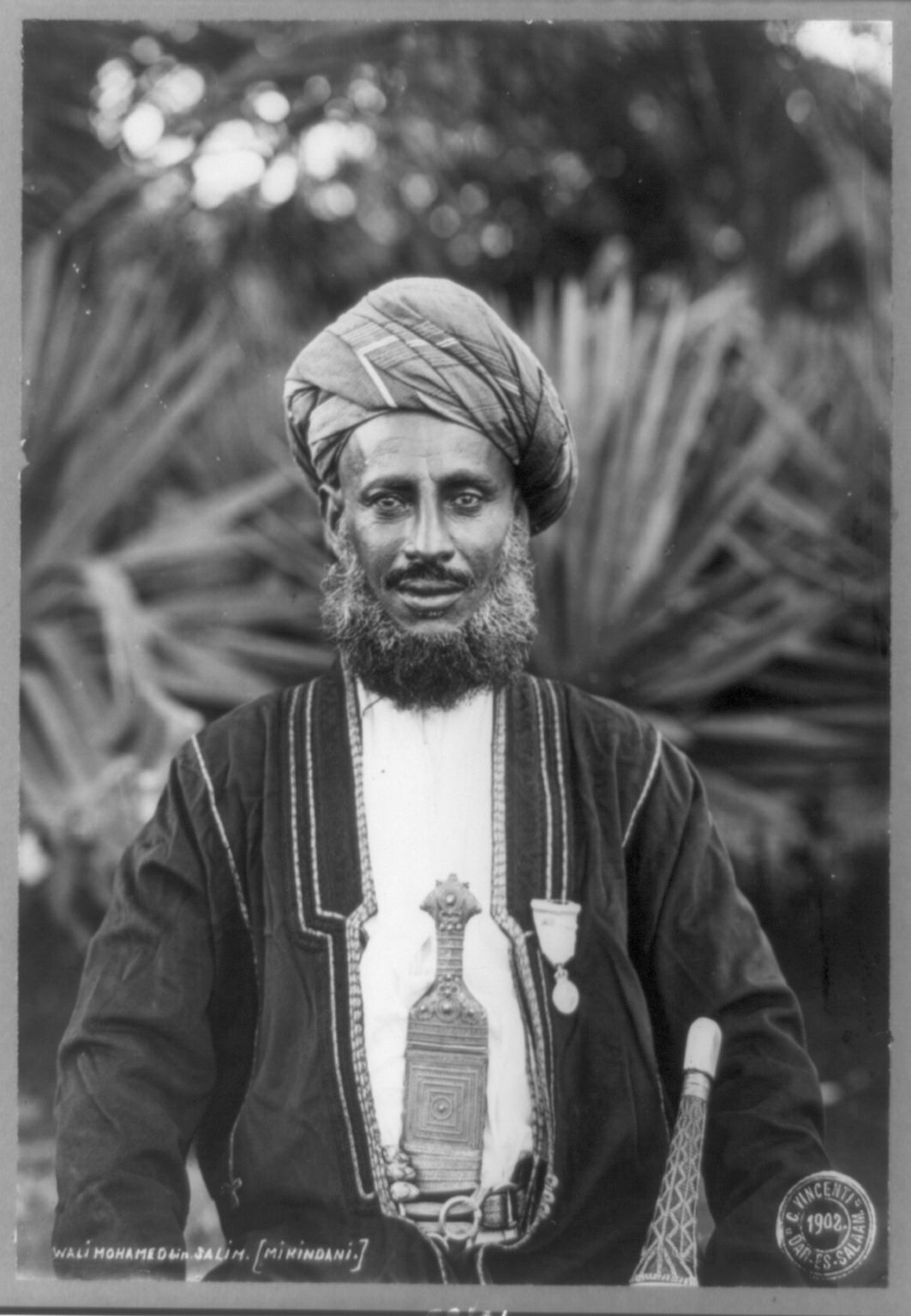
Portrait of Wali Mohamed bin Salim, 1902

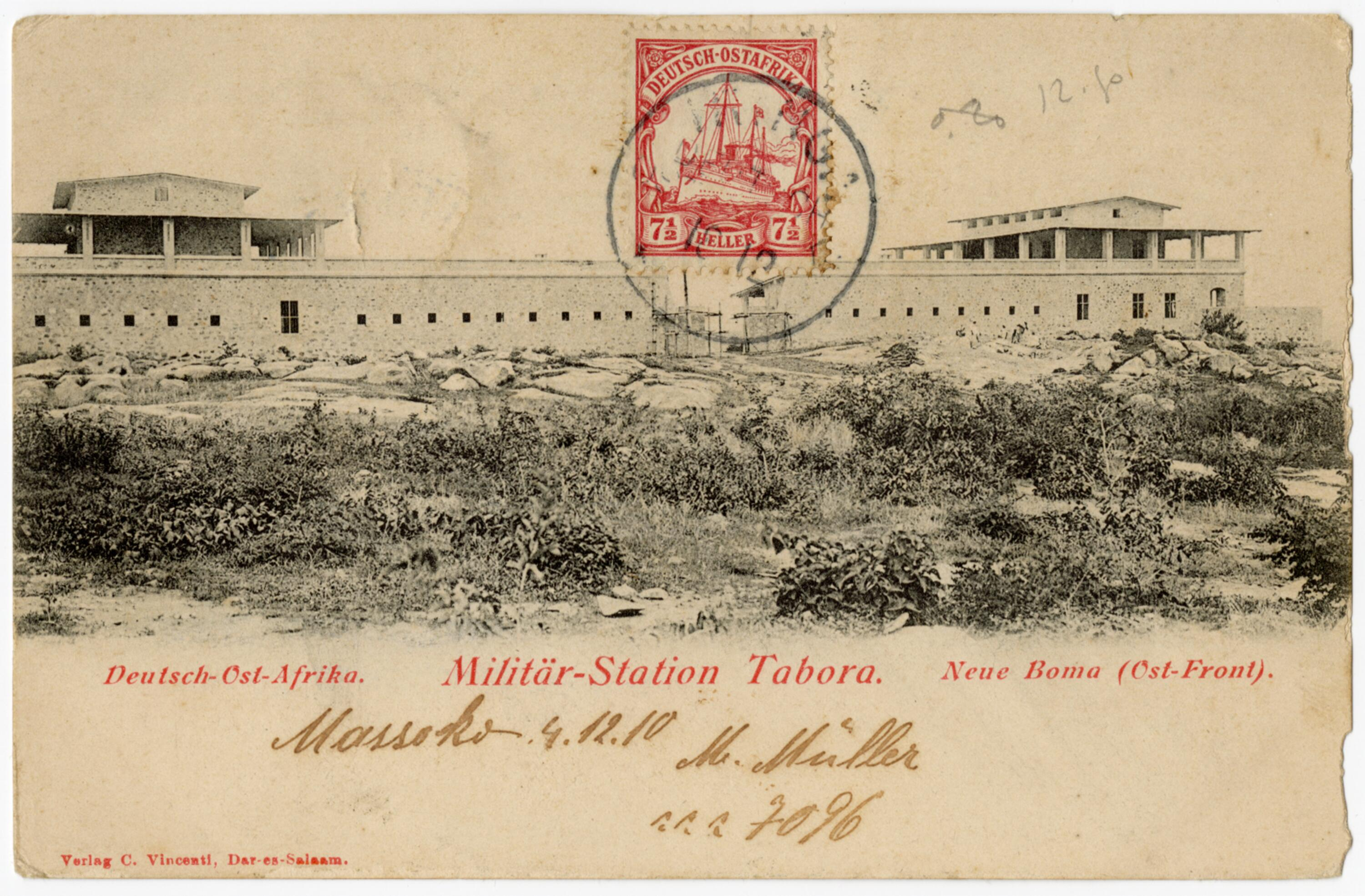
Postcard of German military station at Tabora, 1910

== Reception ==
=== Photographs as visual documents ===
Like other historical images and texts, photographs from colonial Africa serve as documents for research into the history of the country and its inhabitants. In academic scholarship, disciplines such as visual anthropology, visual culture, as well as the history of photography and the production of images are concerned with such photographs. As cultural anthropologist Christraud M. Geary pointed out, their meanings are multiple and can be interpreted in open-ended ways. As historical documents, they bear witness to colonial rule, the domination of native people, the extraction of natural resources and the work of missionaries to spread Christian faith.

Starting at the end of the 19th century, photography and picture postcards became increasingly popular with visitors and residents of European colonies in Africa and elsewhere. Through improving and relatively cheap postal services, they created new forms of communication and served political interests. Then and now, these images have shaped the public vision of important historical changes in the lives of Africans. In order to sell their pictures, studios produced staged images of Africans with traditional clothing and ornaments, reinforcing biased views of Africa. In the context of postcolonial studies and critical whiteness studies, such representations have been labelled with the term "colonial gaze".

Thus, a modern website of the German Historical Museum about German East Africa includes Vincenti's photograph of a colonial classroom with blackboards for lessons and wall pictures of the German emperor Wilhelm II and his wife as a visual document for life in the colony. At the top of the same website is another historical picture showing the German photographer Otto Haeckel during his trip in German East Africa with a bellows camera on a tripod in front of a native hut. As another example, a research project on the colonial collection of the botanist Karl Braun published Vincenti's panoramic image of the Amani research station in the Usambara Mountains in 2024.

A study of racial stereotyping with reference to the territory of the modern state of Rwanda, that at the time belonged to German East Africa, discussed a picture postcard published by Vincenti among other colonial photographs. Vincenti's picture shows two African men in traditional dress, labelled "Watussi Sultans. German East Africa". The author opined that the photographs shown in her study "are almost continuously racist, discriminatory and violate the personality of the depicted." Further, the study assumes that Vincenti as publisher was interested in selling stereotypical images of members of the Rwandan kingdom. In her analysis of this photograph, the author concludes: "The results of Vincenti's work thus appear without the viewer being able to gather historical colonial or political facts about the background of his imagery."

In her study of concepts of racial and social hierarchies in colonial German postcards and photographs, Anastasia Banshchikova from the Institute for African Studies, Moscow National Research University, discussed photographs by Vincenti, Dobbertin and other colonial photographers. Interpreting such photographs, she ascertained that they provided visual evidence for the social division of German colonial, intermediate (Askaris, Indian, Swahili) and native African populations.

=== Vincenti's photographs in collections ===
In Germany, photographs and postcards by Vincenti can be found in the collections of the German Historical Museum, the Museum of Postal Services and Telecommunication, the Goethe University Frankfurt and the Ethnological Museum in Berlin. In addition to individual positive prints in black and white, the museum in Berlin also holds a photo album entitled "Original photographs from German East Africa; Dar-es-Saalam [sic] from the years 1901-1902" with gelatin silver prints on cardboard with Vincenti's company logo and the note "Vervielfältigung vorbehalten" (reproduction reserved).

The Ethnographic Museum in Budapest owns a series of Vincenti's photographs of the construction and operation of a Catholic mission station of the Benedictine Congregation of St Ottilien in Kurasini, south of Dar es Salaam, in the years 1894-1895. These are labelled "Original photograph and publisher by C. Vincenti, Dar es Salaam. East Africa" and were also distributed by Vincenti as picture postcards. In the United States, there is an extensive collection of more than 300 of Vincenti's photographs in the Beinecke Rare Book and Manuscript Library at Yale University and a smaller one in the Frank and Frances Carpenter Collection at the Library of Congress in Washington, D.C. In the United Kingdom, Cambridge University Library holds a collection of monochrome postcards of scenes in German East Africa by Walther Dobbertin and Carl Vicenti.

Private collectors also own historical photos by Vincenti. For example, the auction house Sotheby's auctioned a photo album on Zanzibar and Dar es Salaam, in which 32 photos bear Vincenti's round company stamp. Furthermore, the art agency Artnet sold a collection of 58 original Vincenti photographs from German East Africa in 2014.
