= Walther Dobbertin =

German photographer, publisher and author (1882–1961)

- Born: 28 August 1882; Berlin, Province of Brandenburg, Kingdom of Prussia, German Empire
- Died: 12 January 1961 (aged 78); Jesteburg, Lower Saxony, West Germany
- Citizenship: German
- Occupations: Photographer and publisher
- Years active: 1903 – ca. 1932
- Known for: Documentary photography in German East Africa

Walther Alexander Dobbertin (28 August 1882 – 12 January 1961) was a German photographer and publisher, mainly active in the former colony of German East Africa, in modern-day Tanzania. His photographic work, consisting of hundreds of images in black-and-white, provides a comprehensive portrayal of the colony's political, social, economic, and military aspects. His subjects ranged from landscapes and wildlife to portraits of indigenous people and German settlers. Notably, he documented the activities of the German Schutztruppe and the experiences of Askari soldiers.

Dobbertin is the only known photographer on the German side who documented the events before and during the fighting between German and British troops in the East African campaign of World War I. His images have been considered important resources for the history of East Africa and its documentation through photography.

Following his release as a prisoner of war, Dobbertin returned to Germany and ran a bookshop in a town south of Hamburg. In 1932, he self-published a photo book with glorifying portraits of German colonial soldiers. Further, he became a member of the Nazi Party's paramilitary wing — the SA. In 1945, his business licence was revoked by the British authorities in Germany. When his licence was restored, he continued his bookshop until shortly before his death.

In 21st-century post-colonial studies, scholars have emphasised that Dobbertin's photographs function not only as historical documentation but also as artefacts allowing new interpretations of the visual culture of German colonialism—framed for administrative and commercial audiences, shaped by colonial hierarchies, and later repurposed for inter-war and nationalist German contexts.

== Life and career ==
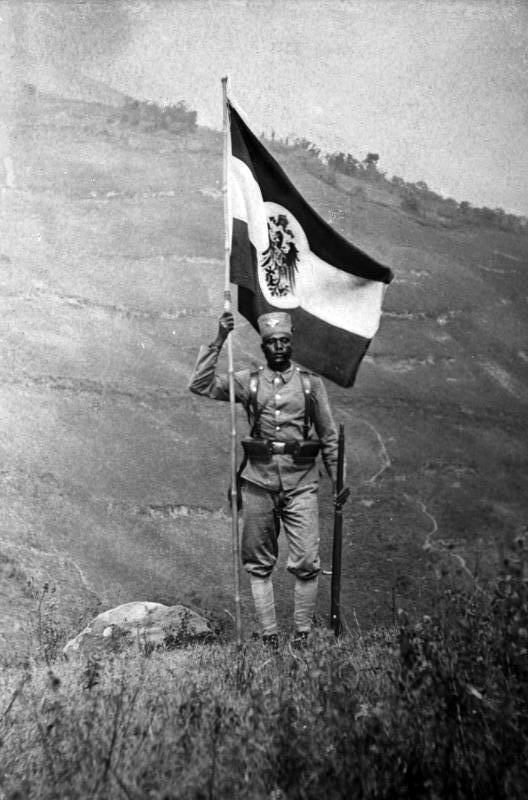
A Schutztruppe Askari flag carrier, German East Africa, 1906

=== Early life and career in German East Africa ===
Dobbertin was born on 28 August 1882 into a family of craftsmen in Berlin, the capital of the recently united German Reich. His ancestors came from Mecklenburg, where Dobbertin Abbey was located. He completed an apprenticeship as a photographer in Rostock and attended painting courses. In 1903, Dobbertin emigrated to German East Africa. After his arrival, he worked at Carl Vincenti's photo studio in Dar es Salaam, but some time later, Vincenti took Dobbertin to court, accusing him of having stolen photographic material.

In 1906, Dobbertin opened his own studio in Dar es Salaam and subsequently operated shops selling books, photographic and artistic material in Tanga and Moshi, where he also had a photographic studio. In 1910, he published his images of African life and scenery in his own "art edition" in Dar es Salaam. During the following years, Dobbertin became one of the most active photographers in German East Africa, producing hundreds of photographs and picture postcards. After the outbreak of World War I in 1914, Dobbertin was enlisted into the colonial army, the so-called Schutztruppe. Until 1916, he continued to take photographs and also shot scenes for a documentary film that has been lost. Among other aspects, he expressed the stereotypical notion of the trustful relationship between German superiors and "the brave Askari soldiers". Based on his photographs of the war, Dobbertin is considered the only photographer on the German side who documented the events during the East African campaign of World War I.

=== Later life in Germany ===
In 1916, Dobbertin was taken as a prisoner of war by British forces as a member of the German army. At the end of the war, the Germans were expelled from East Africa and expropriated. Nevertheless, Dobbertin's wife Alwine managed to smuggle her husband's photographic plates out of the country. After his release from captivity, Dobbertin returned to Germany and moved to Wiedenhof, a neighbourhood of modern-day Jesteburg, south of Hamburg, where again he opened a bookshop.

In 1932, Dobbertin self-published his book Lettow-Vorbeck's Soldiers that included 120 copperplate engravings of his photographs from World War I in East Africa. The book included glorifying portraits of the force commander in the German East Africa campaign, Paul von Lettow-Vorbeck, and other soldiers during the colonial era. Further, his photographs of East Africa were used as illustrations for a 1933 historical novel by the German writer Alfred Funke.

In Nazi Germany, Dobbertin was a member of the SA and district leader of the Reich Colonial Association. Because of these affiliations, his business licence was revoked in 1945 after World War II by the British authorities. After his licence was restored, he continued to work in his bookshop until 1960. Dobbertin died on 12 January 1961, shortly before a planned trip to Africa. Some time after his death, his widow sold his personal documents, photographic plates and photographs to the German Federal Archives.

== Photographic work ==
Dobbertin's photographs of colonial life in German East Africa amount to hundreds of images of political, social, economic and military events, also including photographs of large game hunting and wildlife, natural scenery and the construction of railways. His photographs of Africans depict indigenous people and their everyday life under colonial rule. These include images of Askari soldiers of the German Schutztruppe as well as staged "exotic" pictures of African women amongst some neutral documentation. Other images show life in villages, including children on the banks of a river, launching dugout canoes, and fishing.

== Publications ==
Own publications and illustrations for others

- Landschaftsbilder aus Deutsch-Ost-Afrika. Dar es Salaam: Kunstverlag Walther Dobbertin, 1910. OCLC number 838068870.
- Bilder aus dem Negerleben. Dar es Salaam: Kunstverlag Walther Dobbertin, 1910. OCLC number 838068839.
- Von deutscher Arbeit in Deutsch-Ostafrika, Harburg, 1920.
- Lettow-Vorbeck's Soldiers. A Book of German Fighting Spirit and Military Honor. Battery Press, Rockford, Ill., Nashville, 2005, ISBN 9780898393408. (German original: Die Soldaten Lettow-Vorbecks, published by Walther Dobbertin in 1932. Reprint 2019.)
- Alfred Funke, Schwarz-Weiß-Rot über Ostafrika. Novel. With 126 photographs by Walther Dobbertin, Hanover 1933. (in German)

== Gallery ==
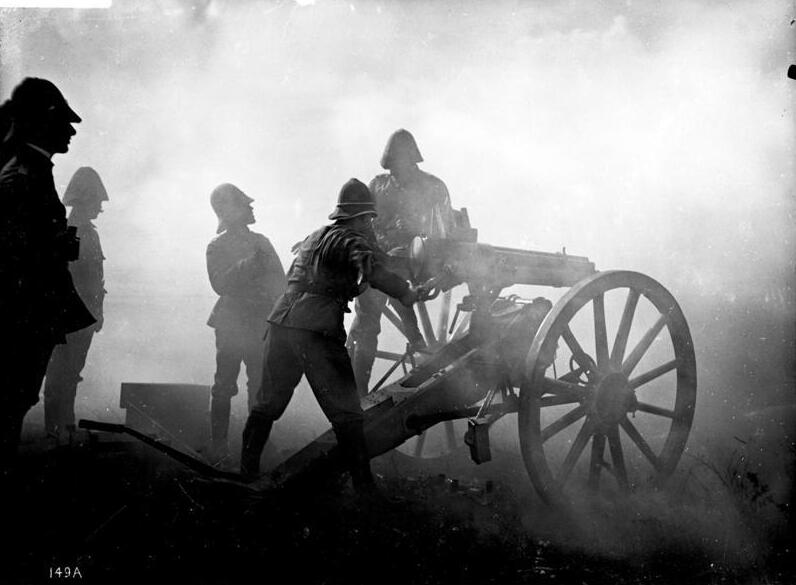
Schutztruppe soldiers with a Gatling gun in action

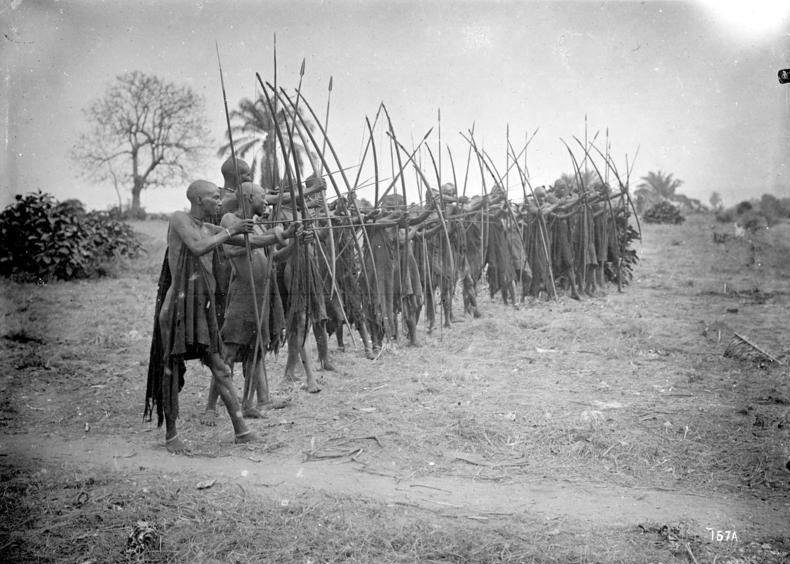
Archers in Ruanda-Urundi

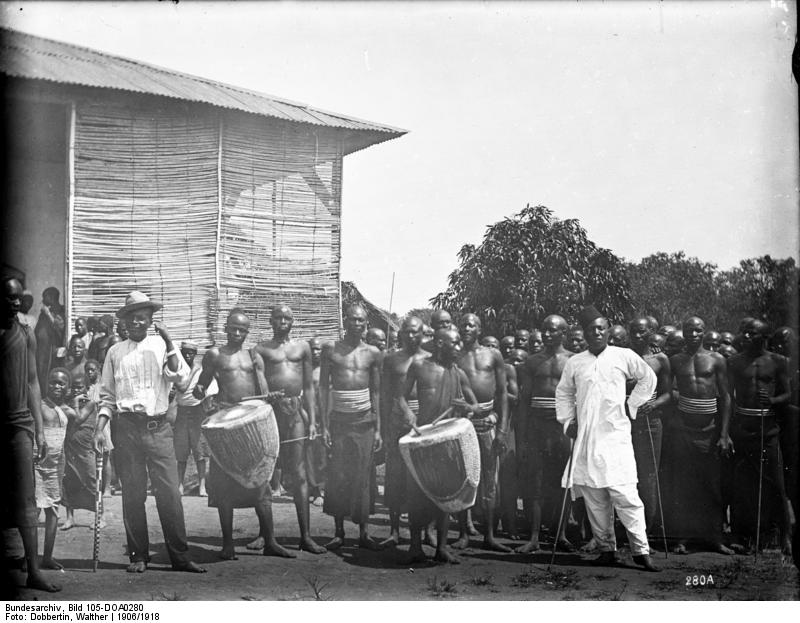
African drummers and crowd

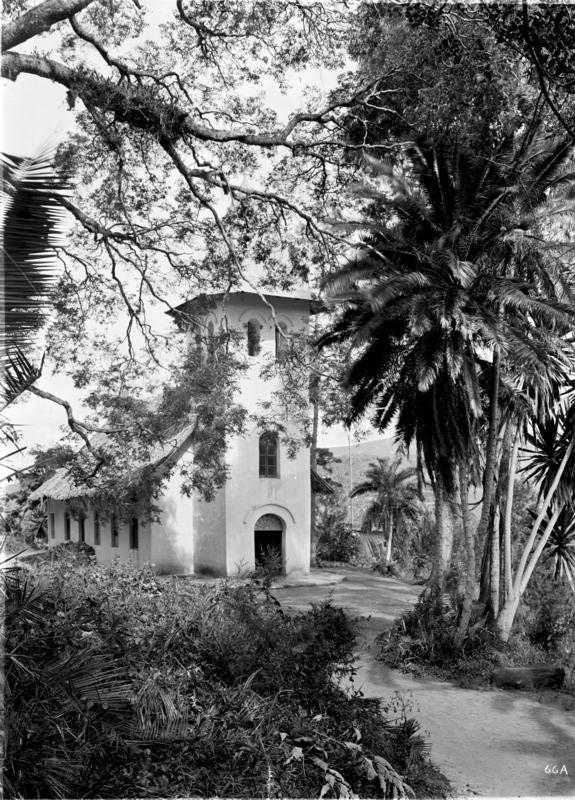
Church of the mission station Mlalo, Usambara Mountains

== Reception ==
=== Photographs as visual documents for historical studies ===
In addition to written sources and artists' impressions, photographs from colonial Africa serve as documents for research into the history of the country and its inhabitants. In academic scholarship, disciplines such as visual anthropology, visual culture, as well as the history of photography are concerned with such photographs. As cultural anthropologist Christraud M. Geary has pointed out, their meanings are multiple and can be interpreted in open-ended ways. As historical documents, they bear witness to colonial rule, the domination of native people, and the extraction of natural resources.

Starting at the end of the 19th century, photography and picture postcards became increasingly popular with visitors and residents of European colonies in Africa and elsewhere. Thanks to improved printing and relatively cheap postal services, these created new forms of communication and served commercial and political interests. Then and now, these images have shaped the public vision of important historical changes in the lives of Africans.

Compared to the documentary photographs taken by colonial officers and scientists, less authentic images of Africa and its peoples were often created by commercial photographers, who catered to the rapidly expanding European market for photographs and postcards from Africa. Commercial photo studios such as Dobbertin's produced appealing and sales-promoting photographs by carefully staging the sitters in certain poses and often with "typical" clothing and jewellery. Their manipulated portraits thus contributed to the stereotyping of Africa and Africans. In the context of postcolonial studies and critical whiteness studies, such representations have been labelled with the term "colonial gaze".

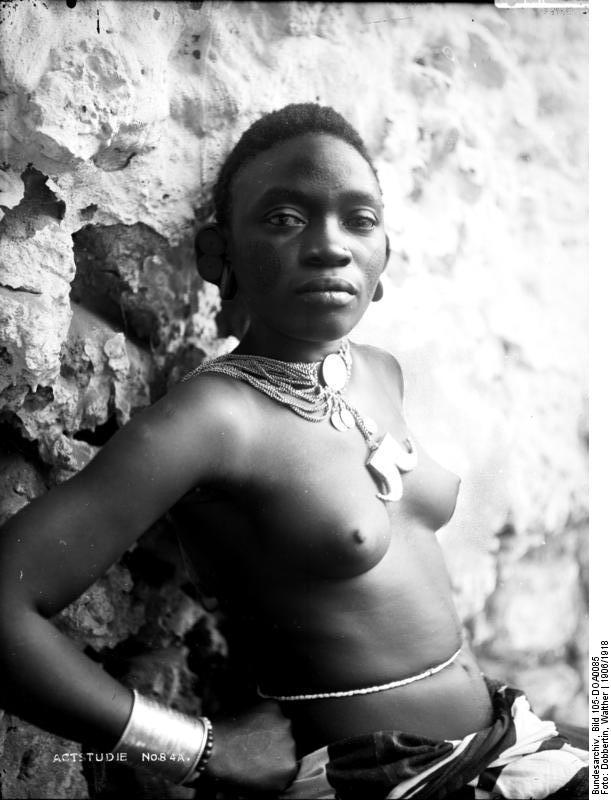
A young African woman

=== Colonial and political context ===
Recent curatorial projects and Tanzanian scholarship have examined the images’ continuing role in post-colonial memory and museum practice. Thus, in her study of African women as depicted in historical photographs from the Swahili coast, African art historian Prita Meier discussed Dobbertin's 1906 picture of an "Indigenous woman with jewelry, settler and boy" as a staged example for "the privileges enjoyed by white men in Africa." Dobbertin's surviving photographs also include portraits and images of partially nude African women. According to Christraud M. Geary such images are examples for the "racial classifications and debasing stereotypes" of Africans by colonial photographers.

In news media, books and studies about German East Africa, Dobbertin's photographs have been used as historical documents. For example, German news media such as Der Spiegel and Deutsche Welle published Dobbertin's images to document military training, forced labour and other atrocities committed by German and other European colonial powers in World War I. These images served as visual documents for these "largely forgotten victims".

Dobbertin's photography is closely linked to the visual culture of German colonial rule in East Africa. Scholars have shown that his images, produced for both administrative and commercial audiences, reflected and reinforced colonial hierarchies through selective framing, staged scenes, and depictions of settler infrastructure and African labour. His wartime photographs – notably his sequence of images relating to the Schutztruppe and Askari soldiers – have been used both as documentary sources for the East African campaign of World War I and, at times, as material for nationalist celebration. Dobbertin himself self-published a photo book of the campaign in 1932 (German: Die Soldaten Lettow-Vorbecks), a book whose design and captions have been read as commemorative and glorifying German colonial rule. This book and the reuse of its images demonstrate how visual material from the colonial era have been framed for different political ends in interwar and Nazi Germany.

=== Dobbertin's photographs in historical studies and re-interpretations ===
In 2014–15, a research team from Utah State University used thirty-two of Dobbertin's early 20th-century photographs from the Usambara Mountains as a starting point for community discussions and historical inquiry. The researchers included oral history sessions and compared past and newly taken photographs of the same locations to explore changes in the region's environment and culture. Another study by the same author discussed Dobbertin's landscape photographs of the Evangelical Lutheran mission station Mlalo Kaya along with a Trappist monastery and a settler farm. This instance of photo-elicitation provided information about colonial changes of the natural environment and the long-lasting ecological consequences.

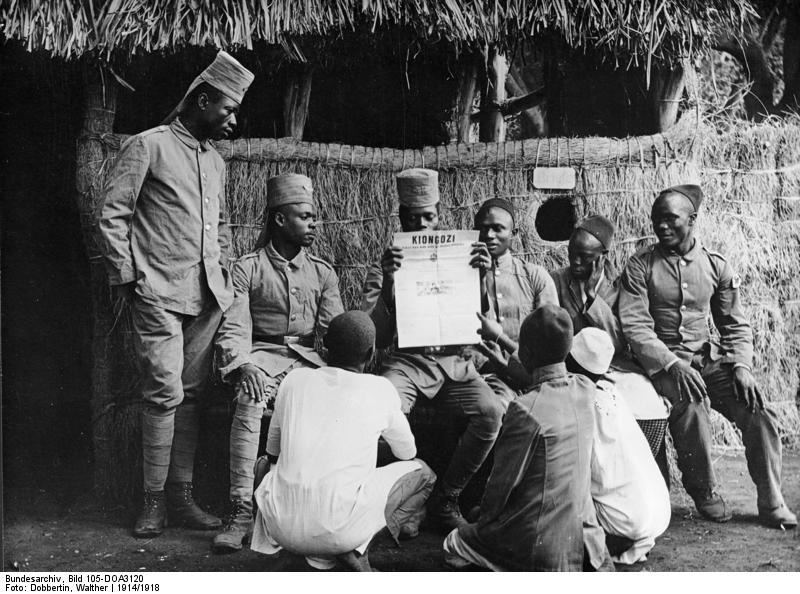
An Askari reading the colonial newspaper Kiongozi to his comrades

A 2021 scholarly article about the role of the German-run Swahili newspaper Kiongozi used a photograph by Dobbertin as evidence for how the colonial state employed this publication to spread information from the German colonizers to their indigenous subordinates.

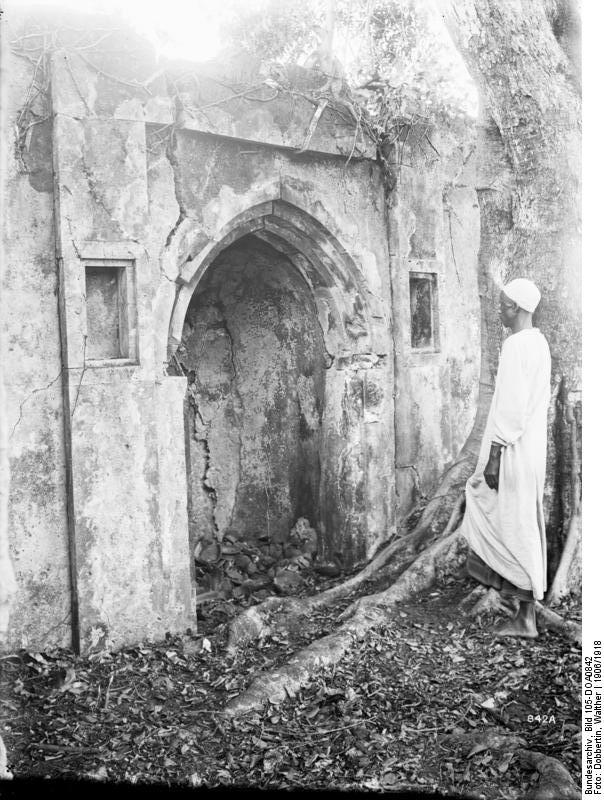
A Muslim at a mosque in ruins

In an article published in 2022 by the Institute for African Studies of the Russian Academy of Sciences, historian Anastasia A. Banshchikova analyzed the depiction of people, military stations, monuments, and European-style streets both in anonymous picture postcards and in Dobbertin's photographs of Bagamoyo, the German colony's first capital. The author noted that African Muslims and Islamic buildings, such as mosques, were only rarely depicted on colonial postcards that rather represented German colonial achievements and infrastructure. In contrast, Dobbertin's photographs also include local Muslim culture, such as a mosques and Muslims in kanzu and kofia.

Contemporary German and Tanzanian scholars and curators have also investigated how Dobbertin's pictures have been appropriated and reinterpreted in post-colonial memory and museum displays – a process that highlights both the research value of the images and the ethical issues raised by their colonial provenance and the racialised language of some original captions. In her 2023 book about the (re-)appropriation of historical photographs in contemporary Tanzania, German historian Eliane Kurmann reported that she found Dobbertin's photographs and postcards of landscapes and people, the colonial infrastructure and World War I in museums and memorial sites throughout Tanzania. They are exhibited to provide a contemporary insight into the German colonial era and illustrate school and history books, as well as websites. As Kurmann noted, Charles Kayoka, a Tanzanian media scientist and photographer, has been engaged in a so-called re-picturing project to illustrate the changes in the places photographed by Dobbertin by photographing the same scenes and motifs 100 years later and juxtaposing these historical and contemporary images with each other. In 2014, Kayoka's work was exhibited at the German cultural centre Goethe-Institute in Dar es Salaam.

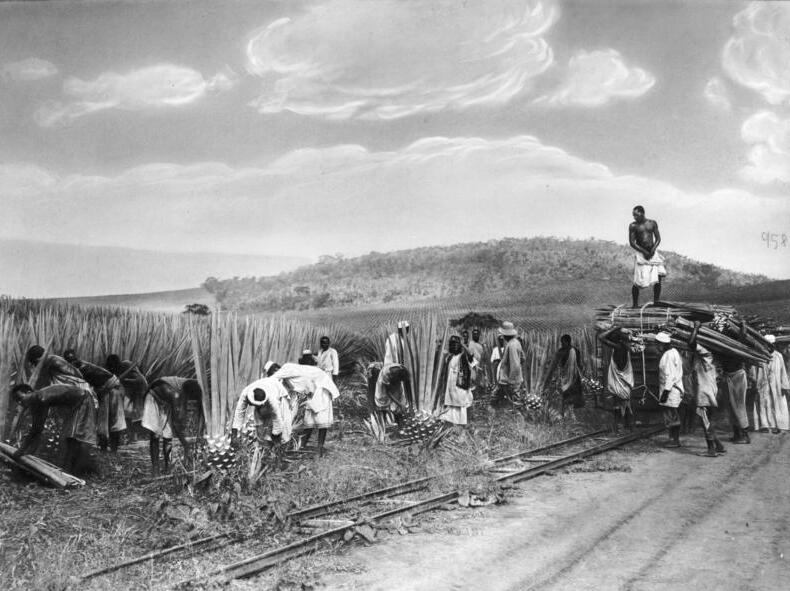
Africans working at a sisal plantation

In her 2024 article titled "Visualizing Labour in German East Africa: Photographic Images and their Circulation", Ana Carolina Schveitzer of Humboldt-Universität of Berlin discussed Dobbertin's photograph of Africans working at a sisal plantation. She noted that this and a similar photograph by Dobbertin had been published in several books and as a postcard between 1913 and 1933. According to Schveitzer, this image was published both to promote an important crop of the colonial economy and as a "form of colonial nostalgia".

Among other publications, photographs by Dobbertin have been used in books about World War I in East Africa, such as King's African Rifles Soldier vs Schutztruppe Soldier: East Africa 1917–18, German Colonialism Revisited: African, Asian, and Oceanic Experiences and Tip and Run: The Untold Tragedy of the First World War in Africa.

=== Collections ===
Parts of Dobbertin's photographic estate are held in the German Federal Archives and in international collections. In 2014, nearly 1000 photographs by Dobbertin were published on Wikimedia Commons by the German Federal Archives. The National Museum of Tanzania holds a collection of 107 glass plate negatives by Dobbertin. In the United Kingdom, Cambridge University Library owns a collection of monochrome postcards of scenes in German East Africa by Walther Dobbertin and Carl Vincenti. This library also owns a copy of Dobbertin's 1920 booklet Von Deutscher Arbeit in Deutsch-Ostafrika (Of German Work in GEA), containing monochrome photogravure postcards of agricultural and industrial scenes in German East Africa.

In the United States, there are collections of Dobbertin's photographs in the Beinecke Rare Book and Manuscript Library at Yale University and in the Humphrey Winterton Collection of East African Photographs: 1860–1960 at Northwestern University. Among other photographs, the collection at Northwestern contains an album of original platinum prints and postcards entitled Deutschostafrikanische Bilder (German: German East African pictures), published between 1900 and 1910. This collection documents the changes of European life and nature in East Africa. In particular, photographs show the construction of railways, the growth of urban centers and of German colonial administration. According to the collection, there are also "outstanding examples of portraiture", stating further that "the collection provides an unsurpassed resource for the study of the history of photography in East Africa." Finally, the webpage comments on the cultural context of the time and place in which the images were created, adding that these historical sources are "including materials that may contain offensive images or language reflecting the nature of European colonialism in Africa."
