= Demere Kitunga =

Tanzanian publisher, literacy and women's rights activist

- Citizenship: Tanzania
- Occupation: Publisher
- Known for: Literacy advocacy
- Children: 4, including Mkunde Chachage and Rehema Chachage

Demere Kitunga is a Tanzanian feminist, publisher, and literacy advocate. She is the co-founder and director of the non-profit organization Soma, which works to promote reading and literacy in Tanzania.

Through Soma, Kitunga established initiatives such as the Soma Book Café, which provides a public space for literary events and discussions. She also created Vavagaa, a storytelling platform that addresses issues of patriarchy and promotes gender equality through community engagement.

As a writer, Kitunga contributes to various literary and feminist collectives, including the Kisima cha Mashairi and the Waka Poetry Consortium. Her work often addresses themes of bodily autonomy, reproductive rights, and societal inequities. Through her advocacy, she supports the development of grassroots movements and initiatives aimed at bridging the digital divide.

== Life and career ==
Kitunga was born in Tanzania, East Africa. With the late Professor Seithy Loth Chachage, she has four children, including Mkunde Chachage, a medical researcher in Tanzania and Rehema Chachage, a visual artist and lecturer at University of Applied arts, Vienna, Austria.

Kitunga has worked in the world of literature as an author, translator, and publisher. In 2007, Kitunga co-founded E&D Readership and Development Agency, also known as Soma, a non-profit aimed at encouraging literacy, scholarship, and storytelling in Tanzania. This agency works alongside E&D Vision Publishing, where Kitunga has also supported Tanzanian authors. In 2004, she wrote the book Lupompo and the Baby Monkey. She continued by translating the book When Trees Walked into her native language Swahili. In addition to her literary career Kitunga has also co-written and appeared in research articles and books including: Reflections on Activism in Africa (with colleague Marjorie Mbilinyi), On Being Counted: Gender, Property, and "the Family", and Struggles Over Patriarchal Structural Adjustment in Tanzania. She has also co-published articles that theorize African Transformative Feminism in Tanzania.

== Advocacy ==
Kitunga is a human rights activist, literary activist, and feminist who promotes reading as a way to educate and empower. Kitunga's agency, "E&D Readership and Development", was founded with a feminist perspective, emphasizing gender equality and cultural upliftment. The organization also prioritizes research to illustrate the importance of reading, writing, and creativity for children in Tanzania. She advocates through mentoring and is a founding member of the Tanzania Gender Networking Programme which promotes gender equality in Tanzania.

== See also ==
- Kiswahili literature
- Elieshi Lema
- Walter Bgoya
