= Richard Hindorf =

German colonial agricultural scientist and traveller

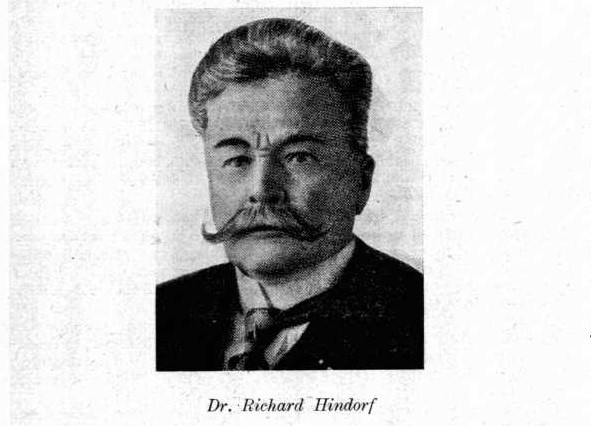
- From newspaper clipping 'Afrika Nachricht (Leipzig)
- Born: November 17, 1863; Duisburg-Ruhrort
- Died: May 13, 1954 (aged 90); Berlin-Dahlem

Richard Hindorf (November 17, 1863 – May 13, 1954) was a pioneering German colonial agricultural scientist and traveller. He worked predominantly in German East Africa (German: Deutsch-Ostafrika)

== Early life ==
Born in Ruhrort, the son of a high school teacher. Heinrich, and daughter of a bookseller, Anna Anton, he completed his early schooling in the same town. Afterwards, he moved to Halle where he studied agriculture and political science. After graduation, he spent time in New Guinea, where he managed the main station, at Finschhafen, of the New Guinea Company plantations from 1887 to 1889.

His interest in the colonial movement led him subsequently to extensive travels in Java, Sumatra, Australia, Ceylon and Egypt.

== German East Africa ==
He arrived in German East Africa for the German East Africa Company in 1891, and despite later upheavals, he was to return to it several times later throughout his life. Upon arrival, he set up one of the earliest coffee plantations in Derema, in the Usambara Mountains. Further plantings of pepper, cocoa and nutmeg were also initiated at his behest in Segoma. He also journeyed to German South West Africa (German: Deutsch-Südwestafrika) and South Africa, and again to Java and Ceylon, then Mozambique and Cameroon.

His most important agricultural contribution in German East Africa to farming in the area of the Usambara and Tanga regions was, however, to be the introduction of sisal. This extremely successful implantation in 1892-3 of Agave sisalana was after he had taken note of mention of the plant in the Kew Bulletin no.62 which had pointed to its potential success in climatic conditions similar to Mexico. Initially, 62 bulbils survived of the first 1000 brought by him to the mouth of the Pangani River. Nevertheless, the rapid adoption and unimagined success of the fertile sisal plantations eventually led the product to be the chief export of the country for many years to come and the fibre obtained from this 'blonde gold' was a vital source of income for the economy. Eventually, Tanganyika was to become the world's largest exporter of sisal.

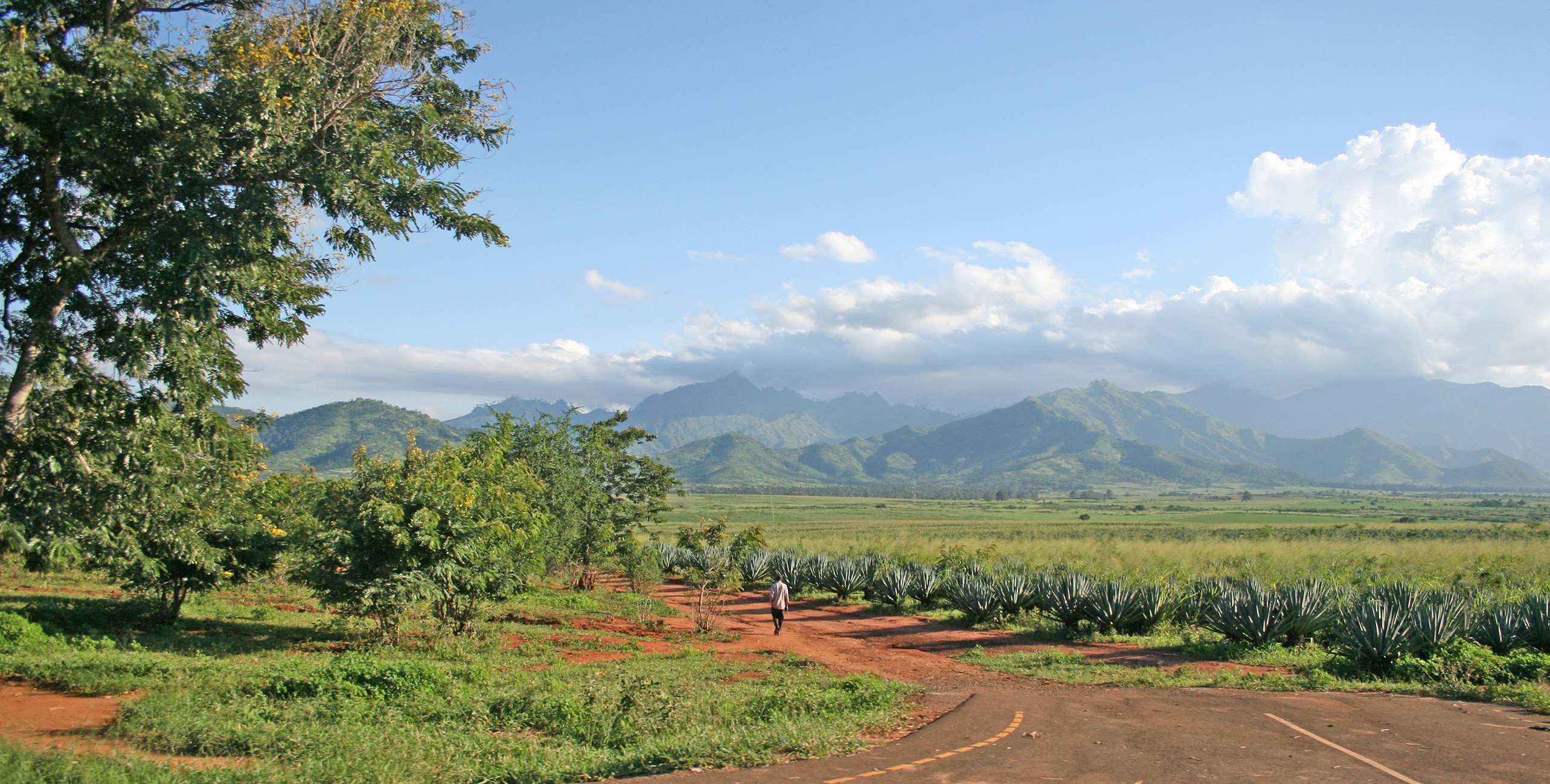
Sisal plantations at Mt Uluguru

His other most significant contribution was in the foundation of the Amani Research Institute. As early as 1890, in the German Kolonialzeitung, No. 21, he had promoted the idea of a research station in German East Africa along the models of other similar stations in British and Dutch colonies.

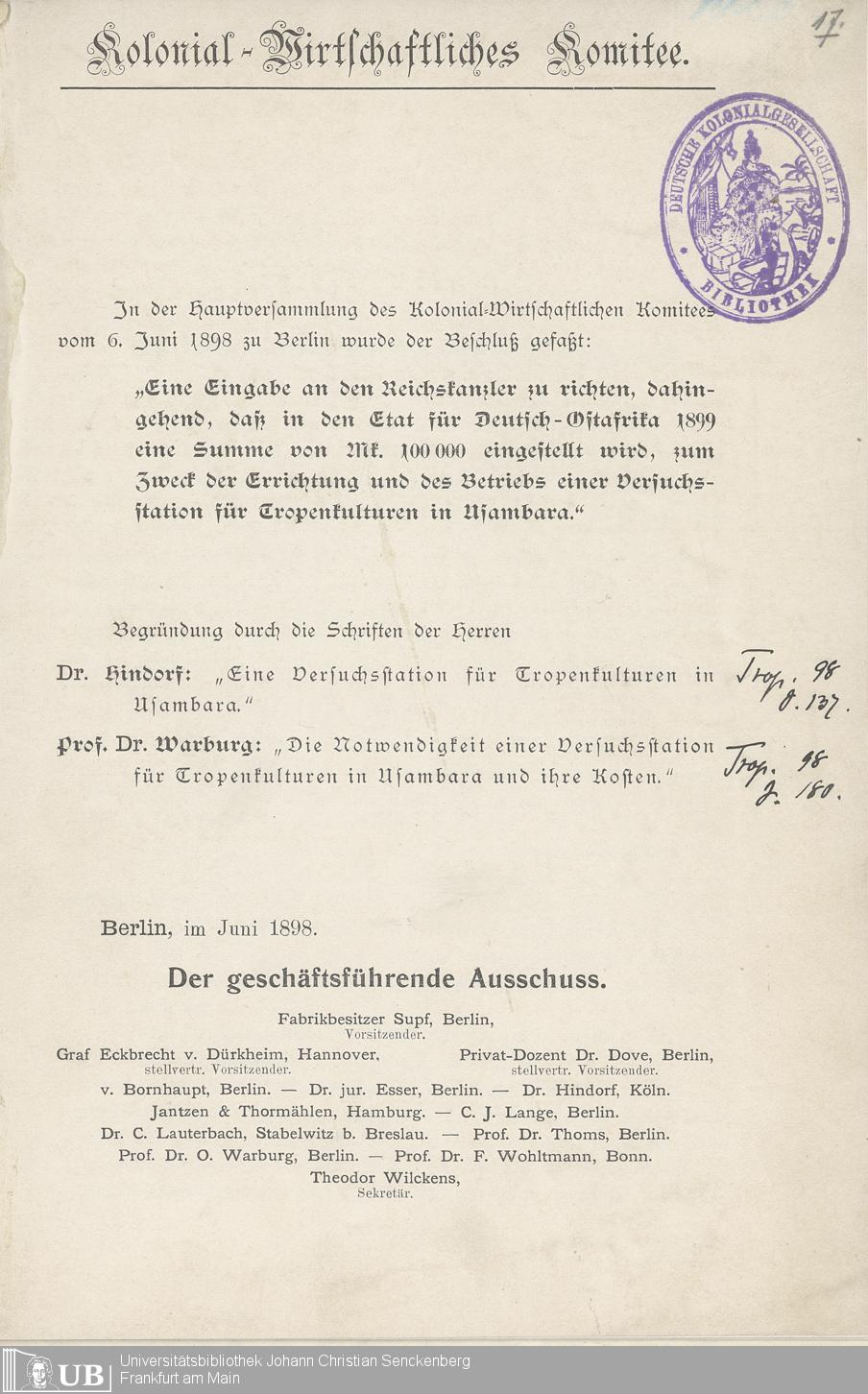
Recommendation for a tropical research station in German East Africa 1898

The Colonial Economic Committee (German: Kolonial-wirtschaftliches Komitee), of which he was a co-founder, passed the resolution in June 1898, in Berlin, "to send a submission to the Reich Chancellor that there is set for... German East Africa in 1899 a sum of 100,000 Marks with the purpose of the setting up and operation of a research station for tropical cultures in Usambara." This was justified by the appended articles of Dr Hindorf: “A research station for tropical cultures in Usambara" and Prof. Dr. Otto Warburg: “The need for an experimental station for tropical crops in Usambara and its cost" With the assistance of Franz Stuhlmann, the project soon got off the ground to become one of the finest botanical gardens and research stations of the colonies, situated in Amani, in the West Usambara mountains.

Apart from being co-founder of the Amani Research Institute, Hindorf was also the co-founder of the German colonial school in Witzenhausen in 1898.

With the outbreak of World War I, he was drafted in 1915, and served as a captain in the army under Paul von Lettow-Vorbeck, and in 1916 as Etappenleiter for the Landetappenkommandos, participating in the famous resistance of the German troops in that colonial outpost during the entirety of the war. In November 1917, however, he was captured at Ndanda, and interned unwounded by British troops in Dar es salaam.

In 1953 he was awarded the Federal Cross of Merit (German: Steckkreuz) of the Federal Republic of Germany.

== Publications ==
- Leitfaden zur Erlernung der Malayischen Umgangssprache. 4. Aufl. Berlin 1913.
- Der landwirthschaftliche Werth und die Besiedelungsfähigkeit Deutsch-Südwestafrikas. Berlin 1895, 3. Aufl. ebd. 1925.
- Heinrich Semler: Die tropische Agrikultur. Ein Handbuch für Pflanzer und Kaufleute. Wismar 1886–1893. Neubearbeitet und herausgegeben von Richard Hindorf. Bd. * 1–3, Wismar 1897, 1900 u. 1903.
- Der Sisalbau in Deutsche-Ostafrika. Berlin 1925.
