= Mkunde Chachage =

Tanzanian researcher and lecturer (born 1984)

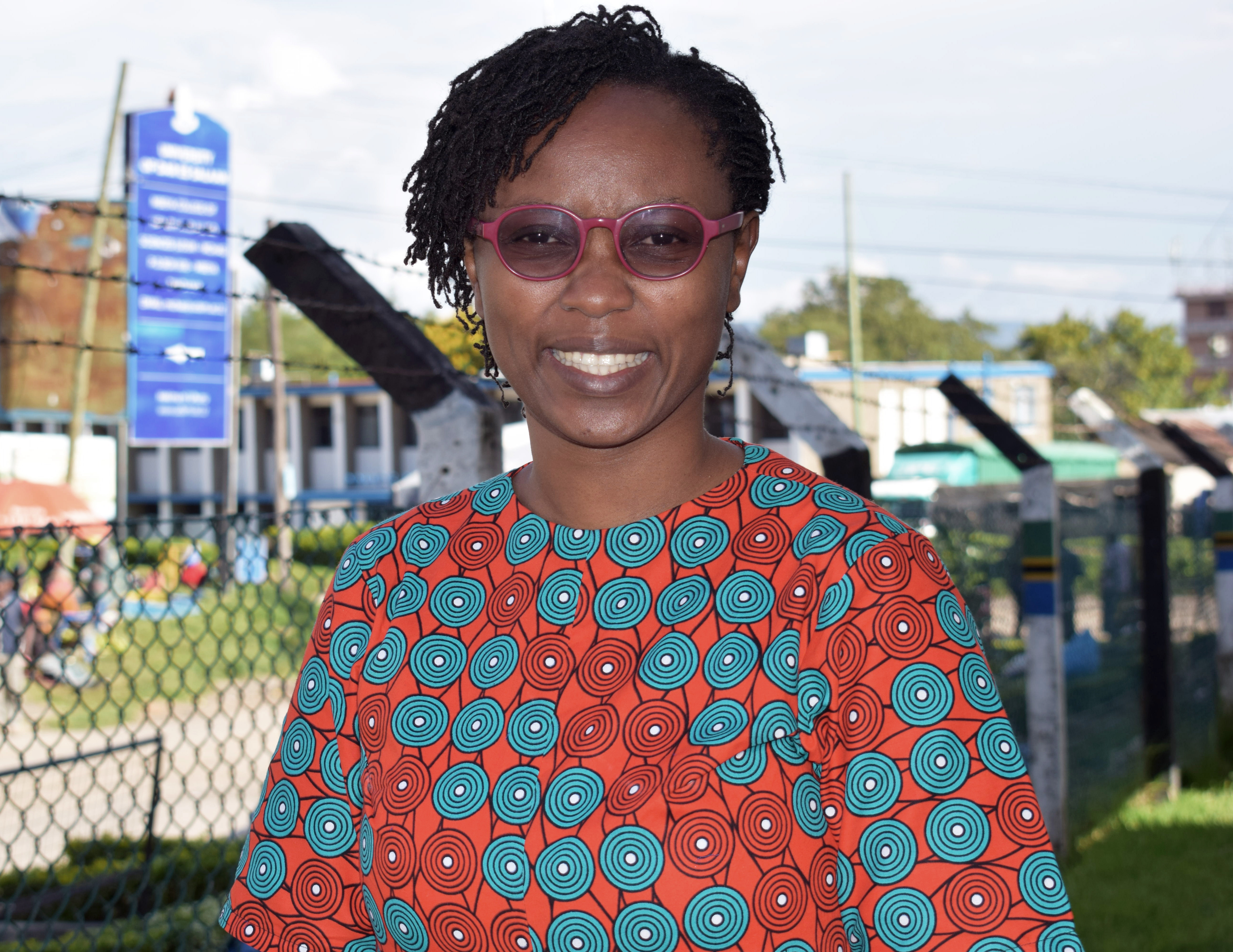
Mkunde Chachage at University of Dar es Salaam Mbeya College of Health and Allied Sciences (UDSM-MCHAS)

Mkunde Chachage (born June 2, 1984) is a lecturer and researcher in immunology at University of Dar es Salaam Mbeya College of Health and Allied Sciences (UDSM – MCHAS). She is also a researcher at the National Institute for Medical Research at Mbeya medical research centre (NIMR - MMRC). She conducts research in clinical immunology as well as infectious diseases of human including Tuberculosis (TB), HIV and helminths infections.

== Early life ==
Chachage comes from a family of academics and activists. She was born in Dar es Salaam to the late Professor Chachage Seithy Loth Chachage and Demere Kitunga as one of 4 children. Her father was an academic, political analyst and author. Her mother is an activist, a feminist writer, advocate of literacy, editor and publisher in Tanzania. Two of her siblings are also academics, Chambi Chachage, is a scholar of African studies at Princeton University and political analyst, and Rehema Chachage, a visual artist and academic at University of Applied Arts Vienna, Austria.

Chachage spent her childhood in Dar es Salaam, Tanzania, where she also obtained her primary education at Mlimani primary and Dar es Salaam independent schools before completing secondary education at Aga Khan Mzizima secondary school. She is married to Keremba Brian Warioba, with whom she co-founded a social enterprise, and the couple has one child.^{[cn]}

== Education ==
Chachage has a PhD in International Health – Immunology from LMU Munich, Germany, obtained in 2013. Her PhD thesis investigated the alterations of the human immune system due to helminths infection and influence on risk for getting HIV infection or potential to accelerate HIV disease progression for people living with HIV Prior to this, she had obtained a Bachelor of Science in Molecular and Cellular Biology from University of Cape Town in 2007, followed by an honours degree in the following year from the same institute.

== Career ==
Chachage joined the NIMR - MMRC in 2009 as junior researcher. She returned to the research centre soon after obtaining her PhD, where she led the immunology laboratory focusing on research related to immunodiagnostics and immunopathogenesis of TB, HIV and HIV-HPV interaction.

Chachage was an affiliate of the African Academy of Sciences (AAS) third cohort between 2018–2022. She has held multiple fellowships in the past, including a post-doctoral fellowship at the Burnet Institute, Melbourne, Australia, between 2015 and 2016, and the African - Oxford (AfOx) fellowship for African researchers in 2020, which allows her to collaborate with researchers at Oxford in an ongoing microbiome study. Chachage is also a fellow of the International AIDS Society (IAS) where she works with other scientists on research and evolving technologies for cure of HIV.

Apart from research work, she has taught a course on Immunology of Infectious diseases at Nelson Mandela African Institute of Science and Technology (NM-AIST), in Arusha, Tanzania. In January 2019 she joined University of Dar es Salaam as an academician teaching and conducting research on immunology related subjects.

Chachage is also an entrepreneur who co-founded a social enterprise that helps local coffee growers in Tanzania find markets for their harvest.

== Awards ==
- Best overall scientist at NIMR awarded by National Institute For Medical Research (NIMR) (2018)
- Best Research Scientist at NIMR – Mbeya research centre awarded by National Institute For Medical Research (NIMR) in recognition for research work in HIV & TB confections (2018)
- Dr. Maria Kamm Best Young Woman Scientist Award awarded by National Institute For Medical Research (NIMR) (2012)
