= Karl Braun (botanist) =

German botanist (1870–1935)

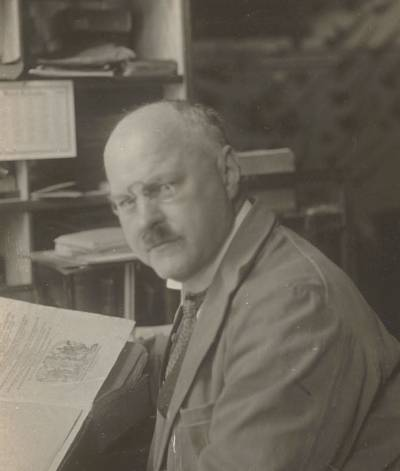
- Karl Braun in 1904
- Born: March 14, 1870; Biebrich, Rhineland Palatinate, German Empire
- Died: October 27, 1935 (aged 65); Stade, German Reich
- Education: Ludwig-Maximilians-Universität München, University of Basel
- Occupations: botanist, plant pathologist
- Years active: 1890–1934

Philipp Johann Georg Karl Braun was a German botanist and plant pathologist. After his academic training and initial positions at universities in Germany and Switzerland, he worked at the Amani Agricultural Research Institute in the Usambara Mountains in the former colony German East Africa from 1904 to 1920.

In the course of World War I, the Amani Institute was taken over by the British administration from 1916 on. Due to their expertise and experience, which was recognised by British scientists, Braun and some of his German colleagues were able to continue working until 1920. After his return to Germany, he served as a senior government councillor at the branch office of the Biological Research Institute for Agriculture and Forestry in Stade until his retirement in 1934.

As part of a German-Tanzanian research project, Braun's collection of historical artefacts and documents found in the attic of a museum in Stade is presented to the public in a 2025 exhibition. This exhibition is meant as an opportunity to engage with colonial history, offering new perspectives on historical cultural artefacts and documents and their significance for the past and present.

== Life and career ==
=== Early life and education ===
Karl Braun was born in Biebrich on 14 March 1870, the son of Karl Ludwig Braun and Marie Elise Braun, née Lembach. From 1879, he attended the Realgymnasium in his home town. After his family moved to Wiesbaden in 1885, he completed his schooling there. He then worked as an assistant in the pharmacy of his future father-in-law in Elberfeld. Next, Braun began studying pharmacy at the Ludwig-Maximilians-Universität München, where he graduated in 1895. Between 1895 and 1896, he worked as a military pharmacist at the Mainz garrison hospital. In 1898, he began a second degree in physics, zoology and botany at the University of Basel, Switzerland. He completed this in 1900 with a dissertation titled Contributions to the anatomy of Adansonia digitata (African baobab).

Between 1900 and 1902, Braun worked as an assistant at the chemical laboratory of the Royal Veterinary College in Stuttgart. He then worked as an assistant at the Institute for Plant Protection in Hohenheim near Stuttgart. On 1 June 1904, he was invited by Carl von Tubeuf, Professor of Plant Pathology at the Ludwig-Maximilians-Universität München, to apply for the position of assistant botanist to Franz Stuhlmann, the founder of the Imperial Biological and Agricultural Institute Amani in the then-colony of German East Africa.

=== German Amani Research Institute ===
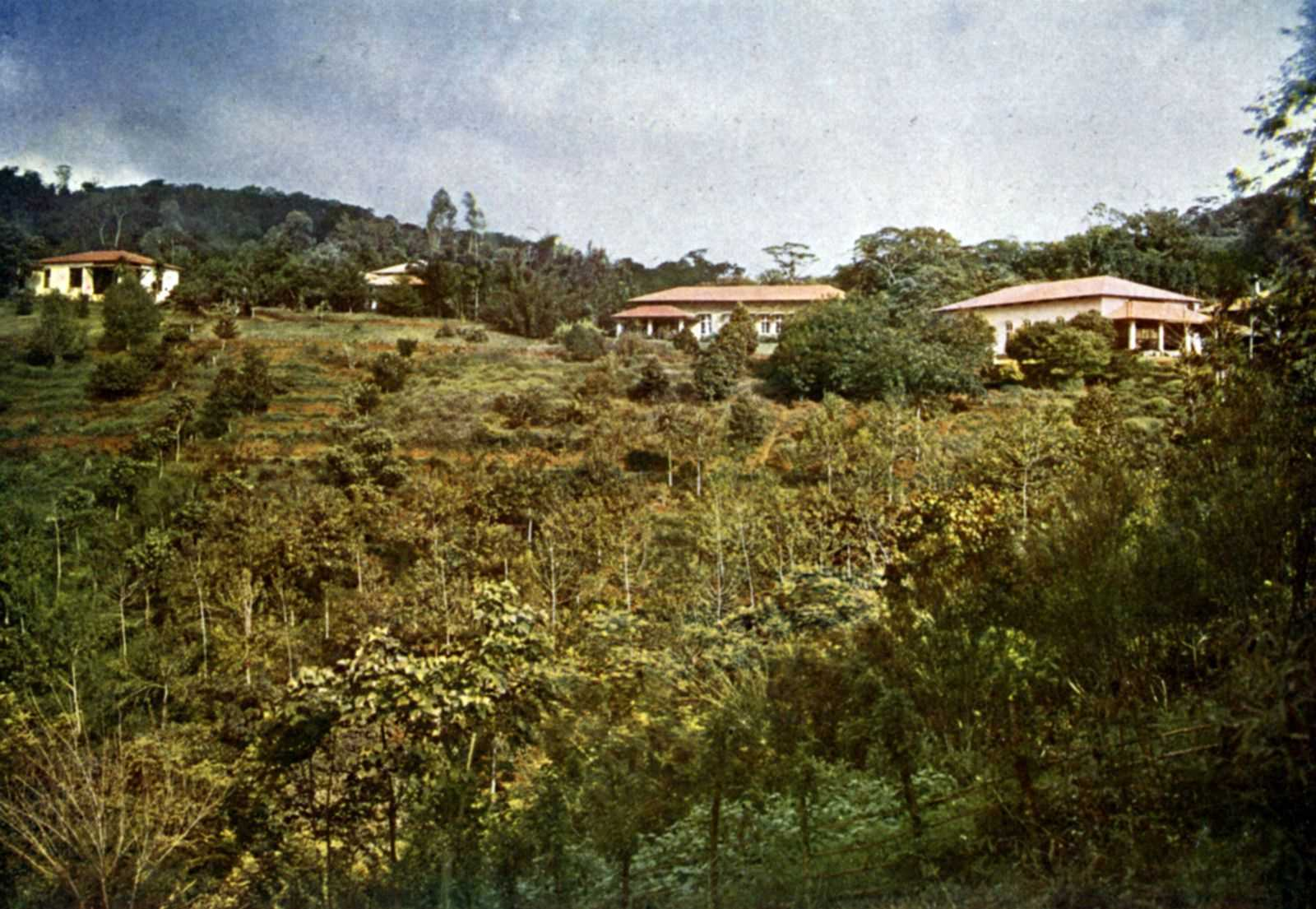
The Biological Research Institute in Amani, German East Africa, before 1910

The Amani Institute was founded in September 1902 in the Usambara Mountains in the hinterland of the harbour town of Tanga. The task assigned to the institute by the German colonial administration was to research the flora and fauna of German East Africa and to establish a large botanical garden with plants from various countries. Specifically, this meant researching tropical plants such as sisal or coffee for the colonial economy. Other tasks were scientific analyses for improving the available soil, as well as for animal and plant products or extracts that were of interest for human consumption or medicine. Examples of the latter were cinchona bark trees, which were used to produce quinine to combat malaria.

During Stuhlmann's absence, the institute was under the deputy management of botanist Albrecht Zimmermann, and Braun worked there as head botanist. Among other tasks, he studied indigenous crops such as the sisal agave and various types of bottle gourd. Braun was also responsible for the herbarium and the expansion of the botanical garden. In various studies, he devoted himself to researching poisonous plants and their traditional use as arrow poisons. Further, he travelled extensively to various areas of the colony. He advised privately run farms, documented their yields and wrote annual reports on the economic situation in the different regions. In the course of his work, he built up a personal ethnographic and natural history collection.

=== Amani in World War I ===
After the start of the First World War in 1914, the Amani Institute became a vital production centre, military hospital and refugee camp for Europeans in the colony. When German East Africa was cut off from the sea by a British blockade, medicines, most of all for treating malaria, asthma and heart diseases, but also bandages, distilled alcohol, soap, chocolate and toothpaste were produced in Amani for the Germans and their native African troops. Being a trained pharmacist, Braun played a crucial role in the production of such medical items.

When the institute was seized by the British administration in 1916, production continued for their needs. Contrary to the usual fate of prisoners of war, the British allowed some of the German scientists and their families to remain in Amani during the war, making use of their experience and the institute's infrastructure. Sometimes, the Germans even received salary payments and benefits from the British administration. As Braun noted in his diaries, German and British scientists lived together without major problems, in keeping with the circumstances, and sometimes even spent evenings playing cards together.

In September 1916, A. C. MacDonald, the British administration's first Director of Agriculture, described Amani as "one of the most important agricultural stations in the tropics" and called on the military government to maintain the station. When the United Kingdom received the League of Nations mandate over Tanganyika in 1920, the colonial administration appointed Alleyne Leechman as director of Amani. In his correspondence, Leechman requested that the more experienced of his German colleagues stay on to help with the transition of the station into British hands. Referring to Karl Braun, he wrote: "He has already published a large number of original papers on the economic and medicinal plants of the colony and has been mainly responsible for organising the magnificent library, where his advice will be invaluable. He also has a vast knowledge of the flora of the district. [...] He has also done an excellent job as the head of the dispensary. Though not a qualified doctor, he was originally a pharmaceutical chemist. Since February 1919 he has treated nearly 1800 patients and vaccinated nearly 400. His private means have been exhausted and his prospects in Germany are conceivably poor."

=== Further career in Stade ===
After his return to Germany, Braun worked as a senior civil servant at the branch office of the Biological Research Centre for Agriculture and Forestry in the northern German city of Stade until his retirement in 1934. He died there on 27 October 1935.

== Research project on Braun's collection ==
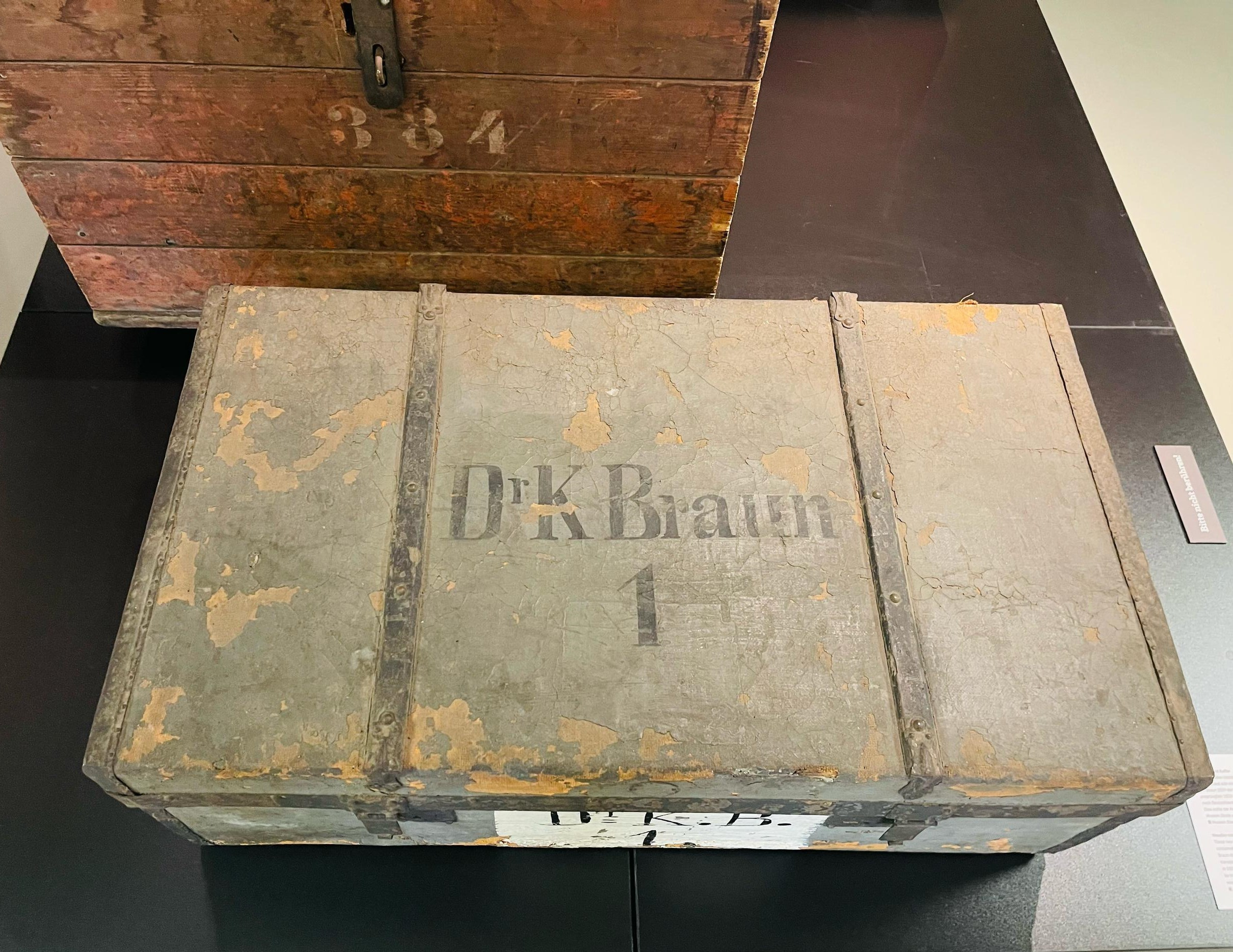
Trunk and suitcase from Karl Braun collection, before 1920

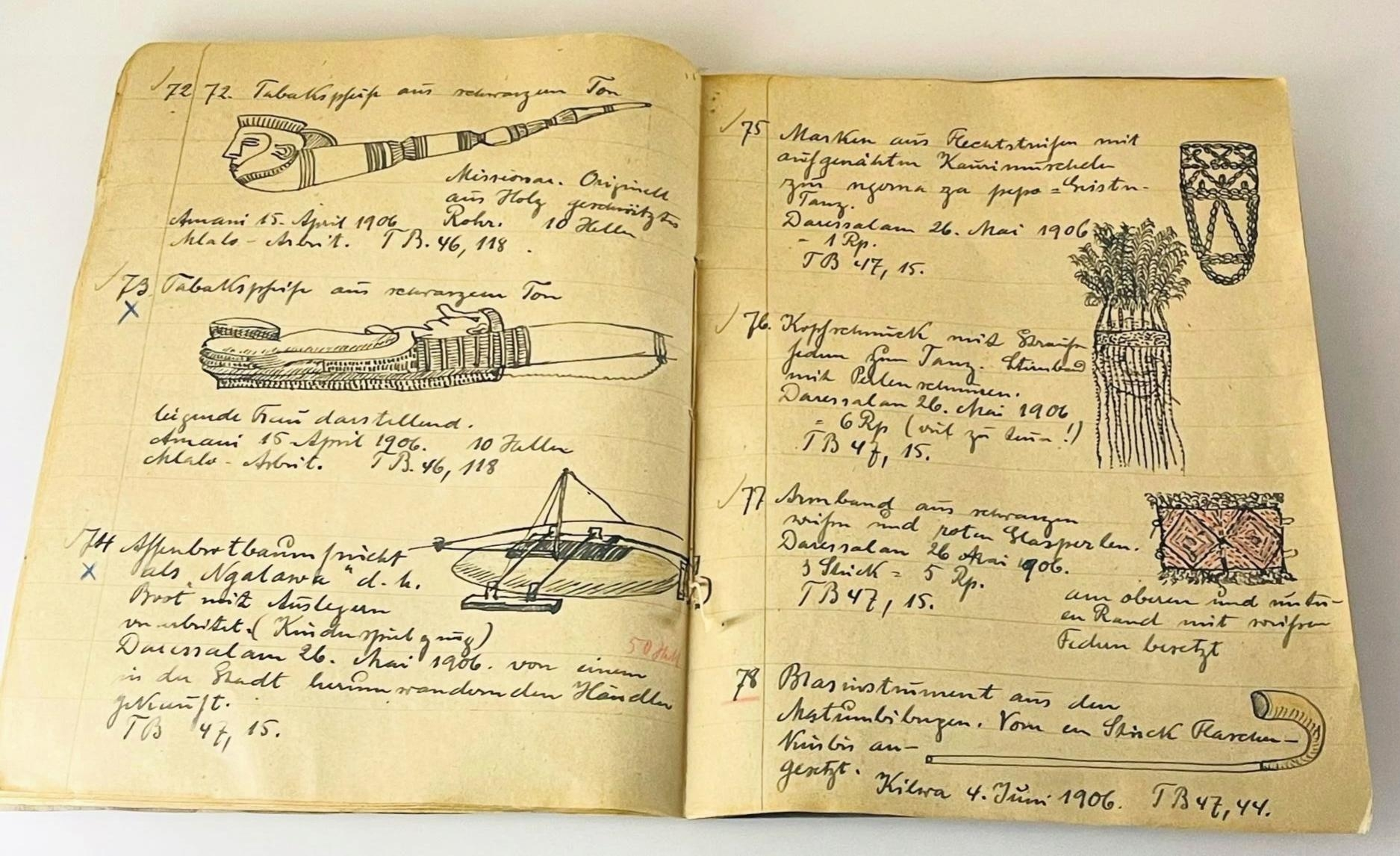
Page from Karl Braun's diary with information on his collection

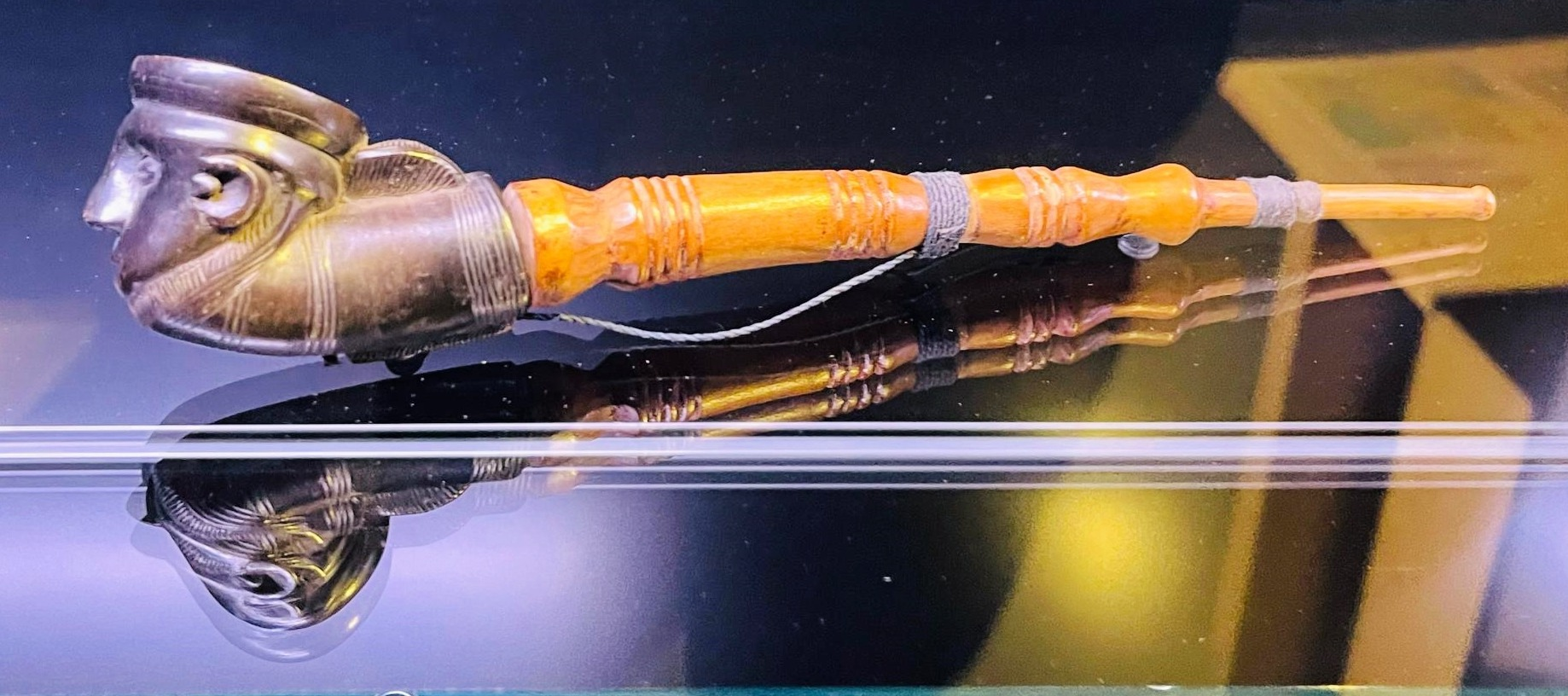
Tobacco pipe for a missionary, acquired 1906

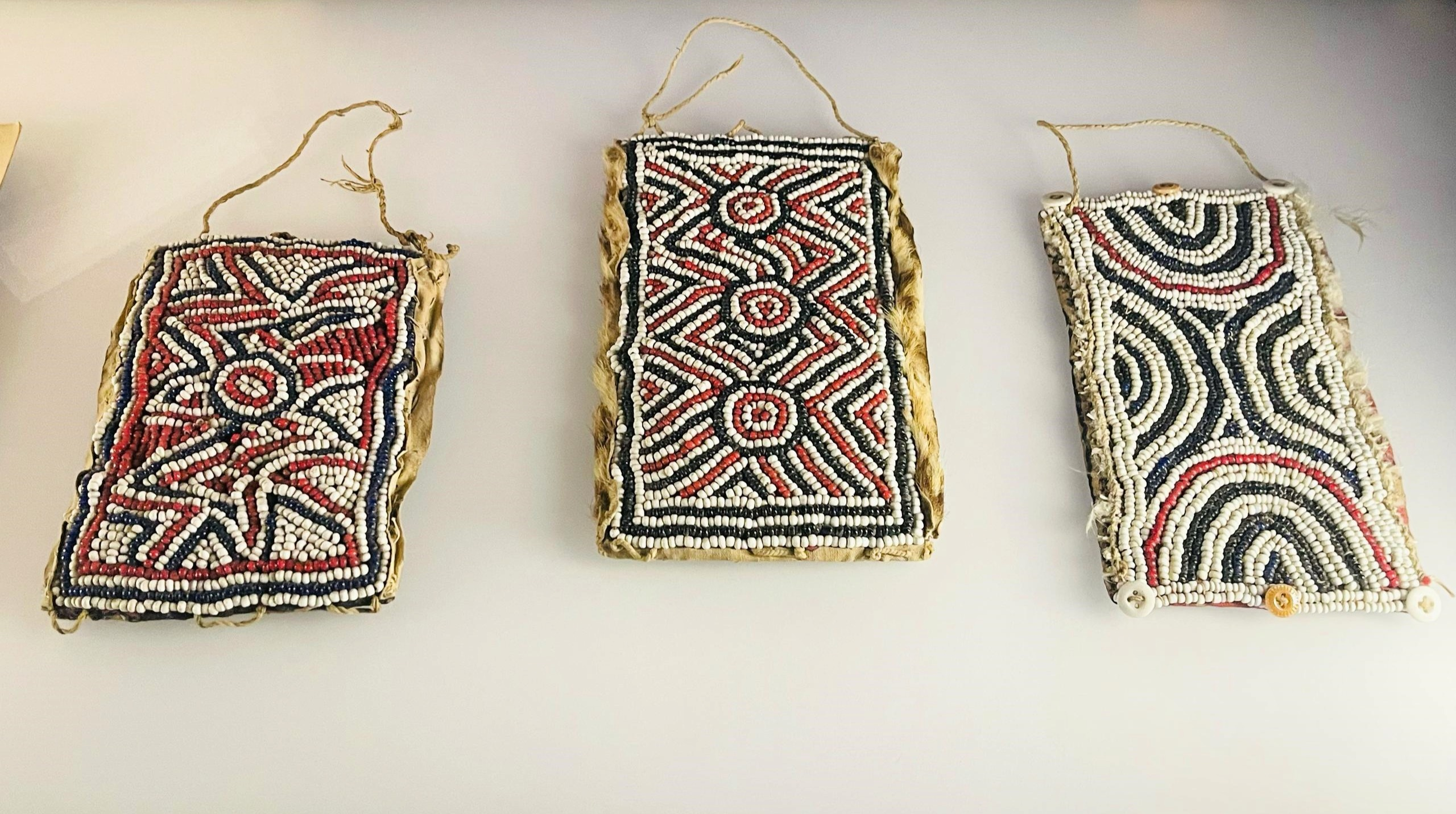
Three traditional bracelets with glass beads, acquired by Braun before 1910 in Kilwa

During renovation work in 2014, Sebastian Möllers, the director of the Schwedenspeicher Museum in Stade, came across two trunks and a suitcase containing almost 600 ethnographic objects from the former colony of German East Africa. These are part of Braun's collection that he had bequeathed to the city of Stade shortly before his death.

The extensive collection, which includes samples of plants, household objects, weapons, instruments and textiles, demonstrates Braun's interest in processing techniques and the use of local materials. These objects thus document not only the cultures of the communities of origin, but above all the contexts of their appropriation, the imbalance of colonial appropriation of knowledge and the exploitation of natural resources in the former colonies. What is unusual about the collection is that it not only contains many objects, but also numerous documents. Braun's diaries, which he kept meticulously every day, are not only numbered, but can also be linked to many documents, drawings, photographs by himself and by Dar es Salaam photographer Carl Vincenti. According to the project management, Braun had purchased most of the objects. However, as this took place in the context of colonial rule, historians today assume that the cultural appropriation took place under violent conditions.

The project "The Karl Braun Collection and the role of the Amani Institute during the German colonial period in Tanzania" is funded by the German Lost Art Foundation, that has also been supporting provenance research into collections with colonial origins as a focus since 2019. The museums in Stade are cooperating with the National Institute for Medical Research (NIMR) in Tanzania, which today operates the Amani Hill Station. The central themes of the research project are the appropriation of the knowledge of the subjugated indigenous population, whom Braun sometimes interviewed "to the point of exhaustion", as he described in his diaries. Other aspects are the economic exploitation of the colony and questions about how plants and raw materials were cultivated and processed and which animal species were used.

In this context, Lea Steinkampf, a member of the German team, emphasized that the Tanzanian colleagues from the National Institute for Medical Research have been carrying out their research in Tanzania, partially based on oral history, as mutual cooperation is considered "a top priority for the project." Further, she noted that people in Tanzania are far more aware of Germany's colonial history than in Germany. Members of the German-Tanzanian project group continue to be involved in an Amani-related network, which met for the first time in February 2023 at the invitation of the Goethe-Institut in Dar es Salaam, bringing together various institutions interested in the history and future of the project.

== Exhibition ==
From 15 February to 9 June 2025, the historical and art museums in Stade are presenting the special exhibition AMANI kukita | kung'oa (planted | uprooted) presenting German and Tanzanian perspectives on Karl Braun's collection. This is the first time that the results of the three-year research project on Braun's ethnographic and natural history collection are presented to the public. In addition to the exhibition, the programme includes guided tours, scientific lectures, film screenings and activities for children and young people. In addition, German and Tanzanian artists present their artworks as a contemporary reflection on German colonial history. The accompanying catalogue was published in German, English and Swahili, the national language of Tanzania.

== Selected publications ==
- Beiträge zur Anatomie der Adansonia digitata L. F. Reinhardt, 1900. (in German)
- Die Fusikladium- oder Schorfkrankheit. Berlin-Dahlem, Biologische Reichsanstalt für Land- u. Forstwirtschaft, 1929, 10. Auflage. (in German)
- Überblick über die Geschichte der Pflanzenkrankheiten und Pflanzenschädlinge (bis 1880). In Paul Sorauer: Handbuch der Pflanzenkrankheiten, Vol. I. Berlin, 1933, pp. 1–79. (in German)

Braun also published numerous articles based on his research in Amani in Der Pflanzer. Journal for Agriculture and Forestry in German East Africa.
