= National Institute for Medical Research (Tanzania) =

Tanzanian institution for health research

The National Institute for Medical Research (NIMR) in Tanzania is a parastatal institution dedicated to advancing health research and enhancing public health in the country. Established in 1980, NIMR operates under the Ministry of Health and Social Welfare and has grown to include over 260 researchers. The institute's mission is to conduct, regulate, coordinate, and promote health research that addresses the needs and wellbeing of Tanzanians.

NIMR has several research centers and stations across Tanzania, including laboratories with biosafety levels ranging from 1 to 4. The institute focuses on a wide range of health research areas, including traditional medical practices, disease prevention, and the development of herbal medicine. The institute also collaborates with numerous national and international organizations to promote health research and innovation.

== History ==
In the late 19th century, the colonial government of German East Africa introduced modern scientific research to Tanganyika. Initially, the German botanical and agricultural research station in Amani operated from 1904 to 1916. During this period, visiting German bacteriologists Robert Koch, who in 1905 won the Nobel Prize, and Gustav Giemsa were among the first scientists to contribute to the diagnosis of tuberculosis and malaria in the country.

After World War I, Tanganyika became a British protectorate. In 1922, the British colonial government set up a Sleeping Sickness Service Unit in Tabora. In 1963, the Sleeping Sickness Unit was taken over by the Ministry of Health of independent Tanganyika. The unit, now the Tabora Research Centre, is the oldest medical research unit in Tanzania. In 1948, the British Colonial government started the Filariasis Research Unit in Mwanza. In 1954 this was renamed East African Institute for Medical Research, operating under the East African High Commission (EAHC). Also under the EAHC, the East African Malaria Institute (EAMI) replaced the former botanical research station in Amani in 1951 and was known from 1954 as the East African Institute of Malaria and Vector Borne Diseases (EAIMVBD).

Following independence in 1961 and prior to the establishment of NIMR, public health research institutions in Tanzania were under the auspices of the East African Medical Research Council (EAMRC), established in 1957. Among the major objectives of the EAMRC were the recruitment of and training of African research personnel from the East African Community member states of Uganda, Kenya and Tanzania. In 1968, the East African Medical Research Council set up a Tuberculosis Investigating Unit in Dar es Salaam. Following the dissolution of the East African Community in 1977, the government of Tanzania proceeded to reorganise the health research centres into the National Institute for Medical Research (NIMR). As a consequence, NIMR was entrusted with the responsibility of assuming control over all health research institutions in the country.

== Present ==
The National Institute for Medical Research was established by the Parliament Act No. 23 of 1979 as a parastatal organization under the Ministry of Health. In operation since 1980, it has become the largest research institution in Tanzania for public health. In establishing NIMR, the government recognised the need to generate scientific information required to develop better methods and techniques to improve disease management, prevention and control in the country. Its key objectives include:

- Health Research: Conducting and promoting research to alleviate diseases.
- Traditional Medicine: Investigating and developing herbal medicines from local practices.
- Training: Collaborating to train local personnel in scientific research.
- Coordination: Monitoring and evaluating medical research for the government's benefit.
- Registration: Registering and promoting practical applications of research findings.
- Information Dissemination: Documenting and sharing medical research information.
- Disease Control: Investigating causes and control methods for diseases.
- Comprehensive Research: Conducting basic, applied, and operational research to control endemic diseases.

=== Achievements ===
NIMR has been active in HIV/AIDS research, contributing to the understanding and management of the disease. Their work includes studies on diagnosis, disease monitoring, drug resistance, and vaccinology. During the COVID-19 pandemic, NIMR worked in Tanzania's scientific response. They led various public health committees and provided recommendations to the government on scaling up public health measures. Further, NIMR has conducted extensive research on malaria, including studies on the disease's transmission, prevention, and treatment. Their work has contributed to the development of effective malaria control strategies. NIMR has also investigated and developed herbal medicines based on local traditional practices. This research has facilitated the integration of traditional medicine into modern healthcare. Apart from these scientific achievements, NIMR has trained numerous local researchers and healthcare professionals, strengthening Tanzania's capacity for scientific research and healthcare delivery.

In May 2024, professor Said Aboud, the Director General of NIMR and a virologist instrumental in leading Tanzania's scientific response to the COVID-19 pandemic, was named among the 100 Most Influential Africans for that year. This honour was awarded by the Pan-African organization The Business Executive Group in Accra, which distinguished 100 individuals across Africa for their "exceptional contributions to Africa’s socio-economic, political, and cultural landscape."

== Research centres ==
NIMR runs several research centres and stations across the country:

1. Amani Research Centre: Located in the Usambara Mountains, this center focuses on tropical diseases and environmental health.
2. Muhimbili Research Centre: Situated in Dar es Salaam, it conducts research on various health issues, including infectious diseases and non-communicable diseases.
3. Mwanza Research Centre: Located in Mwanza, this center focuses on research related to HIV/AIDS, malaria, and other infectious diseases.
4. Tabora Research Centre: Situated in Tabora, it conducts research on traditional medicine and herbal remedies.
5. Tanga Research Centre: Located in Tanga, this center focuses on research related to infectious diseases and health systems.

== International cooperation ==
As part of Tanzania's governmental actions, the Ministry of Health, including NIMR and other stakeholders have been collaborating with the World Health Organization. The Mbeya Medical Research Center has entertained a long-standing cooperation with the German Center for Infection Research and the LMU Klinikum. Another example for international cooperation is a project between NIMR and the Social Sciences Research Ethics Committee of the University of Birmingham in 2006/2007. This project focused on research on how families with children suffering from HIV/AIDS were affected in Tanzania and the United Kingdom. Other such projects of NIMR's international cooperation have included UNESCO, UNICEF, USAID, the Swiss Tropical Institute and Imperial College London.

Since 2019, NIMR has been participating in a German-Tanzanian project about the Karl Braun collection of historical artefacts and documents from Amani. Presented to the public in an exhibition at the municipal museum in the German city of Stade in 2025, this ongoing project is meant as an opportunity to provide new perspectives on Tanzanian and German colonial history as well as its significance in the past and present.

== See also ==
- Healthcare in Tanzania
- Health in Tanzania

== Literature ==
- Magesa, Stephen & Mwape, Bonard & Mboera, Leonard. (2012). Challenges and opportunities in building health research capacity in Tanzania: A case of the National Institute for Medical Research. Tanzania Journal of Health Research. 13. 10.4314/thrb.v13i5.11.
