= Amani Research Institute =

Research institute in Muheza District, Tanzania

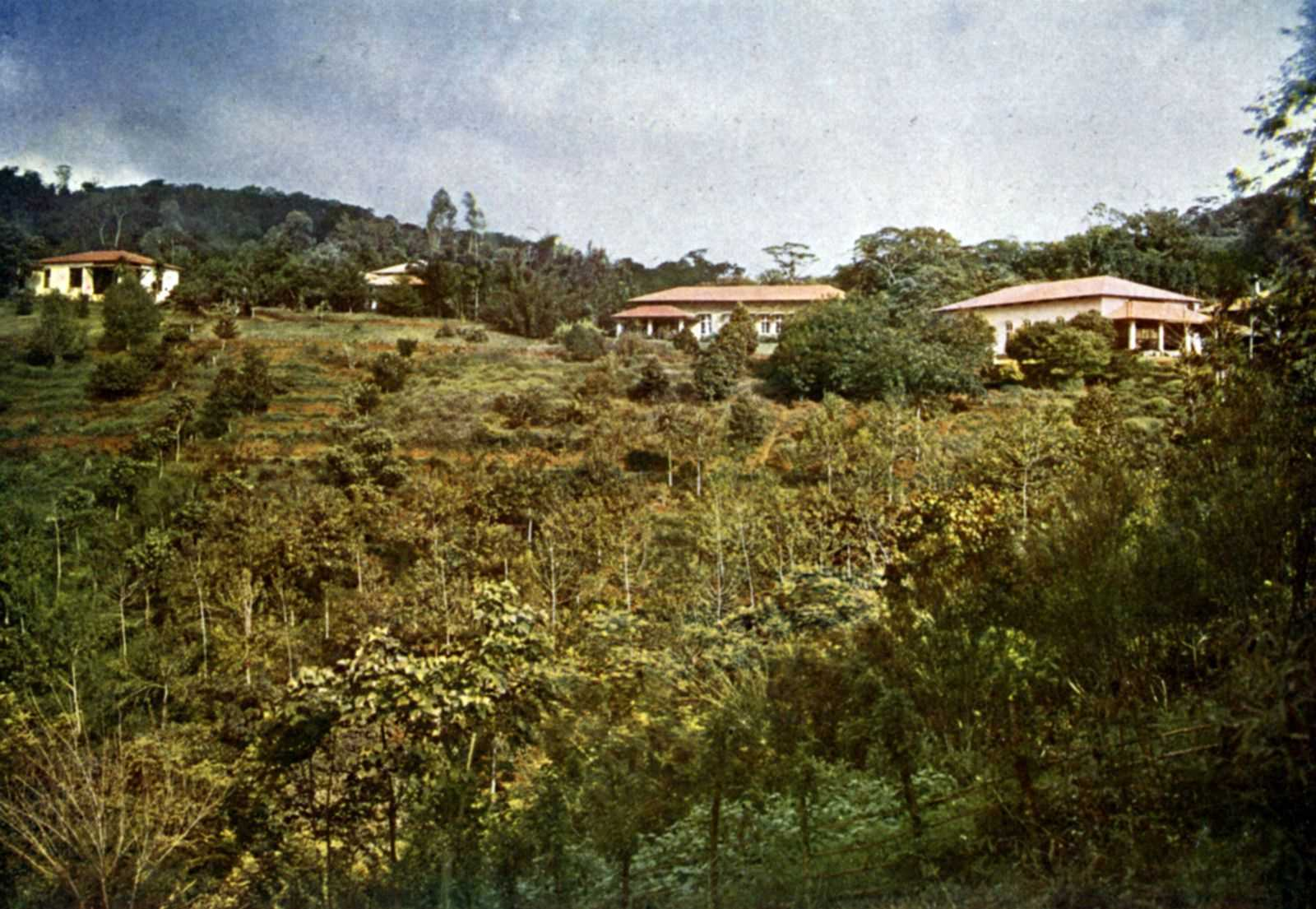
The biological research institute in Amani, before 1910

Amani Research institute is a research institute located at Amani, in the Muheza District, on the Eastern Usambara Mountains of the northeastern region in present-day Tanzania. The mountains form part of the Eastern Arc Mountains, which stretch from Kenya through Tanzania, and are covered by tropical cloud forests that have endured a long period of unique evolutionary endemism.

Founded during colonial rule in German East Africa in 1902 as research institute, it gained a strong reputation for botanical and agricultural research, as well as for the investigation of tropical diseases and the production of medical products. After World War I, work at Amani was continued under British administration and later became a station of the National Institute for Medical Research (NIMR) of Tanzania.

== History ==
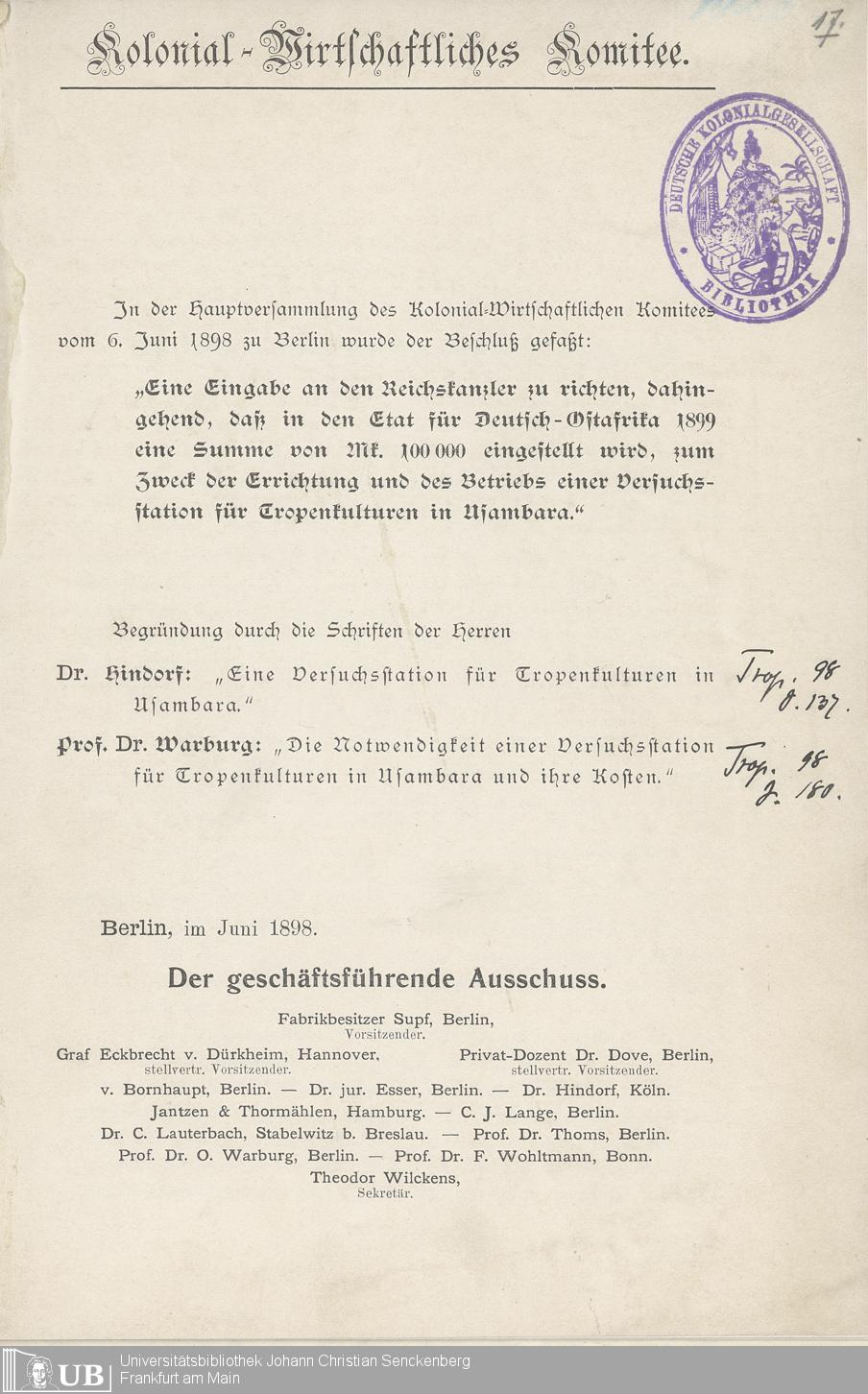
Recommendation for a tropical research station in German East Africa 1898

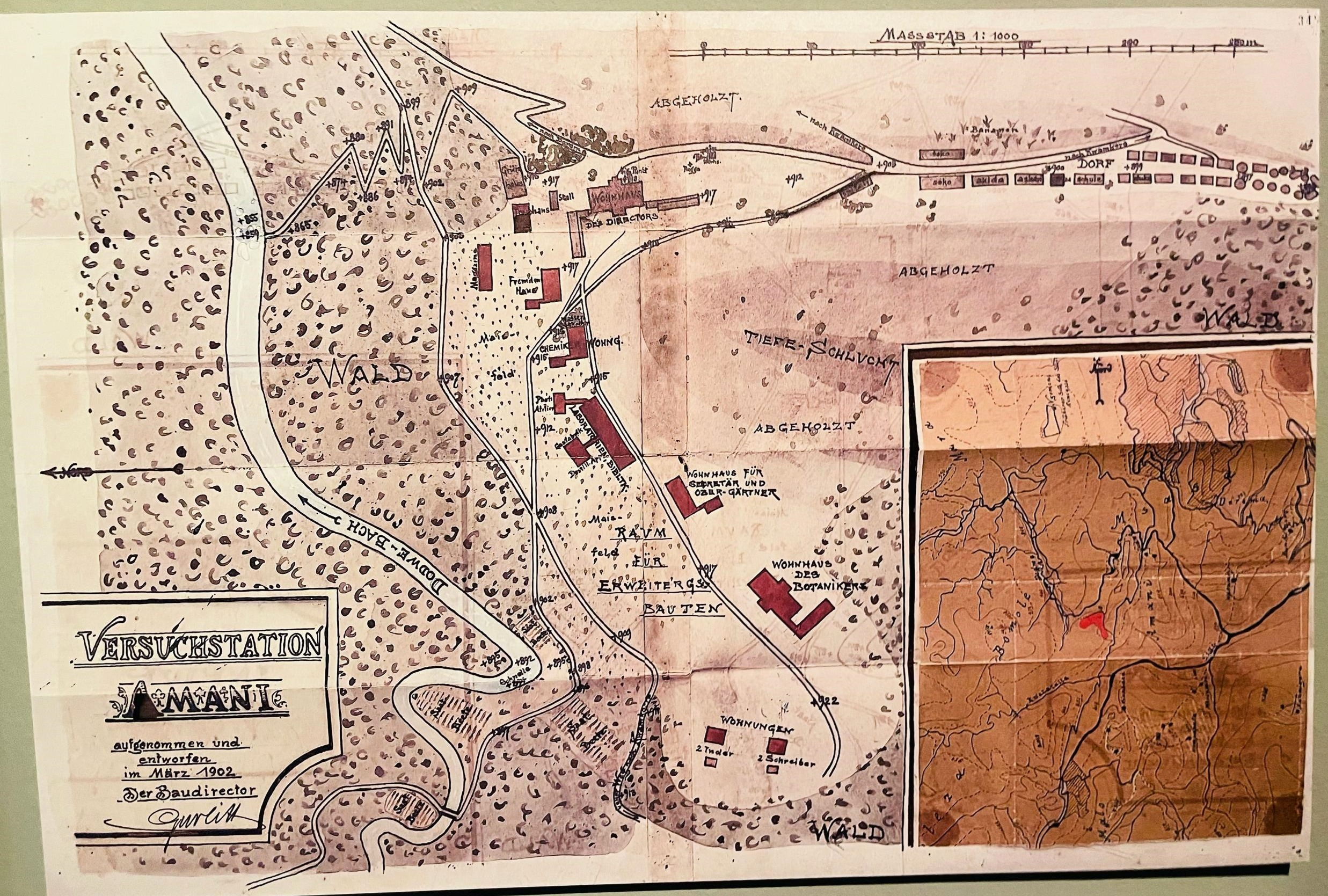
Early plan for Amani research station, 1902

The forerunner of the Amani institute was an agricultural test station at Kwai, which had been set up in the Usambara mountains in the former colony of German East Africa since 1896. "Although Amani was the most famous of Germany's colonial research stations, representing a 2-million-mark investment, it was only one of several German agricultural stations in the northern region. Another, named Kwai farm and located in the nearby West Usambaras, preceded Amani as the colony's chief center for agricultural and livestock experiments. Kwai lacked Amani's international reputation, but it nonetheless held a prominent place in the minds of the Africans who lived in its shadow."

The Kwai experimental station soon became state owned, and was finally sold to the long-term lease-holder, Ludwig Illich. As early as 1890, Richard Hindorf had promoted the idea of a research station in German East Africa along the models of other similar stations in British and Dutch colonies. Hindorf was also a co-founder of the Colonial Economic Committee (German: Kolonial-wirtschaftliches Komitee), which passed the resolution in June 1898 in Berlin, "to send a submission to the Reich Chancellor that there is reserved for [...] German East Africa in 1899 a sum of 100,000 Marks with the purpose of the setting up and operation of a research station for tropical cultures in Usambara." The submission was justified by the appended articles by Hindorf “A research station for tropical cultures in Usambara" and Otto Warburg “The need for an experimental station for tropical crops in Usambara and its cost".

With the assistance of the naturalist and zoologist Franz Stuhlmann the project soon got off the ground. In September 1902, the Amani institute was founded in the East Usambara mountains situated in the hinterland of the port city of Tanga at Stuhlmann's suggestion. Work began in 1903 and was directed by the botanist, Albrecht Zimmermann, before the botanist Karl Braun took over as head, only to be succeeded later again by Zimmermann. Zimmermann and his staff worked in Amani until 1920, when the British mandated government dismissed them. From 1905 to the end of 1906, Stuhlmann was the director in person at Amani.

The institute, starting out as a biological-agricultural research centre, came to be known as the Amani Biological-Agricultural institute (German: Biologisch-Landwirtschaftliches Institut Amani). It quickly expanded into other areas of research in the following years and soon became a "tropical scientific institute superior to anything in the British colonies and protectorates and comparable with Pusa in India or the Dutch establishment at Buitenzorg in Java."

== Botanical work ==
Stuhlmann introduced the first systematic planting of cinchona bark trees in East Africa, which was to be used for the production of quinine against malaria. He also directed the planting of hundreds of camphor trees in the Usambara from seeds sent to him by Adolf Engler, the renowned plant taxonomist at the then Royal Botanical Museum, Berlin and a professor at the University of Berlin, who had obtained them from Japan. In 1903, Engler also provided hundreds of plant specimens to the institute, including commercially important tropical plants.

Stuhlmann also hired Albrecht Zimmermann, who had worked in Buitenzorg since 1896, for botanical research, and who eventually became director of the institute in 1911. Zimmermann was primarily known as a specialist in coffee cultivation and within a short time he brought the institute international recognition. It soon became the focus of botanical and agricultural research for colonial powers in Africa. Plant physiology, entomology, plant toxicology and the possibility of pest control were all part of the Imperial institute's field of work, as was research into cultivation methods and local plant remedies. Also, fertilization research was carried out in demarcated areas. All microscopes in the institute came from Carl Zeiss in Jena, and glassware was preferred from a factory in Lauscha. Lists of the former state-of-the-art laboratory equipment are held in the National Archives of Tanzania, in Dar es Salaam.

Amani was to become the largest arboretum in the world. Species were introduced from various parts of the world for agricultural trials with varied economic interests. These included medicinal plants (e.g. Cinchona spp.), fruits and spices (e.g. Garcinia spp.), valuable timber (e.g. Cedrela, Eucalyptus), raw material for cosmetics (i.e. Cananga), rubber, fibre, oil (e.g. Hevea) and ornamental plants (e.g. fan palms). In 1914 the Amani library stocked almost 4,000 books and 300 journals. Much of the literature and numerous specimens held at Amani were taken to Berlin in 1918, but in 1943, the Berlin herbarium was hit by a bomb and the material was destroyed.

== Medical research ==
One of the renowned visitors to Amani was Robert Koch, the pathologist and professor of hygiene at the University of Berlin. He also was director of the newly established Institute of Hygiene and from 1891 director of the Institute for Infectious diseases. Koch participated in research carried out at Amani and showed that the seasonal incidence of malaria was highest during the Great Rains when, "for a whole month masses of water lie on much of the land", thus confirming the Kiswahili saying, Hakuna masika yasiyo mbu (There are no rains without mosquitos). He also demonstrated an incubation period of 12 days for this illness. The elevation of the Usambara mountains was crucial for his observation of the absence of malaria above an altitude of 1,300 metres. In December 1904, Koch was sent to German East Africa to study East Coast fever of cattle. He made important observations, not only on this disease, but also on pathogenic species of Babesia and Trypanosoma and on tickborne spirochaetosis, and continued his work on these organisms when he returned home. In 1905, he won the Nobel Prize for Physiology or Medicine for his investigations and discoveries in relation to tuberculosis.

In 1906/7 Robert Koch and his team stayed in Amani and later made an expedition to Uganda as part of their research into African sleeping sickness (African trypanosomiasis). The western area of Tanganyika, in particular near the lakes, had been suffering from an epidemic of sleeping sickness, an illness which also ravaged neighbouring Uganda. Large outbreaks of this disease had occurred in East Africa from 1896 to 1910, and it was widely held by scientists that these were epidemics imported from West Africa or the Congo, rather than being endemic to the region. The first published description of sleeping sickness cases during the 1900-1920 epidemic, in the British Protectorate of East Africa, now Uganda, was made at the Church Missionary Society (CMS) Hospital at Mengo in 1901.^{[cn]}

In 1906/07, Koch also tested the drug atoxyl. Atoxyl was so named by Antoine Béchamp, who synthesised it in 1859 by reacting aniline with arsenic acid, to denote its lesser toxicity when compared to arsenic. In 1906, Paul Ehrlich (1854-1915) and Alfred Bertheim (1879-1914) had discovered the structural formula of atoxyl and Ehrlich's "magic bullet" had raised the possibility of targeted therapy. - In the 21st century, Koch's methods have raised ethical questions about his trials of atoxyl, since the drug had serious side-effects, including blindness, and Koch had used the drug with significantly higher doses than in other tests in Germany.

== World War I ==
During World War I, the Amani institute reinforced its international reputation in research when scientists at the centre developed various products. These included medical and chemical products, made from local material to meet war needs and those of the German settlers and the indigenous African soldiers. Due to a blockade by the British navy, the colony was cut off from the rest of the world and could not import anything: "Considerable ingenuity was shown in producing in the colony manufactured goods and medical supplies normally imported from Europe. Quinine was made at the Amani institute and at Mpwapwa, [...] dye-stuffs were made from native bark. In the first eighteen months of the war the Amani Agricultural Research institute "prepared for use from its own products 16 varieties of foodstuffs and liquors, 11 varieties of spices, 12 varieties of medicines and medicaments, 5 varieties of rubber products, 2 of soap, oils and candles, 3 of materials used in making boats, and 10 miscellaneous substances. Many of these were prepared in comparatively large quantities, e.g. 15,200 bottles of whisky and other alcoholic liquors, 10,252 lb. of chocolate and cocoa, 2,652 parcels of toothpowder, 10,000 pieces of soap, 300 bottles of castor oil etc."

== Post World War I activities ==
Following the German defeat in World War I, the British government took over the administration of Tanganyika, first as mandated by the League of Nations and later as a United Nations trust territory. As the Amani institute had become a renowned research centre, it retained its international reputation. The British scientists were "impressed both with Amani's international reputation and the quality of research conducted there and continued operating it as a research institute under the British postwar government.

The East Africa Commission, founded in 1924, was critical of the neglect of the institution, when it reported that "this world-famous research institution is, for all practical purposes, lying derelict, its laboratories unoccupied, its costly apparatus dismantled, the living quarters deteriorating, the magnificent and priceless collection of books and scientific records and specimens unused."

For malaria research, the institute was transformed in 1949 into the East African Malaria Unit. The research centre served not only Tanganyika, but also Kenya, Uganda, Zanzibar and British Somaliland in the prevention and control of malaria and other vector-borne diseases. It became the East African Malaria institute in 1951 and was renamed the East African institute of Malaria and Vector Borne Diseases in 1954.

== Amani Research Institute since independence ==
According to a 2018 article by the BBC, political, financial, and structural issues, coupled with shifting research agendas, led to the decline of Amani and similar research stations across Africa since the 1960s. This is similar to broader global issues affecting scientific progress, including inadequate funding, political instability, and reliance on foreign donors. According to a project by Paul Wenzel Geissler, a professor of social anthropology at the University of Oslo, the story of Amani underscores the importance of valuing basic scientific research and maintaining infrastructure to prevent the decline of research institutions worldwide.

== German-Tanzanian historical research project ==
Since 2019, Karl Braun's collection of historical artefacts and documents from Amani has been researched as part of a German-Tanzanian project and is presented to the public in an exhibition at the municipal museum in Stade in 2025.Presented to the public in an exhibition at the municipal museum in Stade in 2025, this ongoing project is meant as an opportunity to provide new perspectives on Tanzanian and German cultural history as well as its significance in the past and present.

== See also ==
- Medical research institutes
- History of German East Africa
- History of Tanganyika
