= Culture of Tanzania =

Following Tanganyika's independence (1961) and unification with Zanzibar (1964), leading to the formation of the state of Tanzania, President Julius Nyerere emphasised a need to construct a national identity for the citizens of the new country. To achieve this, Nyerere provided what has been regarded by some commentators as one of the most successful cases of ethnic repression and identity transformation in Africa.

With over 130 ethnic groups and local languages spoken, Tanzania is one of the most ethnically diverse countries in Africa. Despite this, ethnic divisions have remained rare in Tanzania, especially when compared to the rest of the continent.

== Natural history ==
The territory of Tanzania is home to some of the world's important archaeological excavations and their scientific interpretation:

=== Olduvai Gorge ===
The Olduvai Gorge is one of the most important paleoanthropological localities in the world; the many sites exposed by the gorge have proven invaluable in furthering understanding of early human evolution. A steep-sided ravine in the Great Rift Valley that stretches across East Africa, it is about 48 km (30 mi) long, and is located in the eastern Serengeti Plains within the Ngorongoro Conservation Area in the Olbalbal ward located in Ngorongoro District of Arusha Region, about 45 kilometres (28 miles) from Laetoli, another important archaeological locality of early human occupation. The British/Kenyan paleoanthropologist-archeologist team of Mary and Louis Leakey established excavation and research programs at Olduvai Gorge that achieved great advances in human knowledge and are world-renowned.

In July 2019, the Olduvai Gorge Monument was erected at the turnoff to Olduvai Gorge from the road which connects Ngorongoro Conservation Area and Serengeti National Park (a route traveled by safari-goers). Eng. Joshua Mwankunda conceived the idea of erecting a monument to commemorate this significant site while also serving as a signpost and attracting visitors to the Olduvai Gorge and museum; paleoanthropologists Nicholas Toth, Kathy Schick, and Jackson Njau planned and provided life-size fossil casts at the request of the Tanzanian government, which were used by the Tanzanian artist Festo Kijo to create the two large concrete skulls. The monument consists of two large-scale models of fossil skulls which sit atop a large pedestal with an informative plaque mounted on the side of the pedestal. The fossil skulls depicted are Paranthropus boisei and Homo habilis, two contemporary species which were first discovered at Olduvai Gorge. The large-scale models created by Kijo are each 6 feet tall and weigh 5,000 pounds. The monument project was funded by the Stone Age Institute and the John Templeton Foundation, in partnership with the Ngorongoro Conservation Area Authority (NCAA).

The Olduvai Gorge Museum, located 5 km beyond the monument, is situated on the rim of the gorge at the junction of the main gorge and the side gorge. As one of the largest onsite museums in Africa, the museum provides educational exhibits related to the gorge and its long history.

=== Tendaguru excavations ===
The Tendaguru Formation northwest of Lindi is considered the richest Late Jurassic strata in Africa. The formation has provided a wealth of fossils of different groups; early mammaliaforms, several genera of dinosaurs, crocodyliforms, amphibians, fish, invertebrates and flora. More than 250 tonnes (250 long tons; 280 short tons) of material was shipped to the Museum of Natural History in Berlin, Germany, during excavations in the early twentieth century.

The Tendaguru Beds as a fossil deposit were first discovered in 1906, when German pharmacist, chemical analyst and mining engineer Bernhard Wilhelm Sattler, on his way to a mine south of the Mbemkure River in former German East Africa, was shown by his local staff enormous bones weathering out of the path near the base of Tendaguru Hill, 10 kilometres (6.2 mi) south of Mtapaia (close to Nambiranji village, Mipingo ward, 60 kilometres (37 mi) northwest of Lindi town).

In 1998, an illustrated book in Swahili, whose title translates as Dinosaurs of Tendaguru, was published for young readers in East Africa. It presents a slightly different, fictitious story of the first discovery, which is attributed to a Tanzanian farmer, rather than to the German engineer Sattler.

=== Rock art formations ===
In February 2021, Polish archaeologists from Jagiellonian University announced the discovery of ancient rock art with anthropomorphic figures in a good condition at the Amak'hee 4 rockshelter site in Swaga Swaga Game Reserve in northwest Dodoma Region. Paintings made with a reddish dye also contained buffalo heads, giraffe's head and neck, domesticated cattle dated back to about several hundred years ago. Archaeologists estimated that these paintings can describe a ritual of the Sandawe people, although their present religion does not contain elements of anthropomorphization of buffaloes.

== Languages ==
A total of 130 languages are spoken in Tanzania; most of them are from the Bantu family. Swahili and English are the two official languages of Tanzania. However, Swahili is the national language.

Given the conditions of the period, it was not possible to introduce Swahili in the entire educational system, because the scale of the task of writing or translating textbooks for primary schools was already considerable. As a result, English, the colonial language since the end of World War I, is still the language of high schools and universities. Many students leave school after finishing primary education.

Although the many non-official languages in Tanzania are not actively suppressed, they do not enjoy the same linguistic rights as Swahili and English. Some also face language extinction, such as the Kw'adza language that is not spoken any longer.

== Literature ==
Tanzania's literary culture is primarily oral. Major oral literary forms include folktales, poems, riddles, proverbs, and songs. The greatest part of Tanzania's recorded oral literature is in Swahili, even though each of the country's languages has its own oral tradition. The country's oral literature has been declining because of the breakdown of the multigenerational social structure, making transmission of oral literature more difficult, and because increasing modernization has been accompanied by the devaluation of oral literature.

Books in Tanzania are often expensive and hard to come by. Most Tanzanian literature is in Swahili or, less often, in English. Major figures in Tanzanian written literature include Shaaban Robert (considered the father of Swahili literature), Aniceti Kitereza, Muhammed Saley Farsy, Faraji Katalambulla, Adam Shafi Adam, Muhammed Said Abdalla, Said Ahmed Mohammed Khamis, Mohamed Suleiman Mohamed, Euphrase Kezilahabi, Gabriel Ruhumbika, Ebrahim Hussein, May Materru Balisidya, Fadhy Mtanga, Amandina Lihamba and Penina O. Mlama and British nobel laureate of Zanzibari origin Abdulrazak Gurnah.

== Media ==
From independence until 1993, all recording and distribution of music was strictly managed by BASATA, primarily through Radio Tanzania Dar es Salaam (RTD). Only the 4 Tanzanian genres were permitted to be recorded or broadcast, which at the time was ngoma, taarab, kwaya and dansi. The Broadcasting Services Act of 1993 allows private broadcast networks and recording studios.

== Music ==
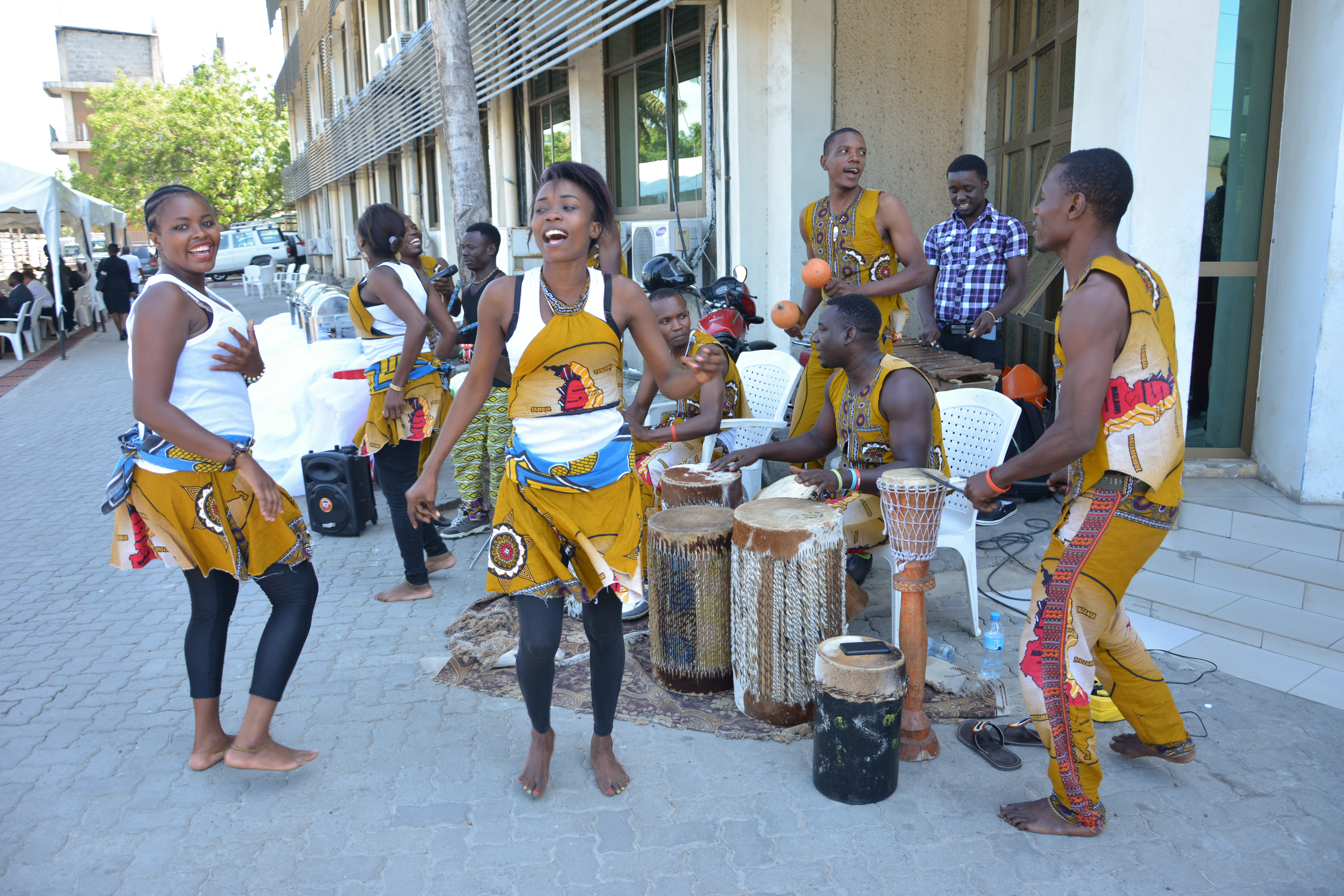
Tanzanian Ngoma group

As in other countries, music in Tanzania is constantly undergoing changes, and varies by location, people, settings and occasion. The five music genres in Tanzania, as defined by BASATA are, ngoma, dansi, kwaya, and taarab, with bongo flava added in 2001. Singeli has since the mid-2000's been an unofficial music of uswahilini, unplanned communities in Dar es Salaam, and is the newest mainstream genre since 2020.

Ngoma, a Bantu word, meaning dance, drum and event is a traditional dance music that has been the most widespread music in Tanzania. Dansi is urban jazz or band music. Taarab is sung Kiswahili poetry accompanied by a band, typically with strings and percussion, in which the audience is often, but not always, encouraged to dance and clap. Kwaya is choir music originally limited to church services during colonization, but now a secular part of education, social, and political events.

Bongo flava is Tanzanian pop music originating in the early 2000s from muziki wa kizazi kipya, meaning "Music of the new generation", which originated in the late 1980s. Kizazi kipya's dominant influences were reggae, RnB, and hip hop, whereas the later bongo flava's dominant influences are taarab and dansi. Three recent influences on bongo flava are Afropop in the 2010s, as well as amapiano from South Africa and singeli from Tanzania, both since 2020. Singeli is a ngoma music style that originated in Manzese, a uswahilini in north-west Dar es Salaam. An MC performs over fast tempo taarab music, often at between 200 and 300 beats per minute (BPM) while women dance. Styles differ significantly between MC genders. Male MCs usually perform in fast-paced rap, while female MCs usually perform kwaya.

In the few years prior to 1993, hip hop had been established in Dar es Salaam, Arusha and Mwanza. It was transitioning from English performances of hip hop originating in uzunguni, rich areas like Oysterbay and Msasaki with international schools, to Kiswahili performances of kizazi kipya, originating in uswahilini Following airtime on radio waves, bongo flava spread throughout the country, and the rest of the Great Lakes.

=== National anthem ===
Mungu ibariki Afrika
National Anthem of Tanzania
National Anthem of Tanzania performed by United States Navy Band

The Tanzanian national anthem is Mungu Ibariki Africa (God Bless Africa), composed by South African composer Enoch Sontonga in 1897. The tune is the ANC's official song and later became the national anthem of South Africa. The melody is also the national anthem of Zambia. In Tanzania, Swahili lyrics were written for this anthem. – Another patriotic song, going back to colonial times, is Tanzania, Tanzania.

=== Music industry ===
The music industry in Tanzania has seen many changes in the past ten years. With a fusion of local and foreign music traditions, Tanzanian musicians have grown in prominence within the African Great Lakes region. It includes artists from traditional music, such as Dionys Mbilinyi, Sabinus Komba, and many others, to new artists in R&B, pop, Zouk, Taarab, and dance.

Imani Sanga is a composer, ethnomusicologist, church organist, and choral conductor.

Mwakisinini Felix is a music artist who contributed a lot to church music as a composer, trainer, and choral conductor.

== Visual arts ==
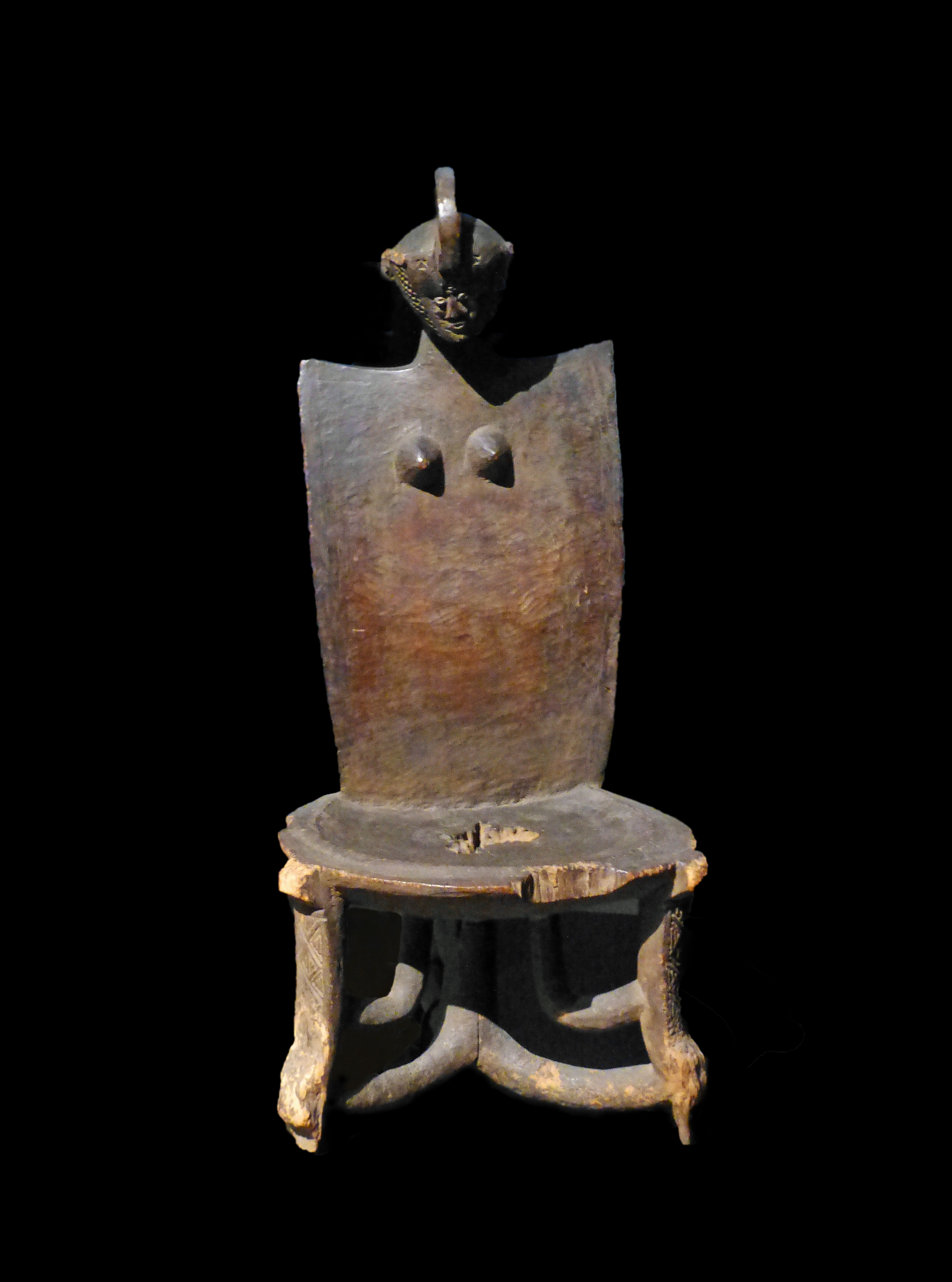
High-backed stool, Kami ethnic group, late 19th century, Musée des Confluences, Lyon

After independence, Tanzania set up new government institutions, including ones focused on art, education in the arts and related policies. A number of professionally trained artists, mostly alumni of Makerere College, such as Elias Jengo and Sam Ntiro took on official roles within these administrations.

=== Traditional sculpture ===
In the course of their long history, the more than 130 ethnic groups living in mainland Tanzania and on the islands of Zanzibar have created numerous cultural objects, used either for practical purposes of everyday life or for use in rituals and as indicators of social status. Such cultural objects have been collected since mainly the late 19th century by private individuals and ethnographic museums in Europe, later followed by museums in various other countries, including the Dar es Salaam National Museum. Following the appreciation of African traditional applied arts by Western artists, collectors and art exhibitions since the 1920s, such objects have been seen as cultural artifacts.

From the 1930s to 1950s, anthropologist Hans Cory collected about 1000 clay figurines used for initiation rites in different ethnic groups. He published these in his works, most notably in African figurines: their ceremonial use in puberty rites in Tanganyika. According to German ethnologist Elisabeth Grohs, who studied puberty ceremonies and the use of figurines in Tanzania in the 1960s, Cory donated a large number of these figurines at the end of his life to the Dar es Salaam National Museum.

=== Major exhibitions ===
Tanzania. Masterworks of African Sculpture was a 1994 art exhibition of traditional African sculptures originating from the mainland region of modern Tanzania. Shown in Berlin and Munich, Germany, more than 400 historical sculptures and masks had been selected for this exhibition. Some of the cultural objects on display came from German museums, while others were provided by private collectors from Europe, the USA and Africa. The 528-page, large-format exhibition catalogue contains contributions by European and American ethnologists, art historians and collectors on aspects of traditional sculptural art from Tanganyika. More than 500 black-and-white photographs of sculptures and masks from public and private collections as well as maps, illustrations and a bibliography complement the individual chapters.

In 2013, QCC Art Gallery of the City University of New York (CUNY) and Portland Museum of Art, USA, presented Shangaa: Art of Tanzania, the first major show of traditional art from Tanzania outside of Germany and Tanzania. The exhibition curator, art historian Gary van Wyck, edited a catalogue with numerous illustrations and contributions by Tanzanian and international scholars.

=== Modern sculpture ===
Tanzanian craftsmen and artists of different ethnic groups have created a rich legacy of sculptures, representing people, animals or practical items of everyday use. Best known of these different ethnic traditions are the modern Makonde carvings of surrealist shetani figures, made out of extremely hard ebony (mapingo) wood. Apart from being a painter, George Lilanga, who died in 2005, is one of the most well-known African modern Makonde sculptors.

=== Painting ===
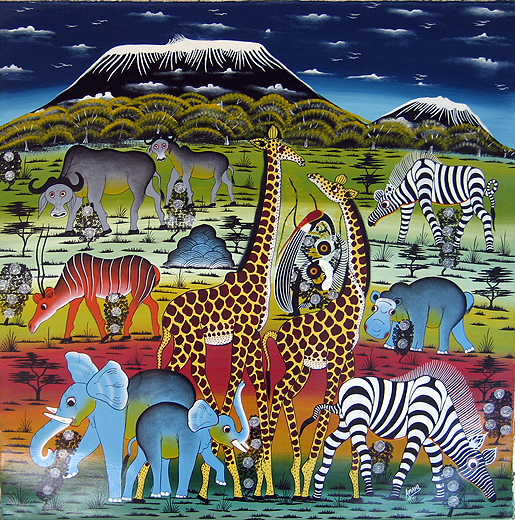
A Tingatinga painting

In 2021 Elias Jengo, Tanzanian painter and associate professor in Fine Art at the Department of Creative Arts at the University of Dar es Salaam, published an overview on "The Making of Contemporary Art in Tanzania." Referring to the early years after independence, Jengo described the absence of an official political orientation for the arts by the Nyerere government. With regard to the development of visual and applied arts, he discussed organizations including the National Handicraft Marketing Development Corporation (HANDICO) and its subsidiaries, the National Arts Council, the Tanzania Culture Trust Fund, the Copyright Society of Tanzania (COSOTA), the role of art galleries, foundations and associations. Further, Jengo wrote about modern Makonde sculpture, the so-called Tingatinga school as well as fine-art paintings by Sam Ntiro and other contemporary painters.

Tingatinga is the name applied to a popular genre of Tanzanian paintings, which are painted with enamel paints on hardboard or canvas. Usually, the motifs are animals and flowers in colorful and repetitive design. The style was started by Edward Saidi Tingatinga in Dar es Salaam. Since his death in 1972, the Tingatinga style expanded both in Tanzania and abroad.

Contemporary Tanzanian artists include David Mzuguno, Haji Chilonga, Salum Kambi, Max Kamundi, Thobias Minzi, Robino Ntila, John Kilaka, Godfrey Semwaiko, Evarist Chikawe, and others.

=== Cartoons ===
Tanzania's cartoons have a history that can be traced back to the work of pioneering artists, such as Christian Gregory with his Chakubanga cartoons in the Uhuru newspaper back in the 1970s and 1980s, and Philip Ndunguru in the early 1980s. Outspokenly political cartoons were created on a more recent date.

In the past decade, the art of cartoons and comics has really taken off in Tanzania. At the present date, there are dozens of cartoonists, some of whom are well known throughout the country. From the 1960s and so on, a number of artists prepared the way, and their names are cited by today's artists as essential influences. Some of these known cartoonists in Tanzania include Ally Masoud 'kipanya', Sammi Mwamkinga, Nathan Mpangala 'Kijasti', King kinya, Adam Lutta, Fred Halla, James Gayo, Robert Mwampembwa, Francis Bonda, Popa Matumula, Noah Yongolo, Oscar Makoye, Fadhili Mohamed, and many others (see the history of cartoons in Tanzania at the Worldcomics website: http://www.worldcomics.fi)

== Sports ==
National Stadium in Dar es Salaam.

Football is very popular throughout the country. The most popular professional football clubs in Dar es Salaam are the Young Africans F.C. and Simba S.C. The Tanzania Football Federation is the governing body for football in the country.

Other popular sports include basketball, netball, boxing, volleyball, athletics, and rugby. The National Sports Council also known as Baraza la Michezo la Taifa is the governing body for sports in the country under the Ministry of Information, Youth, Sports and Culture.

== Cuisine ==
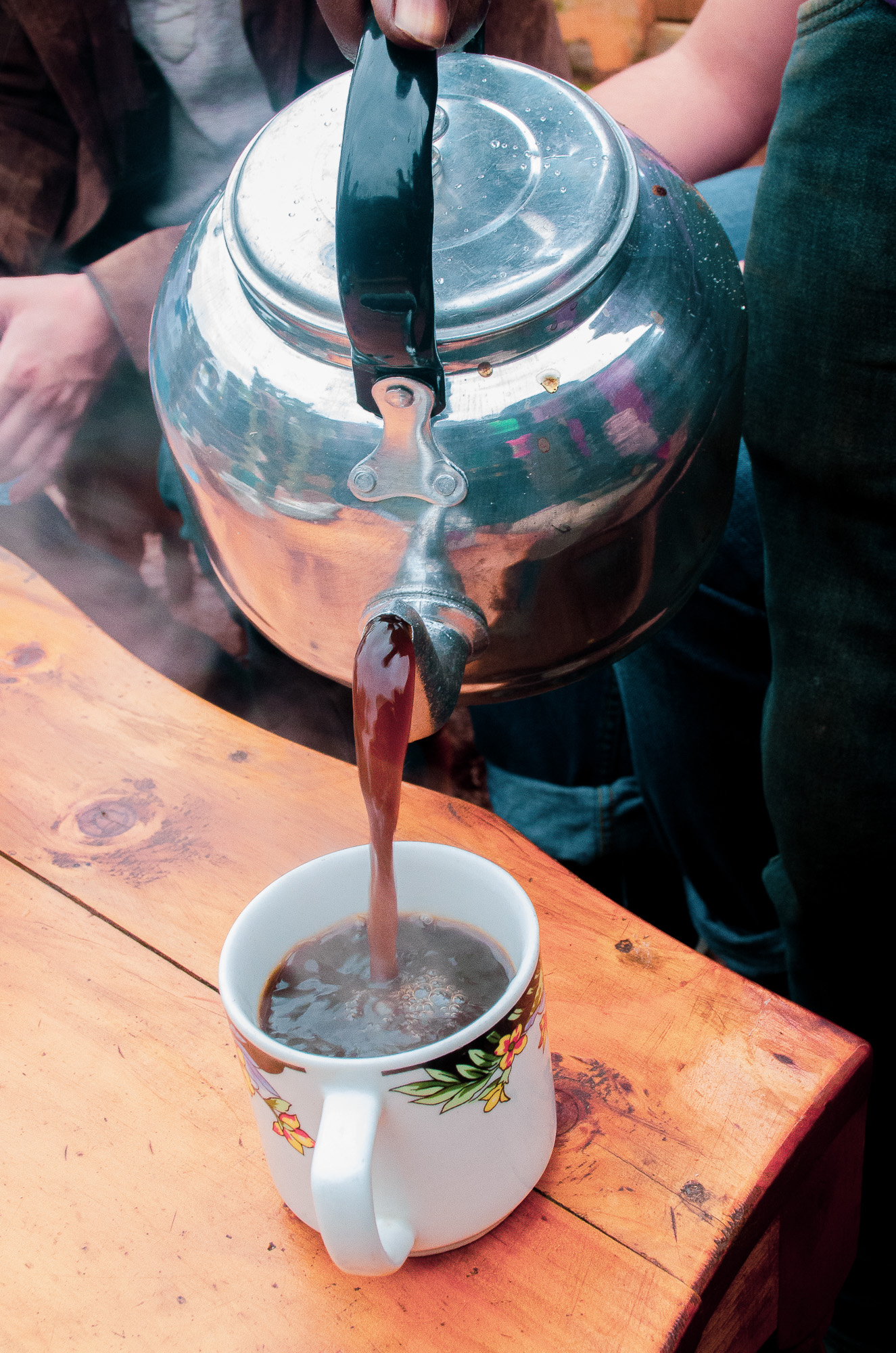
Lemon and ginger tea

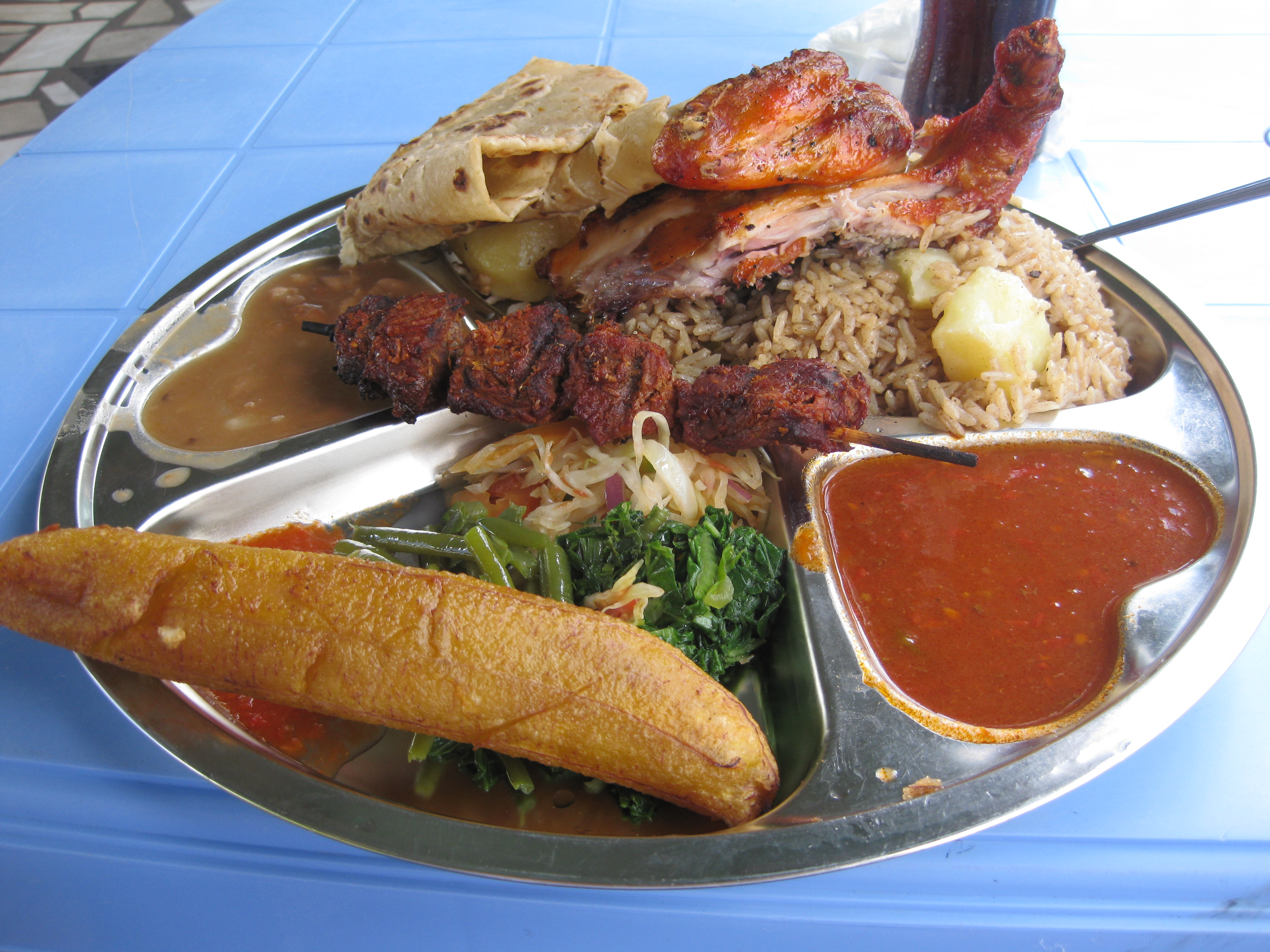
Traditional Tanzanian food consisting of pilau kuku (seasoned rice with chicken), mishkaki (grilled meat), ndizi (plantain), maharage (beans), mboga (vegetables), chapati (flatbread) and pili pili (hot sauce)

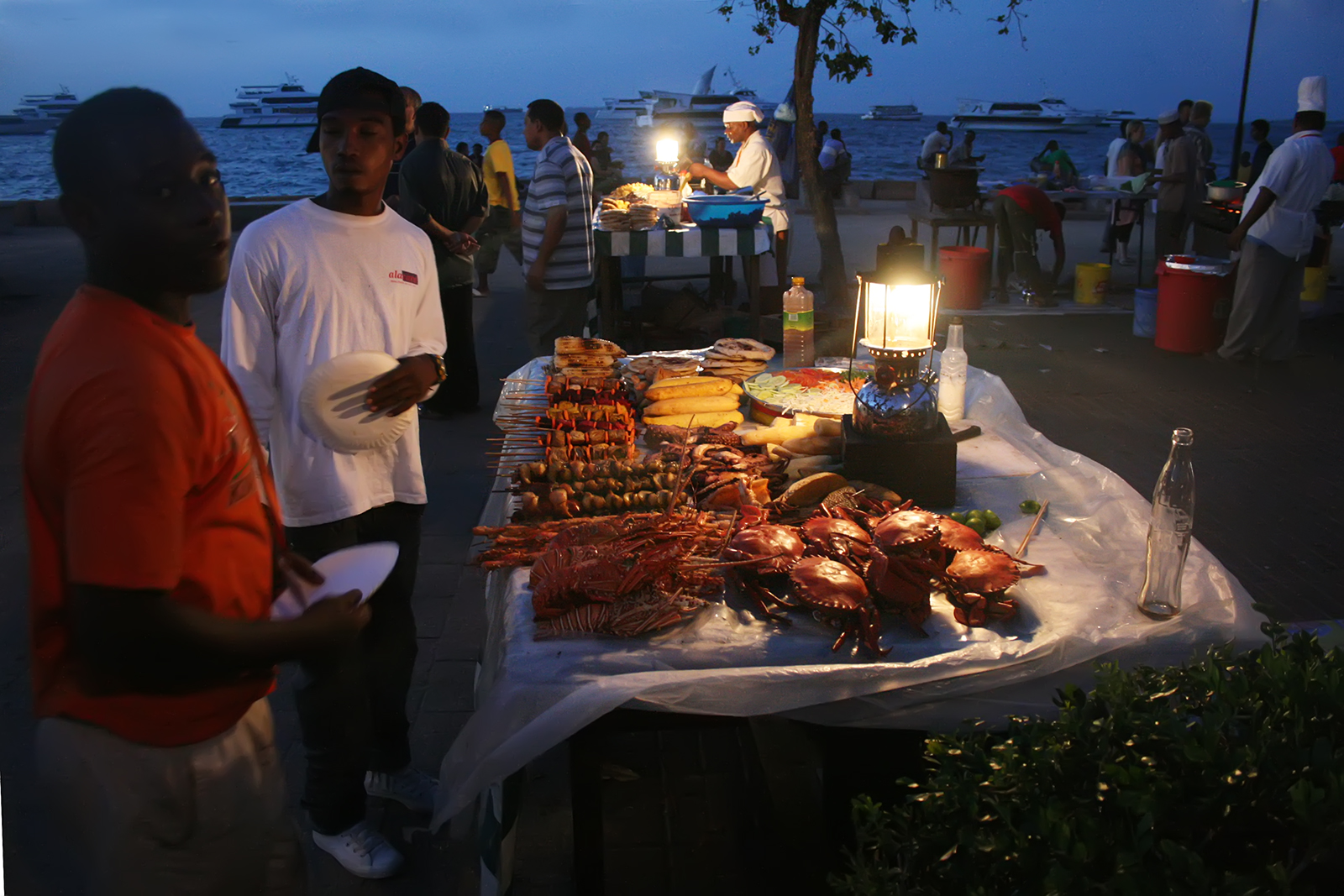
Barbecued beef cubes and seafood in Forodhani Gardens, Zanzibar

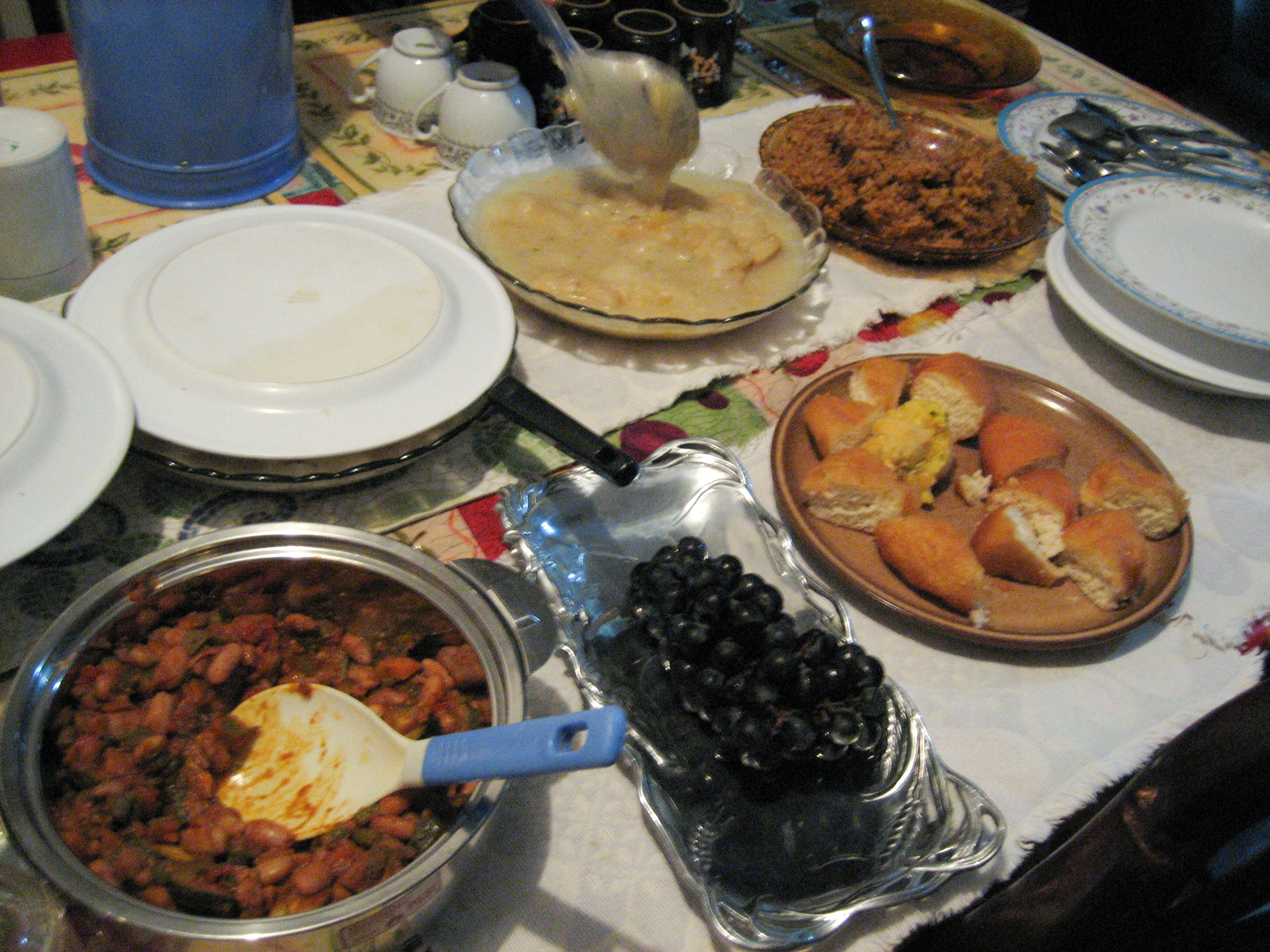
A Ramadan dinner in Tanzania

Tanzanian cuisine varies by geographical region. Along the coastal regions (Dar es Salaam, Tanga, Bagamoyo, Zanzibar, and Pemba), spicy foods are common, and there is also much use of coconut milk.

Regions in Tanzania's mainland consume different foods. Some typical mainland Tanzanian foods include wali (rice), ugali (maize porridge), nyama choma (grilled meat), mishkaki (skewers of marinated grilled beef), samaki (fish, usually tilapia), pilau (rice mixed with a variety of spices), biriyani, and ndizi-nyama (plantains with meat).

Vegetables commonly used in Tanzania include bamia (okra) which is mostly eaten as a stew or prepared into traditional stew called mlenda, mchicha (amaranthus tricolor), njegere (green peas), maharage (beans), and kisamvu (cassava leaves). Tanzania grows at least 17 different types of bananas which are used for soup, stew, and chips.

Some breakfast foods typically seen in Tanzania are maandazi (fried doughnut), chai (tea), chapati (a kind of flat bread), porridge, and especially in rural areas chipsi mayai.

Tanzanian snack foods include visheti, kashata (coconut bars), kabaab (kebab), sambusa (samosa), mkate wa kumimina (Zanzibari rice bread), vileja, vitumbua (rice patties), and bagia.

Since a large community of Indians have migrated into Tanzania, a considerable proportion of the cuisine has been influenced by Indian cuisine.

== See also ==
- Religion in Tanzania
- List of African cuisines
