= List of Tanzanian artists =

The following list of Tanzanian artists (in alphabetical order by last name) includes artists of various genres, who are notable and are either born in Tanzania, of Tanzanian descent or who produce works that are primarily about Tanzania.

== K ==
- John Kilaka (born 1966) children's book illustrator and author

== L ==
- George Lilanga (1934–2005), painter and sculptor, of Makonde ethnicity

== M ==
- Sungi Mlengeya (born 1991), self-taught painter focused on minimalistic portraits
- Simon Mpata (1942–1984), painter of the Tingatinga school; he lived in Nairobi

== N ==
- Everlyn Nicodemus (born 1954), artist, writer, and curator

== T ==
- Edward Tingatinga (1932–1972), painter

== J ==
- Jay Melody (born 1997), singer, songwriter

== D ==
- Diamond Platnumz (born 1989), musician, dancer

== H ==
- Harmonize (1994), singer-songwriter

== R ==
- Rayvanny (1993), musician

== See also ==
- List of Tanzanian Americans
- Tanzanian culture
- Tingatinga (painting)
- Makonde art
