= Elias Jengo =

Tanzanian painter and art educator, born 1936

- Born: 27 May 1936 (age 90); Tanga, Tanganyika Territory
- Education: Makerere University, Uganda, Kent State University, USA
- Known for: Modern African painting
- Website: Elias Jengo website

Elias Eliezar Jengo (born 27 May 1936) is a Tanzanian painter, retired professor of Fine Art at the Department of Creative Arts of the University of Dar es Salaam and scholar of art history.

== Life and career ==
Jengo was born in 1936 in what was then the British mandate Tanganyika Territory. From 1945 to 1955, Jengo attended Tanga Secondary School, and then he studied at the Mpwapwa Teacher Training Centre in Dodoma region from 1956 to 1957. Following this, Jengo studied Fine Art and Art Education from 1959 to 1963 at Makerere University, Uganda, and from 1964 to 1965 at Kent State University, Ohio, United States. After attending Sir George Williams University – now Concordia University – in Montreal, Canada, he obtained a further degree in Educational Technology. Together with Sam Joseph Ntiro, Jengo founded the University of Dar es Salaam's Department of Fine and Performing Arts in 1969. He acted as professor at this department until his retirement after almost three decades in 1996.

Some of the courses Jengo taught include drawing, painting, the history of modern African art as well as general art history. Further, Jengo is known for his writing and activities in national and international arts organizations. As one of Tanzania's best-known painters, Jengo has exhibited at home and abroad. His canvases have featured semi-abstract figurative scenes, rendered in carefully curated palettes. His repertoire encompasses a range of subjects, from the universal to the socio-political, including scenes from the lives of African women and environmental concerns.

=== Selected publications ===
In 2021, Jengo published an overview on "The Making of Contemporary Art in Tanzania." Referring to the early years after independence, he described the absence of an official political orientation for the arts by the Nyerere government. With regard to the development of visual and applied arts, Jengo discussed organizations including the National Handicraft Marketing Development Corporation (HANDICO) and its subsidiaries, the National Arts Council of Tanzania, the Tanzania Culture Trust Fund, the Copyright Society of Tanzania (COSOTA), and the role of art galleries, foundations and associations. Further, he described modern Makonde sculpture, the so-called Tingatinga school as well as fine-art paintings by Sam Ntiro and other contemporary Tanzanian painters. In 2014, Jengo co-edited a book titled in Swahili Falsafa ya Sanaa Tanzania about philosophical approaches to Tanzanian fine art.

=== Professional affiliation ===
- Chairman, National Arts Council of Tanzania
- 2008: Founding Board Chairman, Nafasi Art Space, Dar es Salaam
- 2003: Chairman, East Africa Biennale Association
- 1999: Chairman, Members of the State House Art Committee

== Awards and distinctions ==
- Fulbright Fellowship as Scholar in Residence at the Stark College campus of Kent State University from September 2004 to June 2005.

== Reception ==
In 2009, Juma Swafi completed his Master's thesis at the University of Dar es Salaam titled "Contemporary art in Tanzania: a study of the artworks of Elias Jengo." Intended as the first detailed study of the painter's images and themes as well as their relation to Jengo's biography, it stated that the background of his artworks is "based on religion, mythology, nationalism and politics."

In 2014, Imani Sanga, a scholar and musicologist at the University of Dar es Salaam, published his study about how music is represented in selected paintings by Elias Jengo. Sanga identified recurring musical elements in these paintings that express African and Tanzanian traditions and identity. The article also elaborated on Jengo's influence on his students and other young artists in Tanzania. It argued that the long-lasting importance of Jengo's work is not only apparent in his guiding example for these young artists, but also in his students’ eagerness to be inspired by Jengo's African themes.

Jengo and other artists from Tanzania have been repeatedly invited to Germany, where he also had several exhibitions of his paintings. The German-Tanzanian friendship society published an article about the art of Elias Jengo on their website.

Jengo's paintings can be found in the collections of the University of Waterloo, Canada, the Makerere University in Kampala, as well as in private collections in Tanzania and Germany. Further, Jengo's paintings have been sold by international auction houses such as Sotheby's and Circle Art Gallery in Nairobi.

== See also ==
- Culture of Tanzania - Painting
- Contemporary African art
