= Shelley Tanaka =

Canadian children's writer and book editor

- Born: Toronto, Ontario
- Occupations: Editor, writer, translator, writing teacher
- Writing career
- Period: 1980s–present
- Genres: Children's literature, non-fiction

Shelley Tanaka is a Canadian editor of numerous young adult novels, an author of non-fiction for children, a translator, and a writing teacher.

== Biography ==
Shelley Tanaka was born in Toronto, Ontario, Canada. She received an Honours bachelor's degree in English and German from Queen's University, and a master's degree in Comparative Literature from the University of Toronto. She lives in Kingston, Ontario, Canada.

Tanaka began her editing career at Clarke Irwin. She has been the fiction editor at Groundwood Books, a Canadian children's book publisher, since 1983 and has edited books by many Canadian writers, including Tim Wynne-Jones, Deborah Ellis, Martha Brooks, Sarah Ellis and Alan Cumyn. She is the editor of thirteen Governor General's Award winning books.

Shelley Tanaka writes nonfiction for children, including books in the I Was There series and A Day That Changed America series. She has won numerous awards for her writing, among them the Orbis Pictus Award in 2009. Her books have been translated into several languages: German, Danish, Spanish, French, Japanese, Portuguese and Thai. Additionally, she has translated many children's picture books and novels from German and French into English.

Tanaka teaches in the MFA in Writing for Children and Young Adults program at Vermont College of Fine Arts.

== Awards ==
- Amelia Earhart: The Legend of the Lost Aviator won the Orbis Pictus Award in 2009.
- Translation of Good for Nothing by Michel Noël was on the IBBY Honour List for translation in 2006.
- Secrets of the Mummies won the Science in Society Children's Book Award in 2000.
- Discovering the Iceman won the Mr. Christie's Book Award in 1997.
- On Board the Titanic won the Silver Birch Award in 1997.
- The Buried City of Pompei won the Information Book Award in 1997.
- On Board the Titanic won the Information Book Award in 1996.
- On Board the Titanic and The Buried City of Pompeii were finalists for the Deutscher Jugendliteraturpreis.

== Bibliography ==
=== Novels ===
- Nobody Knows, Novelization of the Japanese film by Hirokazu Kore-eda (2012)

=== Historical events ===
- Earthquake! (2004)
- Gettysburg (2003)
- D-Day (2003)
- The Alamo (2003)
- Attack on Pearl Harbor (2001)
- Lost Temple of the Aztecs (1998)
- The Buried City of Pompeii (1996)
- On Board the Titanic (1996)
- The Disaster of the Hindenburg (1993

=== Biographies ===
- Amelia Earhart: The Legend of the Lost Aviator (2008)
- In the Time of Knights (2000)
- One More Border: The True Story of One Family’s Escape from War-Torn Europe, co-written with William Kaplan (1998)

=== Arts ===
- Footnotes: Dancing the World's Best-Loved Ballets, co-written with Frank Augustyn (2001)

=== Environment ===
- Climate Change (2006)
- A Great Round Wonder: My Book of the World (1991)
- The Heat Is On: Facing Our Energy Problem (1991)

=== Archaeology ===
- Mummies: The Newest, Coolest & Creepiest from Around the World (2005)
- New Dinos (2003)
- Secrets of the Mummies (1999)
- Graveyards of the Dinosaurs (1998)
- Discovering the Iceman (1996)

=== Fiction ===
- "Ghost Town" a short story in Dear Canada – Hoping for Home: Stories of Arrival (2011)

=== Earlier works ===
- Anne of Green Gables by L. M. Montgomery, adapted for young readers (1998)
- The Illustrated Father Goose (1995)
- Mr. Dressup's Birthday Party Book (1988)
- Mr. Dressup's 50 More Things to Make and Do, written with Ernie Coombs (1984, 1991)
- Mr. Dressup's Things to Make and Do, written with Ernie Coombs (1982, 1991)
- Michi's New Year (1980)

=== Books translated into English by Shelley Tanaka ===
French

- The Birthday Party by Michel Aubin (1987)
- The Secret Code by Michel Aubin (1987)
- Himalaya by Tenzing Norbu Lama (2002)
- Secret of the Snow Leopard by Tenzing Norbu Lama (2004)
- Good for Nothing by Michel Nöel (2004)
- Broken Memory by Élisabeth Combres (2009)
- Grandfather and the Moon by Stéphanie Lapointe (2017)

German

- The Fire: An Ethiopian Folk Tale by Heinz Janisch (Groundwood Books, 2002)
- True Friends: Tales from Tanzania by John Kilaka (Groundwood, 2006), picture book OCLC 61300807
- Girl from Mars by Tamara Bach (Groundwood, 2009)
- Definitely Not for Little Ones: Some Very Grimm Fairy Tale Comics by Rotraut Susanne Berner (Groundwood, 2009)
- Hound and Hare by Rotraut Susannne Berner (Groundwood, 2011)
