= Sarah Nyendwoha Ntiro =

Ugandan educator, academic and activist (1926 –2018)

- Born: Sarah Nyendwoha; March 21, 1926; Hoima, Uganda
- Died: October 22, 2018 (aged 92); Kampala, Uganda
- Education: Kings College Budo (Primary Leaving Examination) (High School Diploma); Makerere College (Diploma in Education); University of Oxford (Bachelor of Arts in History); Spelman College (Honorary Doctorate)
- Occupations: Educator, academic, and activist
- Years active: 1954–1990
- Title: Doctor
- Spouse: Sam Joseph Ntiro (m. 1958–1993)

Sarah Nyendwoha Ntiro (21 March 1926 – 22 October 2018) was a Ugandan educator, activist and academic. She was the first woman university graduate in East and Central Africa from Oxford University with a Bachelor of Arts (Hon) in History in 1954.

== Background and education ==
She was born in Hoima to Erasto B. Nyendwoha Akiiki of the Bakwonga clan and Jane Nsungwa Nyendwoha Adyeri, from the Babiito clan, in 1925. Both her parents were teachers. Sarah started school in kindergarten class at Duhaga Girls' School in Hoima where she studied up to Primary 4. In 1938, she joined King's College Budo, where she studied for eight years, from Primary 5 to Secondary 6 (1938–1945). At the end of these years, she sat the Makerere College entrance examinations and was admitted to Makerere College to train as a teacher. She finished three years, doing history, geography, English and teacher training. She was denied the opportunity to study Mathematics because the Maths Tutor said he did not teach girls.

She did her teaching practice at King's College Budo and Kyebambe Girls’ School and later received a teaching certificate. In 1951, she joined Oxford University where graduated with a bachelor's degree in history in 1954. She was the first East and Central African woman to graduate from Oxford University at a time when no tertiary institutions granted degrees in East Africa. While at Makerere University she served on the Boardof Directors of the East African Posts & Telecommunications Corporation that brought satellite communication to East Africa. She chaired the conditions of service Commission of the Church of Uganda that defines theconditions of service of the Church of Uganda to this very day. She lived in exile in Kenya from 1978 until 1986.From 1978 to 1980 she was the Conference Officer for the African Refugee Conference of the All Africa Conference of Churches. In 1981 she was the East Africa Representative for the World University Service. From 1982 to 1986 she was the managing director of Afrecon Services, an Educational Consultancy that provided refugees from East Africa the opportunity to acquire or further their Secondary and Tertiary Education in East Africa and abroad. She returned to Uganda in1986toserve as Director of Aid Co-ordination in the Office of the Prime Minister. She was transferred to the Office of the Vice President in1991 where she served as Head of the Unit that monitored Social Services. She was a Member of the delegation that represented Uganda at the World Conference on Women in Beijing China in 1995. She retired from full time Government Service in 1996. She however served as Vice Chair of NPART, the Non Performing Assets Recovery Trust from 1997 to 2000. She is a Founder Trustee of the Development Network of Indigenous Voluntary Associations (DENIVA). She was part of the team that formed the Tripartite Training Programme TTP, of the three indigenous NGOs DENIVA, URDT (The Uganda Rural Development and Training Programme) and the Women's Activist Organisation, ACFODE ( Action For Development). She was a Director of the Social Service Consultancy MDAHP(Management Development for Health and Population).

== Career ==
Her first working stint was at Kyebambe Girls’ School in Fort Portal. In 1955, she joined Gayaza High School. She later had to leave Gayaza High School and join Duhaga Junior Secondary School (DJSS) in Hoima where she taught for two years before she resigned from active teaching service in 1958.

Sarah's involvement in civil society work started way back while she was at school in the 1940s. For example, when she was at King's College Budo, she was invited by one of her teachers to help teach English to Polish refugees. The teacher was married to the commandant of the refugee camp in Budongo Forest and the refugees had been brought to Uganda after World War II.

In the late 1950s, when the British announced they were to grant Uganda independence, she started civic education sessions at the Hoima district headquarters to discuss democracy and elections. She served in the Uganda Legislative Council from 1958 to 1961 where she tabled a private member's bill on the Registration of Marriages in 1961 and was involved in women's organisations like the Uganda Council of Women and YWCA (U). from 1965 to August 1967, she worked at the Ministry of Education as the secretary to the Teaching Service Committee. In September 1967, she joined Kings College Budo as a teacher.

In 1971, she resigned from teaching at King's College Budo and joined Makerere University as an assistant secretary in the university secretary's office and clerk to the Makerere University Council, handling matters of the University Council (1971–1976).

In 1976, she was transferred from the office of the university secretary to the joint administration of the Faculty of Arts and the Faculty of Social Sciences where she worked until October 1978. While at Makerere, she was also a Director of the East African Posts and Telecommunications Corporation (EAPTC).

== Breaking barriers ==
Her championing of women's rights in Uganda has come a long way. Soon after her arrival at Gayaza High School, she discovered that her salary was to be less than that of her male colleagues. In protest of this, she offered to work without any pay for one year to repay for sponsoring her studies. After one academic year, she told them, she would resign and find employment that would pay her, not as a woman, but as a worker, an ordinary employee. Her action yielded results. The Headmistress reported her action to the wife of the Governor, Sir Andrew Cohen who approached her at the school. She stood her ground and after this meeting, she received equal pay for equal work done. This was how she broke the barrier of unequal pay.

== Family ==
She married Sam Joseph Ntiro in December 1958. They had two sons, Joseph Kakindo Ntiro Amooti and Simbo Nyakwera Ntiro Atenyi.

== Published works ==
- Emboldened. FEMRITE Publications. 2021. ISBN 978-9970-480-10-4.

== Sources ==
Lihamba, Amandina (2007), Women writing Africa. The eastern region (1st ed.), The Feminist Press at the City University of New York, ISBN 978-1-55861-535-9
