= Tanzania. Masterworks of African Sculpture =

Exhibition and catalogue of traditional art from Tanzania

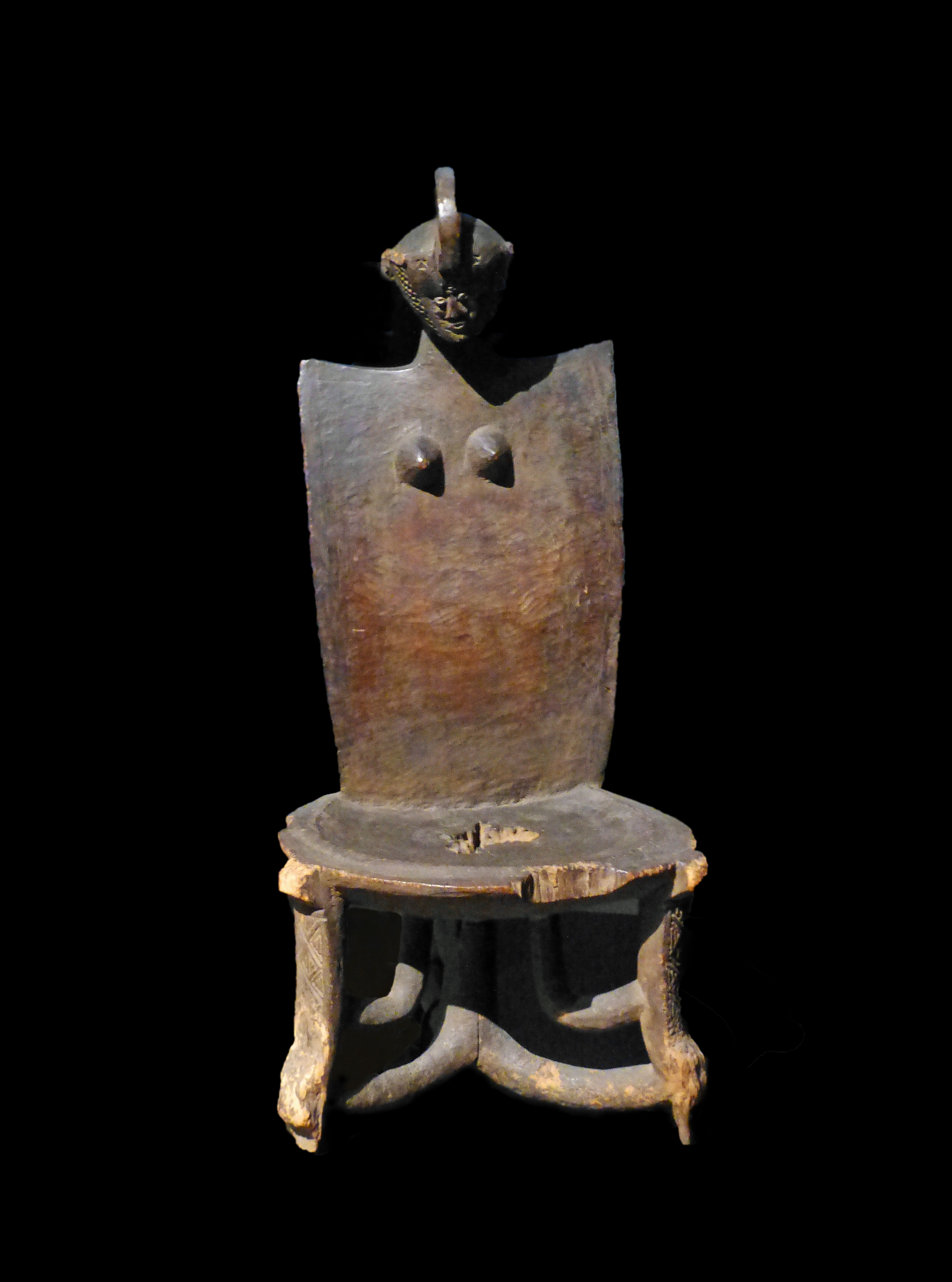
High-backed stool, Kami ethnic group, late 19th century, Musée des Confluences, Lyon

Tanzania. Masterworks of African Sculpture (German: Tanzania. Meisterwerke afrikanischer Skulptur; Swahili: Sanaa za Mabingwa wa Kiafrika) was an art exhibition of traditional African sculptures originating from the mainland region of modern Tanzania. The exhibition was shown in 1994 at the House of World Cultures in Berlin and the same year at the Lenbachhaus art museum in Munich, Germany. Under the same title, it was accompanied by a bilingual catalogue with numerous photographs, maps, illustrations and a bibliography as well as contributions by ethnologists, art historians and collectors, published in German and Swahili, the national language of Tanzania.

With more than 400 sculptures and masks from museums and private collections in Europe, the US, and Africa, the exhibition and extensive catalogue made an important contribution to the public appreciation of traditional wood carving from Tanzania. The featured sculptures and masks had been selected from private collections and, for the most part, from the depots of major ethnological museums in Germany. The diversity and origin of the sculptures allowed for a detailed comparative style analysis and art historical classification according to the country's various ethnic groups. Unlike earlier and more limited presentations of traditional art from Tanganyika, the exhibition and catalogue emphasized the exhibition's wide scope and artistic quality, countering the opinion of art critics that East African artworks were only few and of lower quality compared with the rest of sub-Saharan Africa.

== The exhibition ==
From 29 April to 7 August 1994, the House of World Cultures in Berlin presented an extensive exhibition of African art objects. The same exhibition was shown from 29 September 1994 to 27 November 1994 at the Lenbachhaus-Kunstbau in Munich. More than 400 historical sculptures and masks from Tanganyika, the East African mainland in present-day Tanzania, had been selected for this exhibition. Some of the objects on display came from German museums, while others were provided by private collectors from Europe, the US and Africa.

In the course of the former colony of German East Africa, cultural artefacts and other objects worthy of preservation from the point of view of ethnology came into the possession of German museums and private collections. As evidence of the traditional culture of African peoples, such objects have been kept in ethnological museums in numerous cities since the end of the 19th century. Until the exhibition in Berlin and Munich, sculptures from a wide range of Tanzanian ethnic groups had not previously been presented as evidence of the country's cultural traditions on such a large scale.

In contrast to sculptures from West Africa, which have been appreciated by European artists and collectors such as Picasso, Braque and Apollinaire since the beginning of the 20th century, there had been a prevailing judgement based on art exhibitions and ethnological literature that East Africa was poor in traditional African art. With the 1994 exhibition of East African art objects in Germany, the organisers wanted to make "a previously unknown rich cultural landscape accessible to the wider public." The presentation of the sculptures as works of art from Africa was supplemented by art-historical and ethnological information in the accompanying catalogue.

== The catalogue ==
The 528-page, large-format exhibition catalogue with the same title as the exhibition was compiled under the direction of Munich-based art historians Maria Kecskési and Iris Hahner-Herzog. The book contains contributions by European and American ethnologists, art historians and collectors on aspects of traditional sculptural art from Tanganyika. More than 500 black-and-white photographs of sculptures and masks from public and private collections as well as maps, illustrations and a bibliography complement the individual chapters.

=== Maria Kecskési: "Introduction" ===
In the introductory section, Maria Kecskési, then head of the Africa department of the Ethnological Museum in Munich, describes the aim of the exhibition of sculptural art objects from various ethnic groups in what is now Tanzania. Referring to comparisons between the traditional arts from West and East Africa, she mentions the appreciation and formal richness of West and Central African art, for example from Nigeria and today's Democratic Republic of the Congo. Then, she comments as follows on the thesis by art historian Gerald W. Hartwig, who wrote that East Africa has generally brought forward few sculptures compared to other African regions:

Handbooks, exhibition catalogues and other summaries of the traditional arts of Africa tend to treat the art of East African countries, including Tanzania, very briefly. The justification for this is an alleged scarcity of art among the indigenous peoples and cultures. We know, however, that music, dance and poetry flourished and continue to flourish in East Africa, and the diversity of the so-called applied arts cannot be overlooked: pottery, weaving, wood carving, blacksmithing and beadwork also offer aesthetically remarkable, often richly ornamented products, and the traditions of body adornment are also significant, both in the areas of jewellery and in that of hairstyles, body painting and scarification. They speak clearly enough against the notion of artistic scarcity.

Refuting this thesis of an alleged scarcity of figurative art in Tanzania's history was one of the reasons for putting together this comprehensive exhibition from public and private collections in 1994. Kecskési also refers to changes in the appreciation of traditional African art by European artists such as Georg Baselitz and A. R. Penck who "recognised the 'raw' sculpture of East Africa as rich and expressive and which inspired their own works since at least the 1980s." Furthermore, Kecskési points out that research into traditional cultural objects has only been possible from the middle of the 19th century onwards on the basis of written sources. She also comments on different approaches to cultural anthropology and art history in relation to African art. On the fundamental question of how tradition and creativity relate to each other in African art, she writes the following:

The adoption of foreign impulses, the creation of a stylistic tradition of one's own, stimulated by foreign models, is a thoroughly creative process; and loyalty to forms that have become traditional in no way means reproducing them. [...] The carver is generally guided by the traditional, ideal model (which he does not have before his eyes, but in his memory); in the design of the individual piece, however, he feels largely free.

=== Marc L. Felix: "A Short History of Tanzania" ===
The introductory article by the Belgian art expert and collector Marc L. Felix provides information about the peoples who have inhabited the Tanzanian mainland over the course of its millennia-old history. In addition to the Cushitic, Nilotic and Bantu-speaking groups with their developed cultural techniques in agriculture and animal husbandry, these also include the Swahili-speaking coastal inhabitants, whose societies were characterised by the cultural influences of immigrants from the Persian Gulf, India and Indonesia. Since the 19th century in particular, gradual population movements and cultural change have taken place as a result of the trade in ivory and slaves, the introduction of plantation farming and finally the colonisation of Tanganyika.

=== Marc L. Felix: "The Traditional Sculpture of Tanzania" ===
This art-historical is overview with extensive pictorial material provides a typology of objects that have been handed down as part of the material culture of different ethnic groups. For the most part, these are wooden sculptures including figurines, masks, practical household items or symbols for positions of power and ritual purposes. Felix identifies eight geographically overlapping stylistic groups with specific art-historical, stylistic and typological similarities for the more than 100 ethnic groups on the Tanzanian mainland. Further, he distinguishes between the respective function and the type of sculpture. As an example, he cites an ornately decorated axe as a type that did not serve as a tool, but as a symbol for the ritual function of its use. Depending on the situation, such a symbol could serve "to heal, protect, deter or as a mediator between spirits and humans."

=== Enrico Castelli: "Traditional Sculpture from East-central Tanzania" ===
Enrico Castelli, ethnologist at the University of Perugia, describes above all the so-called mwana hiti (transl.: children made of wood) figurines of the Zaramo, Luguru, Kami, Kwere, Kutu and Ngulu ethnic groups, who live between the coast and the hinterland. As a uniform element, these figurines have female features such as stylised breasts, scarified navels and specific hairstyles. Furthermore, many figurines are decorated with geometric patterns that Castelli interprets as a sign of kinship relationships (lineage). Mwana hiti figurines were used as ritual objects in initiation rites for girls who were accompanied by mothers or godmothers in their passage into the age group of young women.

Similar figurines were also used at the upper ends of ritual staves, musical instruments and for grave steles as an image of an ancestor. Similar grave steles with male figurines exist from the end of the 19th century alongside female ones. The male figurines feature elements such as knives, axes or the Islamic headdress kofia. According to Castelli, the use of grave sculptures of the same ethnic group showing female and male elements indicates the change from matrilineal to patrilineal kinship relationships.

=== Georges Meurant: "Sculptures Made of Clay and Wood from Northeastern Tanzania" ===
In his article, Georges Meurant, collector, author of studies on African art and former professor at the Royal Academy of Fine Arts in Brussels, Belgium, discusses the mostly small-format sculptures made of wood or clay of the ethnic groups south of the Kenyan border in the north-eastern part of the country. These were used in connection with initiation, fertility or agriculture, but also as tools of sorcerers and healers.

In his explanations, Meurant refers to the collection and publications of the self-taught British ethnologist of Austrian descent Hans Cory. Thanks to Cory's long years of residence in Tanganyika and his knowledge of the language, he had collected ethnographic information since the 1930s, including on clay figurines and their ritual use. Cory had published numerous studies, particularly on topics such as African customary law, local customs and rites, secret societies and witchcraft, traditional medicine, music and initiation rites.

Meurant further describes common features of the wooden and clay figurines of the ethnic groups with respect to the design of the heads, ears, legs and arms. In doing so, he identifies locally specific characteristics of both anthropomorphic and animal figures.

=== Georges Meurant: "The Sculptural Art of the Nyamwezi" ===
Before Meurant discusses the sculptures of the Nyamwezi and neighbouring ethnic groups, he provides an overview of the formal characteristics of their sculptures according to the geographical classification on the map in the catalogue p. 39. He distinguishes three categories with regard to the provenance of the sculptures in Western collections: First and even before the official founding of the German colony in East Africa in 1891, German collectors had acquired sculptures in this region. Later, ethnologists such as Karl Weule handed over their artefacts to ethnological museums, including those in Berlin and Leipzig. A second group of artefacts were taken to Europe by private collectors from the subsequent Belgian and British mandates in East Africa. The third and most extensive group is the contemporary trade in African art, which, according to Meurant, includes thousands of sculptures and masks from Tanganyika. However, there is often a lack of background information on the origin and original use of these objects.

Meurant also highlights the most important forms, cultural functions and categorisation of sculptures and masks from the settlement area of the Nyamwezi and their sub-groups such as the Sukuma. He categorises the sculptures according to formal similarities such as size and texture, the execution of body parts (for example heads, limbs or secondary sexual characteristics), the depiction of female and male figurines or animal figures. Finally, he assesses the earlier scholarship regarding an alleged scarcity of sculptures as inaccurate. Further, he criticises Tanzania's centralist cultural policy during the first decades after independence as a "rejection" of indigenous traditions in favour of the modern state's national culture.

=== Nancy Ingram Nooter: "East African High-backed Stools: A Transcultural Tradition" ===
The US-American art historian and former curator at the National Museum of African Art Nancy Ingram Nooter begins her description of stools with raised backrests by referring to similar forms of this type of sculpture among various ethnic groups in sub-Saharan Africa. As ceremonial thrones for dignitaries, stools are also known from Ghana, Cameroon and Angola, among other places. However, many examples originate from Eastern Africa, from Ethiopia in the north to Zambia and Zimbabwe in the south.

Numerous examples of such surviving stools have been attributed to the Nyamwezi, Zaramo, Gogo, Kaguru, Luguru, Doe, and Kwere people. The latter four ethnic groups have matrilineal traditions, which is reflected in stools with female attributes such as stylised breasts or hairstyles. There are also some examples with male attributes, with the social status of both male and female dignitaries expressed by such ceremonial stools.

Characteristic features of the stools are their round seat, three legs or, alternatively, a pedestal. The backrests are much higher than the stool itself and often feature stylised human figures or abstract and geometric shapes. They are also carved from a single piece of wood. Apart from the specimens from Tanzania, these features can also be found on stools made by the Tabwa and Bemba people, who live west of Lake Tanganyika in the Democratic Republic of the Congo and in Zambia. Such similarities in sculptures from different ethnic groups are attributed to migratory movements and the exchange of goods, e.g. through the transregional caravan trade in East Africa.

=== Allen F. Roberts: "Affinity of Forms: Aesthetic Points of Contact Between the Peoples of Western Tanzania and South-eastern Zaire" ===
On the basis of his field research in Tanzania and studies in the Belgian Royal Museum for Central Africa as well as the relevant specialist literature, the social anthropologist at the University of Iowa and former director of the African Studies Center at UCLA, Allen F. Roberts, describes aesthetic and formal similarities in sculptures found on both sides of Lake Tanganyika. In particular, the sculptures' shapes of the eyes, necks or arms and their proportions are similar among different ethnic groups in these regions on both sides of the state borders of Tanzania and the present-day Democratic Republic of the Congo (DRC).

In his 1967 book Masks and Figures from Eastern and Southern Africa, social anthropologist Ladislav Holy had already pointed out such similarities. Roberts, however, disagrees with Holy's judgement, who claimed that the ethnic groups in Tanzania had merely created an art that "lacks unity and presents a disparate image." Roberts, on the other hand, describes the similarities between sculptures attributed to the Tabwa, Hemba, and Luba peoples, living on the western side of the lake in DRC and those of the Fipa, Jiji, Tongwe, Hehe, Ha, and Sukuma people in Tanzania. He attributes these similarities to centuries-old kinship, commercial and cultural relationships between these ethnic groups based on human migration and trade relations. Roberts also mentions the East African slave trade, which led to relative wealth and a lively exchange of goods for example in the city of Ujiji, as a reason for cultural exchange. According to Roberts, these relationships and the willingness to adopt originally foreign ways of life, even across natural and political borders, explain the appreciation and use of sculptures from neighbouring traditions.

=== Charles Meur: "Approach to the Carving of Masks in Tanzania" ===
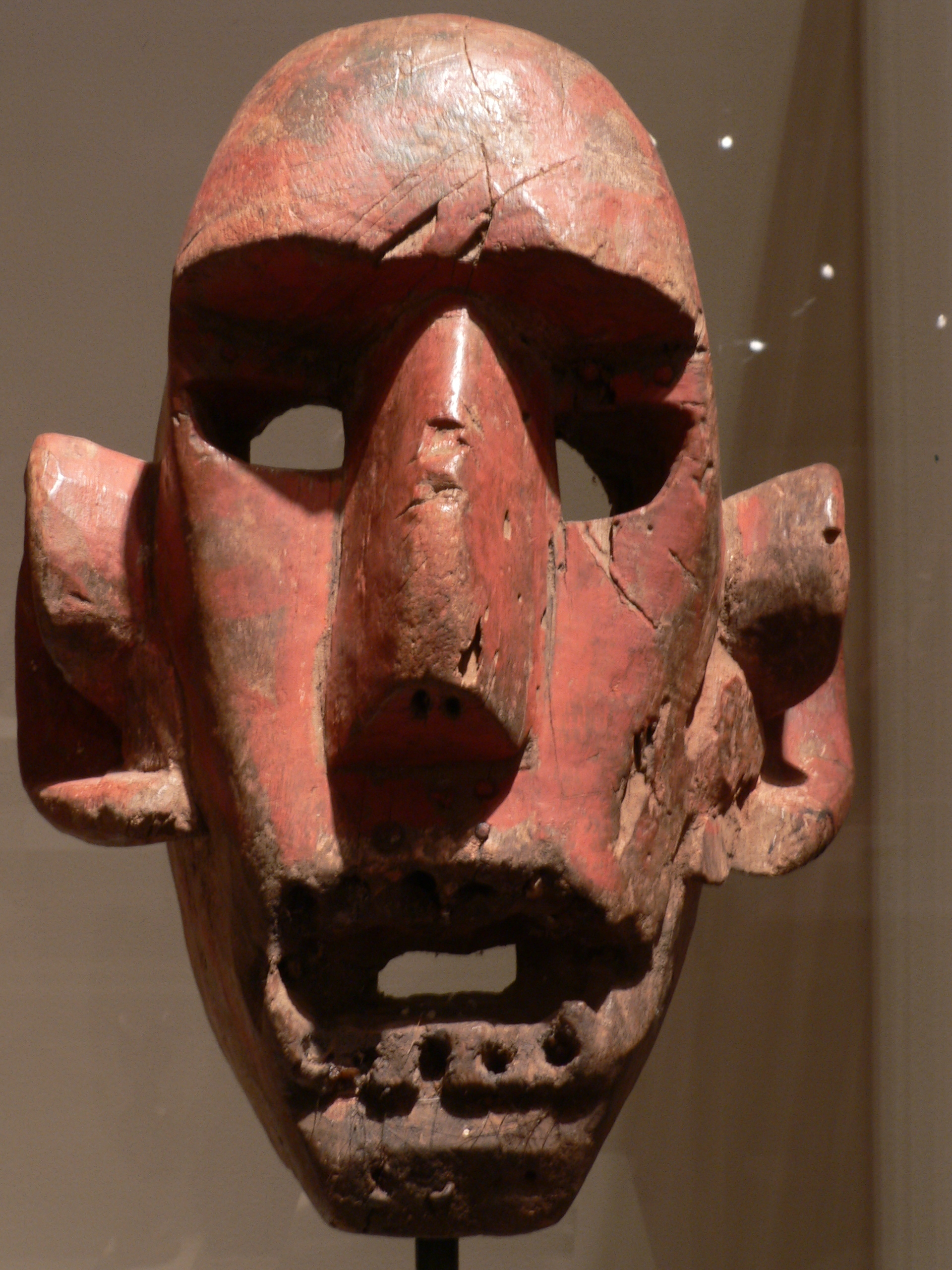
Sukuma mask, 20th cent., exhibition catalogue no. 219

The art historical essay about masks in the exhibition by Belgian artist and collector Charles Meur contains detailed formal descriptions and stylistic analyses of wooden masks from numerous ethnic groups, including the Nyamwezi, Sukuma, Zaramo and others. Meur lists nine stylistic groups that cover the whole of Tanganyika with the exception of the Makonde region in the south. His text also contains a map with drawings of the various types of masks. Further drawings describe characteristic forms, such as the design of the carved inner and outer sides of a mask, the eyes, noses, ears, mouths and other figurative elements. The author assumes that most of the masks were originally painted in colour and mentions other distinguishing elements, such as human teeth, hair and pieces of animal fur attached to some masks.

Meur, who also created all the geographical maps in the catalogue, describes his subjective impressions and associations based on the "extreme simplification, which is free of any attempt at probability", as follows: "The original block is not lost in the hewn form, it remains a fragment of nature. [...] For these farmers and hunters with a their lose relationship to nature, a few details are enough to recognise a self-contained, independent reality in a block of wood that appears to us to have hardly been worked on at all..." Also, Meur points out that Homo habilis first appeared in the vicinity of the great lakes of Central Africa, where the first evidence of art in the form of rock paintings has been found.

=== Giselher Blesse: "South-eastern Tanzania: The Art of the Makonde and Neighbouring Peoples" ===
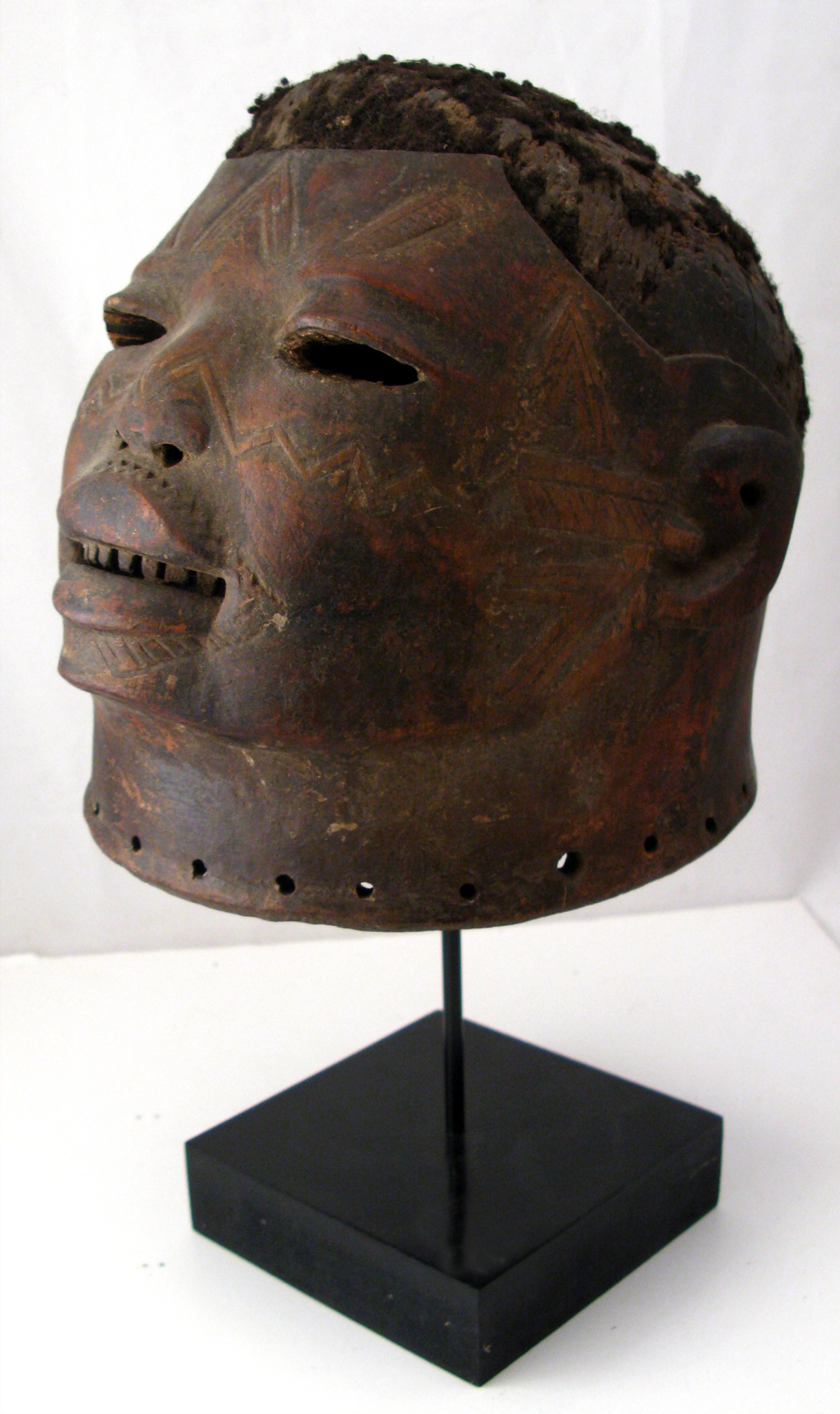
Makonde helmet mask

In his description of masks worn by the Makonde people living on both sides of the Ruvuma river in Mozambique and Tanzania, Giselher Blesse, ethnologist and former collaborator of the Leipzig Museum of Ethnography, begins by describing the use of these masks (singular: lipiko, plural: mapiko) in ritual dance performances. Especially at the end of initiation rites for boys and girls, masked young men performed such dances for the village community. The fully veiled dancers represented the ancestors and spirits of the ethnic group with energetic, sometimes frightening movements to the sound of drums and singing. A distinction can be made between masks that were attached in front of the dancer's face and masks that were worn on the dancer's head. Both forms, as well as carved breast plates attached in front of the dancer's body, have been represented in Western collections as early examples of traditional carvings from Tanganyika since the beginning of the 20th century.

Masks and the much rarer figurative sculptures of the Makonde and neighbouring ethnic groups bear male or female facial features, with the latter also being characterised by the characteristic lip plate. Some masks depict animals such as antelopes, whereby animal figures with long horns are also known as devil masks (sheitani). Blesse also mentions artistically decorated Makonde objects such as stools, containers for tobacco or ritual medicine, as well as figurative parts of musical instruments.

=== Marc L. Felix: "Art Historical Conclusion" ===
Felix concludes by exploring regional influences on Tanzanian traditional art from southern and eastern Africa, South Asia, and the Persian Gulf. He questions what defines its uniqueness, identifying three common themes: the female figure, and occasionally, paired sculptures or masks with male and female features. The third theme is represented by sculptures of cattle, usually made of clay, but also of wood or, more rarely, of metal. Even though these themes are found in many sub-Saharan regions, the author considers them to be unmistakably Tanzanian in their specific design. As examples, he mentions the numerous variations of mwana hiti doll-like figurines which have not only been found on the Tanzanian mainland, but also in neighbouring regions. Other typical themes are the so-called "piggyback figures" and the widespread high-backed stools. Wooden abstracted grave poles, which are known in pairs with long arms and features for both sexes, as well as long decorated staves as status symbols for important persons are further characteristic Tanzanian stylistic forms. Finally, Felix also notes striking differences between the masks from Tanganyika and those from other regions of Africa.

== Reception ==
A review in the Süddeutsche Zeitung of the exhibition in Munich emphasized the expressive power of the works, "that can be understood by the visitor even without background information." referring to the appreciation of African sculpture by artists such as Pablo Picasso, Ernst Ludwig Kirchner and Georg Baselitz. Also, it said that "[...] the rawness of the sculptures touches and [...] reveals itself without context." Further, the review posited the "overwhelming diversity" of this first comprehensive survey of Tanzanian art.

In her report on the exhibition in Berlin for the academic journal African Arts, German ethnologist Kerstin Volker wrote: "The number of objects and the rich diversity of forms and styles in "Tanzania" put it in a superior class. Chosen with great care, the pieces were of high quality and were excellent examples of their types. The exhibition made an important contribution to the research on Tanzanian traditional woodcarving." Further, Volker noted a synthesis of cross-border stylistic influences on the various cultures of Tanzania, which can be traced back to migratory movements and regional trade. In particular, she referred to highly stylised ritual staves and fly-whisks as well as mwana hiti figures and piggyback figurines. In the latter, a younger woman sits on the shoulders of an older woman, seen as a kind of godmother in initiation rites. Volker emphasised the depiction of female attributes on these objects as an indication of the matrilineality of the respective ethnic groups in eastern Tanzania.

Volker also commented on the Makonde sculptures on display, acquired by the Museum of Ethnology in Leipzig between 1850 and 1950. Among them, she emphasised little-known and unusual examples of asymmetrical masks as well as masks with the typical lip plate. Other mask-like sculptures on display, which were used by men in ritual contexts, featured carved breasts, a protruding navel or pyrographic decorative forms. With reference to the limited knowledge of traditional art from Tanzania, Volker missed culturally specific information on the ethnic groups and the use of their objects: "Although wall texts stressed that these objects were not produced as self-explanatory l'art pour l'art, that is exactly how they were presented. Captions tended to classify the objects rather than give information about their meaning, use or other background."

German ethnologist Elisabeth Grohs described the exhibition as a "discovery for the German public" in her article about "the long overdue revaluation of the artistic tradition of this country." According to her, the catalogue is an important document, as many objects will in future "only be accessible via this catalogue, as they will be bought up by private collectors and be dispersed". However, she felt that the individual contributions lacked a common theoretical approach that would also include the function and significance of the sculpture's original use. She further asked why Tanzania was only discovered as an art region at a relatively late stage and how collectors have been able to acquire a large number of previously unknown objects since the 1970s. According to her, the exhibition lacked information on the provenance of privately owned sculptures. In her opinion, the stylistic categorisations were sometimes too detailed and not very illuminating. She also raised the question of whether some of the sculptures were originals or copies.

Grohs also commented critically on the motives of art historians and collectors in view of the claim to inform the public in Tanzania and Germany about the country's artistic traditions: "Why do Western art collectors and researchers attach so much importance to appear as well-meaning patrons and to be working in a completely disinterested manner to rehabilitate disregarded art?" According to Grohs, but the numerous illustrations also served commercial purposes, as the depiction of African art in catalogues considerably increased the value of a sculpture on the fine art market. Overall, Grohs believes that the current interest in African art is determined by the public interest in Europe and America. According to her, the "views of the African population and their reaction to Western collectors' passion [...] have not been reflected for a long time." Finally, Grohs criticised clichés about African art, such as in Meur's contribution, that speaks of a "blind and mute block of material" or an "animistic artist".

In her review of the catalogue in African Arts, Diane Pelrine, art historian and curator at Indiana University in Bloomington, US, described the book as an important addition to the relevant literature and highlighted the illustrations as a significant addition to previously rarely published Tanzanian art objects. On the other hand, the author missed references to contextual information on many of the objects. Pelrine also criticised the fact that the catalogue deals almost exclusively with figurative sculptures and that only a few illustrations show non-figurative objects such as musical instruments, hairpins or snuffboxes. According to her, the stylistic richness of such objects could provide an interesting contrast to many of the figurines and masks. She also criticised the fact that Swahili culture from coastal areas with its significant influence on art in Tanzania, is only mentioned in Felix's contribution on style regions. Finally, Pelrine criticised that no Tanzanian author was represented among the eight contributors, which missed a chance for exchange between African and Western scholars.

== Masks and sculptures from Tanganyika ==
The objects shown were not part of the exhibition but merely serve as examples of similar sculptures and masks.

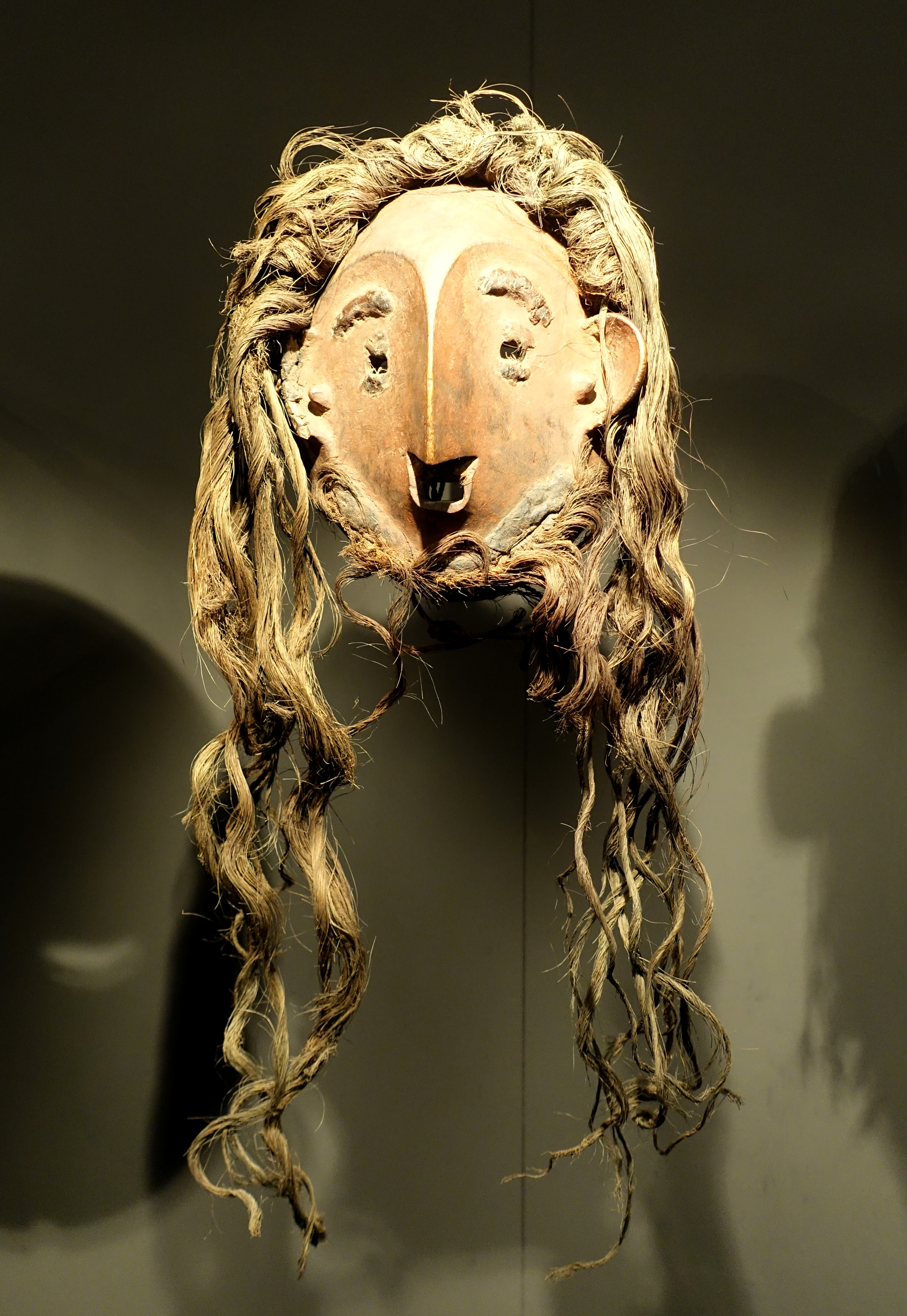
Ndimbu mask, Makonde or Mwera people

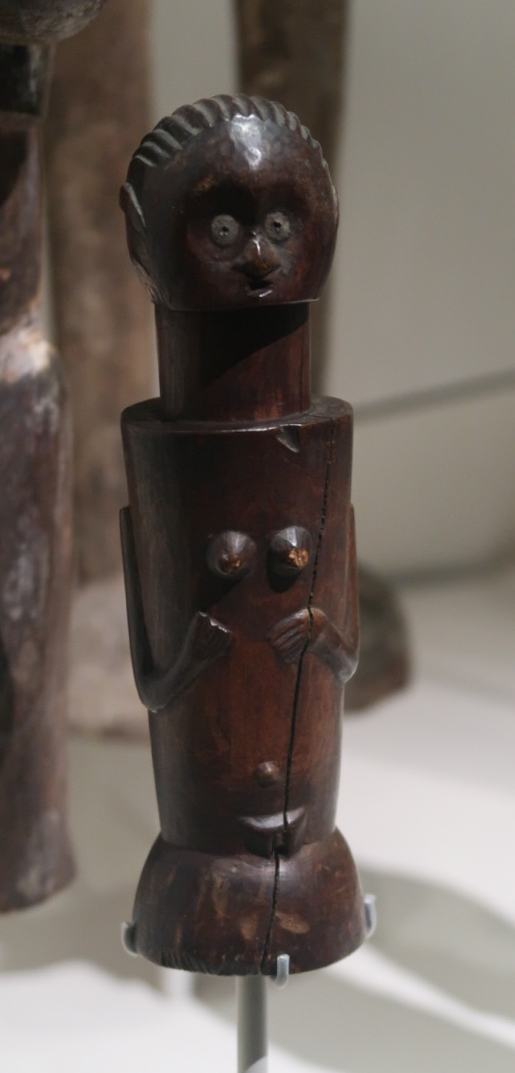
Mwana hiti figurine, Zaramo or Doe people

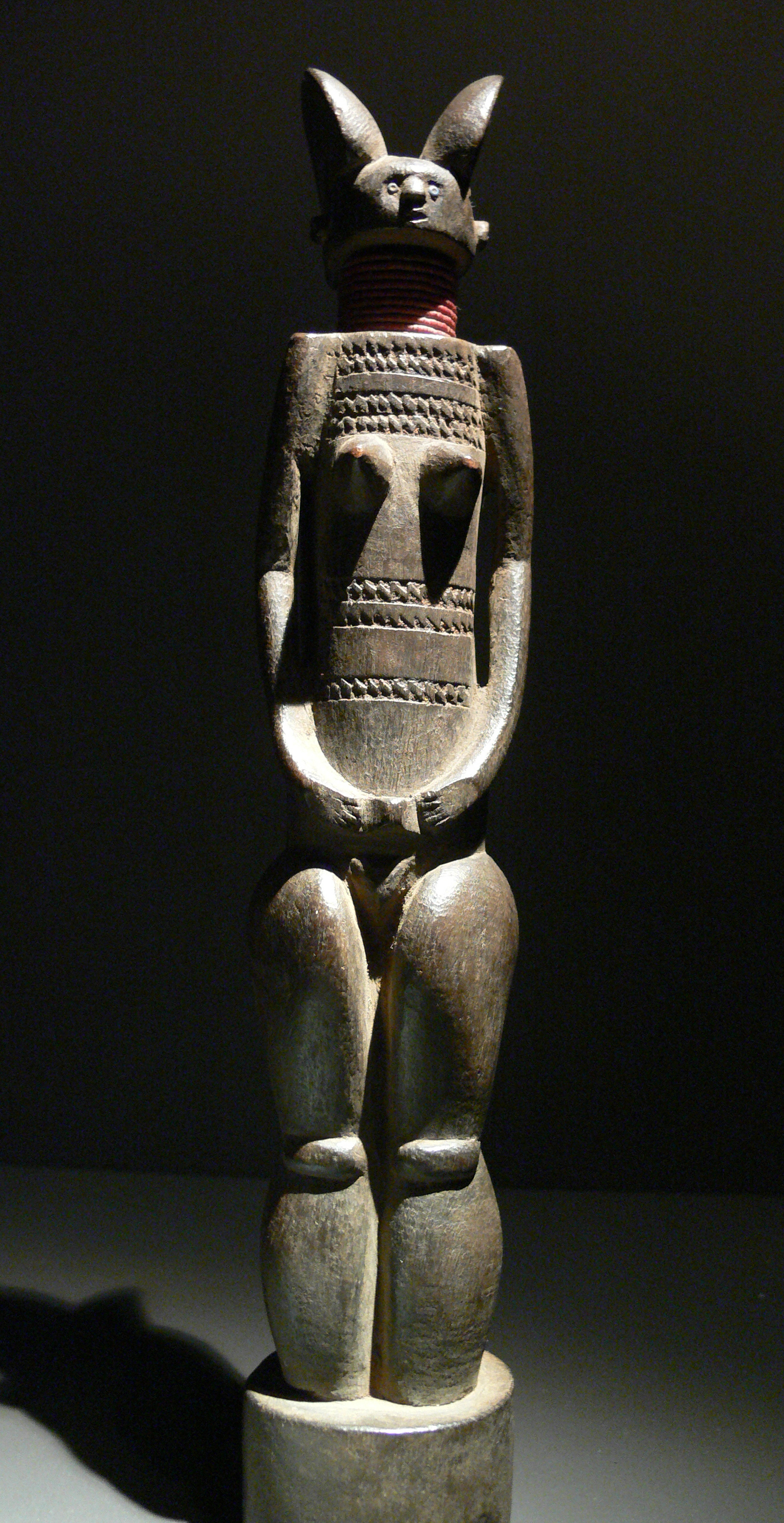
Mwana hiti figurine, Doe people

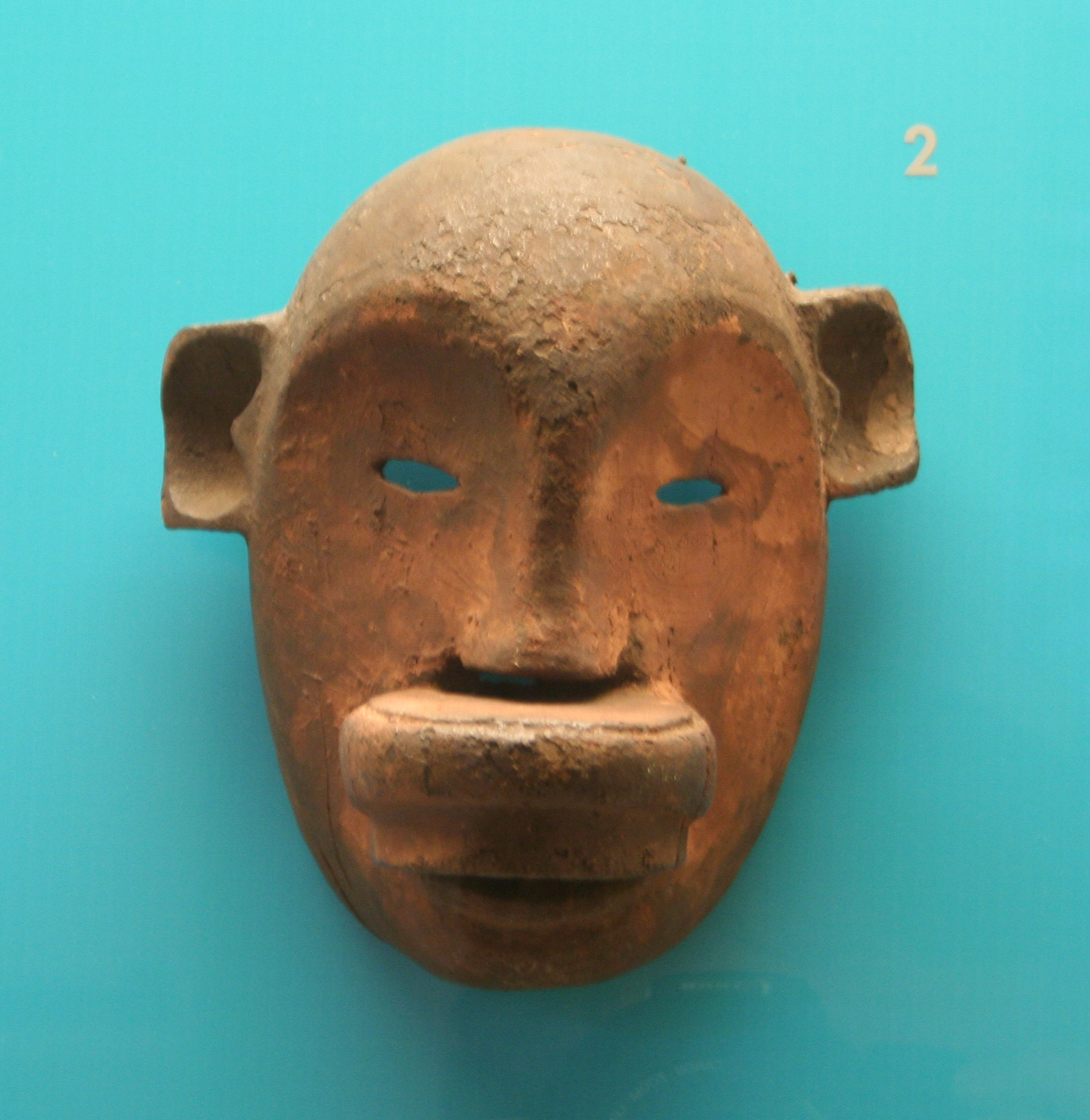
Mask with lip plate, Makonde people

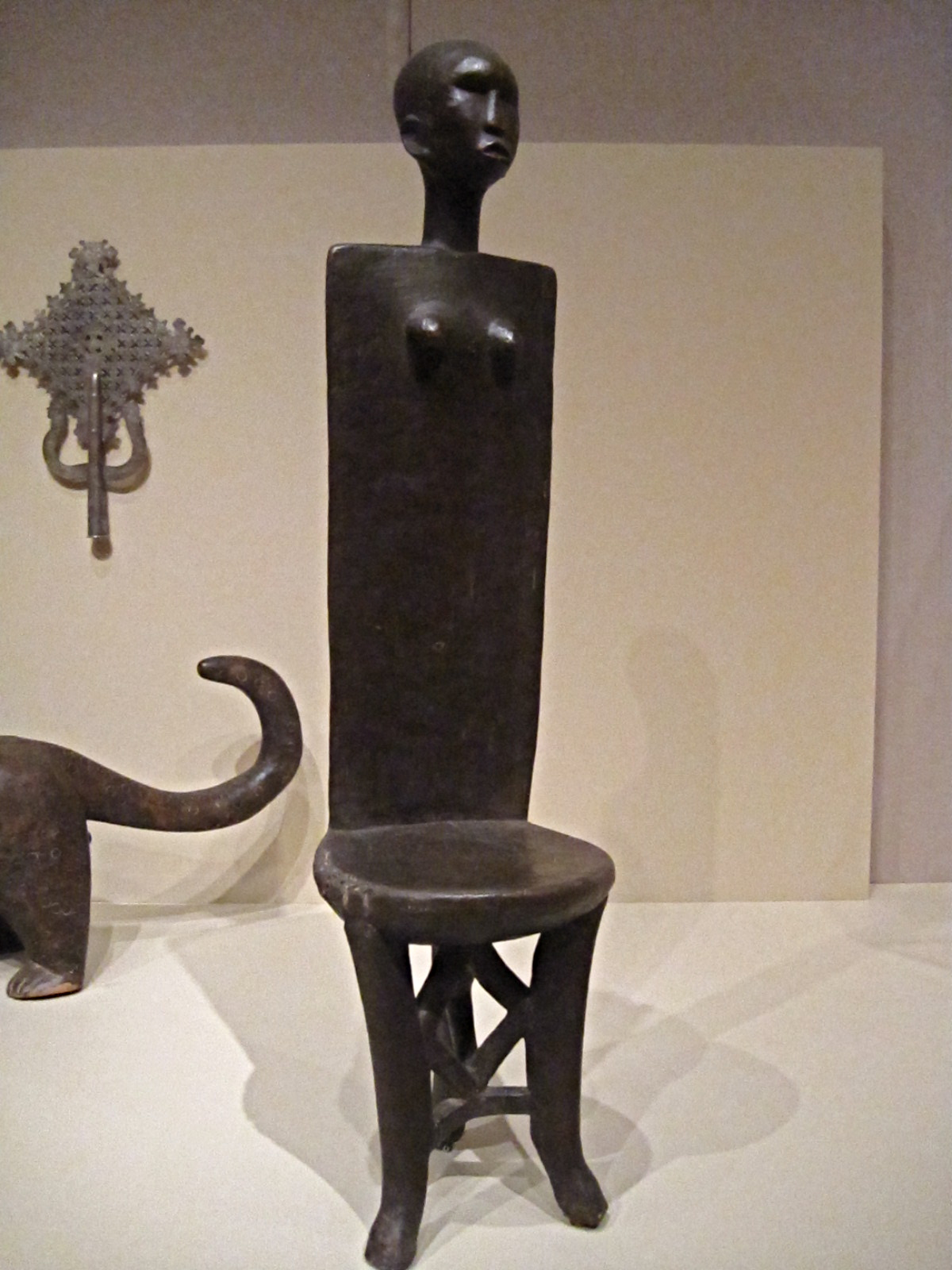
High-backed stool, Luguru people

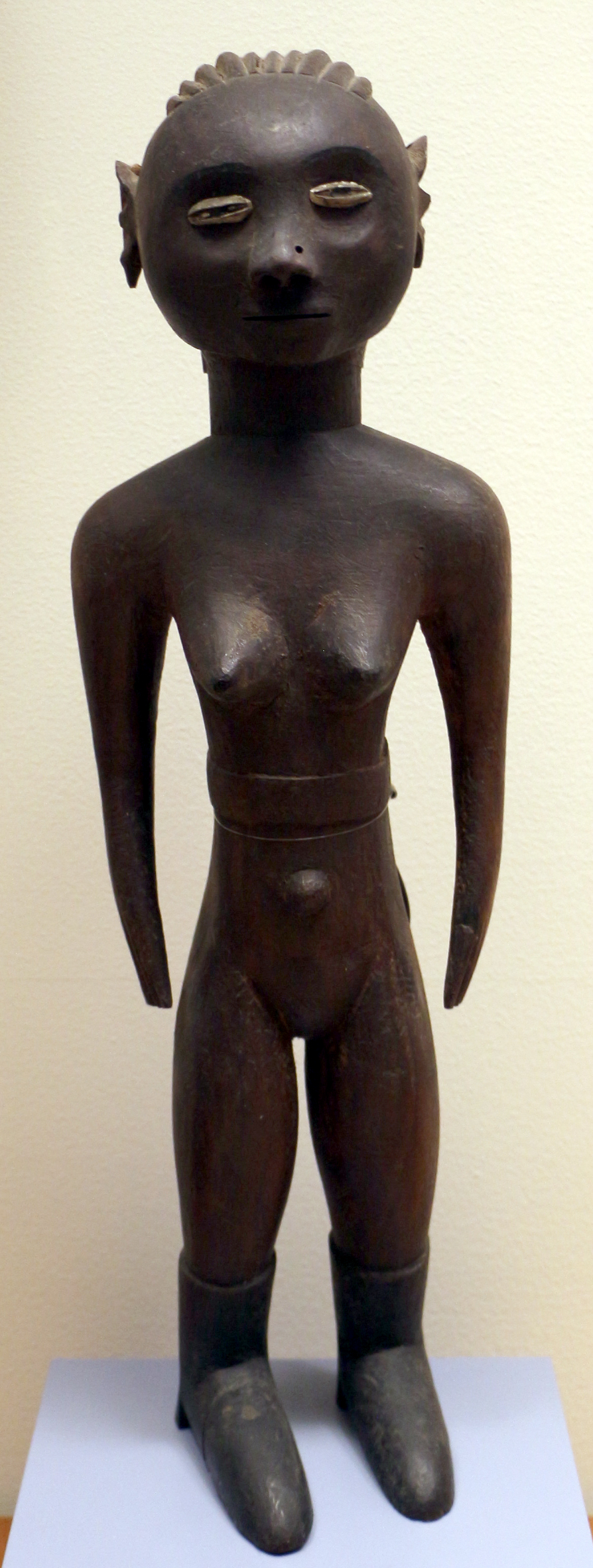
Female figurine, Kwere people

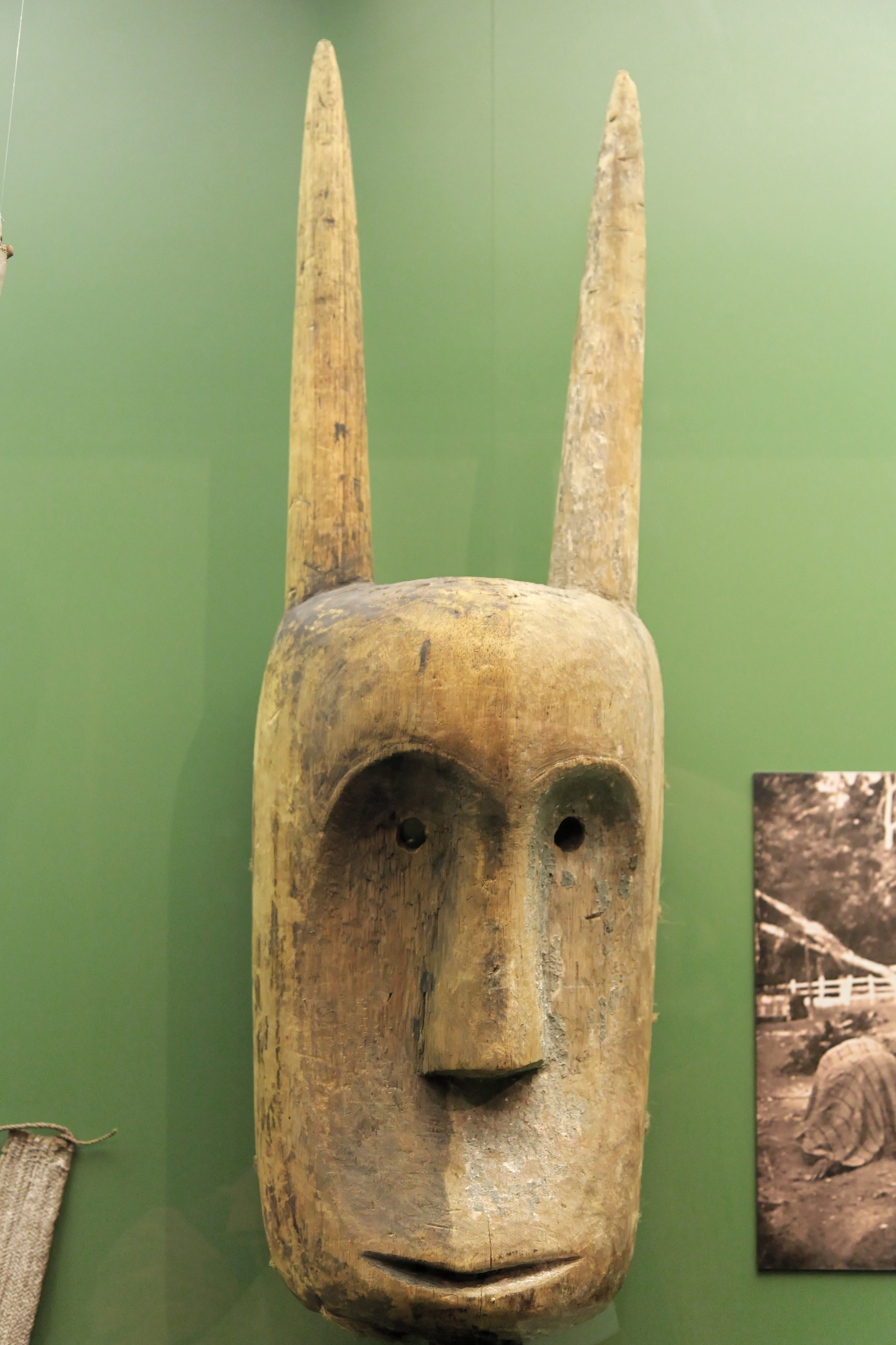
Makonde mask (sheitani)
