= Sam Joseph Ntiro =

Tanzanian artist and diplomat (1923–1993)

- Born: 20 April 1923
- Died: 1 January 1993 (aged 69)
- Citizenship: Tanzania
- Occupations: Politician; Diplomat; Painter

Sam Joseph Ntiro (20 April 1923 – 1 January 1993) was a Tanzanian visual artist and the first East African High Commissioner to the Court of Saint James in London from the then Republic of Tanganyika to the United Kingdom. He served in this position from his country's independence in 1961 until 1964 and was also Ambassador of Tanganyika to Ireland during this period. In his long career, he was a well-known artist and painter, a diplomat, civil servant, and an academic. He travelled extensively and exhibited his artworks both at home and abroad.

== Early life and education ==
Ntiro was born in the Machame area of Hai District, in the village of Ndereny, parish of Nkuu. This is in the Kilimanjaro Region of northwest Tanzania on the slopes of Mount Kilimanjaro in Tanzania. Ntiro attended Ndereny Nkuu Primary School and received his Junior Secondary and Senior Secondary Education at Old Moshi Secondary school in the Marangu area. During his lifetime, Ntiro acquired fluent English, Swahili, and the local languages Kimachame and Kimarangu. Further, he had a working knowledge of Runyoro, Luganda, French, German and Italian.

Ntiro received his tertiary education at Makerere College of the University of East Africa, then affiliated to the University of London, where he studied Art and Education. He did postgraduate work at the Slade College of Fine Art, University of London.

== Career ==
Ntiro's painting Chagga Beer Making, 1957, at The Phillips Collection

He taught at Makerere College (now Makerere University), Kyambogo Technical Institute (now Kyambogo University) and the University of Dar es Salaam. Together with Elias Jengo, he was a founding member of the university's Department of Music, Arts and Culture. In Dar es Salaam he was Resident Artist, Senior Lecturer and at his retirement associate professor. He also did research in the United States of America, in the 1970s at Dillard & Xavier Universities in New Orleans, Louisiana, and in the 1980s at the University of Wisconsin at Madison in both areas of Fine Art and African Studies. Ntiro also served as an external examiner for Fine Art, Art History and sometimes History, Geography in Kenya, Uganda, Tanzania, Malawi, Zambia, Zimbabwe, the United Kingdom, the US, Canada, Ghana and Nigeria.

In 1953, Ntiro published Desturi za Wachagga ("Traditions of the Chagga"), an ethnohistory of the Chagga.

In 1961, Ntiro left Makerere College, where he had become Professor of Painting, to accept a post as the first High Commissioner to the Court of St James's in London for the Republic of Tanganyika. Following this, Ntiro taught both in Kyambogo Technical Institute and University of Dar es Salaam from 1967 to 1973. Further, he served as Commissioner of Culture for the Government of Tanzania. The department was first attached to the Ministry of Education and then moved to the Ministry of National Culture and Youth.

== Personal life ==
In 1958, Ntiro married Evangeline Sarah Nyendwoha, who was the first woman university graduate in Uganda and East Africa. They had two sons, Joseph and Simbo.

== Reception ==
The National Museum of African Art in Washington, D.C., owns his oil painting Cattle Feeding and has called Ntiro "one of the pioneers of African modern painting from Eastern Africa and perhaps the best representative of the programs of the Makerere University art school in Uganda." His 1956 oil painting titled Men Taking Banana Beer to Bride by Night is in the collection of the Museum of Modern Art, New York City. In the United Kingdom, Lakeland Arts owns his 1960 painting Monkeys Feeding. Paintings by Ntiro have been sold in the 2020s as works of modern and contemporary African art at auction houses including Sotheby's and Bonham's.

== See also ==
- Contemporary African art
- Culture of Tanzania - Painting
