= Hans Cory =

British anthropologist of Austrian descent in Tanganyika (1889-1962)

- Born: 1889, Vienna, Austrian-Hungarian Empire
- Died: 1962 (aged 72–73) , Dar es Salaam, Tanganyika
- Occupations: anthropologist, sociologist, art collector
- Known for: African figurines: their ceremonial use in puberty rites in Tanganyika

Hans Cory OBE (born Hans Koritschoner; 18 March 1889 – 24 April 1962) was a self-taught British social anthropologist of Austrian descent, farmer and sociologist with a special interest in traditional lifestyles of ethnic groups in former Tanganyika, now Tanzania. Little is known about his childhood and youth in Vienna as well as about his life before the First World War in colonial German East Africa.

Born in Vienna, Austria, and having lived most of his adult life in Tanganyika, he died at age 73 in Dar es Salaam. His publications on a wide range of ethnographic subjects constitute an important record of the history of Tanganyika.

== Life and career ==
=== Early life ===
Cory was born as Hans Koritschoner in 1889 in Vienna, then capital of the Austrian-Hungarian Empire, as son of physician Samuel Robert Koritschoner and his wife Rebekka Amalia Koritschoner (née Goldschmidt). He was married to Lillian Koritschoner (née Wolff) and was said to come from a musical family. According to British ethnomusicologist Hugh Tracey, with whom Cory shared his collection of folk music of the Sukuma and Nyamwezi, writings by his Viennese contemporary Sigmund Freud prompted Cory to explore mental illness and African forms of therapy through ritual dances and music.

Cory had arrived before World War I in colonial German East Africa. After the German defeat, Great Britain took over Tanganyika as a British mandate territory, and Cory was sent to a British camp in Palestine as a prisoner of war. In 1926, he returned to Tanganyika and became a farmer in Morogoro region, while at the same time pursuing his studies of African life and traditions that he had begun during the war.

=== Ethnographic studies and publications ===
Speaking Swahili and several local languages, Cory had a special interest in the cultural traditions of various ethnic groups, at the time called tribes. A self-taught anthropologist with long years of ethnographic studies based on participant observation, Cory collected extensive ethnographic field data, including traditional music, wall paintings and ritual sculptures. Based on this, he published articles and books about such diverse subjects as colonial history, traditional law, land tenure, ethnic customs and beliefs, secret societies and witchcraft, food and plants, as well as traditional songs and poetry.

From the 1930s to 1950s, he collected more than 1000 clay figurines used for initiation rites and published works on this topic, most notably his African Figurines: their Ceremonial Use in Puberty Rites in Tanganyika. According to German ethnologist Elisabeth Grohs, who studied puberty ceremonies and the use of figurines in Tanzania in the 1960s, Cory donated a large number of these figurines at the end of his life to the National Museum in Dar es Salaam. Some of these figurines were published in 1994 in the catalogue for the German exhibition "Tanzania - Masterpieces of African Sculpture", accompanied by art historical essays in German and Swahili.

In his 1944 article: "Figurines Used in the Initiation Ceremonies of the Nguu of Tanganyika Territory", Cory described the ritual "use of figurines and songs in combination [...] generally used in East Africa at puberty ceremonies for both sexes." He also noted a "rigid separation of the two sexes" for the ceremonies. Usually, every sculpture was accompanied by a specific song, and Cory indicated a short section of the lyrics in both the native language and in English translation, along with photographs and explanations about their ritual meaning and use. Expressing his appreciation of these figurines and songs, he called them examples of the "descriptive and symbolic art" and statements of the ethics of social conduct, used by East Africans for important occasions.

Based on copies of wall paintings made for initiation rites of the Sukuma and Nyamwezi "Snake Charmers" societies, Cory published his collection of what he called 'primitive' paintings and his comments about this form of teaching oral history of the societies to novitiates. In a review of this work, Cory was quoted as follows:

These wall paintings may do something, even if it is only very little, to tackle the problem of better understanding between Europeans and Africans. They show that the African processes artistic faculties which may not yet display great technical skill, but which are already sufficiently developed to give testimony to the existence of, perhaps not striking heights of artistry, but at any rate considerable depths of intellectual penetration.

— Hans Cory, Wall-paintings by Snake Charmers in Tanganyika, 1953

As government sociologist, Cory conducted a project from the mid-1950s onwards to collect and codify the customary law of a number of ethnic groups in Tanganyika, such as the Sukuma, Nyamwezi, Haya, Gogo among others. After independence of the country at the end of 1961, these attempts to translate traditional law into new national legal structures were continued. His unpublished papers are collected in the library of the University of Dar es Salaam and, together with his publications, constitute an important ethnographic record of the history of Tanganyika.

After 1950, Cory lived in Mwanza on Lake Victoria, and his last book was devoted to the history of the adjacent Bukoba district. For his services to the culture of Tanganyika, he was awarded the Order of the British Empire.

== Literary recognition ==
In Ernest Hemingway's account of his 1934 safari in Tanganyika, Green Hills of Africa, Hemingway tells of his encounter with the Austrian farmer "Kandisky", who shared his knowledge of local culture with Hemingway and who in real life was no other than Hans Cory.

== Selected works ==
as Hans Koritschoner

- Ngoma Ya Sheitani. An East African Native Treatment for Psychical Disorder, 1936
- Some East African Native Songs. Tanganyika Notes and Records 4: 51–64, 1937

as Hans Cory

- "Figurines used in the Initiation Ceremonies of the Nguu of Tanganyika Territory". Africa. 14 (8): 459–464. 1944. doi:10.2307/1156305. ISSN 0001-9720. JSTOR 1156305.
- with M.M. Hartnoll: Customary law of the Haya Tribe, Tanganyika territory. London 1945
- The Ingredients of Magic Medicines. 1949.
- The Ntemi; the traditional rites in connection with the burial, election, enthronement and magic powers of a Sukuma chief. London, 1951.
- Sukuma Law and Custom, London, Oxford University Press I953
- Wall-Paintings by Snake Charmers in Tanganyika. London, Faber and Faber 1953
- The Indigenous Political System of the Sukuma and Proposals for Political Reform. Nairobi 1954
- Sikilizeni mashairi. Mwanza, Nairobi 1950. (Cory's own poems in Swahili)
- African figurines: their ceremonial use in puberty rites in Tanganyika. London, Faber and Faber 1956.
- History of the Bukoba District. Mwanza 1959

== See also ==
- Culture of Tanzania - Sculpture
