= Tanzania Nakupenda Kwa Moyo Wote =

Swahili-language patriotic song about Tanzania

Song
- Genre: Tanzanian Anthem

"Tanzania Nakupenda Kwa Moyo Wote" is a Swahili-language patriotic song about Tanzania in East Africa. The song's history and authorship is uncertain, but stretches back to the colonial days, when then it was sung as thus "Tanganyika, Tanganyika nakupenda kwa moyo wote."

It cannot be ruled out that it was part of an attempt to develop a national anthem towards the end of colonial rule before the South African lyrics version that was introduced and popularized by South African freedom fighters became adopted as anthem. The composition effort could have been coordinated by colonial officials in the last days of British colonialism in Tanganyika. It was changed to Tanzania, Tanzania after the formation of the Tanzanian union in 1964. In Tanzania it is frequently sung alongside the national anthem "Mungu Ibariki Afrika".

The song appears in the 2004 documentary Darwin's Nightmare in which a female sex worker sings the song to seemingly uninterested Russian pilots. Her name was Eliza and she was killed a few days after by an Australian client.

The song was performed in Australia for the fourth President of Tanzania, Jakaya Mrisho Kikwete, when he was awarded an Honorary Doctor of Philosophy from the University of Newcastle.

== Lyrics ==
1.Tanzania Tanzania
Nakupenda kwa moyo wote,
Nchi yangu Tanzania,
Jina lako ni tamu sana,
Nilalapo nakuota wewe,
Niamkapo ni heri mama wee,
Tanzania Tanzania,
Nakupenda kwa moyo wote.

2.Tanzania Tanzania,
Ninapokwenda safarini,
Kutazama maajabu Biashara nayo makazi,
Sitaweza kusahau mimi, mambo mema ya kwetu kabisa,
Tanzania Tanzania,
Nakupenda kwa moyo wote.

3.Tanzania Tanzania,
Watu wengi wanakusifu,
Siasa yako na desturi,
Vilikuletea uhuru,
Hatuwezi kusahau sisi,
Mambo mema ya kwetu kabisa,
Tanzania Tanzania, nakupenda kwa moyo wote.

4.Tanzania Tanzania
Karibu wasio na kwao
Wenye shida na taabu
Kukimbizwa na walowezi
Tanzania yawakaribisha
Tuungane kiume chema wee
Tanzania Tanzania
Mola awe na we daima.

Translation:

Tanzania Tanzania
I love you with all my heart
My country Tanzania
Your name is very sweet
When I sleep I dream of you
When I wake I am at peace
Tanzania Tanzania
I love you with all my heart.

Tanzania Tanzania
When I go to travel
To see wonders Business and places
I will never forget our good conduct ever
Tanzania Tanzania
I love you with all my heart.

Tanzania Tanzania
Your people are very good
Countries are dreaming of you, no one shines like you
Guests are running to you, you have a strong security
Tanzania Tanzania
You are blessed to nations.

Tanzania Tanzania
Welcome guests
With trouble and misery
Chased by thieves
Tanzania welcomes you
Lets unite in peace
Tanzania Tanzania
God be with you forever.
