= May Balisidya =

Tanzanian author (1947-1987)

May Lenna Balisidya Matteru (May 10, 1947 – December 27, 1987) was a Tanzanian author writing in the Swahili language.

She was born in Dodoma and attended primary and secondary school there. Balisidya received a BA from the University of East Africa at Dar es Salaam in 1970 and a MA in oral literature from the University of Dar es Salaam in 1978. She obtained her PhD in African literature from the University of Wisconsin–Madison in November 1987.

From 1977 to 1987, she was a lecturer in the Kiswahili department of the University of Dar es Salaam.

In 1971, she was elected to the Swahili National Council of Tanzania; she served two terms as vice-chairman of the council.

Balisidya died at the age of 40 from cancer.

== Selected works ==
- Shida ("Hardships"), novel
- Ayubu ("Job"), play
- Tujifunze Kusoma ("Let's learn to read"), children's book
