= Everlyn Nicodemus =

Tanzanian artist, writer and curator (born 1954)

- Born: 1954 (age 70–71); Marangu, Kilimanjaro, Tanzania.
- Education: Stockholm University (1978–1982), Berlin University of the Arts (1988), Middlesex University (2007–2012)
- Known for: Painting; collage; mixed media; poetry; curation
- Spouse(s): Unknown (divorced); Kristian Romare (died 2015)
- Awards: Freelands Award (2022)

Everlyn Nicodemus is a Tanzanian-born artist, writer, and curator, based in Edinburgh, Scotland.

== Early life and career ==
Nicodemus initially enrolled in teacher training school, but eloped to marry a Swedish economist working in Tanzania. The pair moved to Sweden in 1973, where, influenced by her experiences of everyday racism, she enrolled in Stockholm University in 1978 to study social anthropology.

While back in Tanzania doing fieldwork, Nicodemus started making art in response to her discomfort with anthropology. This quickly led to a solo exhibition of paintings and poems at the National Museum of Tanzania in Dar es Salaam in 1980.

After divorcing her first husband, Nicodemus married Kristian Romare, a Swedish art historian, with whom she moved to Edinburgh in 2008.

Her work includes paintings, collages, mixed-media assemblages, and poetry, and has been informed by racism, trauma, PTSD, and recovery. She completed her PhD on African Modern Art and Black Cultural Trauma at Middlesex University in 2012.

Nicodemus won the Freelands Foundation Award in 2022, which supported the first retrospective of her work, at the National Galleries of Scotland, from September 2024 to May 2025. Her painting Självporträtt, Åkersberga was acquired by the National Portrait Gallery, London in 2022, and became the first painted self-portrait by a black female artist in the gallery's collection.
