= Imani Sanga =

Tanzanian musician and ethnomusicologist

Imani Sanga is Professor of Music in the Department of Creative Arts, formerly called Department of Fine and Performing Arts, in the College of Humanities at the University of Dar es Salaam, Tanzania. He teaches courses in Ethnomusicology, Philosophy of Music, Composition and Choral Music. And he conducts the university choir.

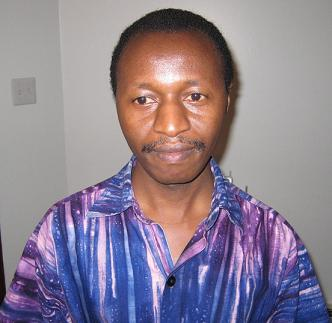
Imani Sanga in 2007

== Life ==
Born in 1972, Imani Sanga was educated at Kidugala Lutheran Seminary, University of Dar es Salaam. He earned his BA in 1999 and MA in 2001, both from the University of Dar es Salaam. He earned his PhD degree from the University of KwaZulu-Natal in 2006. He wrote his PhD dissertation entitled Muziki wa Injili: Temporal and Spatial Aesthetics of Popular Church Music in Dar es Salaam, Tanzania (1980s–2005) under the supervision of Professor Beverly Parker.

=== Books ===
2010

- Sounds of Muziki wa Injili: Temporal and Spatial Aesthetics of Contemporary Church Music in Dar es Salaam, Tanzania. (Lambert Academic Publishing) This book focuses on Muziki wa Injili (gospel music), one of the newer music genres in Tanzania.

1996

- Nyimbo za Tanzania. Published by the Finnish-Tanzanian Friendship Society, Helsinki This book is a songbook collection of Sanga's earlier compositions and arrangements of traditional songs.
