= John Kilaka =

Tanzanian writer and illustrator (born 1966)

- Born: 1966 (age 59–60); Sumbawanga, Tanzania
- Occupations: Writer and Illustrator
- Known for: creator of children's picture books

John Kilaka (born 4 November 1966 in Sumbawanga, southwest Tanzania) is a Tanzanian writer and illustrator, best known as a creator of children's picture books.

Kilaka is an artist, storyteller, and enthusiast of folklore. When Kilaka was young he dabbled in painting and soon realized that he needed to make his way to Dar es Salaam for an education. There he got familiar with Tingatinga painting and today he is a front figure. He debuted as a book illustrator with Fresh Fish. The book was an international success as well as True Friends which received the New Horizon award at the 2004 Bologna Children's Book Fair.

In 2004, Kilaka was awarded the Peter Pan Silver Star (Peter Pans silverstjärna) for his work with Fresh Fish. His latest book is The Amazing Tree (2009), which was translated to many languages, e.g. Swedish by Britt Isaksson under the title Förtrollad frukt. This book was also awarded the Silver Star, in 2011. All three books are fables that praise friendship.
