= Heinemann African Writers Series =

Series of books published by Heinemann

- African Writers Series colophon, which was intended to look like an Africanised version of Heinemann's windmill logo, as well as incorporating the letters A.W.
- Parent company: Heinemann
- Founded: 1962; 64 years ago
- Country of origin: United Kingdom
- Key people: Alan Hill; Chinua Achebe; Van Milne; Keith Sambrook; Aigboje Higo; Henry Chakava; James Currey

The African Writers Series (AWS) is a collection of books written by African novelists, poets and politicians. Published by Heinemann, 359 books appeared in the series between 1962 and 2003.

The series has provided an international audience for many African writers, including Chinua Achebe, Ngũgĩ wa Thiong'o, Steve Biko, Ama Ata Aidoo, Nadine Gordimer, Buchi Emecheta, and Okot p'Bitek.

== History ==
1958 – William Heinemann publishes Chinua Achebe's Things Fall Apart. 2,000 hardcover copies were printed and sold at a price of 15 shillings. The book receives widespread acclaim.

1959 – Alan Hill, head of Heinemann's educational department, visits West Africa. He finds that Achebe remains largely unknown in his home country of Nigeria due to the small print run and high price of his first novel.

1960 – Heinemann Educational Books (HEB) is set up as a separate company run by Alan Hill with Tony Beal as his deputy, and begins to publicise Achebe in Africa. They start to receive manuscripts from other African authors. Alan Hill recruits Evan McKay Milne, known as Van Milne, a West Africa specialist. He becomes HEB's Overseas Director.

1961 – Van Milne originates the idea of the African Writers Series. Hill explains that the plan was "to start a paperback series, confined to black African authors; the books were to be attractively designed with high quality production, and sold at a very cheap price—as low as 25p at the outset".

1962 – Alan Hill, Tony Beal and Van Milne launch the African Writers Series with a paperback edition of Things Fall Apart, followed by Cyprian Ekwensi's Burning Grass, and then Kenneth Kaunda's autobiography Zambia Shall Be Free. Chinua Achebe is appointed Editorial Advisor with a salary of £150 a year. This is increased to £250 in 1967.

1963 – Van Milne leaves Heinemann and is replaced by Keith Sambrook.

1964 – Sambrook is concerned that the early selections for the series will not reach the educational market, particularly after the inclusion of Zambia Shall Be Free. He begins collaborating with African and non-African academics to produce publications that would more clearly meet this aim. The first result is A Book of African Verse, edited by Clive Wake and John Reed, teachers at the University College of Rhodesia.

1965 – Aigboje Higo is appointed as manager of HEB Nigeria.

1967 – James Currey is appointed to work with Keith Sambrook to develop the series.

1970 – Henry Chakava is appointed as editor of HEB East Africa and becomes managing director in 1975.

1972 – Chinua Achebe leaves his position following the publication of his short-story collection Girls At War as the hundredth book in the series. Sambrook, Currey, Higo and Chakava take over editorial duties collectively with the support of Akin Thomas, editorial director of HEB Nigeria.

1983 – Heinemann Group is taken over for the first time and goes through a series of takeovers in the coming years.

1984 – James Currey steps down after new management reduces new publications to only one or two a year. Of the 270 titles in the series, 15 are put out of print.

1986 – the series is relaunched by Vicky Unwin, who targets the western academic market due to the drop in spending in the African educational market.

1988 – Keith Sambrook steps down.

1992 – Caroline Avens begins to oversee the series, reducing the backlist and starting to publish more new authors.

1993 – Adewale Maja-Pearce appointed general editor.

1994 – Abdulrazak Gurnah appointed as editorial advisor.

2002 – Only 70 of the more than 300 titles in the series remain in print.

2003 – Heinemann announces that no new titles will be added to the series. By 2008, only 64 titles remain in print.

2022 - Abibiman Publishing announces they are relaunching the series in 2022 with the blessing of James Currey.

== Content ==
The African Writers Series reissued paperback editions of works previously only available as more expensive hardbacks, translated books that had been published in other languages, and published the first works of unknown writers.

The decision to reissue paperback editions of English-language hardbacks followed the early success of Chinua Achebe's Things Fall Apart and continued for many years. However, it became clear very quickly that there were not enough works in English, so translations began to be made from French of works by Ferdinand Oyono, Mongo Beti and others. This was followed by translations from Portuguese, Zulu, Swahili, Acholi, Sesotho, Afrikaans, Luganda, and Arabic.

At the same time, they published new authors. This started with Ngũgĩ, who helped to expand the reach of the series into East Africa.

This approach provided opportunities for authors from across most of Africa. More than 80 titles published in the series were by Nigerian writers, who were followed by South Africans, Kenyans, Ghanaians, and Zimbabweans. In the first two decades, nearly all were men and it was only in the 1990s that books by women began to appear regularly. Some exceptions to this are early books by Flora Nwapa and Buchi Emecheta.

Novels would make up the bulk of the series, but it extended to poetry, anthologies, short stories, autobiographies, drama, non fiction, and oral traditions.

== Design ==
Six AWS covers, showing the shift in design from 1962 to 1993

Between 1962 and 1986, all the books in the African Writers Series were colour-coded: orange for fiction, blue for non-fiction, and green for poetry and drama. While this highlighted the different genres, all books in the series during this period were numbered to give a clear indication that they belonged to a collection of works by African writers.

Some evolution in cover design did take place during these years. Between 1962 and 1965 a heavy black band was featured at the top of the covers, with a black-and-white illustration below. The black was then replaced by a solid orange block. Later a colophon was added that was intended to look like an Africanised version of Heinemann's windmill logo. In 1971, George Hallett was employed to produce cover photography, which began to replace the use of illustrations.

In 1986, the design was changed to appeal more in western markets. Orange was replaced by a white background with a boxed abstract image. In 1993, it was changed again to incorporate full-colour images.

The visual identity of the African Writers Series influenced local publishing efforts, such as the Malawi Writers Series.

== Reception ==
The African Writers Series includes five winners of the Nobel Prize for Literature: Wole Soyinka (1986), Naguib Mahfouz (1988), Nadine Gordimer (1991), Doris Lessing (2007), and Abdulrazak Gurnah (2021). Books in the series have also won the Commonwealth Prize, the NOMA Award for African Writing, the Caine Prize for African Writing, and Guardian Fiction Prize. In 2002, at a celebration of Africa's 100 Best Books of the Twentieth Century, Heinemann was given a prize, as 12 of the titles chosen were from the series.

== Bibliography ==
A definitive bibliography of the series was prepared by Nourdin Bejjit as part of his PhD research at the Open University and included in James Currey's book-length treatment of the series, with some additional information from Heinemann.

Number	Author	Year	Genre	Title
1	Achebe, Chinua	1962	Novel	Things Fall Apart
2	Ekwensi, Cyprian	1962	Novel	Burning Grass: a story of the Fulani of Northern Nigeria. Illustrated by A. Folarin; cover drawing by Dennis Duerden.
3	Achebe, Chinua	1963	Novel	No Longer at Ease. Illustrated by Bruce Onobrakpeya.
4	Kaunda, Kenneth D.	1962	Autobiography	Zambia Shall Be Free: an autobiography
5	Ekwensi, Cyprian	1963	Novel	People of the City. Revised edition. (Originally published London: Dakers, 1954.)
6	Abrahams, Peter	1963	Novel	Mine Boy. Illustrated by Ruth Yudelowitz. (London: Crisp, 1946; London: Faber, 1954; New York: Knopf, 1955.)
7	Ngũgĩ wa Thiong'o (as Ngugi, James)	1964	Novel	Weep Not, Child
8	Reed, John, Wake, Clive, eds	1964	Poetry	A Book of African Verse. Later edition published (1984) as New Book of African Verse.
9	Rive, Richard, ed.	1964	Short Stories	Modern African Prose. An anthology compiled and edited by Richard Rive. Illustrated by Albert Adams. Contributions by Peter Abrahams, Chinua Achebe, Es'kia Mphahlele, Abioseh Nicol, Richard Rive, Alfred Hutchinson, Efua Sutherland, Jonathan Kariara, Peter Clarke, Luis Bernardo Honwana, Jack Cope, Cyprian Ekwensi, Amos Tutuola, Camara Laye, James Matthews, Alf Wannenburgh, William Conton, Onuora Nzekwu, and Ngũgĩ wa Thiong'o.
10	Equiano, Olaudah	1967	Autobiography	Equiano's Travels: His Autobiography; The Interesting Narrative of the Life of Olaudah Equiano or Gustavus Vassa the African. Abridged and edited by Paul Edwards
11	Aluko, T. M.	1965	Novel	One Man, One Matchet
12	Conton, William	1964	Novel	The African. (Previously published London: Heinemann, 1960. Boston: Little Brown, 1960.)
13	Beti, Mongo	1964	Novel	Mission to Kala: a novel. Translated by Peter Green from the French novel Mission terminée (1957). US edition (New York, Macmillan) published as Mission Accomplished.
14	Rive, Richard, ed.	1963	Short Stories	Quartet: New Voices from South Africa. Short stories by Alex La Guma, James Matthews, Richard Rive and Alf Wannenburgh.
15	Cook, David	1965	Various	Origin East Africa: a Makerere anthology devised and edited by David Cook. Prose and verse.
16	Achebe, Chinua	1965	Novel	Arrow of God
17	Ngũgĩ wa Thiong'o (as Ngugi, James)	1965	Novel	The River Between
18	Obotunde Ijimere	1966	Plays	The Imprisonment of Obatala, and other plays.
19	Ekwensi, Cyprian	1966	Short Stories	Lokotown and Other Stories.
20	Gatheru, Mugo	1966	Autobiography	Child of Two Worlds.
21	Munonye, John	1966	Novel	The Only Son.
22	Peters, Lenrie	1966	Novel	The Second Round.
23	Beier, Ulli, ed.	1966	Folklore	The Origin of Life and Death: African creation myths.
24	Kachingwe, Aubrey	1966	Novel	No Easy Task.
25	Amadi, Elechi	1966	Novel	The Concubine.
26	Nwapa, Flora	1966	Novel	Efuru.
27	Selormey, Francis	1967	Novel	The Narrow Path.
28	Cook, David, Lee, Miles, eds	1968	Plays	Short East African Plays in English: Ten plays in English.
29	Oyono, Ferdinand	1966	Novel	Houseboy. Translated by John Reed from the French Une vie de boy
30	Aluko, T. M.	1967	Novel	One Man, One Wife.
31	Achebe, Chinua	1966	Novel	A Man of the People. (Originally published: Nigerian Printing and Publishing, 1959.)
32	Aluko, T. M.	1967	Novel	Kinsman and Foreman
33	Samkange, Stanlake	1967	Novel	On Trial for my Country
34	Pieterse, Cosmo, ed.	1968	Plays	Ten One-Act Plays. Includes "Encounter" by Kuldip Sondhi; "Yon Kon" by Pat Maddy; "The Game" by Femi Euba; "Blind Cyclos" by Ime Ikeddeh; "With Strings' by Kuldip Sondhi; "The Deviant" by Ganesh Bagchi; "Fusane's Trial" by Alfred Hutchinson; "The Opportunity" by Arthur Maimane; "Maama" by Kwesi Kay; and "The Occupation" by Athol Fugard
35	La Guma, Alex	1967	Short Stories	A Walk in the Night and other stories.
36	Ngũgĩ wa Thiong'o (as Ngugi, James)	1967	Novel	A Grain of Wheat.
37	Peters, Lenrie	1967	Poetry	Satellites
38	Oginga Odinga	1967	Autobiography	Not Yet Uhuru: the autobiography of Oginga Odinga. With a foreword by Kwame Nkrumah.
39	Oyono, Ferdinand	1969	Novel	The Old Man and the Medal. Translated by John Reed from the French Le vieux nègre et la médaille.
40	Konadu, Asare	1967	Novel	A Woman in Her Prime
41	Djoleto, Amu	1968	Novel	The Strange Man.
42	Awoonor, Kofi and Adali-Mortty, G.	1970	Poetry	Messages: Poems from Ghana.
43	Armah, Ayi Kwei	1969	Novel	The Beautyful Ones Are Not Yet Born. (Boston: Houghton Mifflin, 1968.)
44	Amadi, Elechi	1969	Novel	The Great Ponds.
45	Munonye, John	1969	Novel	Obi.
46	Brutus, Dennis	1968	Poetry	Letters to Martha: and other poems from a South African prison.
47	Salih, Tayeb	1969	Short Stories	The Wedding of Zein, and other stories. London; printed in Malta: HEB, 1969. Translated by Denys Johnson-Davies from the Arabic, and illustrated by Ibrahim Salahi.
48	Gbadamosi, Bakare; Beier, Ulli	1968	Folklore	Not Even God Is Ripe Enough. Translated from the Yoruba
49	Nkrumah, Kwame	1968	Nonfiction	Neo-colonialism: the last stage of imperialism. (Originally published London: Nelson, 1965)
50	Clark, J. P.	1968	Nonfiction	America: Their America. London: HEB in association with Andre Deutsch. (Originally published London: Deutsch, 1964.)
51	Ngũgĩ wa Thiong'o (as Ngugi, James)	1968	Play	The Black Hermit.
52	Sellassie, B. M. Sahle	1969	Novel	The Afersata: an Ethiopian novel.
53	Palangyo, Peter K.	1968	Novel	Dying in the Sun.
54	Serumaga, Robert	1970	Novel	Return to the Shadows.
55	Konadu, Asare	1969	Novel	Ordained by the Oracle. Originally published as Come Back Dora, Accra: Anowuo Educational Publ.
56	Nwapa, Flora	1970	Novel	Idu.
57	Dipoko, Mbella Sonne	1969	Novel	Because of Women.
58	Beier, Ulli, ed.	1969	Short Stories	Political Spider: an anthology of stories from "Black Orpheus".
59	Asare, Bediako	1971	Novel	Rebel.
60	Honwana, Luís Bernardo	1969	Short Stories	We Killed Mangy Dog and Other Stories. Translated from the Portuguese by Dorothy Guedes.
61	Umeasiegbu, Rems Nna	1969	Folklore	The Way We Lived: Ibo customs and stories.
62	Okigbo, Christopher	1971	Poetry	Labyrinths. With Path of Thunder.
63	Ousmane, Sembene	1970	Novel	God's Bits of Wood. Translated by Francis Price.
64	Pieterse, Cosmo, ed.	1971	Poetry	7 South African Poets: poems of exile. Collected and selected by Cosmo Pieterse.
66	Salih, Tayeb	1969	Novel	Season of Migration to the North. Translated by Denys Johnson-Davies from the Arabic Mawsim al-hijrah ilā al-shamāl.
67	Nwankwo, Nkem	1970	Novel	Danda. (Originally published London: Deutsch, 1964)
68	Okara, Gabriel	1970	Novel	The Voice. Introduction by Arthur Ravenscroft. (Originally published London: Deutsch, 1964)
69	Liyong, Taban lo	1969	Short Stories	Fixions, and other stories.
70	Aluko, T. M.	1970	Novel	Chief, The Honourable Minister.
71	Senghor, Léopold Sédar	1969	Poetry	Nocturnes. Translated by John Reed and Clive Wake from the French.
72	U'tamsi, Felix	1970	Poetry	Selected Poems. Translated by Gerald Moore from the French.
73	Ortzen, Len, ed.	1970	Various	North African Writing. Selected, translated, and with an introduction by Len Ortzen.
74	Liyong, Taban lo, ed.	1970	Nonfiction	Eating Chiefs: Lwo culture from Lolwe to Malkal. Selected, interpreted and transmuted by Taban lo Liyong.
75	Knappert, Jan	1970	Folklore	Myths and Legends of the Swahili.
76	Soyinka, Wole	1970	Novel	The Interpreters. With introduction and notes by Eldred Jones. London: Heinemann. (Originally published London: Deutsch, 1965.)
77	Beti, Mongo	1970	Novel	King Lazarus: a novel. Translated from the French Le roi miraculé (French version originally published Editions Buchet, 1958.)
78	Pieterse, Cosmo	1972	Plays	Short African plays. Including: "Ancestral Power" by Kofi Awoonor; "Magic Pool" by Kuldip Sondhi; "God's Deputy" by Sanya Dosunmu; "Resurrection" by Richard Rive; "Life Everlasting" by Pat Amadu Maddy; "Lament" by Kofi Awoonor; "Ballad of the Cells" by Cosmo Pieterse; "Overseas" by Mbella Sonne Dipoko; "This Time Tomorrow" by Ngũgĩ wa Thiong'o; "Episodes of an Easter Rising" by David Lytton
79	Chraibi, Driss	1972	Novel	Heirs to the Past. Translated by Len Ortzen from the French.(Succession ouverte originally published Paris: Denoël, 1962.)
80	Farah, Nuruddin	1970	Novel	From a Crooked Rib.
81	Mboya, Tom	1970	Nonfiction	The Challenge of Nationhood: a collection of speeches and writings. Foreword by H. E. Mzee Jomo Kenyatta, and postscript by Pamela Mboya.
82	Dipoko, Mbella Sonne	1970	Novel	A Few Nights and Days. (Originally published, Harlow: Longmans, 1966.)
83	Knappert, Jan	1971	Folklore	Myths and Legends of the Congo. Nairobi: HEB.
84	Ekwensi, Cyprian	1971	Novel	Beautiful Feathers. (Originally published London: Hutchinson, 1963)
85	Onuora Nzekwu	1971	Novel	Wand of Noble Wood.
86	Bebey, Francis	1971	Novel	Agatha Moudio's Son. Translated by Joyce A. Hutchinson from the French Le fils d'Agatha Moudio.
87	Dadié, Bernard B.	1971	Novel	Climbié. Translated by Karen C. Chapman from the French.
88	Beti, Mongo	1971	Novel	The Poor Christ of Bomba. Translated by Gerald Moore from the French Le pauvre Christ de Bombay. (Original French edition published 1956.)
89	Maddy, Pat Amadu	1971	Plays	Obasai and other plays.
90	Liyong, Taban lo	1971		Frantz Fanon's Uneven Ribs: poems more and more.
91	Nzekwu, Onuora	1972	Novel	Blade Among the Boys. (Originally published London: Hutchinson, 1962.)
92	Ousmane, Sembène	1972	Novella	The Money-Order; with, White Genesis. Translated by Clive Wake. London: Heinemann. (Translation of Vehi ciosane; ou, Blanche-genèse; suivi du Mandat, Paris: Présence Africaine, 1965.)
93	Knappert, Jan, ed.	1972	Poetry	A Choice of Flowers. Chaguo la Maua: an anthology of Swahili love poetry. Edited and translated from Swahili by Jan Knappert.
94	Munonye, John	1971	Novel	Oil Man of Obange.
95	Ibrahim, Sonallah	1971	Short Stories	The Smell Of It, and other stories. Translated from the Arabic by Denys Johnson-Davies.
96	Cook, David, Rubadiri, David, eds	1971	Poetry	Poems from East Africa.
97	Mazrui, Ali A.	1971	Novel	The Trial of Christopher Okigbo.
98	Mulaisho, Dominic	1971	Novel	The Tongue of the Dumb.
99	Ouologuem, Yambo	1971	Novel	Bound to Violence. Translated by Ralph Manheim from the French Devoi de violence. (Originally published London: Secker & Warburg, 1971.)
100	Achebe, Chinua	1972	Short Stories	Girls At War and Other Stories.
101	Head, Bessie	1972	Novel	Maru.
102	Omotoso, Kole	1971	Novel	The Edifice.
103	Peters, Lenrie	1971	Poetry	Katchikali. Poems.
104	Themba, Can	1972	Short Stories	The Will to Die. Selected by Donald Stuart and Roy Holland.
105	Lubega, Bonnie	1971	Novel	The Outcasts.
106	Reed, John, Wake, Clive, eds.	1972	Poetry	French African verse. With English translations by John Reed & Clive Wake.
107	Dipoko, Mbella Sonne	1972	Poetry	Black and White in Love: poems.
108	Awoonor, Kofi	1972	Novel	This Earth, My Brother. (Originally published Garden City: Doubleday, 1971.)
109	Obiechina, Emmanuel N.	1972		Onitsha Market Literature.
110	La Guma, Alex	1972	Novel	In the Fog of the Seasons' End.
111	Angira, Jared	1972	Poetry	Silent Voices: poems.
112	Vambe, Lawrence	1972	Nonfiction	An Ill-Fated People: Zimbabwe before and after Rhodes. (Originally published with a foreword by Doris Lessing, London: Heinemann, 1972.)
113	Mezu, S. Okechukwu	1971	Novel	Behind the Rising Sun.
114	Pieterse, Cosmo	1972	Plays	Five African Plays.
115	Brutus, Dennis	1973	Poetry	A Simple Lust: selected poems including Sirens Knuckles Boots; Letters to Martha; Poems from Algiers; Thoughts Abroad.
116	Liyong, Taban lo	1972	Poetry	Another Nigger Dead: poems.
117	Hakim, Tawfiq al-	1973	Plays	Fate of a Cockroach: four plays of freedom. Selected and translated from the Arabic by Denys Johnson-Davies.
118	Amadu, Malum	1972	Folklore	Amadu's Bundle: Fulani tales of love and djinns. Collected by Malum Amadu; edited by Gulla Kell and translated into English by Ronald Moody.
119	Kane, Hamidou	1972	Novel	Ambiguous Adventure. Translated from the French by Katherine Woods. (This translation originally published New York: Walker, 1963. Translation of L'Aventure ambiguë. Paris: Julliard, 1962.)
120	Achebe, Chinua	1970	Poetry	Beware, Soul Brother. Revised and enlarged edition.
121	Munonye, John	1973	Novel	A Wreath for Maidens.
122	Omotoso, Kole	1972	Novel	The Combat.
123	Mandela, Nelson	1973	Autobiography	No Easy Walk to Freedom.
124	Dikobe, Modikwe	1973	Novel	The Marabi Dance.
125	Worku, Daniachew	1973	Novel	The Thirteenth Sun.
126	Cheney-Coker, Syl	1973	Poetry	Concerto for an Exile: poems.
127	Henderson, Gwyneth, Pieterse, Cosmo, eds	1973	Plays	Nine African Plays for Radio.
128	Zwelonke, D. M.	1973	Novel	Robben Island.
129	Egudu, Romanus, Nwoga, Donatus, eds	1973	Poetry	Igbo Traditional Verse. Compiled and translated by Romanus Egudu and Donatus Nwoga. (Originally published 1971 as Poetic Heritage.)
130	Aluko, T. M.	1973	Novel	His Worshipful Majesty.
131	Lessing, Doris	1973	Novel	The Grass is Singing
132	Bown, Lalage	1973	Nonfiction	Two Centuries of African English: a survey and anthology of non-fictional English prose by African writers since 1769.
133	Mukasa, Ham	1975	Nonfiction	Sir Apolo Kagwa Discovers Britain. Edited by Taban lo Liyong. (First published in 1904 as Uganda's Katikiro in England.)
134	Henderson, Gwyneth, ed.	1973	Plays	African Theatre: eight prize-winning plays for radio. Includes "Make Like Slaves" by Richard Rive; "Station Street" by A. K. Mustapha; "Sweet Scum of Freedom" by J. Singh; "Double Attack" by C. C. Umeh; "Scholarship Woman" by D. Clems; "The Transistor Radio" by K. Tsaro-Wiwa; "Family Spear" by E. N. Zirimu; and "Sign of the Rainbow" by W. Ogunyemi.
135	Maran, René	1973	Novel	Batouala. Translated by Barbara Beck and Alexandre Mboukou; introduction by Donald E. Herdeck.
136	Sekyi, Kobina	1974		The Blinkards.
137	Maddy, Yulisa Amadu	1973		No Past, No Present, No Future.
138	Owusu, Martin	1973	Plays	The Sudden Return, and other plays.
139	Ruheni, Mwangi	1973	Novel	The Future Leaders.
140	Amadi, Elechi	1973	Nonfiction	Sunset in Biafra: a civil war diary.
141	Nortje, Arthur	1973	Poetry	Dead Roots. Poems.
142	Sembène, Ousmane	1974	Short Stories	Tribal Scars and other stories. Translated from the French by Len Ortzen.
143	Mwangi, Meja	1973		Kill Me Quick.
144	Fall, Malick	1973		The Wound. Translated by Clive Wake from the French La plaie.
145	Mwangi, Meja	1974		Carcase for Hounds.
146	Ekwensi, Cyprian	1975		Jagua Nana. (Originally published, London: Hutchinson, 1961.)
147	p'Bitek, Okot	1974		The Horn of My Love.
148	Aniebo, I. N. C.	1974		The Anonymity of Sacrifice.
149	Head, Bessie	1974		A Question of Power. (Originally published London: Davis-Poynter, 1974.)
150	Ngũgĩ wa Thiong'o	1975		Secret Lives, and other stories.
151	Mahfouz, Naguib	1975		Midaq Alley. Translated from the Arabic by Trevor Le Gassick.
152	La Guma, Alex	1974		The Stone-Country. (Originally published 1967.)
153	Munonye, John	1975	Novel	A Dancer of Fortune.
154	Armah, Ayi Kwei	1974		Fragments.
155	Armah, Ayi Kwei	1974	Novel	Why Are We So Blest?: a novel.
156	Ruheni, Mwangi	1975		The Minister's Daughter.
157	Kayper-Mensah, A. W.	1975		The Drummer in Our Time.
158	Kahiga, Samuel	1974		The Girl From Abroad.
159	Mvungi, Martha	1975		Three Solid Stones.
160	Mwase, George Simeon	1975		Strike a Blow and Die: the classic story of the Chilembwe Rising. Edited and introduced by Robert I. Rotberg.
161	Djoleto, Amu	1975	Novel	Money Galore.
162	Kayira, Legson	1974		The Detainee.
163	Sellassie, B. M. Sahle	1974		Warrior King.
164	Royston, Robert	1974		Black Poets in South Africa.
165	Etherton, Michael, ed.	1975	Plays	African Plays for Playing. Plays by Nuwa Sentongo, Jacob Hevi & Segun Ajibade. Selected and edited by Michael Etherton. London: Heinemann.
166	De Graft, Joe	1975		Beneath the Jazz and Brass.
167	Rabearivelo, Jean-Joseph	1975	Poetry	Translations from the Night: selected poems of Jean-Joseph Rabearivelo. Edited with English translations by Clive Wake and John Reed.
168	Echewa, T. Obinkaram	1976		The Land's Lord.
169	Samkange, Stanlake	1975		The Mourned One.
170	Mungoshi, Charles	1975		Waiting for the Rain.
171	Soyinka, Wole, ed.	1975	Poetry	Poems of Black Africa. Edited and introduced by Wole Soyinka.
172	Ekwensi, Cyprian	1975		Restless City and Christmas Gold.
173	Nwankwo, Nkem	1975	Novel	My Mercedes is Bigger Than Yours.
174	Diop, David Mandessi	1975		Hammer Blows. Translated from the French and edited by Simon Mpondo and Frank Jones. London: Heinemann.
175	Ousmane, Sembène	1976		Xala. Translated from the French by Clive Wake. As Xala: roman, Paris: Présence Africaine, 1973.
176	Mwangi, Meja	1976		Going Down River Road.
177	Gordimer, Nadine	1976		Some Monday for Sure.
178	Peteni, R. L.	1976		Hill of Fools.
179	Etherton, Michael (ed.)	1976	Plays	African Plays for Playing 2. Includes Monkey on the tree by Uwa Udensi, Black mamba two by Godfrey Kabwe Kasoma and The tradedy of Mr. No-balance by Victor Eleame Musinga.
180	Senghor, Léopold Sédar	1976	Various	Prose and Poetry. Selected and translated from French by John Reed and Clive Wake.
181	Beti, Mongo	1978		Perpetua and the Habit of Unhappiness. Translated by Clive Wake and John Reed from the French Perpétue et l'habitude du malheur (originally published Paris: Editions Buchet-Chastel, 1974).
182	Head, Bessie	1977		The Collector of Treasures.
183	Okara, Gabriel	1978		The Fisherman's Invocation.
184	Farah, Nuruddin	1976		A Naked Needle.
185	Ekwensi, Cyprian	1976		Survive the Peace.
186	Boateng, Yaw M.	1977		The Return.
187	Rugyendo, Mukotani	1977	Plays	Barbed Wire and Other Plays.
188	Ngũgĩ wa Thiong'o	1977		Petals of Blood.
189	Iroh, Eddie	1976		Forty-eight Guns for the General
190	Samkange, Stanlake	1978		Year of the Uprising
191	Thiong'o, Ngũgĩ wa & Mugo, Micere Githae	1976		The Trial of Dedan Kimathi
192	Jahadmy, Ali A. (ed.)	1977	Poetry	Anthology of Swahili Poetry. Parallel Swahili text and English translation. Selected and translated by Ali A. Jahadmy.
193	p'Bitek, Okot	1978	Folklore	Hare and Hornbill. Compiled and translated from the Acholi by Okot p'Bitek.
194	Armah, Ayi Kwei	1979	Novel	The Healers: an historical novel.
195	Munonye, John	1978	Novel	Bridge to a Wedding.
196	Johnson-Davies, Denys (ed.)	1978	Short Stories	Egyptian short stories. Includes "House of flesh" by Yusuf Idris, "Grandad Hasan" by Yahya Taher Abdullah, "Within the walls" by Edward El-Kharrat, "The performer" by Ibrahim Aslan, "The whistle" by Abdul Hakim Kassem, "Suddenly it rained" by Baha Taher, "The man who saw the sole of his left foot in a cracked mirror" by Lutfi Al-Khouli, "A conversation from the third floor" by Mohamed El-Bisatie, "Yusuf Murad Morcos" by Nabil Gorgy, "The conjurer made off with the dish" by Naguib Mahfouz, "The accusation" by Suleiman Fayyad, "A place under the dome" by Abdul Rahman Fahmy, "The country boy" by Yusuf Sibai, "The snake" by Sonallah Ibrahim, "The crush of life" by Yusuf Sharouni, "A story from prison" by Yahya Hakki & "The child and the king" by Gamil Atia Ibrahim.
197	Mahfouz, Naguib	1978		Miramar. Edited and revised by Maged el Kommos and John Rodenbeck; introduced by John Fowles.
198	Cabral, Amilcar	1979	Nonfiction	Unity and Struggle: speeches and writings. Texts selected by the PAIGC; translated from Portuguese by Michael Wolfers.
199	Sassine, Williams	1980		Wirriyamu. Translated from the French by John Reed and Clive Wake.
200	Ngũgĩ wa Thiong'o	1982		Devil on the Cross.
201	Plaatje, Sol T.	1978		Mhudi: an epic of South African native life a hundred years ago. (New York: Negro Univ. Press, 1970; Johannesburg: Quagga Press, Ad. Donker, 1975; London: Rex Collings, 1976; Washington, DC: Three Continents Press, 1978).
202	Vieira, José Luandino	1978	Novella	The Real Life of Domingos Xavier. Translated from the Portuguese by Michael Wolfers.
203	Njau, Rebeka	1978		Ripples in the Pool. (Nairobi: Transafrica, 1975.)
204	Mulaisho, Dominic	1979		The Smoke that Thunders
205	Bebey, Francis	1978		The Ashanti Doll. Translated from the French by Joyce A. Hutchinson.
206	Aniebo, I. N. C.	1978		The Journey Within.
207	Marechera, Dambudzo	1978		The House of Hunger.
208	Brutus, Dennis	1978	Poetry	Stubborn Hope: new poems and selections.
209	Idris, Yusuf	1978	Short Stories	The Cheapest Nights, and other stories. Translated from the Arabic by Wadida Wassef.
210	Amadi, Elechi	1978		The Slave.
211	Kunene, Mazisi	1979		Emperor Shaka the great: a Zulu epic. Translated from the Zulu by the author.
212	La Guma, Alex	1979		Time of the Butcherbird. (Heinemann, 1979)
213	Iroh, Eddie	1979		Toads of War.
214	Beti, Mongo	1980		Remember Ruben. Translated from the French by Gerald Moore. (Originally published Ibadan: New Horn, 1980.)
215	Wolfers, Michael (ed.)	1979	Poetry	Poems from Angola. Selected, translated and introduced by Michael Wolfers.
216	Yirenkyi, Asiedu	1980	Plays	Kivuli and other plays.
217	Biko, Steve	1979		I Write What I Like: a selection of his writings. Edited by Aelred Stubbs.
218	Armah, Ayi Kwei	1979		Two Thousand Seasons.
219	Kenyatta, Jomo	1979	Nonfiction	Facing Mount Kenya: the traditional life of the Gikuyu. With an introduction by B. Malinowski. (Originally published London: Secker and Warburg, 1938.)
220	Head, Bessie	1981		Serowe: Village of the Rain Wind.
221	Cheney-Coker, Syl	1980	Poetry	The Graveyard Also Has Teeth, with Concerto for an Exile: poems.
222	Vieira, José Luandino	1980	Short Stories	Luuanda. Translated from the Portuguese by Tamara L. Bender.
223	Ghanem, Fathy	1980	Novel	The Man who Lost his Shadow: a novel in four books. Translated from the Arabic by Desmond Stewart.
224	Kente, Gibson (ed.)	1981	Plays	South African People's Plays. Includes uNosilimela by Credo V. Mutwa, Shanti by Mthuli Shezi, Too Late by Gibson Kente & Survival by the Workshop '71 Theatre Company.
225	Mahfouz, Naguib	1981		Children of Gebelawi.
226	Farah, Nuruddin	1980		Sweet and Sour Milk. (Originally published London: Allison & Busby, 1979.)
227	Emecheta, Buchi	1979		The Joys of Motherhood. (Originally published London: Allison & Busby, 1979.)
228	Hussein, Taha	1981	Autobiography	An Egyptian Childhood: the autobiography of Taha Hussein. Translated by E. H. Paxton.
229	Mofolo, Thomas	1981	Novel	Chaka: an historical romance. New translation by Daniel P. Kunene. Originally translated from the Sesuto by F. H. Dutton, London & New York: OUP, 1967.
230	Feinberg, Barry (ed.)	1980	Poetry	Poets to the People: South African Freedom Poems.
231	Jumbam, Kenjo	1980		White Man of God.
232	Johnson-Davies, Denys (ed.)	1981	Plays	Egyptian One-act Plays. Selected and translated from the Arabic by Denys Johnson-Davies. Includes The interrogation by Farid Kamil, The Trap by Alfred Farag, Marital bliss by Abdel-Moneim Selim, The Wheat Well by Ali Salem, and The Donkey Market by Tewfik al-Hakim.
233	Nyamfukudza, S.	1980		The Non-Believer's Journey
234	Kunene, Mazisi	1981		Anthem of the Decades: a Zulu epic. Translated from Zulu by the author.
235	Kunene, Mazisi	1982		The Ancestors and the Sacred Mountain: poems. Translated from Zulu.
236	Mapanje, Jack	1981		Of Chameleons and Gods
237	Marechera, Dambudzo	1980		Black Sunlight.
238	Peters, Lenrie	1981	Poetry	Selected Poetry
239	Kourouma, Ahmadou	1981		The Suns of Independence. Translated from the French Les soleils des independances by Adrian Adams.
240	Ngũgĩ wa Thiong'o	1981		Detained: A Writers Prison Diary
241	Akare, Thomas	1981		The Slums.
242	Aluko, T. M.	1982		Wrong Ones in the Dock.
243	Mutloatse, Mothobi (ed.)	1981	Various	Africa South: contemporary writings.
244	Ya-Otto, John with Ole Gjerstad and Michael Mercer	1982		Battlefront Namibia: an autobiography
245	NEVER ASSIGNED.			
246	Thiong'o, Ngũgĩ wa	1982		I Will Marry When I Want.
247	Head, Bessie	1987		When Rain Clouds Gather
248	Bâ, Mariama	1981	Novel	So Long a Letter. Translated from the French Si longue lettre by Modupé Bodé-Thomas.
249	Obasanjo, Olusegun	1981	Autobiography	My Command: An Account of the Nigerian Civil War, 1967-1970.
250	Ousmane, Sembène	1981		The Last of the Empire.
251	Lewin, Hugh	1981		Bandiet: Seven Years in a South African Prison.
252	Farah, Nuruddin	1982		Sardines. (Originally published London: Allison & Busby, 1981.)
253	Aniebo, I. N. C.	1983	Short Stories	Of Wives, Talismans, and the Dead: short stories. Arranged by Willfred F. Feuser. London; Exeter, N.H.: Heinemann.
254	Scanlon, Paul A. (ed.)	1983	Short Stories	Stories from central and southern Africa. Includes "Beggar my neighbour" by Dan Jacobson, "Kwashiorkor" by Can Themba, "About a girl who met a dimo" by Susheela Curtis, "Hajji Musa and the Hindu fire-walker" by Ahmed Essop, "The sisters" by Pauline Smith, "Tselane and the giant" by B. L. Leshoai, "Johannesburg, Johannesburg" by Nathaniel Nakasa, "Coming of the dry season" by Charles Mungoshi, "A soldier's embrace" by Nadine Gordimer, "Witchcraft" by Bessie Head, "The old woman" by Luis B. Honwana, "Dopper and Papist" by Herman C. Bosman, "The dishonest chief" by Ellis Singano and A. A. Roscoe, "The Soweto bride" by Mbulelo Mzamane, "A sunrise on the veld" by Doris Lessing, "The soldier without an ear" by Paul Zeleza, "Riva" by Richard Rive, "Sunlight in Trebizond Street" by Alan Paton, "The Christmas reunion" by Dambudzo Marechera, "The king of the waters" by A. C. Jordan, "Power" by Jack Cope, and "In corner B" by Es'kia (Zeke) Mphahlele.
255	Iroh, Eddie	1982		The Siren in the Night.
256	Bruner, Charlotte H. (ed.)	1983	Various	Unwinding Threads: Writing by Women in Africa. Later edition published 1994.
257	Calder, Angus, Jack Mapanje & Cosmo Peterse	1983	Poetry	Summer Fires: New Poetry of Africa.
258	Pheto, Molefe	1985	Autobiography	And Night Fell: Memoirs of a Political Prisoner in South Africa. (Originally published London: Allison & Busby, 1983.)
259	NEVER PUBLISHED			"A volume called This is the Time was advertised as No. 259, but no such volume exists in any of the library catalogues we consulted. Research in the AWS archive at Reading University reveals that this was a projected anthology of Central and Southern African poetry, which was instead published as When My Brothers Come Home: Poems from Central and Southern Africa, edited by Frank M. Chipasula (Middleton, Conn.: Wesleyan University Press, 1985)."
260	NEVER PUBLISHED			"Kofi Awoonor's Until the Morning After: Collected Poems 1963-1985 was to have been AWS number 260, but was apparently withdrawn by the author and instead published by Greenfield Review Press, New York, in 1987."
261	Anyidoho, Kofi	1984	Poetry	A Harvest of our Dreams, with Elegy for the Revolution: poems.
262	Nagenda, John	1986		The Seasons of Thomas Tebo.
263	Serote, Mongane	1983		To Every Birth its Blood.
264	De Graft, Joe	1977		Muntu.
265	NEVER ASSIGNED.			
266	p'Bitek, Okot	1984		Song of Lawino: &, Song of Ocol. Translated from the Acholi by Okot p'Bitek. Introduction by G. A. Heron; illustrations by Frank Horle. London: Heinemann.
267	Idrīs, Yūsuf	1984		Rings of Burnished Brass.
268	Sepamia, Sepho	1981		A Ride on the Whirlwind: a novel.
269	Pepetela	1984	Novel	Mayombe.
270	Achebe, Chinua, & C. L. Innes (eds)	1985	Short Stories	African Short Stories. Includes "The false prophet" by Sembene Ousmane, "Certain winds from the south" by Ama Ata Aidoo, "The apprentice" by Odun Balogun, "The will of Allah" by David Owoyele, "Civil peace" by Chinua Achebe, "The gentlemen of the jungle" by Jomo Kenyatta, "The green leaves" by Grace Ogot, "Bossy" by Abdulrazak Gurnah, "The spider's web" by Leonard Kibera, "Minutes of glory" by Ngugi wa Thiong'o, "An incident in the Ghobashi household" by Alifa Rifaat, "A handful of dates" by Tayeb Salih, "A conversation from the third floor" by Mohamed El-Bisatie, "Papa, snake & I" by B. L. Honwana, "The bridegroom" by Nadine Gordimer, "The betrayal" by Ahmed Essop, "Protista" by Dambudzo Marechera, "The coffee-cart girl" by Ezekiel Mphahlele, "Snapshots of a wedding" by Bessie Head, and "Reflections in a cell" by Mafika Gwala.
unnumbered	Rifaat, Alifa	1985		Distant View of a Minaret.
unnumbered	Amadi, Elechi	1986		Estrangement.
unnumbered	Echewa, T Obinkaram	1986		The Crippled Dancer
unnumbered	Sembene, Ousmane	1987		Black Docker
unnumbered	Rive, Richard	1987		Buckingham Palace, District 6
unnumbered	Lopes, Henri	1987		Tribaliks
unnumbered	Tambo, Oliver	1987		Oliver Tambo Speaks: Preparing for Power
unnumbered	Achebe, Chinua	1988		Anthills of the Savanna
unnumbered	Karodia, Farida	1988	Short Stories	Coming Home and Other Stories, includes "Coming Home", "Something in the Air", "The Necklace", "Cardboard Mansions", "Ntombi", "iGoldi", "The Worlds According to Mrs Angela Ramsbotham", "Seeds of Discontent", "The Woman in Green"
unnumbered	Wangusa, Timothy	1989		Upon This Mountain
unnumbered	Mungoshi, Charles	1989		The Setting Sun and the Rolling World
unnumbered	Ngũgĩ wa Thiong'o	1989		Matigari
unnumbered	Vassanji, M. G.	1989		The Gunny Sack
unnumbered	Laing, Kojo	1989		Godhorse
unnumbered	Zimuya, Musaemura, Porter, Peter, Anyidoho, Kofi (eds)	1989		The Fate of Vultures, contributions by Afam Akeh, Gichora Mwangi, Ama Asantewa Ababio, Alex Agyei-Agyiri, Funso Aiyejina, Richard Afari Baafour, Biyi Bandele-Thomas, Philip Bateman, Charles Agboola Bodunde, John Murray Coates, James Putsch Commey, Jonathan Cumming, Achmat Dangor, Kofi Dondo, Patrick Ebewo, Godwin Ede, Ezenwa-Ohaeto, Bode-Law Faleyimu, Francis Faller, Femi Fatoba, Henry Garuba, Arthur K. de Graft-Rosenior, Martin Gwete, Chenjerai Hove, Esiaba Irobi, Frederick Bobor James, Beverley Jansen, Wumi Kaji, Ken Kamoche, Lawrence Karanja, Kolosa Kargbo, Boyo Lawal, Masango Lisongwe, Don Mattera, Zondi Mbano, Bennet Leboni, Buti Moleko, Lupenga Mphande, Edison Mpina, Fekessa Mwada, Crispin Namane, Valerie Nkomeshya, Pheroze Nowrojee, Silas Obadiah, Walter Odame, Tanure Ojaide, Felicity Atuki Okoth, Isi Omoifo, Thembile ka Pepeteka, Sobhna Keshval Poona, Kofi Sam, Gloria Sandak-Lewin, Erasmus Elikplim Forster Senaye, Sam Ukal, Michael Andrew Wakabi, Timothy Wangusa, Willie T. Zingani
unnumbered	Mahjoub, Jamal	1989		Navigation of a Rainmaker
unnumbered	Hove, Chenjerai	1990	Novel	Bones
unnumbered	Cheney-Coker, Syl	1990		The Last Harmattan of Alusine Dunbar
unnumbered	Chinodya, Shimmer	1990	Novel	Harvest of Thorns
unnumbered	Couto, Mia	1990		Voices Made Night
unnumbered	Gool, Reshard	1990		Cape Town Coolie
unnumbered	Head, Bessie	1990		A Woman Alone
unnumbered	Head, Bessie	1990		Tales of Tenderness and Power
unnumbered	Maja-Pearce, Adewale (ed)	1990		The Heinemann Book of African Poetry in English, contributions by Dennis Brutus, Marjorie Oludhe Macgoye, Christopher Okigbo, Lenrie Peters, Wole Soyinka, Kofi Awoonor, JP Clark Bekederemo, Syl Cheney-Coker, Arthur Nortje, Steve Chimombo, Jack Mapanje, Kojo Laing, Niyi Osundare, Tanure Ojaide, Musaemura Zimunya, Lupenga Mphande, Frank Chipasula, Molara Ogundipe-Leslie, Odia Ofeimun, Catherine Obianuju Acholonu, Chenjerai Hove, Gabriel Gbadamosi
unnumbered	Cheney-Coker, Syl	1990		The Blood in the Desert's Eye
unnumbered	Chipasula, Frank M.	1991		Whispers in the Wings
unnumbered	Amechi Akwanya	1991		Orimili
unnumbered	Gordimer, Nadine	1991	Short Stories	Crimes of Conscience: Selected Short Stories
unnumbered	Vassanji, M. G.	1993	Short Stories	Uhuru Street & other Stories, includes "In the Quiet of a Sunday Afternoon", "Ali", "Alzira", "The Beggar", "For a Shilling", "The Relief from Drill", "The Driver", "English Lessons", "The Sounds of the Night", "Leaving", "Breaking Loose", "What Good Times We Had", "Ebrahim and the Businessman", "The London-returned", "Refugee", "All Worlds are Possible Now".
unnumbered	Ojaide, Tanure	1991	Poetry	The Blood of Peace and other poems
unnumbered	Achebe, Chinua, & C. L. Innes (eds)	1992	Short Stories	Book of Contemporary African Short Stories
unnumbered	Osundare, Niyi	1992	Poetry	Selected Poems
unnumbered	Mwangi, Ursula	1992		Striving for the Wind
unnumbered	Laing, Kojo	1992		Major Gentl and Achimota Wars
unnumbered	Bandele-Thomas, Biyi	1992		The Man Who Came In From The Back Of Beyond
unnumbered	Ousmane, Sembene	1992		Niiwam and Taaw
unnumbered	Hove, Chenjerai	1992	Novel	Shadows
unnumbered	Zeleza, Tiyambe	1992		Smouldering Charcoal
unnumbered	Tuma, Hama	1993	Short Stories	The Case of the Socialist Witchdoctor and other stories includes "By Way of a Prologue", "The Case of the Illiterate Saboteur", "The Case of the Valliant Torturer", "The Case of the Criminal Thought", "The Case of the Queue Breaker", "The Case of the Treacherous Alphabet", "The Case of the Professor of Insanity", "The Case of the Closet Racist", "The Case of the Presumptuous Novelist", "The Case of the Prison-Mongerer", "The Case of the Incurable Hedonist", "Vendetta", "Betrayal", "It happened in Russia", "Death of a Renegade", "Tales of the Highway Fire", "The Professional", "The Zar Who Liked Human Liver", "In 'The Bar of No Surprises'", "Ten on the Terror Scale", "The Waldiba Story", "Madman, Killer, Saint, You".
unnumbered	Bandele-Thomas, Biyi	1993		The Sympathetic Undertaker and Other Dreams
unnumbered	Jacobs, Steve	1993		Under the Lion
unnumbered	Botha, W. P. B.	1993		The Reluctant Playwright
unnumbered	Karodia, Farida	1993		A Shattering of Silence
unnumbered	Bruner, Charlotte H. (ed.)	1993	Various	African Women's Writing, including contributions from Catherine Obianuju Acholonu, Ifeoma Okoye, Zaynab Alkali, Orlanda Amarilis, Aminata Maiga Ka, Awuor Ayoda, Violet Dias Lannoy, Daisy Kabagarama, Lina Magaia, Ananda Devi, Tsitsi Dangarembga, Bessie Head, Jean Marquard, Zoe Wicomb, Sheila Fugard, Farida Karodia, Nawal el Sadaawi, Assia Djebar, Gisele Halimi, Leila Sebbar, Andrée Chedid
unnumbered	Mapanje, Jack	1993		The Chattering Wagtails of Mikuyu Prison
unnumbered	Mahjoub, Jamal	1994		Wings of Dust
unnumbered	Hirson, Denis (ed), with Trump, Martin	1994	Short Stories	South African Short Stories, including contributions from Njabulo Ndebele, Dugmore Boetie, Ernst Havemann, Jack Cope, Elise Muller, Herman Charles Bosman, Breyten Breytenbach, Ivan Vladislavic, Hennie Aucamp, Etienne van Heerden, Bartho Smit, Can Themba, Bheki Maseko, Mango Tshabangu, Dan Jacobson, Nadine Gordimer, Ahmed Essop, Bessie Head, Christopher Hope, Alan Paton, Zoe Wicomb
unnumbered	Emecheta, Buchi	1994		In the Ditch. (Originally published London: 1972; revised edition Allison & Busby, 1979.)
unnumbered	Emecheta, Buchi	1994		Second Class Citizen. (Originally published London: Allison & Busby, 1974.)
unnumbered	Emecheta, Buchi	1994		Head above Water
unnumbered	Emecheta, Buchi	1994		Gwendolen
unnumbered	Emecheta, Buchi	1994		Kehinde
unnumbered	Emecheta, Buchi	1994		Destination Biafra
unnumbered	Chimombo, Steve	1994		Napolo and the Python
unnumbered	Sam, Agnes	1994	Short Stories	Jesus is Indian and other stories, including "High Heel", "Jesus is Indian", "Poppy", "A Bag of Sweets", "A Well-Loved Woman", "Nana and Devi", "Sunflowers", "Two Women", "Innocents", "The Seed", "Jellymouse", "Maths", "The Story Teller", "And They Christened It Indenture"
unnumbered	Couto, Mia	1994		Every Man is a Race
unnumbered	Tansi, Sony Lab'ou	1995		The Seven Solitudes of Lorsa Lopes
unnumbered	Beyala, Calixthe	1995		Loukoum, or the "Little Prince" of Belville
unnumbered	Darko, Amma	1995		Beyond the Horizon
unnumbered	Head, Bessie	1995	Short Stories	The Cardinals with Meditations and other stories, including "Earth and Everything", "Africa", "My Home", "A Personal View of the Survival of the Unfittest", "Where is the Hour of the Beautiful Dancing of the Birds in the Sun-Wind?", "Poor man", "Earth Love".
unnumbered	Chipasula, Stella, and Frank Chipasula (eds)	1995	Poetry	African Women's Poetry, includes contributions by Daniele Amrane, Leila Djibali, Ana Greki, Malika O'Lahsen, Queen Hatshepsut, Andrée Chedid, Malak'Abd al-Aziz, Joyce Mansour, Rachida Madani, Amina Said, Irène Assiba d'Almeida, Ama Ata Aidoo, Abena P. A. Busia, Rashidah Ismaili, Molara Ogunidpe Leslie, Maria Manuela Margrido, Alda do Espírito Santo, Annette Mbaye d'Erneville, Marina Gashe, Marjorie Oludhe Macgoye, Mwana Kupona binti Msham, Micere Githae Mugo, Stella M. Chipasula, Shakuntala Hawoldar, Assumpta Acam-Oturu, Alda Lara, Maria Eugenia Lima, Amélia Veiga, Gwendolen C. Konie, Noemia de Sousa, Jeni Couzyn, Ingrid de Kok, Amelia Blossom Pegram, Ingrid Jonker, Lindiwe Mabuza, Zindzi Mandela, Gcina Mhlophe, Phumzile Zulu, Kristina Rungano
unnumbered	Collen, Lindsey	1995		The Rape of Shavi. (Originally published New York: George Braziller, 1983.)
unnumbered	Emecheta, Buchi	1995		The Slave Girl. (Originally published London Allison & Busby, 1977.]
unnumbered	Emecheta, Buchi	1995		The Bride Price. (Originally published London: Allison & Busby, 1976.)
unnumbered	Jacobs, Steve	1995		The Enemy Within
unnumbered	Botha, W. P. B.	1995		Wantok
unnumbered	Sobott-Mogwe, Gaele	1995		Colour Me Blue, includes "Telling Stories", "Rendering up the Glebe", "Hello, Goodbye", "Jomo", "Five to One", "Motho Fela", "The Road Ahead", "Bahmumagading", "In Confinement", "Hide Them Under The Bed", "The Battle of Jericho", "Colour Me Blue", "Mare", "Smile of Fortune", "Another Little Peace of our Hearts", "Dread", "The Birds in her Garden", "Revenge is Sweet".
unnumbered	Beyala, Calixthe	1996		Your Name Shall Be Tanga
unnumbered	Beyala, Calixthe	1996		The Sun Hath Looked Upon Me
unnumbered	Accad, Evelyn	1996		Wounding Words: A Woman's Journal
unnumbered	Pepetela	1996		Yaka
unnumbered	Mahjoub, Jamal	1996		In the Hour of Signs
unnumbered	Jacobs, Rayda	1996		The Eyes of the Sky
unnumbered	Botha, W. P. B	1997		A Duty of Memory
unnumbered	Darko, Amma	1998		The Housemaid
unnumbered	Kanengoni, Alexander	1998		Echoing Siliences
unnumbered	King-Aribisala, Karen	1998		Kicking Tongues
unnumbered	Kwakye, Benjamin	1998		The Clothes of Nakedness
unnumbered	Vera, Yvonne	1999		Opening Spaces: Contemporary African Women's Writing, including contributions by Ama Ata Aidoo, Melissa Tandiwe Myambo, Lindsey Collen, Farida Karodia, Norma Kitson, Veronique Tadjo, Leila Aboulela, Ifeoma Okoye, Lilia Momple, Sindiwe Magona, Chiedza Musengezi, Monde Sifusniso, Gugu Ndlovu, Anna Dao, Milly Jafta
unnumbered	Oguine, Ike	2000		A Squatter's Tale
unnumbered	Ndibe, Okey	2000		Arrows of Rain
unnumbered	Emecheta, Buchi	2000		The New Tribe
unnumbered	Sinyangwe, Binwell	2000		A Cowrie of Hope
unnumbered	Chinodya, Shimmer	2001		Dew in the Morning
unnumbered	Aboulela, Leila	2001		The Translator
unnumbered	Andreas, Neshani	2001		The Purple Violet of Oshaantu
unnumbered	Momplé, Lilia	2001		Neighbours: the story of a murder
unnumbered	Chinodya, Shimmer	2001	Short Stories	Can We Talk and Other Stories, including "Hoffman Street", "The Man Who Hanged Himself", "Going to See Mr B.V.", "Among the Dead", "Brothers and Sisters", "Snow", "The Waterfall", "Play Your Cards", "Strays", "Bramson", "Can We Talk".
unnumbered	Tadjo, Veronique	2001		As the Crow Flies
unnumbered	Tadjo, Veronique	2002	Nonfiction	The Shadow of Imana: Travels in the Heart of Rwanda
unnumbered	Aidoo, Ama Ata	2002	Short Stories	The Girl Who Can and Other Stories, including "Her Hair Politics – a very short story", "Choosing – a moral of the world of work", "The Girls WHO Can", "Comparisons or Who Said a Bird Cannot Aather a Crab?", "Nutty", "She-Who-Would-Be-King (with apology to Rudyard Kipling", "Heavy Moments", "Some Global News - A short-four-voice report", "About the Wedding Feast", "Lice", "Payments", "Male-ing Names in the Sun", "Newly-Opened Doors", "Nowhere Cool".
unnumbered	Mapanje, Jack (ed)	2002		Gathering Seaweed: African Prison Writing, including contributions from Kenneth D. Kaunda, Agostinho Neto, Oginga Odinga, Kwame Nkrumah, Jomo Kenyatta, Eddison J. Zvibogo, Felix Mnthali, Steve Biko, Jeremy Cronin, Moncef Marzouki, Ken Saro-Wiwa, Joseph Mwangi Kariuki, Sam Mpasu, Yves Emmanuel Dogbe, Kwame Safo-Adu, Albie Sachs, Dennis Brutus, Jose Craveirinha, Ahmed Fouad Negm, Wole Soyinka, Kofi Awoonor, Ingopapele Madingoane, Fatima Meer, Edison Mpina, Ogaga Ifowodo, Leila Djabali, Obafemi Owolowo, Molefe Pheto, Tshenuwani Simon Farisani, Abdellatif Laabi, Syl Cheney-Coker, Koigi wa Wamwere, Maina wa Kinyatti, Jack Mapanje, Muhammad Afifi Matar, Tahar Djaout, Nelson Mandela, António Jacinto, Winnie Madikizela-Mandela, Breyten Breytenbach, Ngugi wa Thiong'o, Caesarina Kona Makhoere, Kunle Ajibade, Tandundu E. A. Bisikisi, Pitika Ntuli, Jaki Seroke, Fela Anikulapo-Kuti, Christine Anyanwu, Mzwakhe Mbuli
unnumbered	Pepetela	2002		Return of the Water Spirit
unnumbered	Aidoo, Ama Ata	2003		Changes: A Love Story
unnumbered	Mengara, Daniel	2003		Mema

== Digitisation and relaunch ==
In 2005 Chadwyck-Healey Literature Collection began to digitise the series, which was completed in 2009.

It was then relaunched by Pearson Education in 2011, which began reissuing titles from the original list as 'Classics' and a number of new works.

New titles included:

- The Purple Violet of Oshaantu by Neshani Andreas (2011)
- Woman of the Aeroplanes by B. Kojo Laing (2011)
- Search Sweet Country by B. Kojo Laing (2011)
- The Lovers by Bessie Head (2011)
- How Shall We Kill the Bishop and other stories by Lily Mabura (2012)
- The Grub Hunter by Amir Tag Elsir (2012)
- Sterile Sky by E. E. Sule (2012)
- Mindblast by Dambudzo Marechera (2015)

In 2018 Pearson signed a digital license agreement for the series with Digitalback Book.

The relaunched African Writers Series logo, designed by Stephen Embleton Nov 2021

In December 2021, Abibiman Publishing and the James Currey Society in Oxford announced that the series would be relaunched again. The new series will be edited by the James Currey Fellow at Oxford University, Stephen Embleton. Embleton stated: "Our mandate is clear and threefold: build on the legacy of the original African Writers Series, actively seek works written in African languages, and have the writers of this Continent at the helm."

African Writers Series, logo 2021

== See also ==
- Heinemann Caribbean Writers Series
- List of African writers
- Three Crowns Books
- Writing in Asia Series
