= Yulisa Pat Amadu Maddy =

Sierra Leonean actor, director and playwright (1936–2014)

Yulisa Amadu Pat Maddy
- Born: 27 December 1936; Freetown, Sierra Leone
- Died: 16 March 2014 (aged 77); Freetown, Sierra Leone
- Other name: Pat Maddy
- Education: St. Edward's Secondary School; Rose Bruford College of Speech and Drama
- Occupations: Writer, poet, actor, dancer, director and playwright
- Notable work: No Past, No Present, No Future (1973)

Yulisa Amadu Pat Maddy (27 December 1936 – 16 March 2014) was a Sierra Leonean writer, poet, actor, dancer, director and playwright. Known by his friends and colleagues as Pat Maddy or simply Prof, he had an "immense impact" on theatre in Sierra Leone, Nigeria and Zambia.

== Biography ==
Maddy was born to Creole parents in Freetown, Sierra Leone, where he grew up and was educated (attending St. Edward's Secondary School) until the age of 22. In 1958, he travelled to France and then Britain. Maddy trained at the Rose Bruford College of Speech and Drama in the UK, and started broadcasting in Britain and Denmark, writing and producing radio plays.

He was Director of Drama at the Keskidee Centre in London, and led the short-lived Pan African Players, which in 1966 represented the United Kingdom, together with the Negro Theatre Workshop, at the first World Festival of Negro Arts in Dakar, Senegal, performing Obi Egbuna's Wind versus Polygamy. Maddy's early plays, initially produced on the BBC African Service, were published as Obasai and Other Plays (1968). In the mid-1960s, he lived in Denmark, where a book of his poetry, Ny afrikansk prosa, was published (1969).

On his return to Sierra Leone in 1968, Maddy became Head of Drama on Radio Sierra Leone. He was a founder-director of the theatre company Gbakanda Afrikan Tiata, established 1969 in Freetown. He subsequently worked in Zambia, where he directed the national dance troupe and trained them for the Montreal World's Fair in 1970. He also taught drama in Nigeria, at the University of Ibadan and the University of Ilorin, and in the United States.

In 1972, Maddy directed the first major production to be staged at the Keskidee Centre in London: Lindsay Barrett's theatrical collage of drama, dance and music, Sighs of a Slave Dream, performed by a Nigerian troupe.

Maddy's first novel, No Past, No Present, No Future, explored the dynamics of a group of three friends (including, controversially, at the time, one gay man) growing up in colonial West Africa and their physical, psychological and emotional journeys to Europe. It was published in 1973, to great acclaim in the Heinemann African Writers Series, and his writing continued to develop. His work, which is often challenging and confrontational, has been broadcast by the BBC and published internationally. However, the uncompromising tone of his writing, and particularly in his views on the social and political inequalities in Africa, led to his political imprisonment in Sierra Leone. Upon his release, he was forced to leave the country and become a political exile.

In 2007, Maddy returned to Sierra Leone to teach at Freetown's Milton Margai College of Education and continue his academic research of exploring and developing Sierra Leone's cultural heritage, providing inspiration and opportunities to a new generation of artists and performers, and continuing to give a "voice to the voiceless" through the work of his Gbakanda Foundation. After a long period of illness, he died in March 2014, aged 78, at Choitram Hospital, Freetown.

== Awards and honours ==
Maddy received a Sierra Leone National Arts Festival Award in 1973, a Gulbenkian Grant from the Calouste Gulbenkian Foundation in 1978, and in 1979 an Edinburgh Festival Award.

He has also received the distinction of being commemorated in a special stained-glass window of the Pride Library in Canada, as one of 135 writers, including William Shakespeare, Federico García Lorca, W. H. Auden, James Baldwin and others, who have been acknowledged for their outstanding contribution to literature.

== Works ==
- Alla Gbah [The Big Man], 1967
- Yon Kon [Clever Thief], 1968. Reprinted in Cosmo Pieterse (ed.), Ten One-Act Plays, Heinemann, 1968. African Writers Series 34.
- Obasai [Over Yonder], 1971. Reprinted in Obasai and Other Plays, Heinemann, 1968. African Writers Series 89.
- Ghana Bendu [Tough Guy], 1971
- Life Everlasting, 1972. Reprinted in Cosmo Pieterse (ed.), Short African Plays, Heinemann, 1972. African Writers Series 78.
- No Past, No Present, No Future (novel), London: Heinemann Educational, 1973. African Writers Series 137.
- If Wishes Were Horses (radio play), 1973
- Big Breeze Blow, produced Freetown, 1974
- Take Tem Draw Di Rope, Freetown, 1975
- Naw We Yone Dehn See, 1975
- Put for Me, produced Freetown, 1975
- Big Berrin (Big Burying), Freetown, 1976
- Saturday Night Out (television play), 1980
- A Journey Into Christmas, 1980
- Drums, Voices and Words, 1985
- (with Donnarae MacCann) African Images in Juvenile Literature: Commentaries on Neocolonialist Fiction, Jefferson, N.C.: McFarland, 1996
- (with Donnarae MacCann) Neo-imperialism in Children's Literature about Africa: A Study of Contemporary Fiction, New York: Routledge, 2009.
