= Aniebo =

Aniebo is a surname. Notable people with the surname include:

- Augustine Aniebo (born 1950), Nigerian administrator
- I. N. C. Aniebo (born 1939), Nigerian novelist
