= The Poor Christ of Bomba =

1956 novel by Mongo Beti

- Author: Mongo Beti
- Original title: Le Pauvre Christ de Bomba
- Translator: Gerald Moore
- Subject: Catholic missions
- Genre: Literary fiction
- Publisher: Waveland Press
- Publication date: 1956
- Publication place: Cameroon
- English publication date: 1971
- Media type: Print (hardcover)
- Pages: 222
- ISBN: 978-1-57766-418-5 (1971 edition)
- OCLC: 1002813662
- Followed by: Mission to Kala

The Poor Christ of Bomba is a satirical novel by Mongo Beti. It was published in 1956 as Le Pauvre Christ de Bomba.

== Plot ==
Set in the 1930s, the story is narrated by Dennis who is Father Drumont's house-boy. The story revolves around Father Drumont who established a parish in Bomba, a small village in southern Cameroon. It tells about how he strives to convert the natives to Christianity and encourage monogamy.

== Characters ==
- Father Drumont, a Catholic missionary.
- Father Jean-Martin LeGuen, Father Drumont's assistant.
- Raphael, a catechist and Father Drumont assistant in charge of the parish.
- Denis, the narrator and Drumont's house-boy.
- Zacharia, the parish cook.
- Vidal, a French colonial administrator of the region.
- Catherine, Dennis' lover.
- Clementine, Zacharia's wide.
- Daniel, One of Denis' companions apart from Zacharia.
