= Miles Lee =

Miles Allday Lee, later Miles Ahmed Lee, FRSA (died June 1986) was a British puppeteer and radio producer. While working for Radio Uganda, he played an important role in the encouragement of East African literature. Paul Theroux recalled him in memorable terms:

I knew the producer, Miles Lee, an authentic Gypsy whose training for Radio Uganda consisted of working for many years as a fortuneteller at the Goose Fair in Nottingham. He too had become a Muslim, changing his middle name, Allday, to Ahmed... He was another one who said, 'Of course Muslims can drink. But not during prayers.'

== Life ==
Before World War II Lee was Stage Director at the Birmingham Repertory Company. After serving in the RAF during the war, he became an Advisor to the Scottish Community Drama Association. In 1951 he founded the Belgrave Mews Puppet Theatre in Edinburgh. He was a freelance producer for the BBC and commercial television, before moving to Uganda to work for Radio Uganda. In autumn 1964 Lee persuaded David Cook, a literature lecturer at Makarere University, to chair a monthly radio programme about East African writing. Lee and Cook collaborated on an anthology of East African plays in 1968, and some of the broadcasts they made together were later collected and published.

== Works ==
- Puppet Theatre Production and Manipulation, 1958. Introduction by Cyril Beaumont.
- (ed. with David Cook) Short East African Plays in English: ten plays in English. London & Nairobi: Heinemann Educational, 1968. African Writers Series, No. 28.
- 'Theatre for Development', Africa Media Review, Vol. 1, Issue 1 (1986), p. 69
- Techniques of Radio Production, 1986
