= Mission to Kala =

Novel by Mongo Beti (1957/8)

- Author: Mongo Beti
- Original title: Mission terminée
- Translator: Peter Green
- Language: English
- Series: African Writers Series
- Genre: Fiction
- Publisher: Heinemann
- Publication date: 1957
- Publication place: Cameroon
- English publication date: 1958
- Media type: Print (Paperback)
- Pages: 182
- ISBN: 9780435900137
- OCLC: 2217975

Mission to Kala is a novel written by the Cameroonian author Mongo Beti. It was first published as Mission terminée in French in 1957 and then translated by Peter Green in 1958 as part of the African Writers Series which was published by Heinemann.

== Plot ==
Mission to Kala follows Jean-Marie Medza the protagonist who was recruited in the army after failing his baccalauréat exam. He is sent to a village to retrieve the run-away wife and bring her back. He discovers a new adventure while on his duty to retrieve the woman.

== Theme ==
The theme includes coming-of-age, alienation and adventure.
