= George Hallett (photographer) =

South African photographer (1942–2020)

George Hallett (30 December 1942 – 1 July 2020) was a South African photographer well known for his portraits of South African exiles, while he too, lived in exile. Many of Hallet's varied projects, capture nuances of the country's turbulent history through Apartheid and into the young democracy.

== Childhood and influences ==
Born in District Six, Cape Town, Hallett was raised in the fishing village of Hout Bay by his grandparents. He spent a lot of his time in his grandfather's workshop, where he was taught how to make his own toys, wagons and kites. He became interested in photography while rifling through his uncle's copies of National Geographic magazine and the black-and-white moving images of the cinema. He attended South Peninsula High School in Diep River where his English teacher, Richard Rive introduced him to the work of local and international artists and writers. Rive later became a journalist for Drum magazine but at the time he met George, he was an inspired dramatist, writer and activist. He encouraged his students not only to read from the syllabus but introduced them to writers such as James Matthews, Alex La Guma, Jan Rabie, Uys Krige, Breyten Breytenbach and others from The Sestigers movement. Another important influence was artist Peter Clarke, an Ocean View resident. Clarke focused his creativity in the field of printmaking and painting, on his community. He was involved in various community based projects and workshops.

== Life and work ==
Hallett, without any experience in the field, chose the route of photography. He was self-taught and began his career as a street photographer. He furthered his skill by taking a correspondence course in photography with the City and Guilds in London at the age of 20. In his early work, he photographed District Six extensively, before its destruction under apartheid in the 1970s. James Matthews was instrumental in rallying Hallett to photograph District Six before it was razed. He also did freelance photography for Drum magazine, but there were not many job opportunities in South Africa. Having suffered stabbings on the Cape Flats and fed up with racism and violence in South Africa, he moved to London in 1970. He started working for The Times Educational Supplement in London and designed book covers for Heinemann Educational Books for more than 12 years. His first exhibition with South African artists Gerard Sekoto and Louis Maurice was held in Paris in 1971. This was followed by an exhibition of his South African work in the Westerkerk in Amsterdam that same year. In 1974 he moved to the South of France. He lived in a small farming community in the Pyrenees Mountains. The work from this period earned him an award from Hasselblad for outstanding contributions to photography (1982).

Through his travels he continued to connect with exiled South Africans, many of whom were also poets, musicians, artists and writers, he soon became a part of this closely knit family. He made contact with the likes of Pallo Jordan, Alex La Guma, and Dudu Pukwana in London, and African writers such as Wole Soyinka and Ahmadou Kourouma in Berlin. Many of these images were later compiled in his book Portraits of African Writers. In 1983 he was offered an opportunity to be an Artist in Residence at the University of Illinois. He took this opportunity with both hands, spending the rest of the decade in the United States where he was invited to participate in exhibitions and projects with five other universities. He later moved to Amsterdam. He had not been there long when the ANC requested he return to South Africa to record the first Democratic Elections.

The many images that resulted earned him a Golden Eye Award from World Press Photo in Amsterdam. He was the official photographer for the Truth and Reconciliation Commission in 1997. Many poignant works were produced in this period. One such is the image entitled Jann Turner with Eugene de Kock, TRC Headquarters 1997. Eugene De Kock was the commander at Vlakplaas, where political activist Rick Turner, father of Jann Turner, was assassinated in front of her by security policemen. The weight of this image is in the exchange between the two subjects, with Turner's dry smile and De Kock's straight gaze ahead. This project led to his work with the Nobel Peace Centre in Oslo and the resulting travelling exhibition, Strengths and Convictions: The life and times of the South African Nobel Peace laureates Albert Luthuli, Desmond Tutu, FW de Klerk and Nelson Mandela.

Yet, Hallett's work is focused on capturing positive moments that communicate the triumph of the human spirit. He was vocal about this quality in his work. It sets his work apart from his peers and its development can be traced back to his early images of District Six and continued into his understated portraits of South African exiles. Hallett identified with the exiled, but not only politically. Images would include family and community activity as they interacted with each other, socialising, making music and the like. His partiality to the hopeful does not compromise the often sombre or dire themes he tackles through his image production. Hallett described himself as a humanist. He was strongly committed to passing on his skills to aspiring photographers, and has taught photography at American, British, European, and South African institutions. Hallett's photographs are represented in museums and galleries in South Africa as well as internationally.

Hallett died peacefully in his sleep after a long illness on 1 July 2020.

== Gallery ==
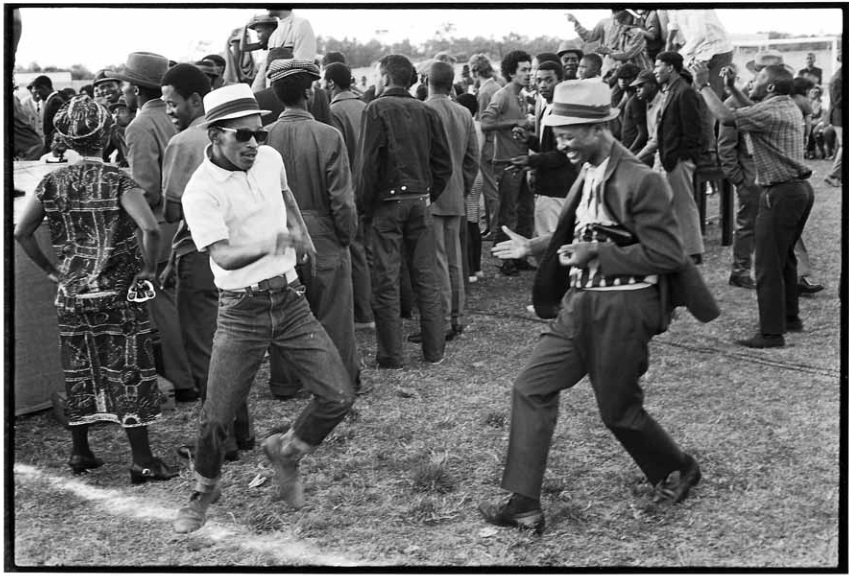

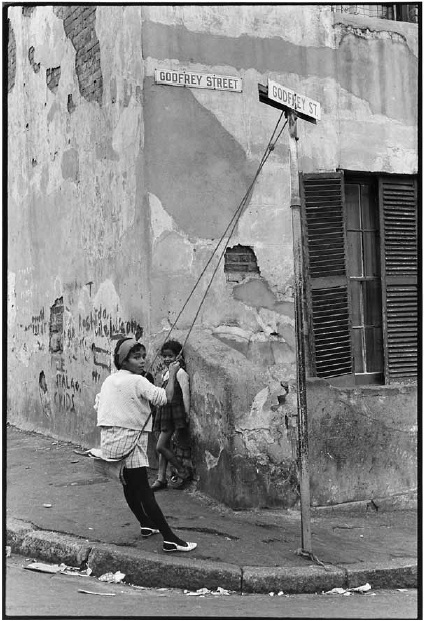

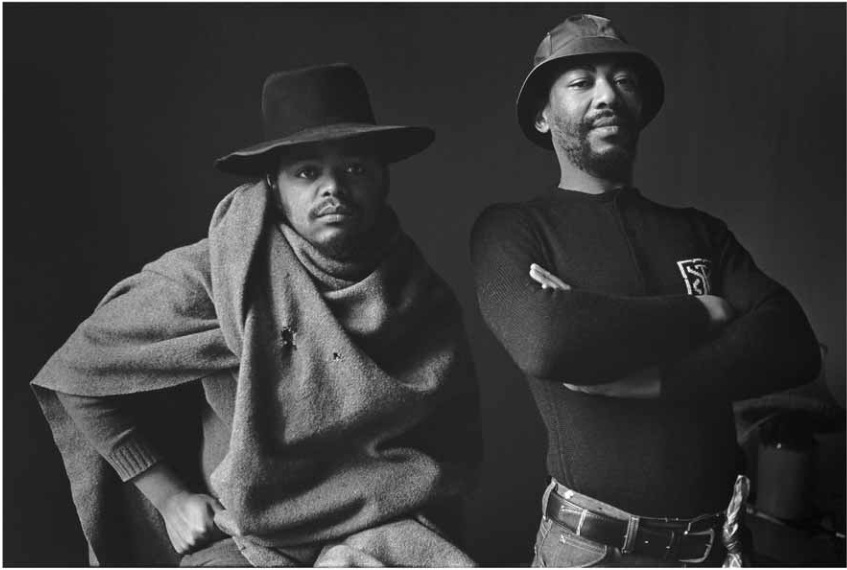

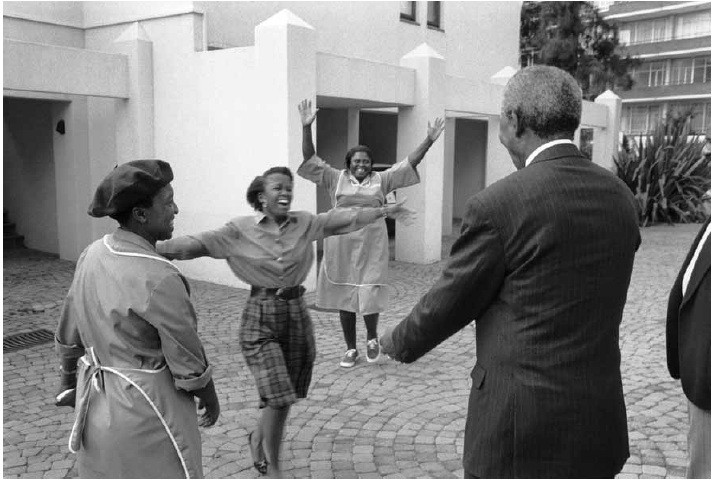

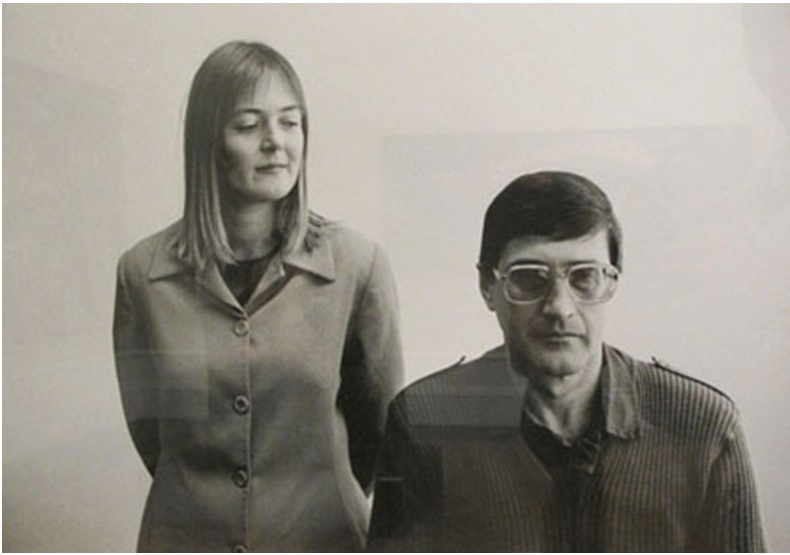

== Solo exhibitions ==
- 1970: The Artists' Gallery | Cape Town.
- 1971: Westerkerk | Amsterdam, Netherlands.
- 1972: Anne Frank Huis, Amsterdam. (With Louis Maurice & Gerard Sekoto), Présence Africaine, Salle de La Siem, Paris. University of Brussels.
- 1973: Susan Loppert Graphics, London. Central London Polytechnic. John Hansard Gallery, Southampton University | England.
- 1975: Midi Libre journal | Perpignan, France.
- 1979: Portraits of African Writers | Frankfurter Buchmesse, Germany. Künstlerhaus Bethanien, Berlin.
- 1980: Atelier Six | Ceret, France.
- 1982: Women of Southern Africa | Conference Centre, Harare, Zimbabwe. McKinley Foundation, University of Illinois | United States.
- 1983: Howard University | Washington DC; Michigan State University, Lansing; Emory University, Georgia; Tuskegee Institute, Georgia; Southern Illinois University, Carbondale; United States.
- 1985: University of Illinois at Urbana–Champaign | United States.
- 1988: Künstforum der Sozialdemokratie | Bonn, Germany.
- 1989: Afrika Centrum, Cadier en Keer | Maastricht, Netherlands.
- 1995: Transformation, 1994 Elections | Irma Stern Museum | Cape Town.
- 1999: The Face of Bo-Kaap | Bo-Kaap Museum, Cape Town. Metropolitan Life, Metropolitan Life Headquarters, Bellville | Cape Town.
- 1999: Metropolitan Life headquarters | Cape Town.
- 2000: Dance for All | Maidenhead Cultural Centre | UK.
- 2001: Dance for All | The Aschegach Gallery | Amsterdam, Netherlands.
- 2002: Red Cross Children's Hospital | Cavendish Square, Cape Town.
- 2004: The Truth and Reconciliation Commission Exhibition | Herbert Art Gallery and Museum | Coventry, UK.
- 2005: South African Exiles of the '70s and '80s in Europe | Spitz Gallery | London.
- 2006: Portraits of African Writers | Cape Town International Book Fair | Cape Town.
- 2007: Portraits of African Writers | Rhodes University, Grahamstown | South Africa.
- 2009: A Photographic Journey | Helderberg Photographic Society | Western Cape, South Africa
- 2010: 1994 Elections and Mandela's Vision | Parliament of Bremen; and touring, Germany | Impressions of Italy, Artscape, Cape Town. Portraits from Exile, Bonhams, London.
- 2018: George Hallett: Portraits of Nelson Mandela | Dégagements Henry Le Bœuf | Brussel

== Publications ==
=== Publications by Hallett ===
- 1973: Cosmo Pieterse, Present Lives Future Becoming, London: Hickey Press.
- 1979: Images, Athlone, Cape Town: BLAC Publishing House.
- 1995: Rashid Lombard (ed.), Images of Change, Nolwazi Educational Publishers (photos by Hallett).
- 2000: Rhizomes of Memory-Tre Sydafrikanske Føtografer, with David Goldblatt and Santu Mofokeng, Oslo: Forlaget Press.
- 2004: Moving in Time, KMM Publishers (as project director and editor).
- 2006: Women by Women, Wits University Press (project director and editor with Neo Ntsoma and Robin Cromley). Y2Y Youth to Youth, 30 Years after Soweto, Wits University Press (project director and editor).
- 2006: Portraits of African Writers, Johannesburg; Wits University Press. ISBN 978-1868143863
- 2007: District Six Revisited, Wits University Press (editor and contributing photographer, along with Clarence Coulson, Wilfred Paulse, Jackie Heynes, and graphics by Gavin Jantjes). ISBN 978-1868144525
- 2007–08: Sawubona [in-flight magazine for SAA] (as photographic consultant).
- 2008: Mike Mzileni, All that Jazz (as photo editor, with Steven Macbeth)
- 2010: Rashid Lombard, Jazz Rocks (as editor and designer). ISBN 978-0620464611

=== Publications with contributions by Hallett ===
- 1968: [Photographic essay, jazz images], Contrast, vol. 5.
- 1970: [Photographic essay, District Six] Contrast, Cape and Transvaal Printers.
- 1970s: Staffrider, Johannesburg.
- 1970s–'80s: Heinemann's African Writers Series book covers.
- 1973: Cosmo Pieterse, Present Lives Future Becoming, Hickey Press. include names of photographs.
- 1988: [Calendar], Holland Committee on South Africa.
- 1990: [Photographic Essay on South African Exile Artists], Leadership, vol. 9.
- 1991: South African Short Stories, Reader's Digest. "South Africa's New World", Leadership.
- 1995: World Press Photo, Thames & Hudson.
- 1996: [Calendar], Spoornet.
- 1998: Antjie Krog, Country of My Skull, Random House (book cover).
- 2000: Hein Willemse (ed.), More than Brothers: Peter Clarke & James Matthews at 70, Kwela Books. [Photo essay on Livingstone High School], Leadership, Hugh Murray.
- 2001: Zenzile Khoisan, Jacaranda Time, Garib Communications. George Makana Clark, "The Raw Man", Transition, Duke University Press. Keith Adams (ed.), We Came for Mandela: The Cultural Life of the Refugee Community in Cape Town, Footprints Publishers.
- 2003: Paul Faber, Group Portrait South Africa, Kwela Books & KIT Publishers.
- 2005: "Jazz Exiles Re-Initiation Concert", Classic Feel.
- 2006: Prince Mbusi Dube (ed.), Dumile Feni Retrospective, Wits University Press.
- 2007: Paul Weinberg (ed.), Then and Now, Eight South African Photographers, The Highveld Press. Ryland Fisher Race, Jacana Publishers.
- 2008: Christine Eyene, "The Human Face of History", Art South Africa, vol. 6, no 3. James Currey, Africa Writes Back, Wits University Press.
- 2009: Gavin Jantjes (ed.), Strengths and Convictions.

== Commissions ==
- Numerous commissions including: Nobel Foundation, Norway. Terres des Hommes, Switzerland. Cameroon Airlines; Sentinelle Press; Paris. Künstlerhaus Bethanien; Documenta 12; Germany.
- The Department of Arts & Culture; Parliament of South Africa; The Truth and Reconciliation Commission; African National Congress; Oasis Asset Management; Metropolitan Life Insurance; PetroSA; Spoornet; Random House; Jacana Publishers; Leadership; ESP Africa; OLSET Education Trust; Artscape Theatre; Red Cross Children's Hospital; Bush Radio; Sathima Bea Benjamin; District Six Museum; South Africa.

== Work in public collections ==
Anne Frank Foundation; Amsterdam. Documenta; Germany. Sonja Henie-Nils Onstad Collection; Oslo, Norway. Birmingham Central Library; UK. Schomburg Centre for Research in Black Culture; New York Public Library; United States. Iziko South African National Gallery, Cape Town; Bo-Kaap Museum, Cape Town; District Six Museum, Cape Town; Rhodes University, Grahamstown; Mayibuye Centre, University of the Western Cape; Sached Educational Trust, Mowbray; Red Cross Children’s Hospital, Cape Town; Metropolitan Life Insurance; Bensusan Museum of Photography, the Market Theatre Complex, Johannesburg; The Open Learning Systems Education Trust, Johannesburg; South Africa.

== Films ==
- 1974: District Six – documentary for ITV; provided stills and consultant on production with writer Alex La Guma, London
- 1998: Morokaners uit Amsterdam – 20-minute information video directed by Hallett for the Ministerie van Volks Welzijn en Kultuur.

== Awards ==
- 1980: Hasselblad Camera, Sweden. Award for Outstanding Contributions to Photography.
- 1995: World Press Photo. 3rd Prize Golden Eye Award.
- 1996: Jury of World Press Photo, Amsterdam.
- 1999: Cape Times, One City Many Cultures. Winner, Photo-Journalistic excellence: Picture story category.

== Teaching ==
- 1972–73: Central London Polytechnic.
- 1981–82: ZIMCO, Harare.
- 1982: University of Illinois, Michigan State University, Emory University, Tuskegee Institute, Howard University, USA.
- 1985: Centre for Foreigners, Amsterdam.
- 1987: St Martin’s School of Art, London.
- 1993: School of Photography, Cape Town.
- University of Cape Town. Iziko Bo-Kaap Museum, Cape Town.
- 1998–99: Workshops, Institute for the Advancement of Journalism, Johannesburg. School for International Training,
- 2000: Private lessons and mentorship programmes, Cape Town.
- 2001: Oslo Foto Kunst Skole, Norway (lectured for two weeks).
- 2002–07: Cape Peninsula University of Technology (as moderator and teacher).
- 2008: Voicings programme theme democracy, St Cloud State University, Minnesota.

== See also ==
- Alex La Guma
- James Matthews (writer)
- Peter Clarke (artist)
- Richard Rive
- Sestigers

== Literature ==
- Hallett, George. 2006. Portraits of African Writers, Wits University Press, Johannesburg
- Weinberg, Paul (ed.). 2007. Then and Now, Eight South African Photographers, The Highveld Press. Ryland Fisher Race, Jacana Publishers
- Jantjes, Gavin (ed.). 2009. Strengths and Convictions: the life and times of the South African Nobel Peace Laureates. Nobel Peace Center [978-82-7547-376-7]
