= Neshani Andreas =

Namibian writer

- Born: 1964; Walvis Bay, South-West Africa
- Died: May 2011 (aged 46–47); Windhoek, Namibia
- Education: University of Namibia
- Occupations: Writer, teacher
- Writing career
- Notable work: The Purple Violet of Oshaantu

Neshani Andreas (1964 – May 2011) was a Namibian writer, who had also worked as a teacher and for the American Peace Corps. She is best known for her novel The Purple Violet of Oshaantu, which made her the first Namibian to be included in Heinemann's African Writers Series. She died at the age of 46, having been diagnosed with lung cancer in early 2010.

== Early life ==
She was born in Walvis Bay, South-West Africa (now Namibia), in 1964, the second of eight children, and first worked at a clothing factory. Her parents were both employees of a fish factory. Andreas wanted to be a writer from a young age. She studied at the teachers' college in Ongwediva and taught there for five years. Andreas went on to earn a Bachelor of Arts and a post-graduate diploma in education at the University of Namibia. She was an associate director of the American Peace Corps in Namibia for four years. It was there that she met the first person to encourage her writing, which she later described as "one of the most treasured moments in my life".

== Teaching and writing career ==
From 1988 to 1992, Andreas taught at a rural school in northern Namibia. In 2001, she published The Purple Violet of Oshaantu which was inspired in part by her experiences there. The novel explores the status of women in traditional Namibian society. When the book was published as part of the African Writers Series by publishers Heinemann; the first Namibian author to have a work included.

The work gained her international attention, being one of the first post-independence novels published following the South African occupation. She explained that at the time, the writing culture was not well established in Namibia, describing the work as "lonely". At the time of publishing her first novel, she was 37 years old.

Andreas was working as a programme officer for the Forum for African Women Educationalists at the time of her death at the age of 46. The organisation seeks to educate women and girls. She had been diagnosed with lung cancer in early 2010.
