= Taban Lo Liyong =

South Sudanese poet, fiction writer and critic (born 1939)

- Born: 1939 (age 86–87); Kajo Kaji, Acholiland, Sudan, now in South Sudan
- Occupations: Poet, fiction writer, literary critic, academic

Taban Lo Liyong (born 1939) is a poet, academic and writer of fiction and literary criticism from South Sudan. He was born in Kajo Kaji, Acholiland, in the Equatoria region of southern Sudan but taken to Uganda at an early age. His political views, as well as his outspoken disapproval of the post-colonial system of education in East Africa, have inspired both further criticism as well as controversy since the late 1960s.

== Biography ==
He was born in Acholiland, then a region of southern Sudan under British rule. He received his early education at Gulu High school and the Sir Samuel Baker School. After graduation from secondary school in Uganda, he attended the National Teachers College in Kampala, Uganda's capital, before continuing his undergraduate studies at Knoxville College in Tennessee, and postgraduate studies at Howard University. At the University of Iowa Writer's Workshop, he was the first African graduate in 1968. On the completion of his studies in the US, the tyrannical regime of Idi Amin prevented him from returning to Uganda. Instead, he went to neighbouring Kenya and taught at the University of Nairobi. Furthermore, he has also taught at universities in Sudan, South Sudan, Papua New Guinea, Australia, Japan, and South Africa. In collaboration with Henry Owuor-Anyumba and Kenyan writer Ngugi wa Thiong'o, he wrote On the Abolition of the English Department in 1972.

Based on this article, which inspired postcolonial students of English in Africa to question the practices of their discipline, Liyong, Owuor-Anyumba and wa Thiong'o were criticized for advocating cultural or even racial purity within academia. Their stated goal was to re-establish traditional East African ways of knowledge and understanding in literature, in an effort towards authenticity and as a means for the region to better understand itself in the context of national independence. By placing African culture at the centre of education, "all other things [would] be considered in their relevance to [the African] situation, and their contribution towards understanding [itself]". This philosophy was also politically significant at a time when East African governing bodies were struggling against the influence of post-colonial powers, such as the US and Great Britain. At the same time Liyong has described eastern Africa as a "literary wasteland".

In February 2020, Lo Liyong was suspended from his teaching assignment by the University of Juba, because he had written critical comments on South Sudan's government in a local South Sudanese newspaper. In a letter to Professor John A. Akec, Vice Chancellor of the University of Juba, 28 US-based academics, including a number of South Sudanese alumni of the University of Juba, expressed their opposition to the suspension.

According to the Encyclopædia Britannica, "Liyong wrote highly imaginative short narratives, such as Fixions (1969), and unorthodox free verse (...), his nonfiction output consists of argumentative and amusing personal essays and bold literary criticism (...), presenting challenging new ideas in an original manner."

Liyong has published over twenty books, including Carrying Knowledge Up a Palm Tree (1998), an anthology of poetry that addresses various contemporary issues and follows African progress in recent history. The East African Literature Bureau (EALB) published many of Liyong's earlier works in English, as well as in translation into East African languages.

In his introduction to Literary Sudans: An Anthology of Literature from Sudan and South Sudan, he wrote:

In this collection most writers are rebels against the system or fighting a kind of existential war. [...] Third World artists during the decades of African independence from 1950 to 1970 were to assist the politicians in pushing for Cultural Revolution and independence, but after seeing how the politicians play loose with the blank check we gave them, it is high time the artists echoed the aspirations to democracy, respect for human rights and true nationalistic independence with emphasis on economic independence and welfare for us all.

— Taban Lo Lyiong

== Bibliography ==
=== Poetry collections ===
- Frantz Fanon's Uneven Ribs (1971)
- Another Nigger Dead (1972)
- Ballads of Underdevelopment (1976)
- The Cows of Shambat (1992)
- Words that Melt a Mountain (1996)
- Carrying Knowledge Up a Palm Tree (1997)
- Corpse Lovers and Corpse Haters (2005)
- After Troy (2021)

=== Short story collections ===
- Fixions (1969)

=== Non-fiction ===
- Meditations in Limbo (1970)
- The Uniformed Man: Essays (1971)
- Thirteen Offensives Against Our Enemies (1973)
- The Universal Variety of Negritude (1976)
- Meditations of Taban lo Liyong (1978)
- Christmas in Lodwar (1979; first published in 2009)
- Another Last Word (1990)
- Culture is Rutan (1991)
- Homage to Onyame (1997)

=== Plays ===
- Showhat and Sowhat (2007)

=== Literary criticism ===
- The Last Word: Cultural Synthesism (1969)
