= David Cook (literary critic) =

British academic, literary critic and anthologist

- Died: 30 March 2003
- Education: Birkbeck College
- Occupation: Academic
- Employer(s): University of Southampton; Makerere University; University of Ilorin
- Known for: Literary criticism; African literature

David Cook (1929 – 30 March 2003) was a British academic, literary critic and anthologist. As a professor of literature at the Universities of Makerere and Ilorin, he played an important role in encouraging literature in East Africa.

== Life ==
David Cook was educated at Birkbeck College, London, graduating from the University of London in 1954 with a first-class degree in English literature, and completing a MA in 1956. He then taught at the University of Southampton until 1962, when he became a lecturer at Makerere University. He became Senior Lecturer in 1965, and Professor and Head of department in 1967. From 1977 to 1989 he was Professor of English and Head of the Department of Modern European Languages at the University of Ilorin.

== Works ==
- (ed.) Origin East Africa: a Makerere anthology, London : Heinemann Educational Books, 1965. African Writers Series, 15.
- (ed. with Miles Lee) Short East African plays in English: ten plays in English, London & Nairobi: Heinemann Educational, 1968.
- (ed. with David Rubadiri) Poems from East Africa, London: Heinemann Educational, 1971. African Writers Series 96.
- (ed.) In black and white : writings from East Africa with broadcast discussions and commentary, Kampala: East African Literature Bureau, 1976
- African Literature: a critical view, London: Longman, 1977
- (with Michael Okenimpke) Ngugi wa Thiong'o, an exploration of his writings, London: Heinemann, 1983
- (ed. with Olu Obafemi and Wumi Raji) Rising Voices: an anthology of new Nigerian poetry, Yaba, Lagos : Kraft Books, 1991
