= Sahle Sellassie Berhane Mariam =

Ethiopian author and translator (born 1936)

- ሣህለ ሥላሴ ብርሃነ ማርያም
- Born: Sahle Ananka (ሳህለ ኣናንቃ); 1936 (age 89–90); Gurage Zone, Ethiopia
- Education: University College Addis Ababa; University of California, Los Angeles
- Occupation: Writer
- Writing career
- Genres: Novel; Short Story; Autobiography

Sahle Sellassie Berhane Mariam (Amharic: ሣህለ ሥላሴ ብርሃነ ማርያም; born 1936) is an Ethiopian novelist and translator.

Sahle Sellassie wrote the first novel in the Chaha Gurage language in the mid-1960s. In 1969, Heinemann published his first English-language novel in their African Writers Series. He continued to write novels into the 1980s. Sahle Sellassie also translated books into Amharic, including novels by Charles Dickens, Victor Hugo and others.

== Life and notable works ==
=== Early years and education ===
Sahle Sellassie Berhane Mariam was born Sahle Ananka (ሳህለ ኣናንቃ). He is a Gurage and was born in the village described in his first novel, Shinega's Village. Sahle Sellassie attended a Catholic mission school in Endibir before moving to Addis Ababa to complete his secondary education. After moving he changed his name.

Sahle Sellassie continued his education at University College Addis Ababa. The French government then awarded him a fellowship to study law at Aix-en-Provence. While he was in France conspirators launched a coup against Emperor Haile Selassie. It is clear that Sahle Sellassie supported this event.

I was surprised when a student from one of the francophone countries in Western Africa told me that there was a coup in my country. Soon we, Ethiopian students, in Aix-en-Provence, Grenoble, Paris and other French cities began to communicate with letters and phone to express our solidarity to the coup.

— Sahle Sellassie Berhane Mariam, 2018

He later moved to the University of California, Los Angeles, from where he earned a master's degree in 1963. This move was supported by Wolf Leslau. Leslau had met Sahle Sellassie when he was doing fieldwork at the mission school in Emdibir. Sahle Sellassie provided Chaha Gurage texts for one of Leslau's books. Leslau published this as Ethiopia Speaks: Studies in Cultural Background. Leslau then commissioned him to write a novel in Chaha Gurage during a summer fellowship. This became Shinega's Village.

Sahle Sellassie returned to Ethiopia following his time in California. But he did not feel he got the same opportunities as others who had studied abroad. In particular, he could not get a job in a higher government office. Sahle Sellassie believed this was because he was a Gurage.

=== Shinega's Village (1964) ===
Shinega's Village is the first novel written in Chaha. It uses a modified form of the Amharic script with special characters. Leslau translated the Chacha into English, before the book was published by the University of California Press. An extract was also published in an anthology called Growing up Africa.

The novel is a series of related scenes. These show the life of a village boy from his birth in the 1940s to the birth of his first child in the 1960s. Over these years the modern world creeps into his life. First he wants to own a pair of khaki shorts. Then he takes a trip to the nearest town, which has a benzine station. Finally he makes his way to Addis Ababa. These scenes explore what it was like growing up in a rural Gurage community. They show the increasing influence of urban Ethiopian life and European technology. For some the pull of the city is great, but for others it is a place to resent.

=== ወጣት ይፍረደው (1967) ===
Sahle Sellassie's first Amharic novel, ወጣት ይፍረደው, or Let Youth Judge It, deals with love and marriage.

The book is about two friends called Ashe and Seyoum. They fall in love with Ayne-regrb and Felekech. Ayne-regrb's bodyguard frustrates her relationship with Ashe, as he is jealous. In the end, her bodyguard rapes her and she conceives. Ayne-regrb is unable to face Ashe and to avoid shaming her family she consents to marrying an elderly man. Before the wedding can take place she vanishes, leaving Ashe distraught. At the same time, Seyoum cannot settle with Felekech as she works as a prostitute. His parents disapprove of their relationship. Instead, they intend to marry him to a more respectable woman. Tessema, a friend of Seyoum's father, wants to marry Felekech himself. Tessema threatens her and she runs away to Debre Zeit. Seyoum follows and they get married and later have a child. They then return to his parents who finally give them their blessing. Debebe Seifu believes the novel lacks artistry and is very sentimental.

=== The Afersata (1969) ===
Sahle Sellassie wrote his next novel in English. The manuscript for The Afersata was sent to Heinemann for inclusion in their African Writers Series. The publisher felt the text lacked drama, but also sensed an opportunity for it to be used in Ethiopian schools. Concerns were then raised by Ethiopian government censors, who considered banning the book. Ultimately, bookshops were allowed to import and sell The Afersata, although much of its readership was international.

The title refers to a traditional method of criminal investigation and prosecution whereby the injured party calls a community meeting to launch an inquiry. At the meeting, everyone present declares the name of the suspected guilty party to a panel of elders. The novel begins with the burning of Namaga's hut and the subsequent search for the culprit through several meetings of the afersata. A number of subplots, including a Meskel celebration, are included. Ultimately, the afersata decide nothing and the arsonist is never found.

The novel has been interpreted as an effort to portray communal and self-sufficient rural life in contrast to faraway towns, although some reviewers consider it as lacking artistry.

=== Warrior King (1974) ===
It is a story told in a simple, straightforward manner, the story of a man who starts life from the dust and raises himself to the status of emperor. My intention was to show that a man is what he makes of himself. It is not true that men are made rulers over others by God. They make themselves so. And then I had some other intentions in writing the book. I read all the books on Theodorus available to me, over fifteen of them including 'Chronicles of King Theodore' Amharic ed. I went to Gondor city and stayed there several days visiting historical spots, looking for vestiges of the emperor, and inquiring people about him. But obviously it is not a history book - it is a novel based on history.

— Sahle Sellassie Berhane Mariam, 1973

Sahle Sellassie submitted another manuscript to Heinemann, but it was turned down. But the publisher agreed to include his third English-language novel in their African Writers Series. One thousand copies arrived in Addis Ababa in December 1974, months after the revolution.

Warrior King is an historical novel based on the early life of Emperor Tewodros, from his origins as a commoner to his ascension to the throne following the defeat of Ras Ali. The events take place during the Zemene Mesafint, a period in Ethiopian history between the mid-18th and mid-19th centuries when the country had no effective central authority.

Tewodros’ life was a common theme for Ethiopian novelists, and Sahle Sellassie’s novel followed three previous Amharic novels on the same theme by Makonnen Endelkachew, Berhanu Zerihun and Abe Gubegna. An English play also appeared in 1965 by Tsegaye Gabre-Medhin

The novel was received poorly, as it was seen to rely too heavily on historical documentation and a lack of dialogue.

=== Firebrands (1979) ===
Sahle Sellassie submitted the manuscript that had been rejected by Heinemann to Longman for inclusion in their Drumbeat series. The original title was The Convict of Kerchelay with a story set against the backdrop of the Ethiopian Revolution. It appears the author sensed an opportunity to be more critical of the political situation in his country, but also sensed that this may not last.

The novel's main protagonist is Bezuneh, a recent college graduate. He, his brother Worku and their friend Takori are the 'firebrands' seeking change in their country, although Bezuneh is more cautious than the others. He begins work as an auditor at a local company with the aim of addressing corruption in government office. However, he is soon offered a bribe from a wealthy local car dealer. Bezuneh turns down the bride, but then learns that Mr Richardson and his manager, His Excellency Ato Kebret, are friends. He clashes with his manager and ultimately loses his job. Bezuneh then plans to kill Ato Kebret, but is caught and sent to jail. The conflict of political ideologies and the threat of corruption are the clear themes of the novel

=== ባሻ ቅጣው (1984) ===
Following the historical fiction of Warrior King, Sahle Sellassie then turned his attention to the Italian occupation of Ethiopia with ባሻ ቅጣው, or "Punish Him".

=== Language choice ===
Sahle Sellassie has translated five novels into Amharic, including Charles Dickens' A Tale of Two Cities, Victor Hugo's Les Misérables, and Pearl S. Buck's The Mother. His own use of English has been discussed a number of times, with his very first novel, Shinega's Village, being described as a compromise in the debate on whether authors should write in an African language or a European language. The author himself made it clear in the early 1980s that he intended to only write in English, translating some of his novels into Amharic if needed.

A series of articles appeared in the Ethiopia magazine Yekatit between June 1981 and June 1983 that opened up a debate about language use between Sahle Sellassie, Asfaw Damte, and Mengistu Lemma. The debate began with the publication of the first two instalments of Asfaw Damte's "Modern Amharic Literature" series, which was intended to run to four essays. After the second essay, Sahle Sellassie published a strongly worded response, which led to further debate between the two. This was only concluded after Mengistu Lemma intervened.

Asfaw argues that African literature is any literature written in an African language, implying that there can be no Ethiopian literature in English or any other foreign language. He views the small number of works in English by Ethiopia writers as insignificant, with the exception of those by Tsegaye Gabre-Medhin, Daniachew Worku and Sahle Sellassie.

Sahle Sellassie's brief response seeks to correct Asfaw Damte, stating that works created by Ethiopians in other languages are indeed a part of Ethiopian literature, but not part of Amharic literature. He follows this with an essay of his own called "Identification of national literature". Mengistu draws this debate to a close with a compromise, stating that African literature is what we get when Africans write for other Africans. Language choice is secondary and writers should be free to experiment.

These exchanges can be seen to form part of a much wider debate about language use, which included Chinua Achebe, Ngũgĩ wa Thiong'o and others.

== Complete works ==
=== Novels ===
- Berhane Mariam, Sahle Sellassie (1966). Shinega's Village: Scenes of Ethiopian Life. Berkeley: University of California Press.
- —— (1967). ወጣት ይፍረደው ('Let Youth Judge It]). Addis Ababa: Central Printing Press.
- —— (1969). The Afersata. London: Heinemann, African Writers Series no. 52.
- —— (1974). Warrior King. London: Heinemann, African Writers Series no. 163.
- —— (1979). Firebrands. London: Longman.
- —— (1983). ባሻ ቅጣው (Punish Him]). Addis Ababa: Ethiopia Book Centre.

=== Short stories ===
- Berhane Mariam, Sahle Sellassie (1968). "Yaya Massero". Menen. 12: 2–23.
- —— (1969). "The Woman of Azer". Zuka: 37–38.

=== Translations ===
- Berhane Mariam, Sahle Sellassie (1983). የሁለት ከተማዎች ታሪክ [(A Tale of Two Cities)].
- —— (1983). መከረኞች [(Les Misérables)].
- —— (1987). እና ት (The Mother).
- ——. የኢየሱስ ሕይወት (Life of Jesus).

=== Memoir ===
- Berhane Mariam, Sahle Sellassie (2018). ፍኖተ ሕይወት (A Journey of Life). Boston: Daraku.

=== Non-fiction ===
- Berhane Mariam, Sahle Sellassie (1974). "'Yegan Mebrať, critics of African literature ignore us completely". The Ethiopian Herald.
- —— (1974). "The Novels of Daniachew Worku". The Ethiopian Herald.
- ——. "Identification of national literature". Yekatit. 5 (2).
- ——. "Talking of language and literature". Yekatit. 6 (1).
- ——. "From my sketch-book". Yekatit. 5 (4): 21–22.
- ——. "From my sketch-book". Yekatit. 6 (1): 25.
- ——. "From my sketch-book". Yekatit. 6 (2): 19–20.
- ——. "From my sketch-book". Yekatit. 6 (3): 21–22.
- ——. "From my sketch-book". Yekatit. 6 (4): 18–19.
- ——. "Review of Feqer Eska Magaber". Weyeyet. 2: 83–92.

== Sources ==
=== Books ===
- Jambere, Aberra (2000). An introduction to the legal history of Ethiopia, 1434-1974. Münster: Lit Verslag.
- Currey, James (2008). Africa Writes Back: The African Writers Series & The Launch of African Literature. Oxford: James Currey. OCLC 230198710.
- David, Jay; Harrington, Helise, eds. (1971). Growing up African. New York: Morrow.
- Leslau, Wolf (1992). Gurage Studies: Collected Articles. Wiesbaden: Harrassowitz.

=== Journal articles ===
- Abrahams, Lionel (1975). "Boycott: A matter of personal taste or public principle?". Index on Censorship. 4 (2): 10–38. doi:10.1080/03064227508532420. S2CID 144192547.
- Arnold, Stephen (Summer 1975). "Reviewed Work(s): Warrior King by Sahle Sellassie". Books Abroad. 49 (3): 594. doi:10.2307/40129715. JSTOR 40129715.
- Assefa, Taye (1983). "Tewodros in Ethiopian Historical Fiction". Journal of Ethiopian Studies. 16: 115–128. JSTOR 41965909.
- Beer, David (1977). "The Sources and Content of Ethiopian Creative Writing in English". Research in African Literatures. 8 (1): 99–124. JSTOR 3818869.
- Kluckhohn, Richard (August 1964). "Review of Shinega's Village: Scenes of Ethiopian Life". American Anthropologist. 66 (4): 942–943. doi:10.1525/aa.1964.66.4.02a00480. JSTOR 668221.
- Kurtz, J. Roger (2007). "Debating the Language of African Literature: Ethiopian Contributions". Journal of African Cultural Studies. 19 (2): 187–205. doi:10.1080/13696810701760468. JSTOR 25473388. S2CID 216148392.
- Lindfors, Bernth (Winter 1965). "Review of Shinega's Village. Scenes of Ethiopian Life". Books Abroad. 66 (4): 106. JSTOR 40119499.
- Messing, Simon (Autumn 1965). "Review of Shinega's Village. Scenes of Ethiopian Life". Middle East Journal. 19 (4): 527–528. JSTOR 4323928.

=== Theses ===
- Abraha, Negusse Aregawi (May 2019). Ideology in Four Ethiopian Novels in English (PhD). Addis Ababa University.
- Seifu, Debebe (1980). Ethiopian Literature in English (PhD). Addis Ababa University.
