= Martha Mvungi =

Tanzanian writer, academic and teacher (1943–2017)

Martha Mlagala Mvungi
- Born: Martha V. Mlagala; 19 January 1943; Kidugala, Njombe, Tanganyika Territory
- Died: 24 June 2017 (aged 74)
- Education: University of Edinburgh; University of Dar es Salaam
- Writing career
- Language: Kiswahili, English
- Period: 1970-2003
- Genres: Folklore; Biography; Children's literature

Martha Mlagala Mvungi (born Martha V. Mlagala; 19 January 1943 – 24 June 2017) was a Tanzanian novelist, short-story writer, academic and teacher. She wrote in both Kiswahili and English.

== Life ==
As a child I lived among the Hehe and shared a lot of their social and communal activities. Much of what I learnt in those years is reflected in this collection of tales and the happy times I spent with friends at Ilula and Balali are crystalized here...When my parents moved to live among my own people, the Bena, I heard even more variations of these same stories although the basic structures had not changed.

— Martha Mvungi, in her introduction to Three Solid Stones

Mvungi was born on 19 January 1943, in Kidugala, Njombe, in what was then Tanganyika Territory. She was the second child of Jeremiah Mlagala, a pastor, and Dzitumulike Mhehwa. A member of the Bena people, she received her earliest education among the Hehe. This included time at Ilula Primary School as well as Tabora Girls, finishing in 1961.

Mvungi went on to teacher training college and then to the University of Edinburgh. She graduated in 1968 and returned to Tanzania. In 1972, she married, and in 1974 she completed her master's degree at the University of Dar es Salaam. She titled her thesis Language Policy in Tanzanian Primary Schools with Emphasis on Implementation. Her research showed the importance of language in the cognitive and emotional development of children.

As a member of the Department of Education at the University of Dar es Salaam, Mvungi rose to the position of senior lecturer in 1982. In the same year she completed her PhD thesis, The Relationship Between Performance in the Instructional Medium and Some Secondary School Subjects in Tanzania. This continued the theme explored in her earlier work. Specifically, it demonstrated the relationship between proficiency in the language of instruction and educational performance.

I have been in the school business all my life, starting as lecturer and teacher. I had always in my mind to set up a quality school.

— Martha Mvungi, on establishing ESACS Academy

Mvungi then joined the UNESCO National Commission as Secretary General in 1982. In 1990, she was appointed Permanent Secretary for the Ministry of Health. She also served as director of the Training Fund for Tanzania Women. In 1995, she founded ESACS Academy, an international secondary school in Dar es Salaam. She ran the school until 2015.

Martha Mvungi died on 24 June 2017, aged 74.

== Writing ==
Mvungi's first published writing appeared in 1970 under her maiden name Martha V. Mlagala. 'Was it an illusion?' featured in Darlite, a students' literary magazine based at the Department of Literature, University of East Africa. It is a story about a young woman who leaves her school in Njombe to follow her lover to Dar es Salaam. But once in the city, her lover abandons her, and she struggles to return home. Forced to rely on the driver of an oil truck travelling the Tanzan Highway to get home, she finds herself vulnerable and terrified.

Mvungi's student writing continued with a biography of Lulapangilo Zakaria Mhemedzi, a resident of her home village of Kidugala whom she interviewed in 1970. John Iliffe included this in a collection of Tanzanian biographies.

Mvungi went on to publish six books between 1975 and 2003, in both Kiswahili and English. Two further books, The Voice and Writing off a Debt in Ngorongoro Crater, were never published. Her work also featured in several anthologies. This includes Unwinding Threads: Writing by Women in Africa and The Heinemann Book of African Women's Writing.

The tales are fantasies full of magic, mystery and frequently grotesque details of cannibalism, murder and sorcery. Several are love stories, some are just-so stories and some are animal tales, including a Tanzanian version of Br'er Rabbit and the tar baby. Most are cautionary tales warning against jealousy, disobedience and seduction and exhorting loyalty, courage and kindness. The author has retold them in a clear and engaging manner that both children and adults will enjoy. For the student, they provide a valuable insight into East African culture.

— R. E. Morsberger, on Three Solid Stones

Heinemann published Mvungi's first, and only, book in English in 1975. Released as number 159 in the African Writers Series, Three Solid Stones is a collection of folktales. Mvungi was the second Tanzanian writer to appear in the series, after Peter Palangyo, and the first Tanzanian woman. James Currey, the series editor, had reservations about the inclusion of oral literature, and felt that Three Solid Stones lacked lustre.

In the same year, Mvungi published Hana Hatia, a detective story designed to illustrate the family crisis in contemporary African society. In her novel, Mvungi tells the story of Petro, who leaves his devoted wife, Maria, for a mistress. Maria, unable to support herself in the city, returns home to an Ujamaa village. There she finds fulfilment as a schoolteacher.

Mvungi then turned to children's literature with Yasin's Dilemma (1985) and Yasin in Trouble (1990). Her final book, Lwidiko (2003), criticises corruption in contemporary Tanzanian society.

== Complete works ==
- Mlagala, Martha V. (1970). "Was it an illusion?". Darlite. IV (2): 34–38.
- Mlagala, Martha V. (1973). "The Traveller: Lulapangilo Zakaria Mhemedzi". In Iliffe, John (ed.). Modern Tanzanians: A Volume of Biographies. East African Publishing House. pp. 115–132.
- Mvungi, Martha (1975a). Three solid stones. London: Heinemann.
- —— (1975b). Hana Hatia (in Swahili). Dar es Salaam: Tanzania Publishing House.
- —— (1982). Chale Anatumwa Sokoni (in Swahili). Dar es Salaam: Shudutonya Publishing Enterprise.
- —— (1976). "Interactions between education, culture and communication in Tanzania's socio-economic development: a historical presentation". Educafrica: Bulletin of the Unesco Regional Office for Education in Africa. 11: 147–162.
- —— (1985). Yasin's Dilemma. Dar es Salaam: Shudutonya Publishing Enterprise.
- —— (1990). Yasin in Trouble. Nairobi: Heinemann.
- —— (2003). Lwidiko (in Swahili). Dar es Salaam: Tanzania Publishing House.

== Sources ==
- Arnold, Stephen (1986). "Tanzania". In Gérard, Albert S. (ed.). European-language Writing in Sub-Saharan Africa. John Benjamins Publishing Company. pp. 949–960.
- Barkan, Sandra (1990). African Literatures: Retrospectives and Perspectives. Three Continents Press.
- Callaci, Emily (2017). Street Archives and City Life. Durham, North Carolina: Duke University Press. ISBN 9780822369844. JSTOR j.ctv125jg7z.
- Cutura, Jozefina (2007). Voices of Women Entrepreneurs in Tanzania (PDF). Washington, DC: International Finance Corporation.
- Currey, James (2008). Africa Writes Back: The African Writers Series and the Launch of African Literature. Oxford: James Currey.
- Fister, Barbara (1995). Third World Women's Literatures: A Dictionary and Guide to Materials in English. Westport, Connecticut: Greenwood Press.
- Matzke, Christine (1996). "A Preliminary Checklist of East African Women Writers". Matatu: Journal for African Culture and Society. 15–16 (1): 201–244. doi:10.1163/18757421-90000188.
- Morsberger, R. E. (1976). "Reviewed Work(s): Three Solid Stones by Martha Mvungi". Books Abroad. 50 (4): 940. JSTOR 40131248.
- Qorro, Martha A. S. (2013). "Language of instruction in Tanzania: Why are research findings not heeded?". International Review of Education. 59 (1): 29–45. JSTOR 42636126.
- Saiwaad, Abdullah (2 July 2017). "PEOPLE IN THE NEWS: Mvungi: Author, educationist, mother". The Citizen. Dar es Salaam.
