= Mbella Sonne Dipoko =

Cameroonian writer and artist (1936–2009)

- Born: February 28, 1936; Douala, Cameroon
- Died: December 5, 2009 (aged 73); Tiko, Cameroon
- Occupations: Writer and artist

Mbella Sonne Dipoko (February 28, 1936, in Douala – December 5, 2009, in Tiko) was a novelist, poet and painter from Cameroon. He is widely considered to be one of the foremost writers of literature in English from Cameroon.

== Early life ==
Mbella Sonne Dipoko was born in Douala, Cameroon, to Paul Sonne Dipoko, who was the Chief of Missaka. Mbella took over as Chief of Missaka after his father died in 1990.

As a young man, Dipoko worked for the Cameroon Development Corporation as an accounts clerk in the year 1956. The following year, 1957, he started working as a reporter for the Nigerian Broadcasting Corporation. continuing until 1968. During this period of employment with the Nigerian Broadcasting Corporation, he served as their reporter from France. In 1960, he started further studies in Paris, at the age of 24. For a couple of years, he studied Law and Economics at the Université de Paris, and then abandoned his studies to pursue his interest in writing. It was during this time when he was studying in Paris that he began his writing career.

His first piece of writing was the novel A Few Nights and Days, which was published in 1966. That same year, he wrote the story "Helping the Revolution", which was set in apartheid-era South Africa. After publishing his third novel, he returned to university in America, where he studied and earned a degree in Anglo-American studies, majoring in English.

He died aged 73 in Tiko, Cameroon, on December 5, 2009.

== Major works ==
- A Few Nights and Days. London: Longman, 1966.
- Because of Women. London: Heinemann Educational Books, 1969. African Writers Series, 57.
- Black and White in Love. London: Heinemann Educational Books, 1972. African Writers Series, 107.

== Other works ==
- "Helping the Revolution: a story". The New African, 1966
- "Inheritors of The Mungo". Présence Africaine, 1971
- "My People". Présence Africaine, 1970
- "Overseas". African Arts, 1970
- "Palabres". Présence Africaine, 1967
- "Pris au piège". Présence Africaine, 1962
- "Our Life". Transition, 1963
- "Creative Hope". Transition,' 1962
- "Transient Might". Transition, 1962
- "Promise". Transition, 1962
- "Cultural Diplomacy in African Writing". Africa Today, 1968
- "The First Return". Présence Africaine, 1967
- "Be a Guide". Transition, 1964
- "Mass Exile". Transition, 1964
- "Racism and the Eloquence of May". Présence Africaine, 1968
- "To Pre-Colonial Africa". Transition, 1964
- "Our Destiny". Transition, 1964
- "Progress". Présence Africaine, 1966
- "Marching through marshes". Présence Africaine, 1963
