= Zambia Shall Be Free =

1962 political autobiography by Kenneth Kaunda

- Author: Kenneth Kaunda
- Series: African Writers Series
- Publisher: Heinemann Educational Books
- Publication date: 1 April 1963
- Media type: Print
- Pages: 202

Zambia Shall Be Free is a 1962 political autobiography by Zambia's first president Kenneth Kaunda published as part of the Heinemann African Writers Series. The book is a critique of colonial rule, and the power of democracy in liberating the varied people ruled in the new Zambia.

The contemporary journal reviewer for African Affairs described the work as a "haphazard sketch of the victorious approach of Northern Rhodesia to emancipation", calling the narrative "polemical" and "factually unreliable". The Journal of Modern African Studies reviewer J. G. Markham was more sympathetic, reading the biography as a strong understanding of Kaunda's development of his political career, and highlighting the tension between Kaunda's participation in violence in the Zambia African Congress and his subsequent justification of that violence in seeking independence.
