= Leonard Kibera =

Kenyan novelist

- Born: 8 October 1942; Kenya
- Died: 19 July 1983 (aged 40); Kenya
- Occupations: Novelist, poet
- Known for: African poet, Kenyan poet

Leonard Kibera (1942–1983) was a Kenyan novelist and short story writer, famous for his novel Voices in the Dark (1970) and short story collection Potent Ash (1968). He was awarded third prize in the African drama contest by the British Broadcasting Company (BBC) in 1967 for his contributions to African literature.

== Life ==
Leonard Kibera was born in Kenya on 8 October 1942 in the family of Elizabeth Nduta and James Kibera and three other siblings.

After graduating high school at Embu, Kenya, he studied at the University of California and at Stanford University.

Later in his life, from 1976 he taught at the University of Zambia and the Kenyatta University in Kenya until his passing.

== Influences ==
As an undergraduate at the University of Nairobi, Kibera was mentored by Ngũgĩ wa Thiong'o. He was influenced by Ngũgĩ's sense of relationship, and concerns regarding the modern compared to cultural traditions of the past. A major difference between the works of the two is the fact that the protagonists of Kibera are often rebellious or misfits.

== Works ==
- (with Samuel Kahiga) Potent Ash. East African Publishing House, 1968.
- Voices in the Dark. Modern African Library, 1970.
