= I. N. C. Aniebo =

Nigerian novelist and short story writer (born 1939) (

Ifeanyichukwu Ndubuisi Chikezie Aniebo, commonly known as I. N. C. Aniebo (born 31 January 1939), is a Nigerian novelist and short story writer, who has been called "the master craftsman of the Nigerian short story".

Aniebo trained as an artillery officer; his first stories were written under a pseudonym to avoid censorship. He fought for Biafra in the Nigerian Civil War, and The Anonymity of Sacrifice (1974) gives a sense of the horrors and personal conflicts of that war. Aniebo subsequently studied at the University of California, Los Angeles, before returning to Nigeria in 1979 to teach Creative Writing and Literature at the English Department of the University of Port Harcourt.

== Works ==
Novels

- The Anonymity of Sacrifice. African Writers Series 148. London: Heinemann Educational, 1974.
- The Journey Within. African Writers Series 206. London: Heinemann, 1978.
- Rearguard Actions. Ibadan, Nigeria: Heinemann Educational Books, 1998.

Short story collections

- Of Wives, Talismans and the Dead. London: Heinemann, 1983.
- Man of the Market: Short Stories. Port Harcourt: Pam Unique, 1994.

Individual short stories

- "The Jealous Goddess," in Spear (Lagos), October 1963.
- "My Mother," in Sunday Times (Lagos), 22 December 1963.
- "The Ring," in Nigeria Magazine (Lagos), December 1964.
- "The Peacemakers," in Nigeria Magazine (Lagos), December 1965.
- "Shadows," in Black Orpheus 20 (Lagos), 1966.
- "Mirage," in Nigeria Magazine (Lagos), March 1966.
- "The Outing," in Happy Home and Family Life (Lagos), May 1972.
- "Happy Survival, Brother," in Ufahamu (Los Angeles), vol. 7, no. 3, 1977.
