= Gerald Moore (scholar) =

English scholar (1924–2022)

- Born: 22 August 1924; Chiswick, London, England
- Died: 27 December 2022 (aged 98); Sussex, England
- Education: Emmanuel College, Cambridge
- Occupation: Independent scholar
- Notable work: Modern Poetry from Africa (1963)

Gerald Moore (22 August 1924 – 27 December 2022) was an English independent scholar.

== Biography ==
Moore was born in Chiswick, London, to Rex Moore, an exhibitions officer, and his wife, Norah (nee Sturdee), an actor, on 22 August 1924. He went to Dauntsey's School in Wiltshire, and when he was 17 years old joined the Royal Navy, serving in the Atlantic and Arctic convoys during World War 2. He later studied at Emmanuel College, Cambridge, where he earned a first-class degree in English.

Moore taught at many universities, including the Sussex, Hong Kong, Makerere, Ife, Port Harcourt, Jos and the University of Wisconsin-Madison. His last teaching post was at Trieste. He was primarily a scholar of contemporary African anglophone and francophone poetry. With Ulli Beier, he edited the influential Modern Poetry from Africa (1963), a comprehensive anthology, republished in 1984 as The Penguin Book of Modern African Poetry.

== Personal life ==
In 1949, he married Joy Fisher, a librarian, with whom he had three children. The couple divorced in 1973, and Moore subsequently married Miriam Garzitto.

Moore lived in Worthing, Sussex, before moving to Udine in Italy. He later returned to Sussex, in 2010, after his wife Miriam died. Moore died on 27 December 2022, at the age of 98.

== Major works ==
- Seven African Writers. London: Oxford University Press, 1962.
- Modern Poetry from Africa (ed. with Ulli Beier). Harmondsworth: Penguin, 1963 (Penguin African Books). Revised as The Penguin Book of Modern African Poetry, 4th edition, 1999.
- African Literature and the Universities. Ibadan: Ibadan University Press (for Congress for Cultural Freedom, 1965.
- The Chosen Tongue: English Writing in the Tropical World. Harlow: Longmans, 1969.
- Wole Soyinka. London: Evans Brothers, 1971.
- Twelve African Writers. London: Hutchinson, 1980 (University Library for Africa).

As translator:

- Beti, Mongo. The Poor Christ of Bomba. Long Grove, Illinois: Waveland, 2005.
- Beti, Mongo. Remember Ruben. Heinemann, London, 1980
- Tchicaya U Tam'si. Selected Poems. Heinemann, London, 1970
- Lopes, Henri. The Laughing Cry. Readers International, London, 1987
