= Dominic Mulaisho =

Governor of the Bank of Zambia
- In office 1992–1995

Personal details
- Born: 15 August 1933; Feria, Northern Rhodesia
- Died: 1 July 2013 (aged 79); Lusaka, Zambia
- Education: University College of Rhodesia

Dominic Mulaisho (born 15 August 1933 in Feira, Northern Rhodesia – died Lusaka, Zambia 1 July 2013) was a Zambian novelist and civil servant. He was the Governor of the Bank of Zambia from 1992 to 1995.

He is also known for his two novels The Tongue of the Dumb (1973) and The Smoke that Thunders (1979).

He was educated at University College of Rhodesia.
