= Cosmo Pieterse =

South African writer and actor (1930–2016)

- Born: Cosmo George Leipoldt Pieterse; 10 March 1930; Windhoek, Namibia
- Died: 25 November 2016 (aged 86); Garfield Heights, Ohio, U.S.
- Education: University of Cape Town
- Occupations: Playwright, actor, poet, literary critic, broadcaster and anthologist

Cosmo George Leipoldt Pieterse (10 March 1930 – 25 November 2016) was a South African playwright, actor, poet, literary critic and anthologist.

== Life and career ==
Cosmo George Leipoldt Pieterse was born in Windhoek, Namibia in 1930. He went to the University of Cape Town and taught in Cape Town until leaving South Africa in 1965. Pieterse was banned under the Riotous Assemblies Act of 1962. He subsequently taught in London and at Ohio University in the United States: arriving at Ohio University in 1970, he became a tenured faculty member in 1976. However, after travelling to meet his London publisher in 1979 he was denied re-entry to the US on classified information, allegedly for being "a suspected communist".

In London, in the later 1960s and early '70s, Pieterse worked for the BBC World Service at Bush House and for the Transcription Centre, an organisation that under the direction of Dennis Duerden recorded and broadcast the works of African writers in Europe and Africa. Also an occasional actor, Pieterse appeared in The Burning, a 1968 30-minute short drama film directed by Stephen Frears. As a poet, Pieterse has been characterised as producing work that is very "European in its tone, metaphors, and delivery", as Laura Linda Holland writes: "Cosmo Pieterse's poems, like those of [Dennis] Brutus, are heavily inundated with Western influences, concerns, and motifs while retaining a definite African bias....Cosmo Pieterse uses his love of words to create poetry of hope and renewal."

He edited several anthologies of plays and poetry for the African Writers Series published by Heinemann.

Pieterse died in Garfield Heights, Ohio on 25 November 2016, at the age of 86.

== Works edited ==
- Ten One-act Plays. London: Heinemann Educational Books, African Writers Series 34, 1968.
- (with Donald Munro) Protest & Conflict in African Literature, Heinemann Educational, 1969.
- Seven South African Poets: Poems of Exile. African Writers Series 64. London: Heinemann Educational, 1971.
- Short African Plays. London: Heinemann, African Writers Series 78, 1972.
- Five African Plays. London: Heinemann, African Writers Series 114, 1972.
- (with Dennis Duerden) African Writers Talking: a collection of radio interviews, Holmes & Meier, 1972.
- (with Gwyneth Henderson) Nine African Plays for Radio. London: Heinemann, African Writers Series 114, 1973.
- Echo and Choruses: "Ballad of the Cells", and selected shorter poems, 1974.
- (with George Hallett) Present Lives Future Becoming: South African Landscape in Words and Pictures. Guildford: Hickory Press Ltd, 1974.
- (with Angus Calder and Jack Mapanje) Summer Fires: New Poetry of Africa - an anthology of entries from the BBC Arts and Africa Poetry Award. Heinemann Educational Books, 1983.
- (with Amelia House) Nelson Mandelamandla. Three Continents Press, 1989.
