= Calixthe Beyala =

Cameroonian-French novelist

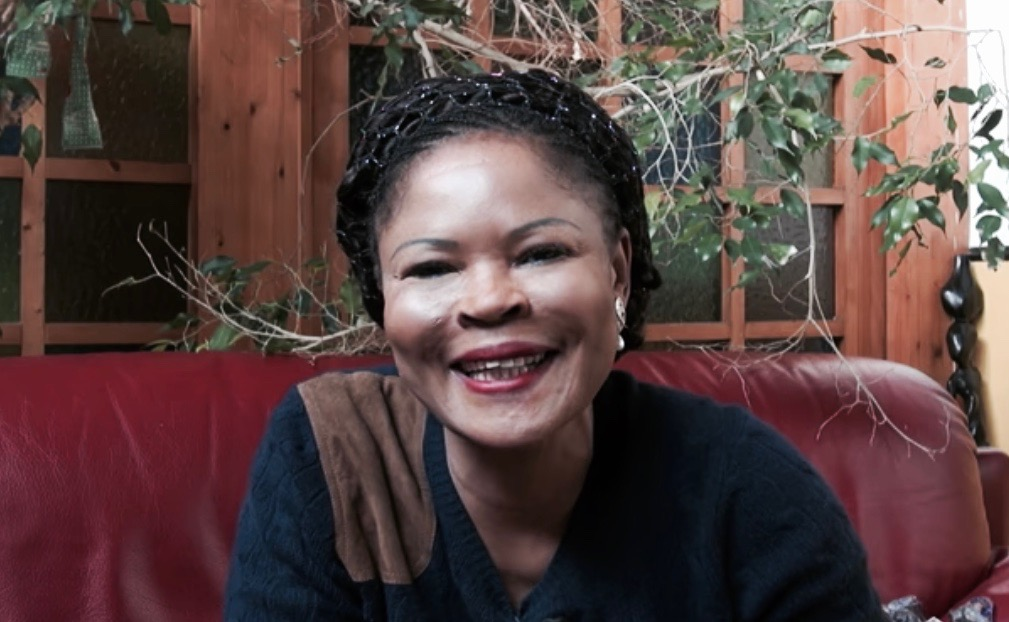
- Occupation: Novelist
- Writing career
- Notable works: Asséze l'Africaine, Les Honneurs perdus
- Notable awards: Grand prix littéraire d'Afrique noire (1994), Grand prix du roman de l'Académie française (1998)
- Website: calixthe.beyala.free.fr

Calixthe Beyala is a Cameroonian-French writer who writes in French.

== Early life and education ==
A Cameroonian author and member of the Eton people, Calixthe Beyala was born in Sa'a to Cameroonian parents.

Her aunt and grandmother were particularly strong influences on her development, and she grew up listening to her grandmother's stories. Stories from which she drew inspiration and used to motivate her to work hard toward the creation of a meaningful career.

Beyala was educated at the École Principale du Camp Mboppi in Douala and went on to study at the Lycée des Rapides à Bangui and the Lycée Polyvalent de Douala.

She eventually won a scholarship to study in Paris at 17, where she obtained a baccalaureate.

== Career ==
After a few years in Spain she published her first book, C'est le soleil qui m'a brûlée, at the age of 23 and eventually chose to become a full-time writer.

== Awards ==
- 1998 - Le Prix comité français de l'UNESCO
- 1996 – Grand Prix du Roman de l'Académie Française
- 1994 – Prix François Mauriac de l'Académie Française
- 1994 – Prix tropique
- 1993 – Grand prix littéraire de l'Afrique noire

== Works ==
- C'est le soleil qui m'a brûlée 1987 Oxford: Heinemann; Librio, 1997, ISBN 978-2-277-30165-3
- Tu t'appelleras Tanga, Stock, 1988, ISBN 978-2-234-02142-6
- Seul le Diable le savait, Pré aux Clercs, 1990, ISBN 978-2-7144-2476-1
- La négresse rousse (1991); Éd. J'ai lu, 1997, ISBN 978-2-290-04601-2
- Le petit prince de Belleville, A. Michel, 1992, ISBN 978-2-226-05934-5
- Maman a un amant, Editions J'ai lu, 1993, ISBN 9782290313770—Grand Prize of Literature of Black Africa
- Assèze l'Africaine, A. Michel, 1994, ISBN 9782226069986 -- François Mauriac Prize of the Académie française
- Lettre d'une africaine à ses sœurs occidentales, Spengler, 1995
- Les Honneurs perdus, A. Michel, 1996, ISBN 978-2-226-08693-8 -- Grand Prix du roman de l'Académie française
- La petite fille du réverbère, Albin Michel, 1998, ISBN 9782226095916—Grand Prize of Unicef
- Amours sauvages Albin Michel, 1999, ISBN 978-2-226-10818-0; J'ai lu, 2000, ISBN 978-2-290-30902-5
- Lettre d'une Afro-française à ses compatriotes, Mango, 2000, ISBN 978-2-84270-232-8
- Comment cuisiner son mari à l'africaine, Albin Michel, 2000, ISBN 978-2-226-11676-5
- Les arbres en parlent encore…, Librairie générale française, 2004, ISBN 978-2-253-06776-4
- Femme nue, femme noire, Albin Michel, 2003, ISBN 978-2-226-13790-6
- La plantation, Albin Michel, 2005, ISBN 978-2-226-15835-2
- L'homme qui m'offrait le ciel: roman, Albin Michel, 2007, ISBN 978-2-226-17715-5
- Le Roman de Pauline: roman, Paris, Albin Michel, 2009
- Les Lions indomptables, Paris, Albin Michel, 2010
- Le Christ selon l'Afrique, roman, Paris, Albin Michel, 2014

=== English translations ===
- Loukoum: the 'little prince' of Belleville, Translator Marjolijn De Jager, Heinemann, 1995, ISBN 978-0-435-90968-0
- The sun hath looked upon me, Translator Marjolijn De Jager, Heinemann, 1996, ISBN 978-0-435-90951-2
- Your name shall be Tanga, Translator Marjolijn De Jager, Heinemann, 1996, ISBN 978-0-435-90950-5
- How to Cook Your Husband the African Way, Translator David Cohen, Psychology News Press, 2016, ISBN 978-0-907-63336-5
