= Molefe Pheto =

South African musician, educator and activist (born 1935)

- Born: 1935 (age 90–91); Alexandra Township, Union of South Africa
- Occupations: Musician; Teacher; Activist
- Years active: 1970–present
- Notable work: And Night Fell: Memoirs of a Political Prisoner in South Africa

Molefe Pheto (born 1935) is a former South African musician and music teacher who, as an activist in the Black Consciousness Movement, became a political prisoner in 1975. He was a friend and spokesperson of South African President Nelson Mandela.

== Early life ==
Pheto was born in 1935 in Alexandra Township, South Africa, where he grew up.

== Career ==
Pheto was an active participant in the Black Consciousness Movement since 1970. In 1971, he founded the Black Consciousness group Mhloti, working with others such as Wally Serote, producing music, poetry, and theatrical events and performing speeches by political activists and schools, churches and political rallies. Pheto organised three Black Arts festivals for MDALI (the Music, Drama, Arts and Literature Institute in Soweto), of which he was a founder member and spokesman, and in 1975 he was detained under South Africa's 1963 Terrorism Act for 10 months. He was held in Johannesburg's police headquarters, John Vorster Square.

In 1977, Pheto left South Africa and, after the murder of Steve Biko, began a life of exile in Britain. In 1983, London-based Allison & Busby published his memoir, And Night Fell: Memoirs of a Political Prisoner in South Africa, which was banned in South Africa.

After 20 years in Britain, Pheto returned to South Africa and settled on a farm in Magaliesburg, publishing his second book, entitled The Bull from Moruleng: Vistas of Home and Exile, in 2014. He is a member of the Azanian People's Organisation (AZAPO).

== Bibliography ==
- And Night Fell: Memoirs of a Political Prisoner in South Africa, London: Allison and Busby, 1983.
- The Bull from Moruleng: Vistas of Home and Exile, Ekaam Books, 2014.
