= Donatus Nwoga =

Nigerian poetry critic and professor of African literature 1933–1991)

Donatus Ibeakwadalam Nwoga
- Born: Donatus Ibeakwadalam Nwoga; 30 July 1933; Mbaise, Imo State, Nigeria
- Died: 1991 (aged 57–58)
- Education: University of London; Queen's University Belfast
- Occupations: Literary critic; Academic; Professor
- Years active: ?—1991
- Notable work: West African Verse: An Anthology, and Poetic Heritage: Igbo Traditional Verse

Donatus Nwoga (30 July 1933 – 1991) was a poetry critic and professor of African literature at the University of Nigeria, Nsukka.

== Early life and education ==
Nwoga was from Mbaise in Imo State, Nigeria. He studied at St Brigid's School, Ahiara. In the 1950s, Nwoga studied at the University of London and then at Queen's University Belfast, where he attended classes with the poet Seamus Heaney. Nwoga was a founding editor of the student magazine Gorgon and likely the first person to publish Heaney's work.

== Research ==
Nwoga and Romanus Egudu researched Igbo poetry and published a collection of translated into English. Nwoga taught with Chinua Achebe in the Faculty of Arts at the University of Nigeria, Nsukka.

He was a member of organisations including the African Literature Association, the International African Institute, the Association for Commonwealth Language and Literature Studies, and The Folklore Society.

=== Publications ===
Nwoga was the author of West African Verse: An Anthology, and Poetic Heritage: Igbo Traditional Verse, among other publications. This publication was the source of Odekhiren Amaize's published recital of 17 WEST AFRICAN VERSES

== Death and legacy ==
Following Nwoga's death in 1991, Heaney wrote a tribute to him titled "A Dog Was Crying Tonight in Wicklow Also".

The Institute of African Studies at the University of Nigeria, Nsukka, launched a Dictionary of Igbo Proverbs in Nwoga's honour.

A memorial lecture was in Nwoga's name was created at the University of Nigeria, Nsukka. In the opening remarks of the 2020 lecture, Dean of the Faculty of Arts Nnanyelugo Okoro described Nwoga as "a humanist and intellectual elephant.

Odekhiren Amaize’s 2022 recital of all selected 17 verses as well as the accompanying lecture notes for individual verse videos on YouTube are from Donatus I. Nwoga's "West African Verse: An Anthology." Prentice Hall Press, 1967
