= Kenya Literature Bureau =

- Formerly: East African Literature Bureau
- Company type: State owned corporation
- Industry: Publishing house
- Founded: 1947; 78 years ago
- Founder: British High Commission
- Headquarters: Nairobi, Kenya
- Website: kenyaliteraturebureau.com

The Kenya Literature Bureau (KLB) is a publishing house and state corporation in Kenya founded in 1947. It is located in South-C off Popo Road in Nairobi.

== History ==
The Kenya Literature Bureau was initially established by the "East Africa governments (Kenya, Tanzania and Uganda)" in 1947 as the East African Literature Bureau as an "offshoot" of the missionary-owned Ndia Kuu Press in order to publish books for the general public in Kiswahili, East African vernacular languages and English. The Bureau's first director was Charles Granston Richards, who held that post for fifteen years.

The regional status continued after independence with the establishment of the East African Community (EAC). In the early 1970s the Bureau published many pioneering anthologies of English-language poetry from East Africa:

It is significant of East African writers' indifference to political boundaries that such anthologies were all compiled, without a single exception, on an inter-territorial basis, with Kenya and Uganda supplying the greater part of the material. They [were] often multiracial as well, incorporating contributions by European and Asian writers.

However, in 1977, the EAC collapsed and the reins of the bureau were transferred to the Kenyan Ministry of Education thereby making it a department under that ministry. In 1980, the KLB Act was passed by the Kenyan Parliament making it a state corporation—a status it holds to this day.

== Book series ==
- Early Travellers in East Africa
