= Mongo Beti =

Exiled Cameroonian author and polemicist (1932–2001)

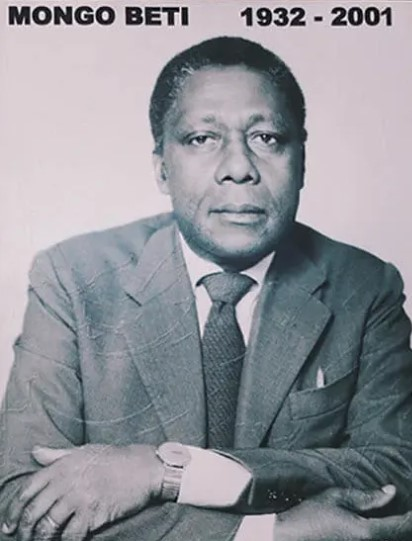
- Born: Alexandre Biyidi Awala; 30 June 1932; Mbalmayo
- Died: 8 October 2001 (aged 69); Douala
- Occupation: Cameroonian writer
- Spouse: Odile Tobner
- Writing career
- Pen name: Mongo Beti; Eza Boto
- Language: French
- Notable awards: Prix Sainte-Beuve (1958)

Alexandre Biyidi Awala (30 June 1932 – 8 October 2001), known as Mongo Beti or Eza Boto, was a Cameroonian author and polemicist. Beti has been called one of the most perceptive French-African writers in his presentations of African life.

The Guardian has noted that "Beti must be counted as one of the foremost African writers of the independence generation."

Beti spent much of his life in France, studying at the Sorbonne and becoming a professor at Lycée Pierre Corneille.

== Life ==
Though he lived in exile for many decades, Beti's life reveals an unflagging commitment to improvement of his home country. As one critic wrote after his death: "The militant path of this essayist, chronicler and novelist has been governed by one obsession: the quest for the dignity of African people."

=== Early life ===
The son of Oscar Awala and Régine Alomo, Alexandre was born in 1932 at Akométan, a small village 10 km from Mbalmayo, itself 45 km away from Yaoundé, the capital of Cameroon.

From an early age, Beti was influenced by the currents of rebellion sweeping Africa in the wake of World War II. His father drowned when Beti was seven, and he was raised by his mother and extended family. Beti recalls arguing with his mother about religion and colonialism; he also recalls early exposure to the opinions and analysis of independence leader Ruben Um Nyobe, both in the villages and at Nyobe's private residence. He carried these views into the classroom, and was eventually expelled from the missionary school in Mbalmayo for his outspokenness. In 1945 he entered the lycée Leclerc in Yaoundé. Graduating in 1951, he came to France to continue his higher education in literature, first at Aix-en-Provence, then at the Sorbonne in Paris.

=== Early writing and exile ===
By the early 1950s, Beti had turned to writing as a vehicle of protest. He wrote regularly for the journal Présence Africaine; among his pieces was a review "Afrique noire, littérature rose" about Camara Laye's novel The Dark Child. "He takes Laye to task for pandering to French metropolitan readers with false images of Africa that efface colonial injustice." Beti began his career in fiction with the short story "Sans haine et sans amour" ("Without hatred or love"), published in the periodical Présence Africaine, edited by Alioune Diop, in 1953. Beti's first novel Ville cruelle ("Cruel City"), under the pseudonym "Eza Boto", followed in 1954, published over several editions of Présence Africaine.

It was, however, in 1956 that he gained a widespread reputation; the publication of the novel Le pauvre Christ de Bomba ("The poor Christ of Bomba") created a scandal because of its satirical and biting description of the missionary and colonial world. Under pressure from the religious hierarchy, the colonial administrator in Cameroon banned the novel in the colony. This was followed by Mission terminée, 1957 (winner of the Prix Sainte Beuve 1958), and Le Roi miraculé, 1958. He also worked during this time for the review Preuves, for which he reported from Africa. He worked also as a substitute teacher at the lycée of Rambouillet.

In 1959, he was named certified professor at the lycée Henri Avril in Lamballe. He took the Agrégation de Lettres classiques in 1966 and taught at the Lycée Pierre Corneille in Rouen from this date until 1994. Following Nyobe's assassination by French forces in 1958, however, Beti fell silent as a writer for more than a decade, remaining in exile from his homeland. After his death, Odile Tobner noted that exile was not easy on Beti; he remained tortured by his concern for his embattled country.

=== Later career ===
In 1972 he re-entered the world of literature with a bang. His book Main basse sur le Cameroun ("Cruel hand on Cameroon, autopsy of a decolonisation") was censored upon its publication by the French Ministry of the Interior Raymond Marcellin on the request, brought forward by Jacques Foccart, of the Cameroon government, represented in Paris by the ambassador Ferdinand Oyono. The essay, a critical history of recent Cameroon, asserted that Cameroon and other colonies remained under French control in all but name, and that the post-independence political elites had actively fostered this continued dependence. Beti was inspired to write in part by the execution of Ernest Ouandie by the government of Cameroon. In 1974 he published Perpétue and Remember Ruben; the latter was the first in a trilogy exploring the life and impact of Nyobe. After a long judicial action, Mongo Beti and his editor François Maspéro finally obtained, in 1976, the cancellation of the ban on the publication of Main basse.

Beti returned to critical and political writing at the same time that he returned to fiction. In 1978 he and his wife Odile Tobner launched the bimonthly review Peuples Noirs. Peuples africains (Black People. African People), which was published until 1991. This review chronicled and denounced tirelessly the ills brought to Africa by neo-colonial regimes. During this period were published the novels La ruine presque cocasse d'un polichinelle (1979), Les deux mères de Guillaume Ismaël Dzewatama futur camionneur (1983), La revanche de Guillaume Ismaël Dzewatama (1984), also Lettre ouverte aux Camerounais ou la deuxième mort de Ruben Um Nyobé (1984) and Dictionnaire de la négritude (1989, with Odile Tobner). Frustrated by what he saw as the failure of post-independence governments to bring genuine freedom to Africa, Beti adopted a more radical perspective in these works.

In exile, he remained vitally connected to the struggle in Cameroon. Throughout the 1970s and 1980s, acquaintance with Beti or his work could spell trouble for a citizen of Cameroon; on numerous occasions, Beti used his connections in France to rescue one of his young readers, many of whom knew him from his periodical and his polemical essays. Ambroise Kom, arrested merely for subscribing to Peuples noirs, was saved from incarceration by Beti's actions in France on his behalf.

=== Final years ===
In 1991 Beti returned to Cameroon, after 32 years of self-imposed exile. In 1993 he published La France contre l'Afrique, retour au Cameroun; this book chronicles his visits to his homeland. After retiring from teaching in 1994, he returned to Cameroon permanently. Various business endeavours in Betiland failed; eventually, he opened in Yaoundé the Librairie des Peuples noirs (Bookstore of the Black Peoples) and organised agricultural activities in his village of Akometam. The goal of the bookshop was to encourage engaged literacy in the capital, and also to provide an outlet for critical texts and authors.

During this period, Beti also supported John Fru Ndi, an anglophone opposition leader. He created associations for the defence of citizens and gave to the press numerous articles of protest. The government attempted to hinder his activities. On his first return to Cameroon, police prevented him from speaking at a scheduled conference; Beti instead addressed a crowd outside the locked conference room. He was subjected in January 1996, in the streets of Yaoundé, to police aggression. He was challenged at a demonstration in October 1997. In response he published several novels: L'histoire du fou in 1994 then the two initial volumes Trop de soleil tue l'amour (1999) and Branle-bas en noir et blanc (2000), of a trilogy which would remain unfinished.

He was hospitalised in Yaoundé on 1 October 2001 for acute hepatic and kidney failure which remained untreated for lack of dialysis. Transported to the hospital at Douala on 6 October, he died there on 8 October 2001. Some critics noted the similarity of his death to that of his heroine Perpetua, who also died while awaiting treatment in one of the country's overburdened hospitals.

== Work ==
From beginning to end, Beti's work was informed by two principles. In terms of style, he was a realist. In a critical statement published in 1955, he asserted that "Given the modern conceptions of the beautiful in literature, given at the very least these essential conceptions, if a work is realistic it has many chances of being good; if not, supposing even that it has formal qualities, it risks lacking resonance, profundity, that of which all literature has the greatest need – the human; from which it follows that it has much less chance of being good – if only it had some – than a realistic work." Beti's fiction remains true to this credo. Thematically, Beti's work is unified by an unwavering commitment to combatting colonialism, both overt and covert. Beti's aim always, even in his harsh criticism of Cameroon's independence government, was to strengthen African autonomy and prosperity.

"Sans haine et sans amour" (1953) is a short story and Beti's first significant writing, predating his longer works.

=== Ville cruelle ===
Ville cruelle (1954), like many first novels by African writers, features a young protagonist caught between European and African cultures. Banda, the novel's protagonist, is attempting to marry the woman of his choice; he is able to do so by way of a string of improbable coincidences. The novel is not widely read now; Beti published it under the pseudonym Eza Boto, a nom de plume he did not use later to dissociate himself from the work. Still, the novel received praise from some critics, such as David Diop, who praised its rigorous depiction of the damage wrought by colonialism.

=== Le pauvre Christ de Bomba ===
Le pauvre Christ de Bomba, published in 1956, was Beti's breakthrough success. Written as the journal of a young priest's assistant, the novel tells the story of a missionary in the 1930s. The priest slowly realises the futility and pointlessness of attempting to convert Africans who, as he concludes, already worshipped God in their own way. Gerald Moore notes that in this novel, Beti has learned to use his protagonist's naivete as a tool of satire: the apprentice's simplistic reflections on his experiences with the priest "becomes the pure mirror through which we see the greed, the folly, and the tragic misunderstandings of a whole epoch in Africa's history."

=== Mission terminée ===
Mission terminée, 1957, is a comic novel describing the visit of a young Cameroonian man with a western education to a village in the interior. Jean-Marie Medza, the protagonist, has just failed his Baccalauréat exam. He returns home expecting humiliation. Instead, he is charged with the duty of travelling to Kala, a remote village, to secure the return of a young woman who has fled her abusive, domineering husband. In Kala, Medza falls in with a group of friends his own age. The bulk of the novel depicts a series of farcical misadventures that give Medza a deeper understanding of his own culture and of himself. The English translation is titled Mission to Kala.

The novel was well received, winning the Prix Sainte-Beuve in 1958. Wole Soyinka praised its realism, writing "Idealization is a travesty of literary truth; worse still, it betrays only immature hankerings of the creative impulse." The novel also received somewhat contradictory criticism; Chinua Achebe chided Beti for romanticising the pre-colonial past, while Donatus Nwoga criticised Beti's "cynicism" on the same topic.

=== Le roi miraculé: chronique des Essazam ===
Le roi miraculé: chronique des Essazam (1958) describes the transformation of a fictional African town by capitalism, Christianity, and colonialism. The hero here, Le Guen, had been a minor character in The Poor Christ of Bomba; this novel is set shortly after World War II. Le Guen takes advantage of a seemingly miraculous recovery from death to convince the local Chief of Essazam to embrace Christianity. The Chief does so zealously, but his repudiation of his many wives leads to chaos, as each jockeys for the right to be his one "true" wife. This chaos alarms both the Church and the colonial administration; at the end, Le Guen is transferred, and Essazam returns to its traditional ways.

=== Main basse sur le Cameroun and Les procès du Cameroun ===
Main basse sur le Cameroun and Les procès du Cameroun both date from 1972. These lengthy essays marked Beti's return to public writing. They were inspired by his dissatisfaction with the post-independence governments of Ahmadou Ahidjo; this discontent was sparked by the arrest and ultimate execution of UPC activist Ernest Ouandie and Bishop Albert Ndongmo on charges of conspiring to overthrow the government. The works, which took a firm line against neocolonialism, were prohibited both in Cameroon and in France until Beti's legal challenge proved successful in 1976. Beti revised and reissued them in the early 1980s.

=== Perpétue et l'habitude du malheur ===
Perpétue et l'habitude du malheur, published in 1974, was Beti's first novel since The Miraculous King. It is sometimes considered part of a trilogy that also includes Remember Ruben and Remember Ruben 2; however, both in theme and in treatment it is markedly different. The novel treats the investigation of a man, Essola, into the circumstances of the death of his sister. He finds that his greedy parents had forced her into a loveless and inappropriate marriage; her ill-treatment at the hands of her husband began a chain of events that led to her death. The novel is at once a realistic exposition of postcolonial conditions in the nation and an allegory: Perpetua is developed as a symbol of the nation, and her inappropriate marriage symbolises the squalid and incomplete liberation of the country as a whole.

- Peuples noirs, peuples africains, 1978 – 1991.
- Les langues africaines et le néo-colonialisme en Afrique francophone, 1982.
- Les deux mères de Guillaume Ismaël Dzewatama, futur camionneur, 1983.
- La revanche de Guillaume Ismaël Dzewatama, 1984.
- Lettre ouverte aux Camerounais, or, La deuxième mort de Ruben Um Nyobé, 1986.

Dictionnaire de la négritude

1989; Edited, with Odile Tobner and contributors to the review Peuples noirs – Peuples africains. In this work, Beti set out to clarify (and in large part to reject) the doctrine of négritude. His stated goal was to move the concept from its origins in racial mythology to a site in history. In this new position, he believed, negritude could be employed as a conceptual tool for understanding not only African experience but also the role of colonialism in shaping that experience. Entries cover the experience of Africans both in Africa and worldwide (the first entry is for Ralph Abernathy).

La France contre l'Afrique: retour au Cameroun

1993. This work of journalism chronicles Beti's return to Cameroon in 1991. He treats not only his own experiences, which included long-delayed reunions and police harassment, but also his impressions of what more than two decades of nominal independence and autocratic rule had done to the material and psychological conditions of his countrypeople.

- L'histoire du fou, 1994.
- Trop de soleil tue l'amour, 1999.
- Branle-bas en noir et blanc, 2000.
