= List of Ghanaian poets =

Notable poets from Ghana include:

== A ==
- Kobena Eyi Acquah (b. 1952)
- Apiorkor Seyiram Ashong-Abbey (b. 1988)
- P. A. K. Aboagye (1925–2001)
- Geormbeeyi Adali-Mortty (b. 1916)
- Padmore Enyonam Agbemabiese (b. 1965)
- Ama Ata Aidoo (1940–2023)
- Kofi Anyidoho (b. 1947)
- Raphael Armattoe (1913–1953)
- Kofi Awoonor (1935–2013)

== B ==
- J. Benibengor Blay (b. 1915)
- Kwesi Brew (1928–2007)
- Nana Brew-Hammond (living)
- Abena Busia (b. 1953)
- Akosua Busia (b. 1966)

== C ==
- Gladys Casely-Hayford (1901–1950)
- Chief Moomen (born 1990)

== D ==
- Nana Awere Damoah (b. 1975)
- Lawrence Darmani (b. 1956)
- Kwame Dawes (b. 1962)
- Joe de Graft (1924–1978)
- Michael Dei-Anang (1909–1977)
- Amu Djoleto (b. 1929)
- Cameron Duodu (b. 1937)

== H ==
- Henneh Kyereh Kwaku

== K ==
- Ellis Ayitey Komey (1927–1972)
- Koo Kumi (b. 1994)
- Benjamin Kwakye (b. 1967)

== L ==
- Kojo Laing (1946–2017)

== M ==
- Mr. Poetivist (b. 1998)

== O ==
- Atukwei Okai (1941–2018)

== P ==
- Frank Kobina Parkes (1923–2004)
- Nii Parkes (b. 1974)

== S ==
- Efua Sutherland (1924–1996)
