= Poems of Black Africa =

1975 poetry antholog

Poems of Black Africa is a poetry anthology edited by Wole Soyinka, published in 1975 as part of the Heinemann African Writers Series. It was arranged by theme.

== Introduction ==
Soyinka introduces Poems of Black Africa as being different from other anthologies because it is arranged by themes that go beyond what Soyinka calls the "customary settings" of other ways of organizing such as "regions, period, style, [and] authorship." He states that the purpose of this anthology was to put together poems that envelop the reality and sense of black Africa, both "modern and historic", through poetic expression.

== Critical reception ==
Poems of Black Africa was well received by Ursula A. Barnett, who declared it a successful anthology, although acknowledging that the work focuses on quality rather than comprehensiveness, despite being described as encompassing "most of the experience of the African world". She notes in her review in World Literature Today that many of the poems included were written by African statesmen. According to Barnett the works vary from expressions of passion, pain, beauty, betrayal, nostalgia, revolutionary fervour, death, wit, humour and satire. The works represent traditional writings from a wide array of groups, encompassing the Swahili, Yoruba, Zulu and other sources, and including seven original poems from Soyinka himself.

Michael Kelly of the University of Hull, Northumberside, criticizes the works in Poems of Black Africa for being not poetic in the way they treat themes of race, identity, and suffering, calling the poems "propagandist and rhetorical". In contrast to Barnett's review, Kelly notes a lack of quality writing throughout the selections; he calls the poems difficult to understand and says that they are full of overwriting and lack clarity, placing responsibility for this fault on the anthology and on Soyinka himself as editor. Kelly says that genuine feeling expressed in the poems is not enough to overcome the lack of structure and form. Ending his critique, he states that black poets would have been better served by an anthology that focused on quality rather than themes, calling Poems of Black Africa "provocative and embarrassing".

== Contributing poets ==
Abangira - G. Adali-Mortty - Costa Andrade - Jared Angira - Peter Anyang' Nyong'o - Kofi Awoonor - Kwesi Brew - Dennis Brutus - Siraman Cissoko - J. P. Clark - José Craveirinha - Viriato da Cruz - Bernard Dadié - Kaoberdiano Dambara - Joe de Graft - Solomon Deressa - Noémia de Sousa - Birago Diop - David Diop - Mbella Sonne Dipoko - Marcelino dos Santos - Tsegaye Gabre-Medhin - Armando Guebuza - Ismael Hurreh - Antonio Jacinto - Paulin Joachim - Charles Kabuto Kabuye - W. Kamera - Jonathan Kariara - Amin Kassam - Yusuf O. Kassam - Keorapetse Kgositsile - Kittobbe - Mazisi Kunene - Kojo Gyinaye Kyei - Taban Lo Liyong - Stephen Lubega - Theo Luzuka - Valente Malangatana - Ifeanyi Menkiti - Mindelense - Oswald Mbuyiseni Mtshali - Agostinho Neto - Arthur Nortje - Richard Ntiru - Odia Ofeimun - Atukwei Okai - Gabriel Okara - Christopher Okigbo - Yambo Ouloguem - Frank Kobina Parkes - Okot p'Bitek - Lenrie Peters - Rabérivelo - Isaac Rammopo - Jorge Rebelo - Arnaldo Santos - L. S. Senghor - Onésimo Silveira - Wole Soyinka - J.-B. Tati-Loutard - Bahadur Tejani - B. S. Tibenderana - Enoch Tindimwebwa - Kalu Uka - Tchicaya U Tam'si - Okogbule Wonodi

== Themes ==
- Alien Perspective
- Ancestors and Gods
- Animistic Phases
- Black Thoughts
- Captivity
- Compatriot
- Cosmopolis
- Early Passage
- Ethics, Mores, Abstractions: Man, the Philosopher
- Exile
- Indictment and Summons
- Land and Liberty
- Man in Nature
- Mating Cry
- Mortality
- Poet's Passage
- Praise-Singer and Critic
- Prayers, Invocations
- Miscellany
