= Big Ghun =

Ghanaian film director

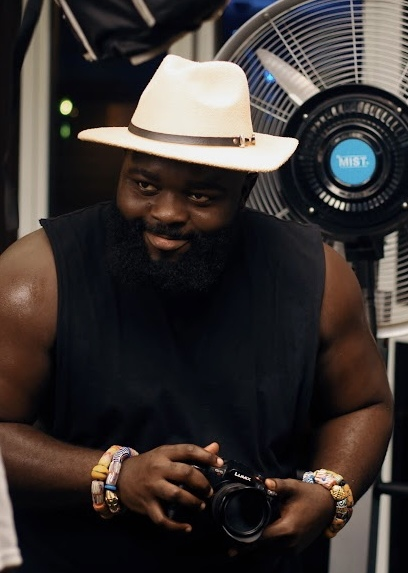
- Born: Koforidua
- Other names: Obolotui
- Education: National Film and Television Institute, Manya Krobo Senior High School, Multichoice Talent Factory, (UPSA)
- Occupations: Film director and producer
- Website: www.bigghun.com

Nicholas Tetteh Nartey also known as Big Ghun is a Ghanaian film director, film producer and a musician, known for directing and winning the Africa Magic Viewers Choice Awards (AMVCA) with the movie Leaked.

== Early life and education ==
He was born in Koforidua in the Eastern Region.For his Senior High Education, he attended Manya Krobo Senior High School. He holds a Bsc. of Fine Arts in Film Directing from the National Film and Television Institute (NAFTI). He also received a master’s degree in Brands and Communications Management from the University of Professional Studies, Accra (UPSA) where he graduated on October 3.

== Career ==
He is a film director, producer and musician. He transitioned into film in 2019 with his maiden short film, Koro (One). Koro is a short film about a couple haunted by their past on their wedding night The short film won the best short thriller at Robinson Film Awards International Film Festival and was acquired by Showmax. Koro was also nominated for The Best Short Film at the 2022 African Magic Viewers Choice Awards.

In 2022, he released his second movie "Leaked", a movie about a young girl battling cyber abuse after her private pictures leaked online. The movie won the Talent Factory Award at 2023 African Magic Viewers Choice Awards.

In 2025, he teamed up with Jeffrey Nortey to release a musical comedy movie which featured Clemento Suarez, Giovanni Caleb, Feli Nuna and Wan-O.

== Filmography ==
=== Directed features ===
- Leaked (2022)
- Koro (2019)
- Vibes, The Movie

== Awards ==
Awards	Year	Movie	Category	Result	Ref
AMVCA	2023	Leaked	The Multichoice Talent Factory	Won	
Robbinson’s Film awards	2021	Koro	Best short film	Won	

== Philanthropy ==
Over the years Big Ghun has embarked on some philanthropical activities through his "Bigg Save Project". The project painted a local school in Odumase to raise the interest of children in art.

In 2021, the project embarked on a "Feed The Streets" campaign to feed female street hawkers in Accra.
