= Voices of Ghana =

Book by Henry Swanzy

Voices of Ghana: Literary Contributions to the Ghana Broadcasting System 1955–57 was "the first Ghanaian literary anthology of poems, stories, plays and essays". Edited by Henry Swanzy and published in 1958 by the Ghanaian Ministry of Information and Broadcasting, Voices of Ghana contained works that had been broadcast on the Ghana radio programmes The Singing Net, Sound Judgement and Akan Theatre (later Ghana Theatre) between 1955 and 1957. The collection opened with an essay, "The Poetry of Drums", by Kwabena Nketia, and the writers anthologised included Frank Parkes, A. W. Kayper-Mensah, Kwesi Brew, Cameron Duodu, Amu Djoleto, Efua T. Sutherland Robert K. Gardiner and Geormbeeyi Adali-Mortty. According to Nigerian writer Cyprian Ekwensi, the anthology was Ghana's declaration of its "literary achievement" and was "bound to lead to intense literary awakening throughout the coast".

== Second edition 2018 ==
To mark the 60th anniversary of the original publication Voices of Ghana was edited by Victoria Ellen Smith and published by James Currey, with a Preface by Mustapha Abdul-Hamid and a foreword by Atukwei Okai.
