= Modern African Stories =

- Author: Ellis Ayitey Komey, Es'kia Mphahlele
- Language: English
- Genre: Short stories
- Publisher: Faber and Faber
- Publication date: 1964
- Pages: 227

Modern African Stories is an anthology of postcolonial African short stories, edited by Ghanaian writer and poet Ellis Ayitey Komey and South African writer, poet, and critic Es'kia Mphahlele. The anthology was published in London by Faber and Faber, in 1964.

The collection contains short stories from West Africa (though as one scholar noted the short story was not yet an accepted form in West Africa) and South Africa, and one from Kenya. Books Abroad listed it as one of their "Outstanding 1964 Books". The introduction, by Komey and Mphahlele, assesses the position of African writers in the postcolonial period; according to William R. Ferris, Komey (in this introduction) argues convincingly that African literature (with the exception of Swahili) is written in response to white writing but that at the same time it can incorporate "traditional lore" successfully, not superficially, as Michael Crowder maintained.

== Contents ==
Note: names are written here as they are listed in the Table of Contents.

- "Cut Me a Drink", Christiana A. Aidoo
- "Ding Dong Bell", Kwabena Annan
- "Death of a Boy", Chinua Achebe
- "Me and the Fish God", Ato Bedwei
- "This is Experience Speaking", Peter Kwame Buahin
- "Mista Courifer", Adelaide Casely-Hayford
- "The Blood in the Washbasin", William Conton
- "Koya", R. Sarif Easmon
- "A Stranger from Lagos", Cyprian Ekwensi
- "Coffee for the Road", Alex La Guma
- "Machado", Alfred Hutchinson
- "A Man Can Try", Eldred Durosimi Jones
- "I Can Face You", Ellis Komey
- "The Second Coming", James Matthews
- "On the Beat--Sketches of South African Life", Casey Motsisi
- "Grieg on a Stolen Piano", Ezekiel Mphahlele
- "A Meeting in the Dark", James Ngugi
- "The Judge's Son", Abioseh Nicol
- "The Gambler", Nkem Nwankwo
- "The Rain Came", Grace A. Ogot
- "The Crooks", Gabriel Okara
- "The Will of Allah", David Owoyele
- "Rain", Richard Rive
- "Feather Woman of the Jungle", Amos Tutuola
- "The Dube Train", Can Themba
