= You Laughed and Laughed and Laughed =

Poem by Nigerian writer Gabriel Okara

"You Laughed and Laughed and Laughed" is a poem by Nigerian writer Gabriel Okara. One of the most popular in his oeuvre, it is a frequent feature of anthologies, such as A New Book of African Verse edited by John Reed and Clive Wake (Heinemann African Writers Series, 1985). "The piece belongs with the best of Senghor's nostalgic verse," wrote Michael J. C. Echeruo in a tribute to Okara on the occasion of his 70th birthday, "with the militancy of many of David Diop's lyrics, and certainly with J. P. Clark's 'Ivbie', another of my favorite African poems. Okara's poem is more relaxed than these, however, more ironic, less tortured. In some ways, of course, it is less urgent, less strident, less involved. If Clark's 'Ivbie' was complex and for good reason, You laughed, and laughed, and laughed seemed also appropriately straightforward: proud without arrogance, hurting without showing it, and blunt without rudeness." The first of Okara's poems that it was Echeruo's pleasure to read, it was also in his opinion the most enduring. The poem is sometimes wrongly attributed to South African writer Dennis Brutus.

== Synopsis ==
Gabriel Okara's poem consists of 10 stanzas and describes the interplay of different interpretations of the same sounds, sights, and dances. The interaction that takes place within the poem is commonly thought to be between a white colonialist and an African native. The poem follows a trope in African literature of "The White Man Laughed", which embodies the notion of dismay and cynical derision of the beliefs, practices, and norms of an African. However, Okara's poem can be seen to transcend the acceptance of the derision of the White Man and present a wiser African intellectual. The poem concludes with the African man teaching the White Man of his ignorance and helping him realize that the native beliefs of the African are not primitive nor removed from intellectual thought.

As summarized by Pushpa Naidu Parekh, "In 'You Laughed and Laughed and Laughed,' the colonizer's mockery and contemptuous disparagement of indigenous African culture and worldview are confronted and ultimately silenced by the warmth of the native's 'fire' laughter."

== Poem ==
You Laughed and Laughed and Laughed

In your ears my song is motor car misfiring stopping with a choking cough; and you laughed and laughed and laughed.

In your eyes my ante- natal walk was inhuman, passing your "omnivorous understanding" and you laughed and laughed and laughed

You laughed at my song, you laughed at my walk.

Then I danced my magic dance to the rhythm of talking drums pleading, but you shut your eyes and laughed and laughed and laughed

And then I opened my mystic inside wide like the sky, instead you entered your car and laughed and laughed and laughed

You laughed at my dance, you laughed at my inside. You laughed and laughed and laughed.

But your laughter was ice-block laughter and it froze your inside froze your voice froze your ears froze your eyes and froze your tongue.

And now it’s my turn to laugh; but my laughter is not ice-block laughter. For I know not cars, know not ice-blocks.

My laughter is the fire of the eye of the sky, the fire of the earth, the fire of the air, the fire of the seas and the rivers fishes animals trees and it thawed your inside, thawed your voice, thawed your ears, thawed your eyes and thawed your tongue.

So a meek wonder held your shadow and you whispered; "Why so?" And I answered: "Because my fathers and I are owned by the living warmth of the earth through our naked feet."

"You Laughed And laughed And Laughed | Gabriel Okara". The African Book Review. 9 May 2014. Archived from the original on 19 October 2016.
