= Atukwei Okai =

Ghanaian poet, cultural activist and academic (1941–2018)

- Born: Atukwei John Okai; 15 March 1941; Accra, Ghana
- Died: 13 July 2018 (aged 77); Accra, Ghana
- Education: Gorky Literary Institute (Moscow); School of Slavonic and East European Studies (London)
- Spouse: Beatrice Okai
- Children: 5 daughters

Atukwei John Okai (15 March 1941 – 13 July 2018) was a Ghanaian poet, cultural activist and academic. He was Secretary-General of the Pan African Writers' Association, and a president of the Ghana Association of Writers. His early work was published under the name John Okai. With his poems rooted in the oral tradition, he is generally acknowledged to have been the first real performance poet to emerge from Africa, and his work has been called "also politically radical and socially conscious, one of his great concerns being Pan-Africanism". His performances on radio and television worldwide include an acclaimed 1975 appearance at Poetry International at Queen Elizabeth Hall in London, where he shared the stage with US poets Stanley Kunitz and Robert Lowell, and Nicolás Guillén of Cuba.

== Early life and education ==
Atukwei Okai was born on 15 March 1941 in Accra, Ghana, and from the age of three for eight years lived in the country's Northern Region, where his father (Ga by birth) was a school headmaster in Gambaga. Okai was educated at the Gambaga Native Authority School, Nalerigu Middle Boys' School, then at Methodist Middle Boys' School in Accra and Accra High School.

== Further education ==
In 1961, he went on a scholarship from the government of President Kwame Nkrumah to Moscow, where he earned his M.A. (Litt.) from the Gorky Literary Institute in 1967. Nkrumah had meanwhile been overthrown in a coup in 1966, and when Okai returned home the following year, he and other Ghanaian students who had studied in the Soviet Union were not welcomed by the new regime and had difficulty finding employment. He recalled: "It was a most despondent time of my life.... I was already a writer and broadcaster of some note before I went to the Soviet Union. It galled greatly that those of us that went to study in the former Eastern Bloc were tarred by the general suspicion attached to socialism in those days. We were not politicians and we did not get our scholarships on our political affiliations. We were young Ghanaians with passion to help build the country." He nevertheless honoured invitations from schools and colleges, such as Wesley Girls' High School, and Adisadel College in Cape Coast, and Achimota School, to give performances of his work, which had a memorable impact on the young students.

Okai subsequently took up a post-graduate scholarship from the University of Ghana to pursue studies in the UK, earning his Master of Philosophy (M.Phil) degree in 1971 from the School of Slavonic and East European Studies in London, which is today part of University College London.

He began teaching at the University of Ghana, Legon, in 1971 as lecturer in Russian literature at the Department of Modern Languages, and in 1984 became Senior Research Fellow in African Literature at the Institute of African Studies. He was also the head of the GaDangbe Department of Education at the University of Education, Winneba, Ghana.

In 1989 he was elected the first Secretary-General of the Pan African Writers' Association (PAWA), a position he held till his death. His pioneering role at PAWA was recognized by the Entertainment Critics and Reviewers Association of Ghana (ECRAG), which in 1991 presented him with their highest award, the Flagstar, the first time that this award was given to a writer.

== Personal life and death ==
Atukwei Okai died aged 77 in Korle-Bu Teaching Hospital, Accra, on 13 July 2018, after a short illness. He was survived by his wife Beatrice and their five daughters.

=== State burial ===
Atukwei Okai’s state-assisted funeral service, attended by many dignitaries including past and present Ghanaian leaders, was on 13 September 2018 at the Accra International Conference Centre and his body was buried at the new Military Cemetery at Burma Camp in Accra.

== Writing ==
When the Ghana Society of Writers (precursor to the current Ghana Association of Writers) was founded in 1957, Okai became its youngest member, aged 16, while he was still at Accra High School. As he would later recollect:

"It was quite an exciting time in my life. Imagine as a young boy being surrounded with so many books, and to be in the company of literary giants like Michael Dei-Anang, J. H. Kwabena Nketia, Efua Sutherland, the late Kofi Awoonor, Crakye Denteh, Kwesi Brew, Geombeeyi Adali-Mortty, Cameron Duodu and many others.... A special mentor was the principal of my Accra High school, William Conton, author of the novel, The African. He introduced me to Mr. Moses Danquah, the Editor of a new magazine that was yet to appear, The Ghanaian Magazine. My poems thus began to appear on its pages.... Another kind mentor was Madam Dorothy Padmore, the wife of Mr. George Padmore, whom I visited in their home. On some evenings, I would sit by her under the skies as she critiqued some of my published poems while her husband, Dr Kwame Nkrumah’s famous friend and colleague, sat by reading foreign newspapers"

After for some years of his poetry being published in newspapers and magazines, as well as read on Henry Swanzy's Ghana Radio programme The Singing Net, Okai's first major collection, The Oath of the Fontonfrom and Other Poems, was published in 1971 by Simon & Schuster in New York. It was followed in 1974 by Logorligi Logarithms, which "juxtaposes the Ga and English words for the same mathematical concept, thus indicating Okai's parallel traditional and modern consciousness as a poet."

His poems have been translated into several languages (including Russian, Spanish, German, Arabic, French, Italian) and have appeared widely in anthologies including The Penguin Book of Modern African Poetry and prominent international journals such as The Atlantic Monthly, New African, Black World, Literary Cavalcade and New American Review.

The musicality of his poetry has been attributed to influences dating back to his early years in the ambience of North Ghana, which is rich in music-dominated idioms, and he has performed his work widely on radio, television and to live audiences. Professor Femi Osofisan of Nigeria has stated that "Okai was the first to try to take African poetry back to one of its primal origins, in percussion, by deliberately violating the syntax and lexicon of English, creating his own rhythms through startling phonetic innovations."

He also wrote three books of "verses and chants" for children.

== Selected bibliography ==
- Flowerfall. London: Writers' Forum. London, 1969
- Oath of the Fontonfrom and Other Poems. New York: Simon & Schuster, 1971
- Lorgorligi: Logarithms and Other Poems. Ghana Publishing Corporation, 1974
- Freedom Symphony: Selected and New Love Poems. Ghana Publishing Company, 2008
- Mandela the Spear and Other Poems. Johannesburg: African Perspectives, 2013; ISBN 9780992187514

=== For children ===
- The Anthill In the Sea: Verses and Chants for Children, illustrated by Fiona Arkorful. Ghana Publishing Corporation, 1988; reprinted 1993.
- A Slim Queen In A Palanquin: Verses and Chants for Children, illustrated by Philip Amonoo, Smartline Publishers, 2010, ISBN 9789988600204
- A Pawpaw On A Mango Tree, illustrated by Philip Amonoo, Smartline Publishers, 2010, ISBN 9988-600-25-9

== Awards and honours ==
In 1968 Atukwei Okai was made a Fellow of the Royal Society of Arts (UK) and in 1979 was awarded an Honorary Fellowship in the International Writing Program of the University of Iowa in the US. In 1981 he was elected to Honorary Membership of the National Syndicate of Spanish Writers and to Associate Membership of the Association of Nigerian Authors (ANA). The Ghana Book Award (1979) was accorded to him "in recognition of his signal contribution to the development of national literature".

Okai's other national and international awards included:

- 1979: Iqbal Centenary Commemorative Gold Medal by the government of Pakistan, "in appreciation of valuable contribution to the Birth Centenary Celebrations Seminar on Allama Dr. Mohammed Iqbal, the national poet of Pakistan"
- 1980: International Lotus Prize (and Gold Medal) by the Afro-Asian Writers' Association
- 1986: C. Marconi Gold Medal by the National Council for Research of Italy
- 1991: ECRAG (Entertainment Critics and Reviewers Association of Ghana) Flagstar award
- 1993: Ushio Publication Culture Award of Japan
- 1998: the University of Ghana Golden Jubilee Distinguished Scholarly Award acknowledged "his outstanding contribution to the development of African poetry"

In June 2007, the national award of Member of the Order of the Volta was conferred on Prof. Atukwei Okai.

In February 2015, he was among distinguished personalities honoured by the Accra Metropolitan Assembly (AMA).

== Selected tributes ==
- David Mungoshi, "Tribute to Ghana’s poet laureate Atukwei Okai",The Herald (Zimbabwe), 31 July 2018.
- Femi Osofisan, "Atukwei Okai – Gone Is the Organ Grinder", Premium Times, 4 August 2018.
- Wale Okediran, "Atukwei Okai: Tribute to a literary generalissimo", The Guardian (Nigeria), 26 August 2018.
- Amarkai Amarteifio, "Prof. Atukwei Okai: A life of rhyme and rhythm", Graphic Online, 15 September 2018.
- Kwesi Quartey, "Professor John Atukwei Okai An Appreciation Of A Pan-African Bard", Modern Ghana, 29 September 2018.
