= The Snowflakes Sail Gently Down =

"The Snowflakes Sail Gently Down" is a poem by Nigerian writer Gabriel Okara. It contemplates its speaker's feelings on having left Africa and its culture. Okara wrote the poem in 1959 after seeing snow for the first time in Evanston, Illinois, while he was studying journalism at Northwestern University and researching at the Atomic Research Station's Public Information Department outside of Chicago.
