= Cameron Duodu =

UK-based Ghanaian novelist and journalist (born 1937)

- Born: Martin Cameron Duodu; 24 May 1937 (age 88); Asiakwa, Gold Coast (Ghana)
- Occupations: Novelist, journalist, editor and broadcaster
- Notable work: The Gab Boys (1967)
- Website: http://cameronduodu.com/

Martin Cameron Duodu (born 24 May 1937) is a United Kingdom-based Ghanaian novelist, journalist, editor and broadcaster. After publishing a novel, The Gab Boys, in 1967, Duodu went on to a career as a journalist and editorialist.

== Biography ==
=== Education ===
Duodu was born in Asiakwa in eastern Ghana and educated at Kyebi Government Senior School and the Rapid Results College, London, through which he took his O-Level and A-Level examinations by correspondence course. He began writing while still at school, the first story he ever wrote ("Tough Guy In Town") being broadcast on the radio programme The Singing Net and subsequently included in Voices of Ghana, a 1958 anthology edited by Henry Swanzy that was "the first Ghanaian literary anthology of poems, stories, plays and essays".

=== Early career ===
Duodu was a student teacher in 1954, and worked on a general magazine called New Nation in Ghana, before going on to become a radio journalist for the Ghana Broadcasting Corporation from 1956 to 1960, becoming editor of radio news (moonlighting by contributing short stories and poetry to The Singing Net and plays to the programme Ghana Theatre). From 1960 to 1965 he was editor of the Ghana edition of the South African magazine Drum, and in 1970 edited the Daily Graphic, the biggest-selling newspaper in Ghana.

=== The Gab Boys (1967) and creative writing ===
In 1967, Duodu's novel The Gab Boys was published in London by André Deutsch. The "gab boys" of the title – so called because of their gabardine trousers – are the sharply dressed youths who hang about the village and are considered delinquent by their elders. The novel is the story of the adventures of one of them, who runs away from village life, eventually finding a new life in the Ghana capital of Accra. According to one recent critic, "Duodu simultaneously represents two currents in West African literature of the time, on the one hand the exploration of cultural conflict and political corruption in post-colonial African society associated with novelists and playwrights such as Chinua Achebe and Ama Ata Aidoo, and on the other hand the optimistic affirmation of African cultural strengths found in poets of the time such as David Diop and Frank Kobina Parkes. These themes come together in a very compassionate discussion of the way that individual people, rich and poor, are pushed to compromise themselves as they try to navigate a near-chaotic transitional society."

In June 2010 Duodu was a participant in the symposium Empire and Me: Personal Recollections of Imperialism in Reality and Imagination, held at Cumberland Lodge, alongside other speakers who included Diran Adebayo, Jake Arnott, Margaret Busby, Meira Chand, Michelle de Kretser, Nuruddin Farah, Jack Mapanje, Susheila Nasta, Jacob Ross, Marina Warner, and others.

Duodu also writes plays and poetry. His work was included in the anthology Messages: Poems from Ghana (Heinemann Educational Books, 1970).

=== Other activities and journalism ===
Having worked as a correspondent for various publications in the decades since the 1960s, including The Observer, The Financial Times, The Sunday Times, United Press International, Reuters, De Volkskrant (Amsterdam), and The Economist, Duodu has been based in Britain as a freelance journalist since the 1980s. He has had stints with the magazines South and Index on Censorship, and has written regularly for outlets such as The Independent and The Guardian.

He is the author of the blog "Under the Neem Tree" in New African magazine (London), and has also published regular columns in The Mail and Guardian (Johannesburg) and City Press (Johannesburg), as well as writing a weekly column for the Ghanaian Times (Accra) for many years.

Duodu has appeared frequently as a contributor on BBC World TV and BBC World Service radio news programmes discussing African politics, economy and culture.

He contributed to the 2014 volume Essays in Honour of Wole Soyinka at 80, edited by Ivor Agyeman-Duah and Ogochukwu Promise.

== Personal life ==
In the 1960s Duodu married the dancer and choreographer Beryl Karikari, great-great granddaughter of the king of the Asantes Kofi Karikari ("whose golden death mask, pillaged from the royal mausoleum in Kumase by a British 'expedition' in the 1880s, can be found at the Wallace Collection in London"). Beryl died aged 71 on 9 February 2007, survived by her two sons with Duodu, Akwasi and Korieh, and by her husband's two other sons, Yaw and Kofi. Akwasi Duodu, is financial planner currently living In London, whilst his brother Korieh Duodu is a writer.

== Recognition ==
In 2005 at the Ghana Professional Achievers Awards (GPA), which honour outstanding Ghanaian professionals and business people living in the UK, Duodu won the "Communication and Media" category for his column in New African.

Described by Michael Eli Dokosi of Face2Face Africa as "one of Ghana's best exports" and as "the most sought-after Ghanaian journalist across the globe", Duodu in 2018 was listed by African Voice newspaper among "61 Influential Ghanaians in the Diaspora".
