= Odia Ofeimun =

Nigerian poet (born 1950)

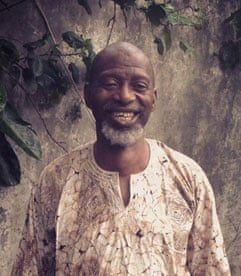
- Ofeimun in 2012
- Born: 16 March 1950 (age 76); Iruekpen-Ekpoma, Edo State, Nigeria
- Education: Oxford University
- Occupations: Poet and polemicist

Odia Ofeimun (born 16 March 1950) is a Nigerian poet and polemicist, the author of many volumes of poetry, books of political essays and on cultural politics, and the editor of two significant anthologies of Nigerian poetry. His work has been widely anthologized and translated and he has read and performed his poetry internationally.

== Biography ==
Odia Ofeimun was born in Iruekpen-Ekpoma, Edo State, Nigeria, in 1950. He worked as a news reporter, factory labourer and civil servant before studying Political Science at the University of Ibadan, where his poetry won first prize in the University Competition of 1975. That year his work appeared in the 1975 anthology Poems of Black Africa, edited by Wole Soyinka.

Ofeimun also worked as an administrative officer in the Federal Public Service Commission, as a teacher, as private (political) secretary to Chief Obafemi Awolowo, leader of the Unity Party of Nigeria, and as a member of the editorial board of The Guardian Newspapers in Lagos. Ofeimun studied at Oxford University on a Commonwealth fellowship. Returning to Nigeria at the annulment of the 1993 election, he wrote columns for The Guardian On Sunday, the Nigerian Tribune, as well as contributing to many other newspapers. He was chairman of the editorial board of the defunct daily, A.M. News, as well as The News and Tempo magazines.

Ofeimun was publicity secretary (1982–84), general secretary (1984–88) and president (1993–97) of the Association of Nigerian Authors. He was also designated advisor to PEN Nigeria Centre and is a founding member of the Pan African Writers' Association.

Ofeimun is the author of more than 40 works. His published collections of poetry include The Poet Lied (1980), A Handle for The Flutist (1986), Dreams At Work and London Letter and Other Poems (2000). His poems for dance drama, Under African Skies (1990) and Siye Goli - A Feast of Return (1992), were commissioned and performed across the UK and Western Europe by Adzido Pan-African Dance Ensemble in the early 1990s, and his most recent poem for dance drama, Nigeria The Beautiful, has been staged through major Nigerian cities to wide acclaim.

== Awards ==
In 2010, Ofeimun received the Fonlon-Nichols Award for literary excellence and propagation of Human Rights, which was conferred on him by the African Literature Association.

== Selected bibliography ==
=== Poetry ===
- The Poet Lied (1980)
- A Handle for The Flutist (1986)
- Under African Skies (Lagos: Hornbill House, 1990; ISBN 978-0951677407)
- London Letter and Other Poems (Lagos: Hornbill House, 2000; ISBN 978-9783527041)
- Dreams At Work and Other Poems (Lagos: Hornbill House, 2000; ISBN 978-9783527003)
- A Feast of Return (Lagos: Hornbill House, 2000)
- Go Tell the Generals (2010)
- A Boiling Caracas and Other Poems (2008)
- I Will Ask Questions With Stones If They Take My Voice (2008)
- Nigeria The Beautiful: Poems for Dance Drama (2011)

=== Anthologies ===
- Lagos of the Poets
- Salute to the Master Builder

=== Cultural politics ===
- A House of Many Mansions (Lagos: Hornbill House, 2012: ISBN 978-978-49005-8-4)
- Impossible Dream of the African Author
- Media Nigeriana
- In Search of Ogun: Soyinka In Spite of Nietzsche (Lagos: Hornbill House, 2014; ISBN 978-978-49005-9-1)

=== Politics ===
- Taking Nigeria Seriously
- June Twelvers' Dilemma
- When Does a Civil War Come To an End?
- This Conference Must Be Different
