= Koo Kumi =

Spoken word artist (b. 1994)

William Du Bois Yaw Sakyi Kumi
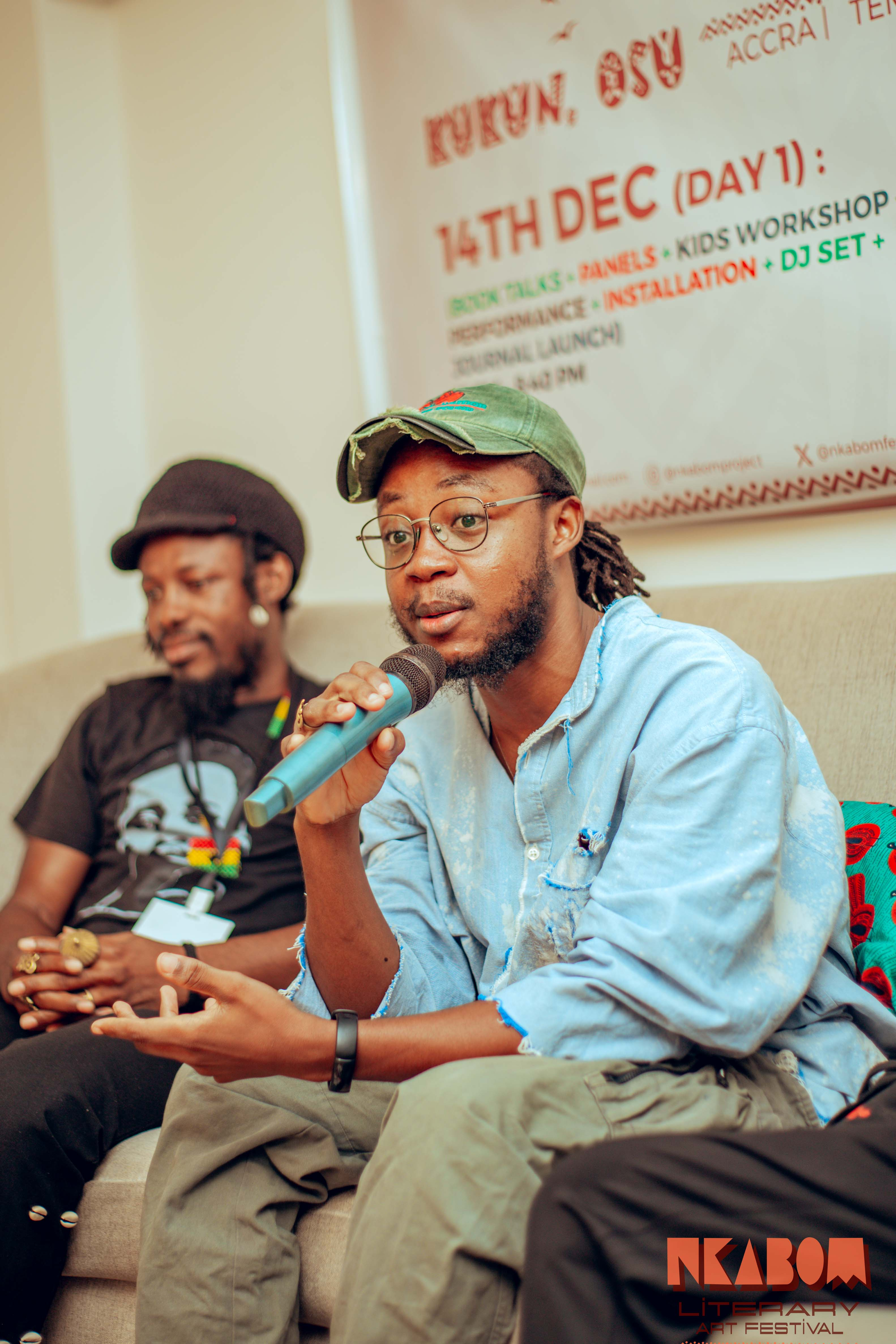
- Born: 5 May 1994 (age 32)
- Citizenship: Ghanaian
- Website: www.kookumi.com

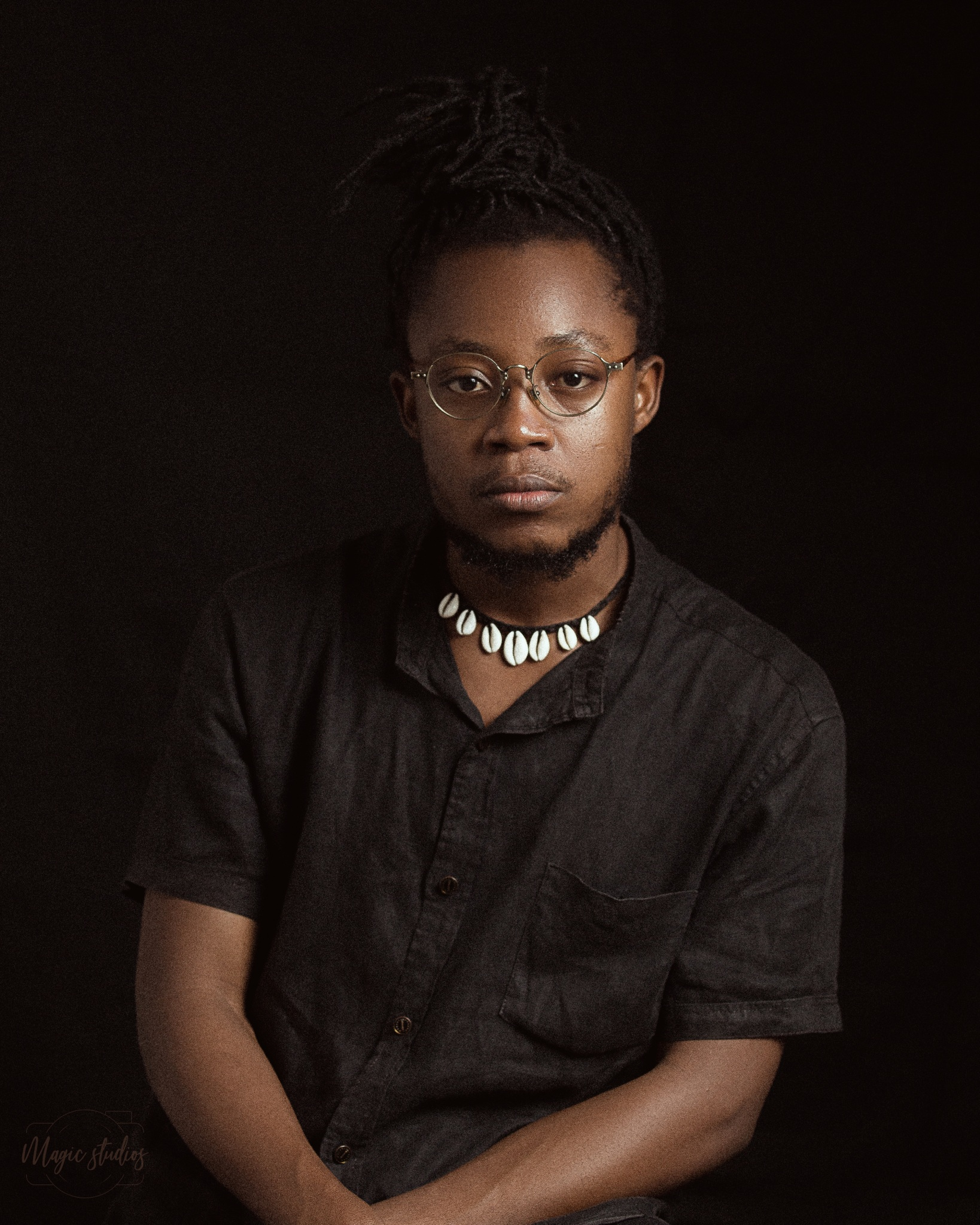
Portrait of Koo Kumi 2020

William Du Bois Yaw Sakyi Kumi (born 5 May 1994), popularly known as Koo Kumi, is a Ghanaian traditional leader, spoken word artist, photographer, slam poet, and mixed media visual artist. He is known for his blend of Twi and English languages. He adopts a traditional sound as well as an alternative hip hop feel. He appeared on the literary scene in 2012. William Du Bois Kumi, also known as Nana Yaw Sakyi I, is the current Apesemakahene of Abotakyi in the Akuapem Traditional Area.

== Early life ==
His father is Kumi Jonathan and his mother was Comfort Kumi, Koo Kumi is the first of four children. He is a native of Mampong Akuapem in the Eastern Region of Ghana. He attended high school at St Paul's Senior High School, Kwahu and later moved to Mampong Presbyterian Senior High School. He studied visual arts in high school.

He majored in journalism at the Ghana Institute of Journalism (GIJ) and earned a Bachelor of Arts in communication in 2018. He is holds an Masters degree in Brands and Communication Management from the University of Professional Studies, Accra (UPSA, Accra.

== Works ==
Koo Kumi is the brain behind "Trotro Vibes". Trotro Vibes is a movement of artists who use public transport as a stage to start conversations with poetry, spoken word and acoustic music. He has performed on several stages, including TV and Radio as well as various live performances at places such as, The National Theatre (Ghana), Alliance Francaise (Accra, Ghana), British Council. He has worked with poets and musicians in Ghana and other countries such as Okyeame Kwame, Kwame Write, Wanlov the Kubolor, Ko-Jo Cue, Chief Moomen among others. Koo Kumi published an anthology "Beautiful Africa" with other young poets in 2013.

=== Spoken word poetry ===
Recorded Poems
No.	Title	Year
1	Tribute to Awoonor	2013
2	Free Us	2013
3	Slow Down	2016
4	Untitled Ones	2016
5	Dear Future Wife	2016
6	My Son	2017
7	The Greatest Poem Ever	2018
8	Ankonam	2020
9	The Griot	2020

==== Albums and extended playlists(EPs) ====
His first body of work of poetry titled "Woke On The Mountain" was released on 12 April 2019, officially.In 2020, he released his second EP "An Ode To A New Moon" made up of three poems to celebrate his birthday. He has also released a 10-track album titled 'The Griot' that tackles politics, urbanization and movement, culture, age of youth, and gender-related issues.

== Appearances ==
Koo Kumi twice appeared on BBC Africa's news. He appeared on it with Trotro Vibes in December 2016 and was featured on BBC through a mini documentary.

== Awards ==
He won the first teen slam in Ghana "Slam Ghana", 2013.

He was nominated for "Poet of The Year" for Ghana Tertiary Awards 2017.

He won "Poet Of The Year" at the Eminence Awards in GIJ.

Koo Kumi was given an honorary award at the 2019 Ghana Institute of Journalism Eminence Award as an "Eminent Alumnus under the age of 60"

He won the 2nd Runner up at the 2019 Ghana Association of writers Awards (3rd Prize for the Kofi Anyidoho Award)
