= Piano and Drums =

"Piano and Drums" is a postcolonial poem by Nigerian poet Gabriel Okara.
