= Frank Kobina Parkes =

- Born: Francis Ernest Kobina Parkes; 8 March 1932; Korle Bu, Ghana
- Died: 23 May 2004 (aged 72); Korle Bu, Accra, Ghana
- Occupation: Writer
- Writing career
- Period: 1960–2004
- Genre: Poetry
- Notable work: "African Heaven"
- Literary movement: Negritude

Frank Kobina Parkes (8 March 1932 – 23 May 2004) was a Ghanaian journalist, broadcaster and poet. He was the author of one book, Songs from the Wilderness (University of London Press, 1965), but is widely anthologised and is perhaps best known for his poem "African Heaven", which echoes the title of Carl Van Vechten's controversial 1926 novel Nigger Heaven, and was selected by Langston Hughes for inclusion in the groundbreaking anthology of African writing An African Treasury (1960). Parkes' poetic style, an intelligent, rhythmic free verse brimming with confidence and undercut with humour, is believed to owe much to the Senegalese poet David Diop, one of the pioneers of the négritude movement. Reviewing Songs from the Wilderness, Mbella Sonne Dipoko said: "Mr Parkes is one of the fine poets writing today about Africa and the world." The book was hailed as "...a landmark not only in Ghanaian poetry but in African poetry as a whole".

== Biography ==
Francis Ernest Kobina Parkes was born in 1932 at Korle-Bu, Gold Coast (now Ghana), to a wealthy pharmacist, a settler from Sierra Leone, and an indigene from the Central Region of Ghana. He was educated in Accra and Cape Coast (where he attended Adisadel College) in Ghana, and Freetown, Sierra Leone, and worked briefly as a newspaper reporter and editor before joining the staff of Radio Ghana in 1955 as a broadcaster. A precociously intelligent young man, he continued to pursue his interest in literature and storytelling, occasionally contributing to the BBC's African Writers' Club radio show and even dabbling as an actor in London, appearing in a stage version of Waiting for Wanda in the early 1960s before it was produced for TV by the BBC.

Parkes also worked as a speech writer for Kwame Nkrumah, Ghana's first president, and later worked at NAFTI (Ghana's Film and Television Institute). Parkes was later president of the Ghana Society of Writers and in the 1970s he worked for the Ghanaian Ministry of Information in Accra. In 1967 he wrote and presented the BBC radio portrait of the American poet Langston Hughes, who had been instrumental in Parkes' rise to recognition outside of Ghana. Parkes worked in film for much of his later life. He died in Accra in May 2004.

=== Family ===
Frank Kobina Parkes was part of – and possibly the pioneer of – a Ghanaian artistic dynasty: the well-known Ghanaian broadcaster and novelist Cameron Duodu was his brother-in-law, and his younger brother Jerry Parkes (also a broadcaster as well as a scientist) was the father of contemporary Ghanaian writer, social commentator and scientist Nii Ayikwei Parkes. Another nephew, Sam Yarney, is the author of a series of Christian thriller novels, and one of Parkes' sons, also named Frank, is a gospel musician.

== Bibliography ==
- An African Treasury (anthology, ed. Langston Hughes) (1960)
- Songs from the Wilderness (1965)
- Poems of Black Africa (anthology, ed. Wole Soyinka) (1975)
- Voices of Ghana: literary contributions to the Ghana Broadcasting System 1955-57 (anthology, ed. Henry Swanzy) (1958), 2nd edition ed. by Victoria Ellen Smith, 2018
