= Wan-O =

Ghanaian Rapper

- Birth name: William Ansah
- Born: October 31, 1985 (age 39)
- Origin: Ghana
- Genres: Hip hop
- Occupation(s): Rapper, musician, journalist
- Years active: 2014–present (professionally)

William Ansah known professionally as Wan-O is a Ghanaian rapper and musician. He is known for selling 1,000,000 physical copies of his music album, "Road to Greatness".

== Early life ==
He was born on 31 October 1985 and has a degree in Human Resource Management.

== Career ==
Even though his music journey started at the age of 6, it wasn't until 2014 that he began music professionally. He released his first major single "Gbelemor" with an accompanying music video.

In 2019, he teamed up with Feli Nuna, for the release of his breakthrough single, "No Size". Later that year, he featured DopeNation on the single "Boozen".

He released his second album "Made in Abelemkpe" in 2021, with S3fa and Goodgirl LA featuring on different singles in the album. The album also featured songs such as lead single, Abelemkpe with Joe Vibe and Dey My Mind.

== Recognition ==
In 2016, he was nominated alongside Ebony Reigns, Feli Nuna, Nii Funny and the eventual winner Adomaa for the Unsung Category at the Vodafone Ghana Music Awards.
