= Pulchérie Abeme Nkoghe =

Gabonese poet (born 1980)

- Born: December 11, 1980; Oyem, Gabon
- Education: Ecole Nationale Supérieure de Secrétariat, Libreville
- Occupations: Poet, children's writer
- Writing career
- Language: French
- Notable work: La vie est un bouquet de fleurs
- Notable awards: Prix David Diop (2020)

Pulchérie Abeme Nkoghe (born 11 December 1980) is a Gabonese poet and children's writer, and president of the Union des Ecrivains Gabonais.

Abeme Nkoghe was born in 1980 in Oyem and attended school in Port-Gentil. She has a degree in business from the Ecole Nationale Supérieure de Secrétariat in Libreville.

Her first published book of poetry was La vie est unbouquet de fleurs (Life is a bunch of flowers), published in 2006. She started to write children's books because she saw the need to encourage Gabonese children's reading and imagination by giving them books in which they could recognise characters like themselves.

She is president of "Jardin du Village", an organisation which aims to empower rural communities in Gabon by encouraging the development of market gardening and animal husbandry.

In 2020, she won the Prix David Diop.

== Selected works ==
- Abeme Nkoghe, Pulchérie (2006). La Vie est un bouquet de fleurs. Paris: Publibook. ISBN 9782748330526.
- Abeme Nkoghe, Pulchérie (2007). Le chant des blessures : poésie. Paris: Acoria. ISBN 9782355720017.
- Abeme Nkoghe, Pulchérie (2013). Chambre 117. Saint-Denis: Édilivre. ISBN 9782332548627.
- Abeme Nkoghe, Pulchérie (2017). Un serpent dans ma cuisine : nouvelles. Libreville: Les Éditions Ntsame. ISBN 9782362131462.
- Abeme Nkoghe, Pulchérie (2018). Le cadeau magique. Libreville: les Éditions Ntsame. ISBN 9782362131448.
- Abeme Nkoghe, Pulchérie (2018). Où est passée Cocotte Eyang ?. Libreville: les Éditions Ntsame. ISBN 9782362131493.
- Abeme Nkoghe, Pulchérie (2020). Croissant de soleil. Ntsame editions. ISBN 9782917414200.
