= The Voice (novel) =

1964 novel by Gabriel Okara

- Author: Gabriel Okara
- Language: English
- Series: African Writers Series
- Genre: Fiction
- Publisher: Africana Publisher
- Publication date: 1964
- Publication place: Nigeria
- Media type: Print
- Pages: 127
- ISBN: 0-8419-0015-9
- OCLC: 1162390

The Voice is a 1964 novel by Nigerian author Gabriel Okara which was published as part of the African Writers Series.

== Plot ==
The novel is set in the 1960s, in post-independence Igboland in Nigeria. After studying, Okolo returns home to seek the truth. The Chiefs exile him for fear that he might topple them.

== Style ==
An editor at Encyclopædia Britannica noted that "Okara translated directly from the Ijo (Ijaw) language, imposing Ijo syntax onto English in 'order to give literal expression to African ideas and imagery. The novel creates a symbolic landscape in which the forces of traditional African culture and Western materialism contend... Okara's skilled portrayal of the inner tensions of his hero distinguished him from many other Nigerian novelists.". Okara's style exhibits the true nature of the power hungry individual.

== Reception ==
Thomas Hinde, writing for The Times Literary Supplement, stated that The Voice is a "morality tale rather than a novel" and that "its characters have the flatness of symbols".
