= A. W. Kayper-Mensah =

Ghanaian poet and diplomat (1923–1980)

- Born: 1923; Sekondi, Ghana
- Died: 1980 (aged 56–57); Bonn, Germany
- Education: Queens' College, Cambridge
- Occupations: Poet, broadcaster and diplomat
- Notable work: The Dark Wanderer (1970); The Drummer in our Time (1975)
- Spouse: Gertrud Agnes-Christina Kayper-Mensah (née König)

Albert William Kayper-Mensah (1923–1980) was a Ghanaian poet, broadcaster and diplomat. He published several collections of poetry in English and German, and was included in various anthologies of African poetry.

== Life ==
Albert Kayper-Mensah was born in Sekondi, Ghana in 1923, the oldest of three siblings. He was educated at Mfantsipim School and Achimota College before going to Queens' College, Cambridge in 1946 and then the University of London.

On returning to Ghana, Kayper-Mensah taught at Wesley College in Kumasi, where he remained for seven years. By the late 1950s, he was performing poetry and plays on Ghanaian radio, and also appearing on the BBC's The Brains Trust in February 1959. He performed at the Mermaid Theatre in London in July 1961. Later, he hosted 'Face to Face' on the Ghana Broadcasting Corporation.

He went on to join Ghana's diplomatic service, serving overseas for 15 years, including periods in Bonn and London. It was while in diplomatic service that many of Kayper-Mensah's poems were published

Albert Kayper-Mensah's death was reported on 9 February 1980. At the time, he was serving in Germany as Principal Secretary in the Ministry of Foreign Affairs. Later that month, the Ghana Association of Writers held a memorial literary evening. He was survived by his wife, Gertrude.

== Work ==
Many of Kayper-Mensah's early poems appeared first in Ghanaian journals, before being included in anthologies. These included two editions of the Heinemann African Writers Series: A Book of African Verse (AWS 8, 1964) and Messages: Poems from Ghana (AWS 42, 1970). The latter was edited by Kofi Awoonor and Geormbeeyi Adali-Mortty.

His first collection of poetry, The Dark Wanderer, was published in Germany and won the Margaret Wrong Literary Prize in 1970.

His second collection, The Drummer in Our Times, appeared in 1975 as number 157 in the African Writers Series. Reviewing the collection the following year, Richard Bauerle described it as 'the work of a mature poet of cosmopolitan background'.

In 1976, Kayper-Mensah published Sankofa: Adinkra Poems, a collection of poems in short abstract verses that explain the meaning of different Adinkra symbols.

== Bibliography ==
Kayper-Mensah, A. W. (1958). Shapes (From The Picasso Mystery). Présence Africaine 20: 61.

Kayper-Mensah, A.W. (1964) 'The Ghosts', in Reed, J. and C. Wake (eds.) A Book of African Verse. London: Heinemann.

Kayper-Mensah, A.W. (1970) The Dark Wanderer. Tübingen: Erdmann

Awoonor, Kofi and Adali-Mortty, G. (1970) Messages: Poems from Ghana. London: Heinemann.

Kayper-Mensah, A.W. and Horst Wolff (eds) (1972) Ghanaian Writing: Ghana as seen by her own writers as well as German authors. Tübingen: Erdmann.

Kayper-Mensah, A.W. (1973) Die sprechende Trommel: Gedichte von Kayper-Mensah. Dortmund: Wulff

Kayper-Mensah, A.W. (1975) The Drummer in our Time. Heinemann.

Kayper-Mensah, A.W. (1976) Sankofa: Adinkra Poems. Tema: Ghana Publishing Corporation.

Kayper-Mensah, A.W. (1976) Akwaaba. Tema: Ghana Publishing Corporation.

Kayper-Mensah, A.W. (1978) Proverb Poems. Tema: Ghana Publishing Corporation.

Kayper-Mensah, A. W. (1978) 'A Second Birthday', in Basil Davidson (ed.) Let Freedom Come, Africa in Modern History. Little, Brown and Company.

Moore, Gerald and Beier, Ulli (eds) (1984) The Penguin book of modern African poetry. Harmondsworth: Pengui

Smith, Victoria Ellen (ed.), Voices of Ghana: Literary Contributions to the Ghana Broadcasting System, 1955–57, 2nd Edition, Woodbridge, Suffolk: James Currey, 2018
