= Willis E. Bell =

Willis E. Bell (1924–1999) was an American photographer best known for documenting Ghana's social and political landscape post-independence between 1957 and 1978. His over 40, 000 images covered political leaders, cultural events, industrialization, and everyday life. His work is a visual record of Ghana’s transformation in the mid-20th century and is considered as a resource for historical and cultural research.

Bell settled in Ghana in 1958 and remained there until his death in 1999. An expatriate photographer, he came to Ghana after having worked for Drum magazine in South Africa, specifically to document the nation's nascent democracy. He quickly integrated himself within multiple Ghanaian communities, from renowned artists' circles to high-level government officials, and everyday citizens.

== Early life ==
Bell was born on October 2, 1924 in Rangoon, Burma to American missionary parents. He was educated at Woodstock School in Mussoorie, India, said to be the first international boarding school in Asia, where he developed an interest in photography. Bell's regular international travels took him to South Africa where Jim Bailey, publisher of the renowned Drum Magazine, encouraged him to visit Ghana, the first country in Africa to gain independence. He established himself in Ghana in the 1950s where he travelled through the West African country in 1958 in what has been described as "memorable" with Henry Ofori, then Accra editor of the magazine. That trip is said to have been a huge factor in Bell deciding to settle in Ghana in 1958.

== Career ==
Bell’s photographic work covers a wide range of subjects, including political leaders, industrial development, architecture, social life, government, politics, agriculture, children, and the daily lives of ordinary Ghanaians. His work provides an expansive visual record of Ghana’s transition post independence and modernization that followed.

Bell's photography has been the subject of scholarly analysis. In 2012, Korklu A. Laryea published an article interpreting selected photographs from the Willis Eugene Bell photo archive, focusing on traditional economic activities in Ghana.

He contributed photographs to several books, often in collaboration with Ghanaian writer Efua Sutherland. Two notable publications are Playtime in Africa (1960, first published in Ghana; later editions in the U.S.) and The Roadmakers: A Picture Book of Ghana (1961), both of which combine Bell’s photography with commentary or design by local authors and institutions.

== Archive and Preservation ==
Bell’s photographic archive, consisting of over 40,000 black and white photographs, documents Ghana during a critical period of its history. The archive is currently preserved by the Mmofra Foundation in Accra, Ghana, with support from institutions such as the Modern Endangered Archives Program at UCLA and Michigan State University’s MATRIX center. The digitization and accessibility efforts aim to ensure Bell’s significant visual record remains a vital resource for researchers exploring African history, global photographic practices, and cultural heritage.

In 2009, an exhibition titled Ghana through the lens: a photo journey by Willis Bell was held at the Nubuke Foundation, Accra.

== Gallery ==
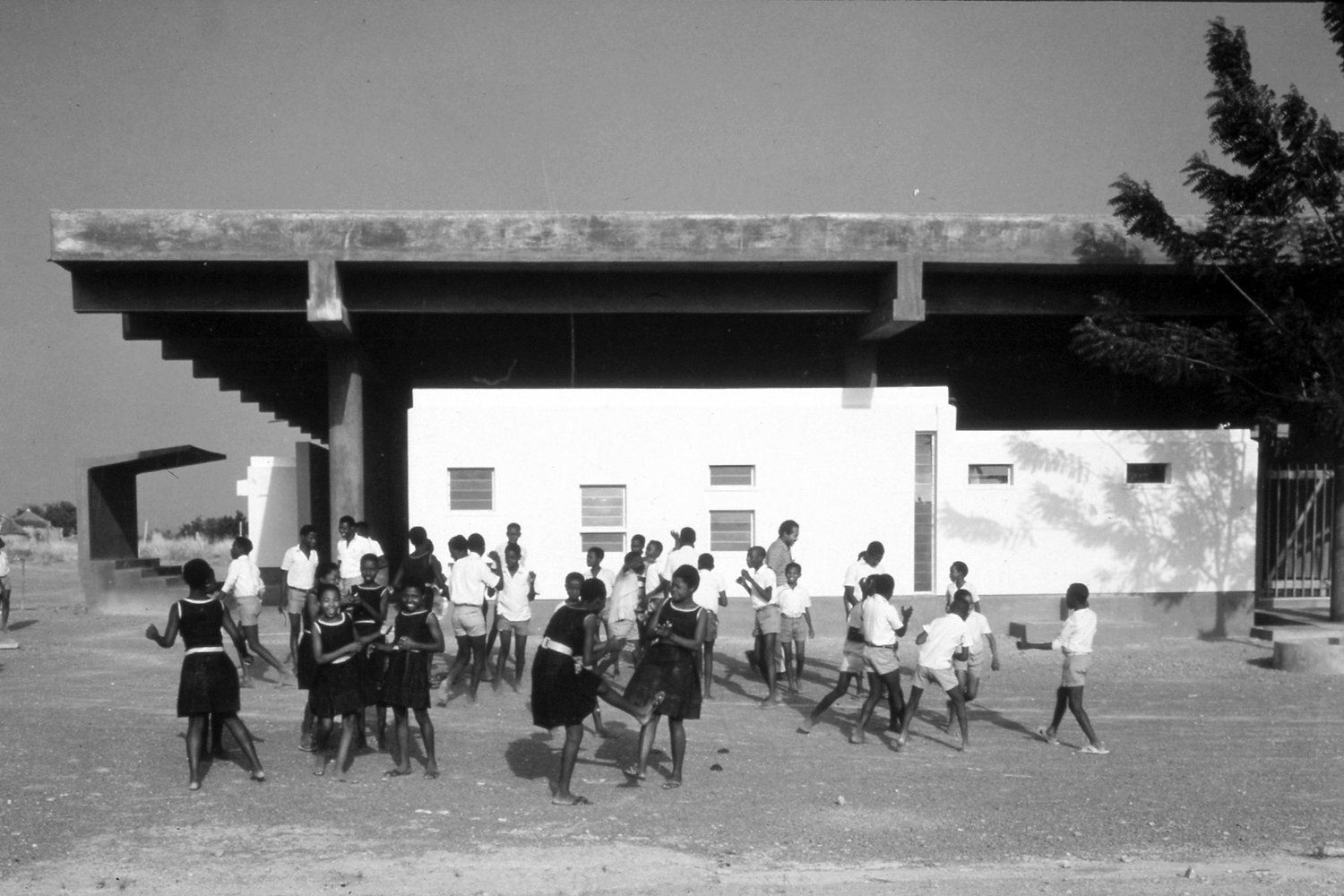
Students playing in front of the Bolgatanga Library

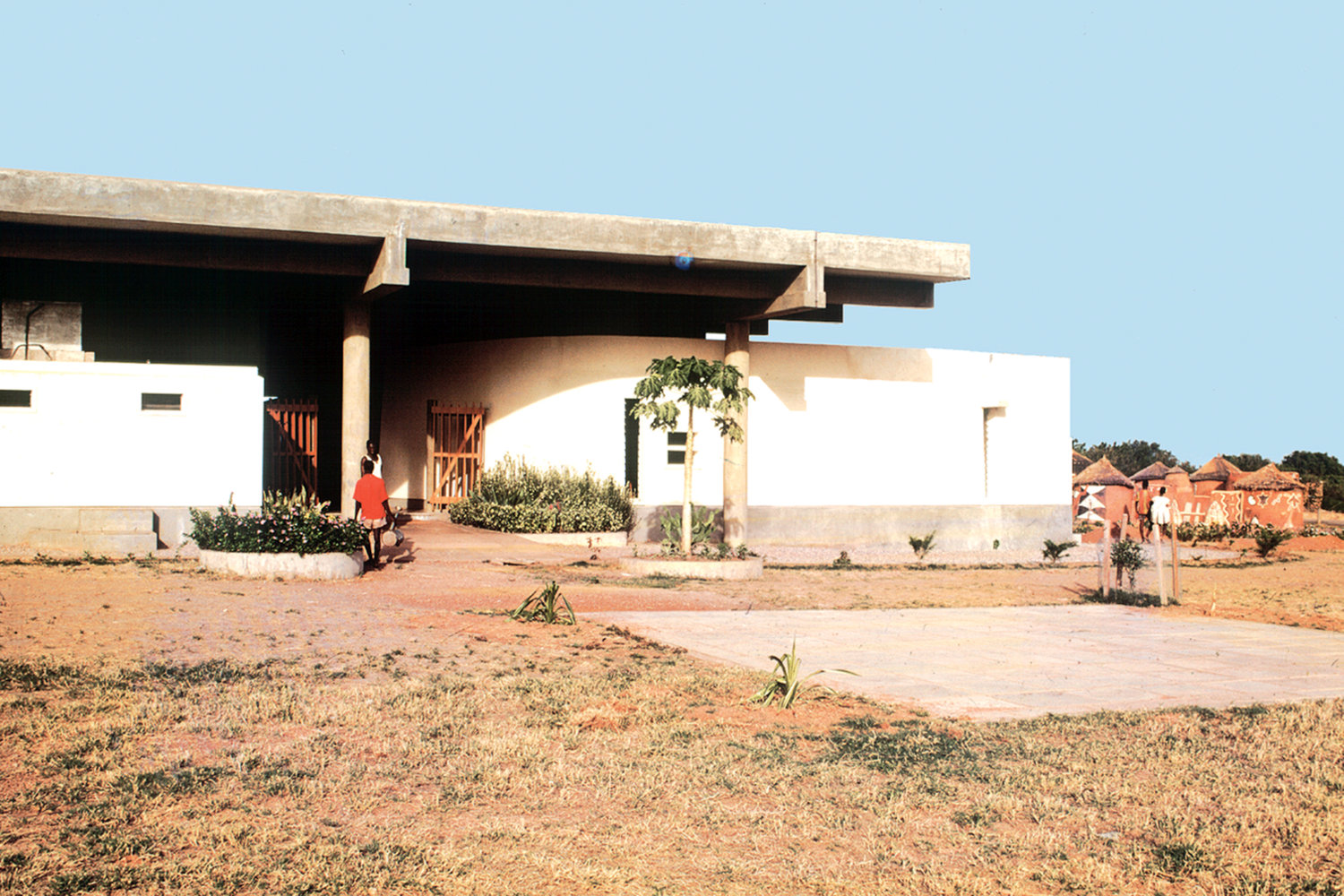
Bolgatanga Library
