= The Renegade (poem) =

"The Renegade" is a poem by David Diop which blackguards those Africans who have espoused European customs at the expense of their African roots. Critics have noted, sometimes pointedly, that Diop himself spent most of his life outside Africa. The point of view is first person singular and the persona uses apostrophe to address the alienated African. Other poetic devices include imagery and irony. This poem can be compared with Letter to My Friend by O.C Macgoye.
