= Chief Moomen =

Ghanaian writer

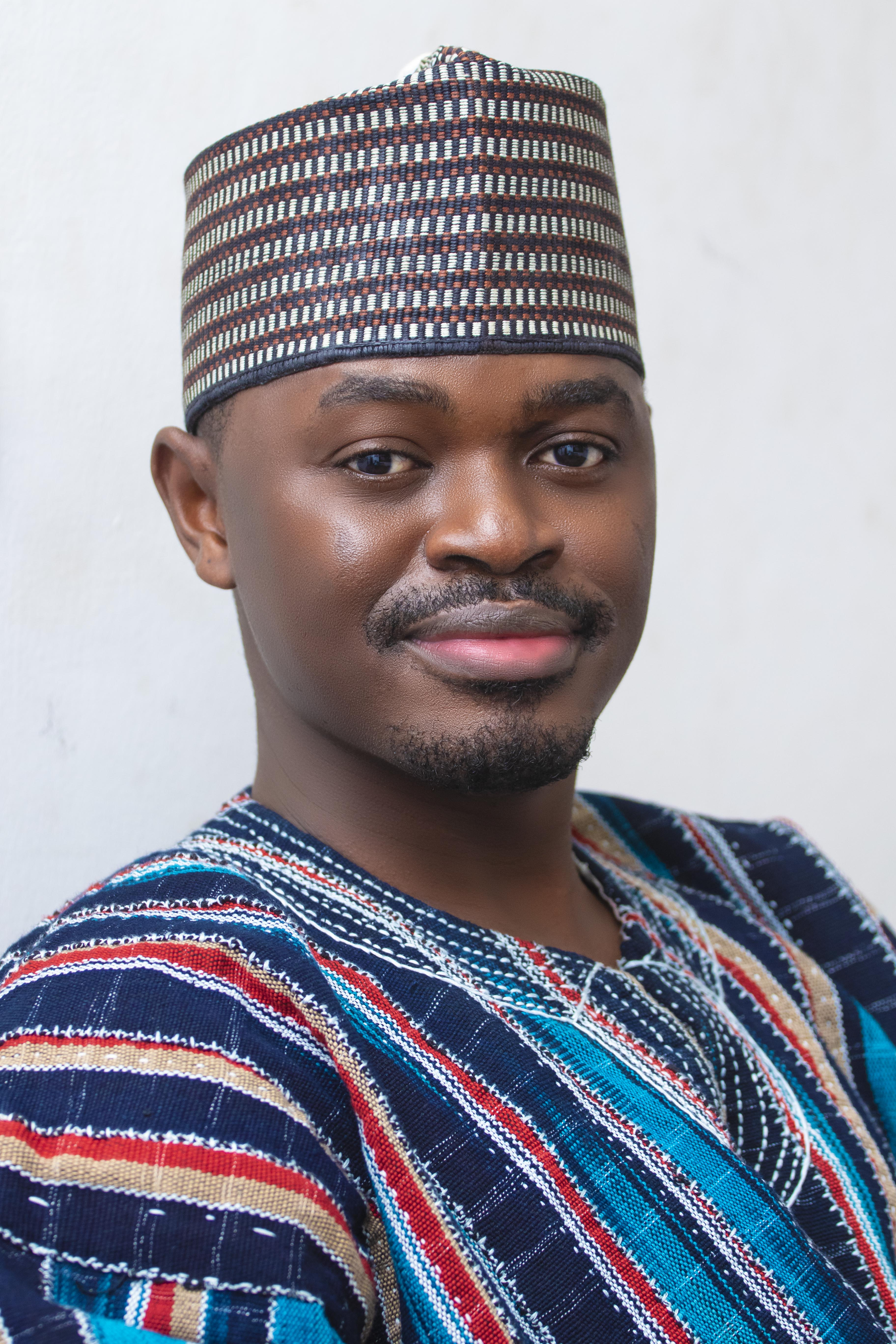
- Chief Moomen in 2020
- Born: Abdul Moomen Muslim; 16 December 1990 (age 35); Accra Ghana
- Occupations: Poet, Playwright, Creative entrepreneur

Abdul Moomen Muslim (born 16 December 1990) known professionally as Chief Moomen is a Ghanaian poet, playwright and creative entrepreneur. He is best known for creating the Ghanaian historical epic - WogbeJeke: Our Journey, a theatrical reenactment of the history of Ghana from ancient to modern times, directed by Joyce Anima Misa Amoah. In March 2017, the play was chosen as the official theatre showpiece to celebrate Ghana’s 60th Anniversary.

== Early life and education ==
Moomen hails from the Upper West Region but was born in Accra to his Wala parents. Chief had his basic education at the Association International School in Adenta proceeded to T.I Ahmadiya Secondary School in Kumasi for his secondary education. He is pursuing a Masters of Arts in Communications from the University of Ghana, where he earned his Bachelors of Arts in English and Theatre Arts.

== Career ==
Chief Moomen began performing spoken word poetry as an undergrad, influenced by his lifelong admiration for Maya Angelou as a child. He writes, reads, and performs poetry for global corporate, non-profit and state functions. In 2015, he launched an ambitious project called Heritage Theatre Series to reenact the history of Ghana through a series of theatre productions. The flagship play titled WogbeJeke: Our Journey, a two and half hour production that tells the story of Ghana from ancient to modern times through a beautiful mélange of drama, music, dance and poetry.

He is also the founder of Bambu Centre, a creative hub located at Adenta, Accra, established to nurture creative skills and businesses. In 2018, CNN profiled Moomen for an edition of its African Voices. He has performed at events and venues like the National Theatre of Ghana, the 2013 Vodafone Ghana Music Awards and the opening and closing ceremonies of the 2018 Africa Women Cup of Nations with his ensemble of drummers, dancers and singers. In 2012, he performed at the burial of late Ghanaian president John Evans Attah Mills. Moomen performed at the unveiling of the FIFA World Cup Trophy at the State House in 2014.

In 2018, Moomen performed a tribute to President Hilla Limann (1979 to 1981) at his 20th Anniversary commemoration.

On May Day, 2020, Moomen performed in a virtual concert in honour of health workers in Ghana alongside other poets and musicians such as, Apiorkor, Nana Asase, Okyeame Kwame, Akwaboah, Cina Soul, Knii Lante, Fameye, Amandzeba, Tagoe Sisters, Kwabena Kwabena and Joe Mettle. On 10 December 2021, he performed at the Expo 2020 in Dubai as part of the Dignified Storytelling Forum.

== Controversies ==
In 2017, during Ghana's 60th Independence day celebration, Chief Moomen announced that his business was on the verge of collapse due to the inability of the Government of Ghana to pay him for staging his Theatre Production Wogbɛ Jɛkɛ as part of his Heritage Theatre Series, aimed at showcasing Ghanaian Culture and History. According to him, he had incurred debts from shows he had staged without full payment and could no longer continue as a result of the devastating effect it had on his theatre business. He then cancelled subsequent shows due to the fact that he could not afford to stage any more shows with this debt.
