= Padmore Enyonam Agbemabiese =

Ghanaian poet and scholar (born 1952)

Padmore Enyonam Agbemabiese (born 1952, Abor, Volta Region, Ghana) is a Ghanaian poet, scholar and lecturer in the Department of African American and African Studies at Ohio State University.

== Early life ==
At Primary 5, he passed the Common Entrance Examination and left for secondary school at Sogakofe in September 1965. In December that same year, tragedy struck when his father suffered a stroke, and young Padmore Agbemabiese had to return home to take care of his sick father. After being with his father for almost four years he went back to continue with his college education. About three months into the school year, on December 14, 1969, his father died leaving Agbemabiese and his siblings orphans. At the age of 17, he began working odd jobs, farming, raising poultry, and goats, in order to save money to go back to college again. After two years, he enrolled in Abor Secondary School, a community infant school, for his O-Levels. He worked so hard that in 1974 he scored Division One at the GCE "O" Level becoming the first student to score such a high grade since the inception of the school.

He decided to go to Peki Government Teacher Training College to become a teacher. Unfortunately, the then Vice Principal of the college, Mr. Tawiah, looking at his excellent grades at the "O" Level, talked him out of it and helped him go to Kpandu Secondary School for his A-Levels. Young Padmore Agbemabiese continued writing poems and plays, and visiting schools and colleges to raise money for his needs. With no one to support his efforts, his grandmother, Madam Afeafa Fiador-Agbemabiese, a traditional dirge singer, took him in and ensured that he acquired literacy in the traditions and customs of the Ewes alongside his formal school education. He was able to pass the GCE Advanced Level exams.

Agbemabiese received four undergraduate degrees from the University of Ghana, Legon. He graduated at the top of his class in English, drama, theater arts, journalism and public relations.

== Academic career ==
Years later he was admitted to The Ohio State University (US), where he received his master's degree in African American and African studies. At The Ohio State University, Padmore Agbemabiese completed his combined master's degree in one year and received the Gwen Kagey Award for High Academic Achievement. He was offered another scholarship to do his Ph.D. in English. Within 3 years he completed his Ph.D. in English and went on to do two other doctorate degrees in education and African American and African studies. When Padmore Agbemabiese arrived at The Ohio State University to do his master's degree, he was offered a lectureship. Thus, while pursuing his graduate studies, he was also a lecturer in English and African literature.

After graduating from the University of Ghana, he worked at various jobs. He taught at Sogakope L. A. Middle School, Zion Secondary School at Anloga and Awudome Secondary School at Tsito-Awudome in the Volta Region of Ghana. Later, he became a journalist with the Ghanaian Times Corporation, in the Sogakope, Keta, Denu, Abor and Aflao area.

He was the first journalist to open the southern Volta Region to news reporting and won admiration for his articles and reportage. He was also a news reporter for Ghana Radio and TV and a regular contributor-poet for the GBC 2 radio program Voices of Our Times, hosted by Gerthrude Opare-Addo for more than ten years. However, he was best known for his Ewe poems on Ewe Hakpanyawo a GBC Radio One program hosted by Komivi Adatsi on Saturdays and repeated on Wednesday evenings. In 1985, Agbemabiese assisted a Task Force that initiated the Ghana Tourism '86.

Later, he was commissioned by the National Commission on Culture to open cultural centers at Anlo, Tongu and Keta districts. His hard work brought cultural programmes and offices to Sogakope, Keta, Akatsi and Denu districts. He helped organize the Pan African Historical Festival (PANAFEST) and worked there for a while. He was part of the organizers of Ghana Inter-Tourism 1986. He assisted in 1986 to refine the Anlo Hogbetsotso Festival.

Agbemabiese is the co-founder of the College of Education International Club, and its vice president. He is also a member of the National Council of Teachers of English, USA and a member of the Ghana National Association of Teachers (Ghana).

He is currently a full professor of English and literature at a university in the US.

== Publications ==
Over the years, he became a renowned bilingual poet. He has written and published in both English and Ewe. Some of his poems have been translated into Swahili and Hindu. His Ewe titles include Senyee Wom Alea (1996) and Migblem Di Kpo (1996), while his English titles include "Letter to the Judge" (2013), "Can You Give Me Your Heart" (2012), Prophecy (1999), With Guns and Roses (1999), Voyages (2003) and The Smell of Exile. He has also published critical essays, short stories and poems in various newspapers and journals including Essence Magazine, Come Into Our Whirl, African Weekender and Taj Mahal Review (India). He also has two novels, "Go Ask Grandma" (2002), and "Why Can't Anybody Hear Me When I Cry?" (2004).

He has published numerous books of poetry, prose and articles on education in developing countries of the world.

== Awards ==
- 1998 Gwen Kagey Award for High Academic Achievement: High Academic Achievement, OSU
- Black Writers Association Conference 2002, Atlanta, GA, USA
- 2002 Golden Pen Award: First Runner-Up: Best Black Poet of the Year 2002
- 2003 Howard Francis Seely Memorial Scholarship Award: For Best OSU
- 2005 Ohio State University, College of Education—2005 Distinguished Diversity Enhancement Award for Teaching and Scholarship
- 2007 Julius Nyerere Distinguished Humanitarian & Community Development Award, USA
- 2007 Nnamdi Azikiwe Award for Journalism and Scholarship, USA

Currently, Agbemabiese is involved in a series of research projects, paramount among which is "The Study of Anlo-Ewe Proverbs and Appellations as Principles of Argumentative and Persuasive Discourse". This project embodies an interpretive and theatrical study of aspects of literary traditions created and nurtured by the Ewes of Ghana. The study involves investigation of their mode of existence, their distinctive styles of presentation and their significance as crucial elements of contemporary discourse related to socio-economic and political transformation of the Ewes and Africans at large

Dr. Padmore Agbemabiese passed away in the early hours of April 9, 2025, at the Abor Hospital in his hometown of Abor, Volta Region, Ghana. He succumbed to a brief illness.
