= Efua Sutherland =

Ghanaian writer, publisher, educator and cultural activist (1924–1996)

- Born: Efua Theodora Morgue; 27 June 1924; Cape Coast, Central Region, Gold Coast
- Died: 2 January 1996 (aged 71); Accra, Greater Accra Region, Ghana
- Education: St. Monica's Training College, Ghana; Homerton College, Cambridge (BA); School of Oriental and African Studies
- Occupations: Playwright-director, author, poet, educator, publisher, cultural activist, child advocate
- Notable work: Playtime in Africa (1961); New Life in Kyerefaso (1960); Edufa (1967); The Marriage of Anansewa (1975)
- Spouse: Bill Sutherland
- Children: Esi Sutherland-Addy, Ralph Sutherland, and Amowi Sutherland Phillips

Efua Theodora Sutherland (born 27 June 1924 – 2 January 1996) was a Ghanaian playwright, director, dramatist, children's author, poet, educationalist, researcher, child advocate, and cultural activist. Her works include the plays Foriwa (1962), Edufa (1967), and The Marriage of Anansewa (1975). She founded the Ghana Drama Studio, the Ghana Society of Writers, the Ghana Experimental Theatre, and a community project called the Kodzidan (Story House). As Ghana's earliest playwright-director, she was an influential figure in the development of modern Ghanaian theatre, and helped to introduce the study of African performance traditions at university level. She was also a pioneering African publisher, establishing the company Afram Publications in Accra in the 1970s. Sutherland was instrumental in nurturing a new generation of Ghanaian playwrights and poets through the Drama Studio, many of whom went on to shape modern West African literature.

She was a cultural advocate for children from the early 1950s until her death, and played a role in developing educational curricula, literature, theatre and film for and about Ghanaian children. Her 1960 photo essay Playtime in Africa, co-authored with Willis E. Bell, highlighted the centrality of play in children's development and was followed in the 1980s by her leadership in the development of a model public children's parks system for the country.

Sutherland's pan-Africanism was reflected in her support for its principles and her collaborations with African and African diaspora personalities in a range of disciplines, including interactions with Chinua Achebe, Ama Ata Aidoo, Maya Angelou, W. E. B. Du Bois and Shirley Graham Du Bois, Margaret Busby, Tom Feelings, Langston Hughes, Martin Luther King and Coretta Scott King, Femi Osofisan, Félix Morisseau-Leroy, Es'kia Mphahlele, Wole Soyinka and Ngugi wa Thiong'o. Having in 1980 written an original proposal for a pan-African historical theatre festival in Ghana as a cultural vehicle for bringing together Africans around the globe, Sutherland was the inspiration behind the biennial Pan-African festival of theatre arts known as PANAFEST, first held in 1992.

Efua Sutherland died in Accra aged 71 in 1996.

== Education and early career ==
She was born as Efua Theodora Morgue in Cape Coast, Gold Coast (now Ghana), where she studied teaching at St Monica's Training College in Mampong. She then went to England to continue her education, earning a BA degree at Homerton College, Cambridge University — one of the first African women to study there — and studying linguistics at the School of Oriental and African Studies (SOAS), University of London.

Returning to Ghana in 1951, she taught first at Fijai Secondary School at Sekondi, then at St. Monica's School (1951–54), and also began writing for children. She would later say: "I started writing seriously in 1951. I can even remember the precise time. It was at Easter. I had been thinking about the problem of literature in my country for a very long time. I was on teaching practice with my students once in a village and I got positively angry about the kind of literature that the children were being forced into. It had nothing to do with their environment, their social circumstances or anything. And so I started writing."

In 1954, she married Bill Sutherland, an African American and Pan-Africanist, who in 1953 had moved to Ghana. They had three children – educationalist Esi Sutherland-Addy, architect Ralph Sutherland, and lawyer Amowi Sutherland Phillips) – and she helped her husband in the establishment of a school in the Transvolta area.

== Literary production ==
When the Gold Coast became the independent nation of Ghana in 1957, Efua Sutherland organised the Ghana Society of Writers (later the Ghana Association of Writers), which in 1960 brought out the first issue of the literary magazine Okyeame, with Sutherland eventually becoming editor.

Sutherland experimented creatively with storytelling and other dramatic forms from indigenous Ghanaian traditions. Her plays were often based on traditional stories, but also borrowed from Western literature, transforming African folktale conventions into modern dramatic theatre techniques. Many of her poems and other writings were broadcast on The Singing Net, a popular radio programme started by Henry Swanzy, and were subsequently published in his 1958 anthology Voices of Ghana. The 1960 first issue of Okyeame magazine contains her short story "Samantaase", a retelling of a folktale. Her best known plays are Edufa (1967) (based on Alcestis by Euripides), Foriwa (1967), and The Marriage of Anansewa (1975).

In 1958, Sutherland founded the Ghana Experimental Theatre, which was based at the Ghana Drama Studio built by Sutherland and launched by President Kwame Nkrumah in 1963 with Joe de Graft as its first director. Sited in downtown Accra, the Drama Studio became a training ground for a range of theatre practitioners from all over Africa. In 1962, she joined the staff of the new School of Music and Drama, headed by J. H. Kwabena Nketia. In 1963, when Sutherland took on the role of Research Associate at the Institute of African Studies, University of Ghana, she brought along with her the Ghana Drama Studio, which became an off-campus training space, called the University of Ghana Drama Studio. Sutherland, in addition to her field research and teaching in African Dramatic Forms, was a core member of the team that conceptualised and established the School of Performing Arts. Also concerned with traditional storytelling and developing community theatre, she founded the Kodzidan (Story House) in Ekumfi-Atwia, Central Region, which was recognised worldwide as a pioneering model in theatre for development.

Sutherland mentored and was in turn inspired by many of Ghana's accomplished writers, including Ama Ata Aidoo, Kofi Anyidoho and Meshack Asare.

In the early 1970s, Sutherland co-founded the publishing company Afram Publications, which was incorporated in 1973, and in March 1974 began operating from her private studio in "Araba Mansa", her compound at Dzorwulu, Accra. Sutherland remained involved in Afram's editorial work until her death.

== Cultural activism and pan-Africanism ==
Sutherland's work attracted the attention of creatives from the global African world. Maya Angelou's fifth volume of memoirs All God's Children Need Traveling Shoes testifies to the emotional support and entrée into Ghanaian society afforded her in the 1960s by Efua Sutherland who became a close friend.

Sutherland had met Dr W. E. B. Du Bois when she led the Ghana delegation to the 1958 Afro-Asian Writers Conference in Tashkent (now the capital of Uzbekistan). She was to personally intervene, at his death in Accra, Ghana in 1963, to support Mrs Shirley Du Bois. In the 1980s Sutherland was instrumental in establishing the W.E.B. Du Bois Memorial Centre for Pan African Culture and mausoleum at the Du Bois' Accra home.

In 1980, Sutherland wrote a paper entitled "Proposal for a Historical Drama Festival in Cape Coast", underscoring the significance she attached to connections between Africa and its Diaspora. This inspired the venture that came to fruition as the state-sponsored PANAFEST, the first Pan-African Historical Theater Festival, which was held in Cape Coast, Elmina and Accra, Ghana, from 12 to 19 December 1992, under the theme "The Re-emergence of African Civilization".

== Advocacy for children ==
Sutherland presided over Ghana's ratification of the UN Convention on the Rights of the Child (the first country to do so) and chaired the National Commission on Children from 1983 to 1990, a period that marked the most vigorous and comprehensive child advocacy on a national scale in the history of Ghana. In this capacity, she steered a number of innovative programmes, including a Child Education Fund to support underserved communities, the Mobile Technical Workshop extending science learning to poor or rural children, and the securing of land to seed model child-centred park and library complexes around the country. She laid the groundwork for the Mmofra Foundation, active since 1997 as a civic organisation dedicated to enriching the cultural and intellectual lives of all children in Ghana. In 2012 the Playtime in Africa Initiative, inspired by her eponymous 1961 book, was launched to revitalise child-friendly public space advocacy.

Her final most significant work at the Institute of African Studies, Legon, was her Children's Drama Development Project, which was aimed at developing materials, methods and staff for programmes of creative dramatics in and out of school. Sutherland was invited by UNICEF to join a worldwide network of scholars to consider a code of human rights for the protection of children.

Florence Laast, founder of Accra's St Martin de Porres School, speaking of how her own life had been impacted by Sutherland's mentorship, described her as "one of the greatest thinkers of our time" who believed that "the home is our first classroom, and our parents the first teachers".

== Legacy ==
- Following the 1992 construction of the National Theatre of Ghana on the site occupied by the Drama Studio, a replica of the Studio was constructed on the campus of the University of Ghana as part of the facilities of the School of Performing Arts. On the occasion of the 50th anniversary of the university, the Studio was renamed the Efua Sutherland Drama Studio.

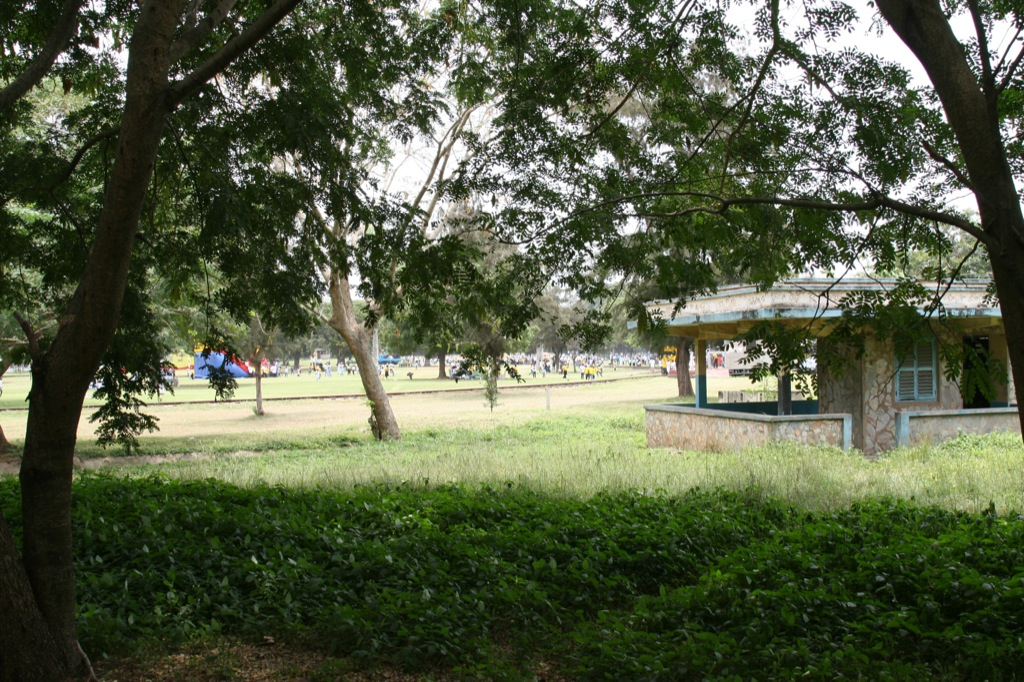
Efua Sutherland Children's Park. Located near the centre of Accra, this 12-acre public space was secured by Sutherland in the 1980s as a park for all children.

- A 12-acre space in central Accra reserved as a children's park in central Accra through the advocacy of Efua Sutherland and it is named after her.
- Efua Sutherlandstraat is one of a number of streets in an area of Amsterdam, The Netherlands, named after significant women writers and activists.
- Active since 1997, Mmofra Foundation was established by Efua Sutherland in her final years and is dedicated to enriching the cultural and intellectual lives of all children in Ghana. For over 20 years, thousands of children have benefited from its literary, nature-sensitive and creativity-oriented programmes.
- A green cultural space/park called Mmofra Place in the Dzorwulu area of Accra is open to children of all backgrounds, thanks to the estate of Efua T. Sutherland.
- Efua Sutherland Hall is a student hall of residence at Ashesi University, Berekuso, Ghana.
- The Legacy of Efua Sutherland: Pan African Cultural Activism, a volume in her honour was published in 2007, edited by Anne V. Adams and Esi Sutherland-Addy. Contributors are: Anne Adams, Esi Sutherland-Addy, Ama Ata Aidoo, Maya Angelou, Kofi Anyidoho, Sandy Arkhurst, William Branch, Margaret Busby, John Collins, David Donkor, James Gibbs, Comfort Caulley-Hanson, Biodun Jeyifo, Robert July, Mabel Komasi, Florence Laast, John Lemly, Jurgen Martini, Michael McMullan, Penina Mlama, Femi Osofisan, Sandra Richards, Amowi Sutherland Phillips, Ola Rotimi, Margaret Watts, Henry Wellington, and Vivian Windley.
- Writer, poet, lecturer and diplomat Abena P. A. Busia devoted a chapter to Efua Sutherland ("To the Roadmaker: Fragments of a Meditation") in her volume of poems Traces of a Life: A Collection of Elegies and Praise Poems (Ayebia Clarke Publishing, 2008).
- Sutherland's legacy was celebrated at the 2024 All African Women Poetry Festival held in Accra, with the theme "Poetry and Play", as part of events marking the centenary of her birth.

== Works briefly annotated ==
Sutherland experimented creatively with storytelling and other dramatic forms from indigenous Ghanaian traditions. Her plays were often based on traditional stories, but also borrowed from Western literature, transforming African folktale conventions into modern dramatic theatre techniques. Many of her poems and other writings were broadcast on The Singing Net, a popular radio programme started by Henry Swanzy, and were subsequently published in his 1958 anthology Voices of Ghana. The 1960 first issue of Okyeame magazine contains her short story "Samantaase", a retelling of a folktale. Her best known plays are Edufa (1967) (based on Alcestis by Euripides), Foriwa (1967), and The Marriage of Anansewa (1975).

In Edufa the eponymous character seeks to escape death by manipulating his wife, Ampoma, to the death that has been predicted for him by oracles. In the play, Sutherland uses traditional Ghanaian beliefs in divination and the interaction of traditional and European ceremonies in order to portray Edufa as a rich and successful modern person who is held in high esteem by his people. The play uses traditional ritual and symbolism, but the story is told in the context of Edufa's capitalistic abandonment of his moral commitment to his wife, while his wife and the other women favour the morality of the past.

In Foriwa the eponymous character, who is the daughter of the queen mother of Kyerefaso, and Labaran, a graduate from northern Ghana who lives a simple life, bring enlightenment to Kyerefaso, a town that has become backward and ignorant because the town's elders refuse to learn new ways. Foriwa's main theme is the alliance of old traditions and new ways. The play has a national theme to promote a new national spirit in Ghana that would encourage openness to new ideas and inter-ethnic cooperation.

The Marriage of Anansewa: A Storytelling Drama (1975) is considered Sutherland's most valuable contribution to Ghanaian drama and theater. In the play, she transmutes traditional Akan tales of Ananse Spider (Anansesem) into a new dramatic structure, which she calls Anansegoro. Nyamekye (a version of Alice in Wonderland), one of her later plays, shows how she was influenced by the folk opera tradition.

Sutherland was also an author of works for children. These works included two animated rhythm plays, Vulture! Vulture! and Tahinta (1968), and two pictorial essays, with photographs by Willis Bell (1924–2000): Playtime in Africa (1960) and The Roadmakers (1961). Many of her short stories can be described as rhythmic prose poems. Voice in the Forest, a book of the folklore and fairytales of Ghana, was published in 1983.

Playtime in Africa has been described "a groundbreaking book on Ghana's play culture", which Sutherland considered important for in developing young minds and bodies. Not only was it published three years after Ghana's independence it was the first documentation of children's play culture in Ghana. The book presented the nuances of children's lives to forefront of society and it also ushered in an indigenous movement in writing for children, along with publishing and development through drama for children.

A Voice in the Forest is a text that powerfully portrays the political, economic, and social complexity of colonialism and cultural relativism in Ghana in regards to children. The text is a retelling of an Akan folktale and deals with traditional cultural values through the role of the trickster figure. It tells the story of a man named Bempong who unknowingly discovers a Samanta, a wood nymph, and brings her back to his village. Initially Bempong believes the Samanta is a lost girl, wandering alone through the forest. For the first half of the story the Samanta refuses to speak. It is not until Bempong cuts off her hair, in an effort to tame her outgrown hair, that Bempong realizes this girl is a Samanta, a wood nymph—"a creature of strange magical powers". Finding her voice in a moment of anger, the Samanta curses the village, leaving them with no food until she has her hair back. The hero of the book is Afrum, Bempong's son, who is regarded as the village fool. Sutherland's choice to celebrate the fool is a part of a longer lineage of uses of the trickster figure in African literature.

== Honours ==
Sutherland was honoured with a Google Doodle on 27 June 2018, which would have been her 94th birthday.

In 2020, at an event marking International Women's Day, Sutherland was honoured by 3Music Awards for her achievements in the entertainment industry.

In March 2024, the estate of Efua Sutherland launched a centenary celebration of her life and legacy in Accra, unveiling plans to commemorate the year in which she would have turned 100.

== Selected bibliography ==
- with Willis E. Bell, Playtime in Africa (for children), Accra: Self-published, 1960
- with Willis E. Bell, The Roadmakers: a picture book of Ghana (for children). Accra: Ghana Information Services / London: Newman Neame, 1961, 1963
- with Willis E. Bell, Playtime in Africa (for children), New York: Atheneum, 1962
- Edufa (play), Longman, 1967
- Foriwa: A Play in Three Acts, Accra-Tema: State Publishing Corporation, 1967
- Tahinta (1968)
- Vulture! Vulture! and Tahina: Two Rhythm Plays, Tema: Ghana Publishing House, 1968
- Odasani (play), Accra: Anowuo Educational Publications, 1969
- with Willis Bell, The Original Bob: The Story of Bob Johnson, Ghana's Ace Comedian (play), Accra: Anowuo Educational Publications, 1970
- Anansegoro: Story-Telling Drama in Ghana, Accra: Afram, 1975
- The Marriage of Anansewa (play), London: Longman, 1977, 1980; Washington, DC: Three Continents Press, 1980
- The Voice in the Forest: A Tale from Ghana, Philomel Books, 1983

== See also ==
- Flora Nwapa, Nigerian writer and publisher
- Margaret Busby, Ghanaian publisher
