= Feli Nuna =

Ghanaian musician

- Also known as: Felly, Also Daavi Diva, Queen Femcee, Edzoleme
- Born: Felicia Nuna Akosua Tawiah; Accra, Ghana
- Origin: Volta Region, Ghana
- Genres: Afro pop; Afrobeat; Highlife; Hip hop; RnB
- Occupations: Singer; songwriter
- Years active: 2012–present
- Label: BeeHyve Entertainment (Former)

Felicia Nuna Akosua Tawiah better known by her stage name Feli Nuna (/f3li nuna/; born May 20) is a Ghanaian rapper, singer, songwriter director and producer. She signed her first record deal as 'Felly' with Lynx entertainment in 2012 and released her first official single 'Ghana Girl Swag' but disappeared off the scene for personal reasons and later resurfaced in 2015 under Beehyve Entertainment. Under Lynx Entertainment, she released ‘Ghana Girl Swag’ with the hit single "I like am". She then resurfaced with a new rebrand as Feli Nuna in 2015 under Beehyve Entertainment her former label with 'I like Am' and has been active since then. As a performer, she has exhibited on local and international platforms including The Ghana Music Awards Nominees Concert (2016 4Syte Music Video Awards (2016), and performed on at Coke Studio Africa (2016), Yaws Fashion Show (Gambia 2017), Asia-Africa Youth Festival (China, 2017).

== Early life and education ==
Feli Nuna was born in Accra Ghana on May 20, 1990, to Col. Theophilus Tawiah (Rtd) and Ms Sitsofe Dzansi. She hails from Leklebi Agbesia in the Volta Region of Ghana. She acquired her nursery, primary through to Basic Education at University of Ghana Basic School and her Senior Secondary Education at Akosombo International School. She was then admitted into the University of Ghana in 2009 where she studied English, sociology and psychology. She graduated with a Bachelor of Arts in Sociology and Psychology.

== Musical career ==
She signed her first record deal as 'Felly' with Lynx entertainment in 2012. Under Lynx Entertainment, she released ‘Ghana Girl Swag’. Relationship between Feli Nuna and lynx Entertainment didn't go well and she ended up leaving the record label. In 2015, she signed with Beehyve entertainment and released ‘I like am ‘ which was her second single as an artists and her first single under her new management. She stood as a judge on the Voice of West Hills Mall in 2016, and has performed on credible big local platforms including The Ghana Music Awards Nominees Concert (2016) 4Syte Music Video Awards (2016), and also performed on at Coke Studio Africa (2016), Yaws Fashion Show (Gambia 2017), Asia-Africa Youth Festival (China, 2017).

== Collaboration ==
- Awola ft Pappy Kojo
- Show Me ft Kuami Eugene
- Me and You ft RCee
- Love Me Now ft Stonebwoy
- DJ Lord Sokolala ft (Feli Nuna) –
- Knii Lante- You (ft Feli Nuna)-

== Videography ==
- I Like Am-
- Lose Control -
- Afro Magic-
- Gelaway-
- Dream-
- Me and You-
- Edzoleme-
- Love Me Now-
- Azaa-
