= Asiakwa =

- Urban area
- Location within Ghana
- Country: Ghana
- Region: Eastern Region
- District: East Akim District
- Time zone: GMT
  - Summer (DST): GMT

Asiakwa is a town in the East Akim District of the Eastern Region of Ghana.

The town includes a SOS Children's Village since 1992. The village provides services to support vulnerable children and families.

This includes medical help, schooling, counselling and HIV awareness.

Asiakwa is the birthplace of Cameron Duodu, a journalist who had a good relationship with Nelson Mandela and met him several times

Furthermore, Asiakwa is close to Umbrella Rock and Boti Falls.
