= Okyeame =

Ghanaian literary magazine

- Editor: Kofi Awoonor
- Categories: Literary magazine
- Frequency: infrequently
- Founded: 1960
- Final issue: 1972
- Country: Ghana
- Language: English
- Website: Chimurenga Library

Okyeame was a literary magazine founded by the Ghana Society of Writers in the post-Independence era, which saw the rapid rise of a new generation of thinkers, writers and poets in the country. The first issue of Okyeame appeared in 1960, and issues were published, at irregular intervals, up until 1972. Inspired by Kwame Nkrumah, the first Prime Minister of Ghana, the publication sought to explore the experiences of Africa from a new intellectual framework. Writers published in the magazine include its first editor Kofi Awoonor, Efua Sutherland (later also editor), Ayi Kwei Armah and Ama Ata Aidoo.

== Background ==
The publication took its name from a traditional Ghanaian figure, the "spokesperson" or "linguist" responsible for channelling communication between a leader and his people; as a symbol of his authority to speak for the chief, the okyeame carries a staff, the top of which is carved to represent a proverb or saying. Okyeame magazine sought to give voice to Kwame Nkrumah's dream of a new African identity. Articles called for a Ghanaian poetry whose content and form was based on oral tradition, drum poetry. These ran alongside traditional oral works translated by leading contemporary poets, such as founding editor Kofi Awoonor, and texts were interspersed with icons and Adinkra symbols.

Like its namesake, Okyeame was not simply a mouthpiece; it was also an "interpreter" and an "ambassador in foreign courts". It provided a platform for a new generation of writers to experiment with a versatile, hybrid Pan-African linguistics that combined African oral influences with African-American literary devices; rural with urban imagery; phonetic innovations with lyricism and wordplay; and dirge rhythms with jazz free-play. The Okyeame magazine era is recalled by some scholars such as a time when its writers functioned "like the foot soldiers of Nkrumah in the cultural field".

Appearing sometimes twice a year, Okyeame published poetry, short stories and drama, as well as a section for news and reviews. Contributors included some of the country's most influential writers and critics, such as Ayi Kwei Armah, Ama Ata Aidoo, Efua T. Sutherland, Kofi Awoonor, and others. In an article in Transition magazine "On Okyeame", Lewis Nkosi expressed the view that "the history of literary movements is more often written in some long forgotten dead little magazine", and the Black Orpheus reviewer (possibly Gerald Moore, who had reviewed the first issue of Okyeame in Black Orpheus no. 10) wrote: "The function of periodicals in nurturing the new literatures in Africa and the Caribbean cannot be overstated They represent necessary documentary proof of fashion and growth. Their function is not so much to preserve as to link. Often they stand at the very beginning of the development of local literature, setting up standards and providing a literary market for buyer and seller — the indigenous reading public and its artist."
