= Ellis Ayitey Komey =

Ghanaian writer

- Born: 1927
- Died: 27 July 1972 (aged 44–45)
- Education: University of London
- Occupations: Writer and poet

Ellis Ayitey Komey (1927 – 27 July 1972) was a Ghanaian writer and poet.

== Early years and education ==
Komey was born in 1927 in Labadi, a suburb of Accra in the British colony of the Gold Coast.

He had his early education at Methodist Senior Boys' School then the Accra Academy then later proceeded to the University of London.

== Career and works ==
He spent 16 years of his life in England. For six years, he was editor of the international black magazine Flamingo. He was manager of Ludeco, an organisation that deals with publishing, public relations and tourism.

His short stories and poems appeared in anthologies and journals including Flamingo and West African Review. He compiled the anthology Modern African Stories with Ezekiel Mphahlele (later known as Es'kia Mphahlele).

Some of his poems are also found in the anthology Messages: Poems from Ghana, compiled by Kofi Awoonor and Geormbeeyi Adali-Mortty.

== Death ==
Komey died on 27 July 1972 at Korle Bu Hospital in Accra, Ghana.

== See also ==
- The Penguin Book of Modern African Poetry
- List of Ghanaian writers
