= Meira Chand =

Meira Chand (born 1942) is a novelist of Swiss-Indian parentage and was born and educated in London.

== Life ==
She was born and grew up in South London. Her mother, Norah Knoble was of Swiss origin, and her Indian father, Habans Lal Gulati came to London in 1919 to study medicine. He was Britain's first Indian GP, a pioneer of early NHS services and the Socialist Medical Association, and first Indian Labour member of the London County Council for South Battersea, standing as a parliamentary candidate. She attended Putney High School and later studied art at St Martin's School of Art & Design and Hammersmith Art School.

In 1962, she married Kumar Chand and went with him to live in the Kobe/Osaka region of Japan. In 1971, she relocated with her husband and two children to Mumbai in India but returned to Japan in 1976. She remained in Japan until 1997, when she moved to Singapore, where she now permanently lives, becoming a Singapore citizen in 2011. She has an MA in creative writing from Edith Cowan University, Perth, Australia, and a PhD in creative writing from the University of Western Australia.

== Writing ==
Five of her eight novels are set in Japan: The Gossamer Fly, Last Quadrant, The Bonsai Tree, The Painted Cage and A Choice of Evils, a novel of the Pacific War that explores the Japanese occupation of China, and questions of war guilt and responsibility. Contemporary India is the location of House of the Sun that, in 1990, was adapted for the stage in London where it had a successful run at Theatre Royal Stratford East. It was the first Asian play with an all-Asian cast and direction to be performed in London. The play was voted Critic's Choice by Time Out magazine. Also set in India, but in Calcutta during the early days of the Raj, A Far Horizon considers the notorious story of the Black Hole of Calcutta. Written after her move to Singapore, A Different Sky takes place against the backdrop of colonial times before independence in the country. Based on historical research, the novel follows the lives of three families in the 30 years leading up to Singapore's independence. The book fictionally examines an era that includes the Second World War and the subsequent Japanese occupation of Singapore, and the rise of post-war nationalism in Malaya. On its publication in 2010 it was chosen as a Book of the Month by the UK bookshop chain Waterstones. The novel was also on Oprah Winfrey's recommended reading list for November 2011, and longlisted for the IMPAC Dublin literary award 2012.

She wrote the story from which The LKY Musical, the 2015 Singaporean theatre production was developed. The musical centres on the early life of Lee Kuan Yew, his struggles, and enduring relationship with his wife. In Singapore, she is involved in programmes to nurture young writers and to develop literature and promote reading.

== Selected works ==
- The Gossamer Fly (1979, John Murray, UK / Ticknor and Fields, USA) ISBN 978-0-89919-002-0
- Last Quadrant (1981, John Murray, UK / Ticknor and Fields, USA) ISBN 978-0-89919-079-2
- The Bonsai Tree (1983, John Murray, UK, Ticknor and Fields, USA) ISBN 978-0-7195-4007-3
- The Painted Cage (1986, Century Hutchinson, UK) ISBN 978-0-7126-1274-6
- House of the Sun (1989, Hutchinson, UK) ISBN 978-0-09-174003-0
- A Choice of Evils (1996 Weidenfeld & Nicolson, UK) ISBN 978-0-297-81743-7
- A Far Horizon (2001, Weidenfeld & Nicolson, UK) ISBN 978-0-297-81748-2
- A Different Sky (2010, Harvill Secker/Random House, UK) ISBN 978-1-84655-343-1
- Sacred Waters (2018, Marshall Cavendish, Singapore) ISBN 978-981-4779-50-0
