= Gabriel Okara =

Nigerian poet and novelist (1921–2019)

- Born: Gabriel Imomotimi Gbaingbain Okara; 24 April 1921; Bomoundi, Eastern Region, British Nigeria
- Died: 25 March 2019 (aged 97); Yenagoa, Bayelsa State, Nigeria
- Education: Government College Umuahia; Yaba Higher College
- Occupations: Novelist, poet
- Notable work: The Voice

Gabriel Imomotimi Okara (24 April 1921 – 25 March 2019) was a Nigerian poet and novelist who was born in Bumoundi, a small town in Rivers State, Nigeria. The first modernist poet of Anglophone Africa, he is best known for his early experimental novel, The Voice (1964), and his award-winning poetry, published in The Fisherman's Invocation (1978) and The Dreamer, His Vision (2005). In both his poems and his prose, Okara drew on African thought, religion, folklore and imagery, and he has been called "the Nigerian Negritudist". According to Brenda Marie Osbey, editor of his Collected Poems, "It is with publication of Gabriel Okara's first poem that Nigerian literature in English and modern African poetry in this language can be said truly to have begun."

== Biography ==
Gabriel Imomotimi Gbaingbain Okara, the son of an Ijọ chief, was born in Bomoundi in the Niger Delta in 1921. He was educated at Government College Umuahia, and later at Yaba Higher College. During World War II, he attempted to enlist in the British Royal Air Force but did not complete pilot training, instead he worked for a time for the British Overseas Airways Corporation (later British Airways).

In 1945, Okara found work as a printer and bookbinder for colonial Nigeria's government-owned publishing company. He remained in that post for nine years, during which he began to write. At first, he translated poetry from Ijaw into English and wrote scripts for government radio. He studied journalism at Northwestern University in 1949, and before the outbreak of the Nigerian Civil War (1967–70) worked as Information Officer for the Eastern Nigerian Government Service. Together with Chinua Achebe, Okara was roving ambassador for Biafra's cause during part of 1969. From 1972 to 1980, he was director of the Rivers State Publishing House in Port Harcourt.

== Writing ==
After leaving school, Okara wrote plays and features for radio, and in 1953 his poem "The Call of the River Nun" won an award at the Nigerian Festival of Arts. Some of his poetry was published in the literary magazine Black Orpheus, and by 1960 he had won recognition as an accomplished literary craftsman, his poetry being translated into several languages. He attended the landmark African Writers Conference held on 1 June 1962 at Makerere University College in Kampala, Uganda, along with such writers as Chinua Achebe, Rajat Neogy, Bloke Modisane, Okot p'Bitek, Bernard Fonlon, Ngugi Wa Thiong’o, Olusegun Olusola, Grace Ogot, Jonathan Kariara, Rebecca Njau, Wole Soyinka, John Pepper Clark, Saunders Redding, Christopher Okigbo, Francis Ademola, Ezekiel Mphahlele, Arthur Maimane, and others.

One of Okara's most famous poems is "Piano and Drums". Another popular poem, "You Laughed and Laughed and Laughed", is a frequent feature of anthologies. Okara was very concerned with what happens when the ancient culture of Africa is faced with modern Western culture, as in his poem "Once Upon a Time".

He pursued that theme in his first novel, The Voice (1964). Its protagonist Okolo, like countless post-colonial Africans, is hunted by society and haunted by his own ideals. Experimenting linguistically in The Voice, Okara "translated directly from the Ijo (Ijaw) language, imposing Ijo syntax onto English in order to give literal expression to African ideas and imagery. The novel creates a symbolic landscape in which the forces of traditional African culture and Western materialism contend.... Okara’s skilled portrayal of the inner tensions of his hero distinguished him from many other Nigerian novelists."

In addition to his poetry and fiction, Okara also wrote plays and features for broadcasting.

Many of his unpublished manuscripts were destroyed during the Nigerian Civil War.

In April 2017, the Gabriel Okara Literary Festival was held at the University of Port Harcourt in his honour. The publication in May 2017 of the book Gabriel Okra, edited by Professor Chidi T. Maduka, addressed Okara's "place in African literature and the fact that he has not been given his full due in African literature", which was partly attributable, said Lindsay Barrett, to Okara (like himself) not having been "university-based", while Odia Ofeimun acknowledged Okara as "not just the oldest writer but a foundational producer of the literary arts in our part of the world."

== Awards and honours ==
- 1953: Best All-Round Entry In Poetry at the Nigerian Festival of Arts, for "The Call of the River Nun"
- 1979: Commonwealth Poetry Prize, for The Fisherman's Invocation
- 2005: NLNG Prize, for The Dreamer, His Vision
- 2009: Pan African Writers' Association Honorary Membership Award
- 2017: Gabriel Okara Literary Festival

== Selected bibliography ==
- 1964: The Voice, London: Deutsch, first edition; Heinemann African Writers Series (No. 68), 1970. Africana Publishing, ISBN 0-8419-0015-9.
- 1978: The Fisherman's Invocation (poems)
- 1981: Little Snake and Little Frog (for children)
- 1992: An Adventure to Juju Island (for children)
- 2005: The Dreamer, His Vision(20) (poems)
- 2006: As I See It (poems)
- 2016: Collected Poems (edited and with an introduction by Brenda Marie Osbey), University of Nebraska Press, African Poetry Book Series, ISBN 978-0-8032-8687-0.
