= Jeffrey Nortey =

Ghanaian actor, spoken-word performer and digital creator

Jeffrey Notey
- Jeffrey at the 3 Music Awards 22
- Born: Jeffrey Tetteh Nortey; Accra, Ghana
- Other name: Dragon
- Citizenship: Ghanaian
- Education: Jayee University College
- Occupations: Actor, Performer
- Years active: 2013–present
- Awards: 2019 Golden movie awards Best Supporting Actor, 2018 Ghana movie awards Lead Actor

Jeffrey Tetteh Nortey(born in Accra) known as Jeffrey Nortey, is a Ghanaian actor, filmmaker, content creator, spoken-word performer and creative entrepreneur. His work spans film, television, digital comedy, live theatre, advertising and film production. He is associated with the character ‘Dragon’ and the live performance production 3 Faces of Jeffrey Nortey.

== Early life and education ==
Jeffrey Nortey was born on 19 May in Accra, Ghana, and hails from Dodowa in the Greater Accra Region. He attended Cosmos Basic School for his junior high school education before continuing his senior high school education at the following schools St. Thomas Aquinas Senior High School, Presbyterian Senior High School, Akuapim-Mampong and Ghanata Senior High School. He then attended the Ghallywood Academy were he studied acting and later studied journalism and public relations at Jayee University College in Accra. He's also pursuing a master's degree in Brands and Communications Management at the University of Professional Studies.

== Career ==
Jeffrey Nortey' began attending acting auditions in 2011 and commenced formal acting training in 2012. During his early career, he joined the Ghallywood Academy and appeared in productions including Living with Tricia and Stalemate.

Jeffrey Nortey received his first paid film role in 2013. By 2015, he had appeared in productions distributed through African television platforms, including the role of Cobby Jackson in Victims, which was shown on Africa Magic. He was also involved in Living with Tricia and Stalemate.

While at university, Jeffrey Nortey also worked as a television presenter. In 2017, he presented Buzz Extra and Verna Changing Lives while studying at Jayee University.

=== Digital content and comedy ===
Jeffrey expanded into digital content during the COVID-19 pandemic after the reduction in film opportunities. He began writing and producing comedy skits.

His comedy skits has featured recurring characters, wordplay and the use of Ghanaian languages. The character ‘Dragon’, created in 2023, became a prominent part of his digital creations. His Ga-language skits with actress Kalsoume Sinare and other performances have contributed to his digital profile.

== Filmography ==
Year	Title	Genre	Role
2026	Here Comes the Bride	Comedy, Drama	Tinny
2025	Red Flag	Drama, Romance	Nathan
2025	Vibes The Movie	Comedy, Musical	Lil Pui
2025	Summer	Drama	Jamil
2025	Pimp's Paradise (Mini Series)	Drama	Dilliam Doe
2025	Hidden Desires	Drama	James
2025	Tales of Shades	Drama	
2025	The Day We Lost Hope	Drama	Luscious
2024	Escape to Chaos	Comedy, Drama	
2024	Sukura: The Homecoming	Drama	
2024	Therapy	short Drama	
2024	Great and Mighty	Comedy	Joe
2024	The Storm	Action, Crime, Drama	John Harris
2024	DNA	Drama	Eugene
2024	The Groomsmen	Drama	Darius
2024	Adiza	Comedy	Ataa Oko
2024	Stuck	Drama	
2024	Love Wins	Drama	Mensah
2024	Together in Love	Romance	George
2024	Fiance for Hire	Romance/Drama	Chigozie
2024	Married to the Enemy	Drama	
2023	Accra Stay By Plan (Series)	Comedy	Julius
2023	Edge of Emotions	Drama	
2023	Forget You	Drama	Contractor
2022	Bunny	Drama	
2022	Mulika	Drama	
2022	Terminus	Crime, Thriller	Kuma
2022	Indebted	Drama, Romance	Gary
2022	The Case Study	Drama	
2021	Tito	Drama	

== Awards and nominations ==
Year	Event	Prize	Recipient	Result
2017	UMB Ghana Tertiary Awards	Most Influential Student of the Year		Won
2017	UMB Ghana Tertiary Awards	Most Influential Male TV Presenter		Won
2017	UMB Ghana Tertiary Awards	Most Influential Male Actor		Won
2018	UMB Ghana Tertiary Awards	Student Spoken Word Artist		Won
2018	UMB Ghana Tertiary Awards	Most Influential Student TV Presenter		Won
2018	Ghana Movie Awards 2018	Lead Actor	Counter Trade	Won
2019	Golden Movie Awards	Best Supporting Actor		Won
2019	Women's Choice Awards	Entertainment Act of The Year		Won
2025	Ghana Comedy Awards	Comedy Actor of The Year		Won
2025	Ghana Comedy Awards	Comedy Skit Act of the Year		Won
2025	Ghana Comedy Awards	Comic Collaboration of the Year — Kalsoume Sinare		Won
2025	Ghana Entertainment Awards USA	Screen Icon of the Year		Won
2026	Ghana Comedy Awards	Comedy Skit Act of the Year		Won
2026	Ghana Comedy Awards	Comic Writer of the Year		Won
2026	Ghana Entertainment Awards USA	Screen Icon of the Year		Won

== Other Recognition ==
- He was recognized by the Forty Under 40 Awards for the music and entertainment.
- He was awarded the Content Creator of the year by the Ga Youth Forum.
- He was recognized for the Outstanding Influence and Impact in the Digital and Entertainment Space at the National ICT Week Recognition Awards.
