= Pan African Writers' Association =

Cultural institution

The Pan African Writers' Association (PAWA), founded in November 1989, is a Ghana-based cultural institution "born in the larger crucible of Pan Africanism" that is an umbrella body of writers' associations on the African continent and the Diaspora. The mission of PAWA, unanimously accepted at its inaugural congress in November 1989, in Accra, is "to strengthen the cultural and economic bonds between the people on the African continent against the background of the continent's acknowledged diverse but rich cultural, political and economic heritage."

The highlight of the PAWA calendar is the annual lecture, given by noted African writers.

== History ==
The Constituent Congress of PAWA was held at the Kwame Nkrumah Conference Centre, Accra, Ghana, from 7 to 11 November 1989 under the theme: "African Unity; A Liberation of the Mind". Representatives from more than 36 countries formally signed the Declaration and Constitution that led to the establishment of PAWA. PAWA now comprises the 52 national writers associations on the African continent.

The position of Secretary General of PAWA was held by Professor Atukwei Okai from 1989 until his death in 2018.

In 1992, the Secretariat of PAWA, located in Accra's Roman Ridge neighbourhood, was granted full diplomatic status by the government of Ghana.

=== International African Writers' Day, 7 November ===
In 1991, the Conference of African Ministers of Education and Culture, meeting in Cotonou, Benin, resolved to establish 7 November, the day on which PAWA was founded, as International African Writers' Day, which is now celebrated throughout the continent.

In November 2015, more than 300 writers and scholars gathered to commemorate the 22nd International African Writers’ Day at a three-day conference, held in Accra, that took as its theme "Celebrating the life and works of Chinua Achebe: The Coming of Age of African Literature?", with a keynote address by Henri Lopès and presentations by James Currey, Margaret Busby and others in honour of Achebe.

In 2017, the keynote address at a colloquium marking the 24th International African Writers' Day was given by President Nana Addo Akufo-Addo.

== Activities ==
PAWA has engaged in activities that have included conferences, readings, lectures, performances, visits, writing competitions and training, as well as honouring African writers. Many leading African thinkers and writers have played prominent roles PAWA's activities, including Nobel Laureates Wole Soyinka and Nadine Gordimer, Emeritus Professor J. H. Kwabena Nketia, Professor Femi Osofisan, Prof. Ali Mazrui, and others.
