= Apiorkor Seyiram Ashong-Abbey =

Ghanaian poet

Apiorkor Seyiram Ashong–Abbey
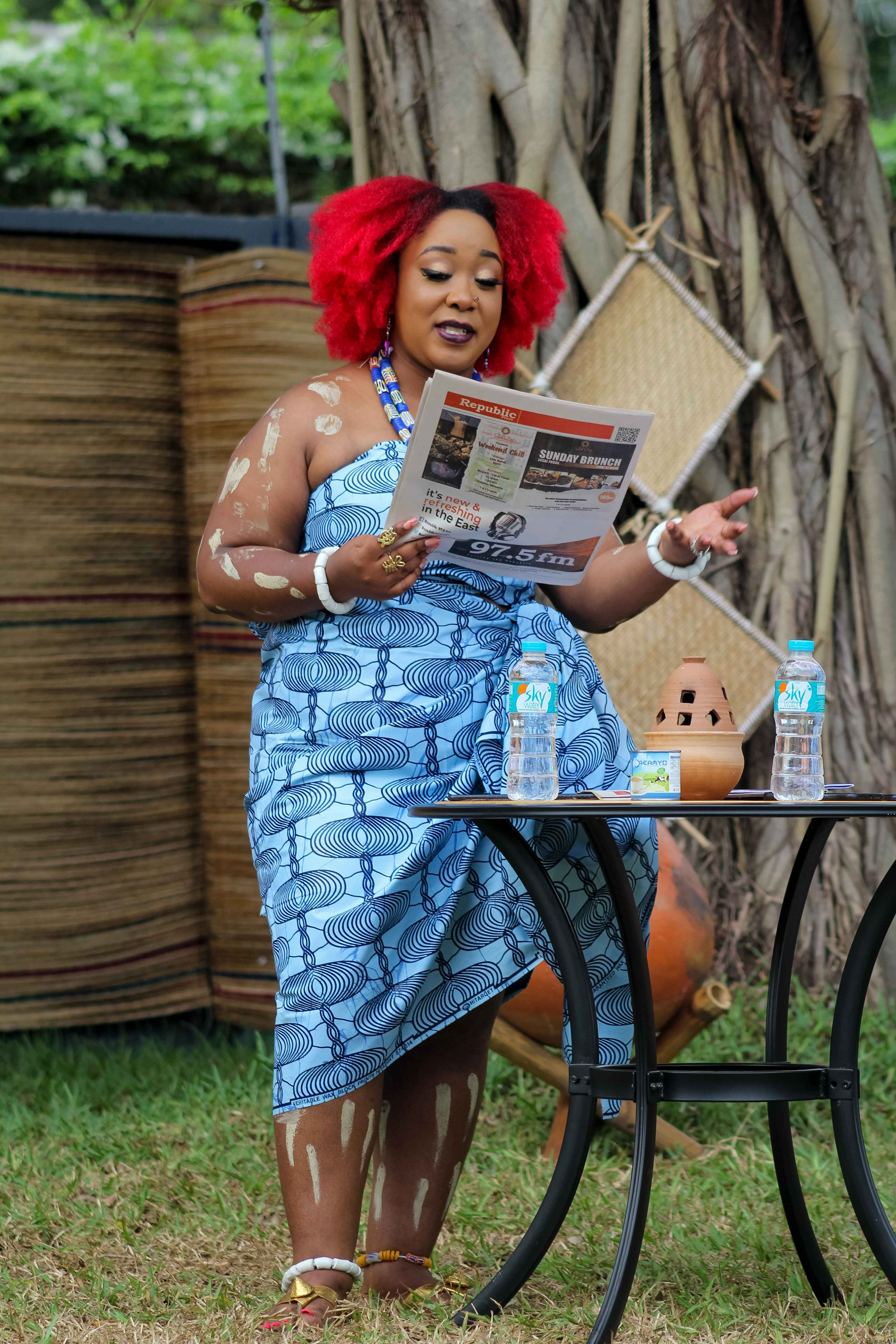
- Apiorkor Ashong-Abbey hosting TV program in Ghana on Citi TV
- Born: Apiorkor Seyiram Ashong–Abbey; 1 April 1988 (age 38); Boston, Massachusetts
- Occupations: Journalist, Television, Poet
- Years active: 1998–present

Apiorkor Seyiram Ashong–Abbey (born 1 April 1988) is a Ghanaian poet, writer, literary critic. She is currently the Head of Programmes Production with Citi FM/Citi TV and currently the host of Diplomatic License and What's Cooking on Citi TV.

She is also an editorial advisor for The InfluencHER Project, an editorial program and global community seeking to empower and amplify female voices.

== Education ==
Apiorkor attended Tema International School where she graduated and completed a Diploma program. She later went to Lafayette College in the US, and came back to Ghana to study at the University of Ghana, Legon.

== Career ==
Apiorkor is the Head of Production at Citi FM/Citi TV and the host of ‘Diplomatic License’ and 'What's Cooking' on Citi TV.

== Literary works ==
=== The Matriarch's Verse ===
Apiorkor is the author of The Matriarch's Verse, a book of poems that seeks to celebrate, challenge, and highlight what it means to be Ghanaian in the 21st Century, of this is done from her perspective as a third-culture kid.

== Performances ==
=== 2019 Republica [Berlin] ===
She performed at the 2019 edition of Republica held at Berlin, Germany.

=== TEDWomen ===
Apiorkor performed at the 2020 edition of TEDWomen which is an annual TED conference organized by the TED headquarters in New York, USA.)

=== Sundance Film Festival 2021 ===
She performed at the 2021 Sundance Film Festival which was held at the Park City, Salt Lake City, Utah in the United States. Apiorkor performed ‘Bewitched Vaginas".

== Books ==
=== When the Person Called Covid Came ===
This is a 110-page book is a collection of poems that narrates the individual struggles and triumphs that emerged during the COVID-19 pandemic.

This book is foreworded by Ablah Dzifa Gomashie.

Apiorkor explained her reason for writing the book:

“I wrote ‘When the Person Called COVID Came’ in an effort to document the unsung tales of resiliency, grief, and the human spirit’s unflinching fortitude throughout the pandemic. This book is a testament to the innumerable people who overcame extraordinary obstacles and succeeded in doing so”.

== Awards and honours ==
In 2022, the Ghana Association of Writers (GAW) awarded Apiorkor as a first-place winner for the Spoken Word category at the sixth edition of the organisation’s awards.
