= Knii Lante =

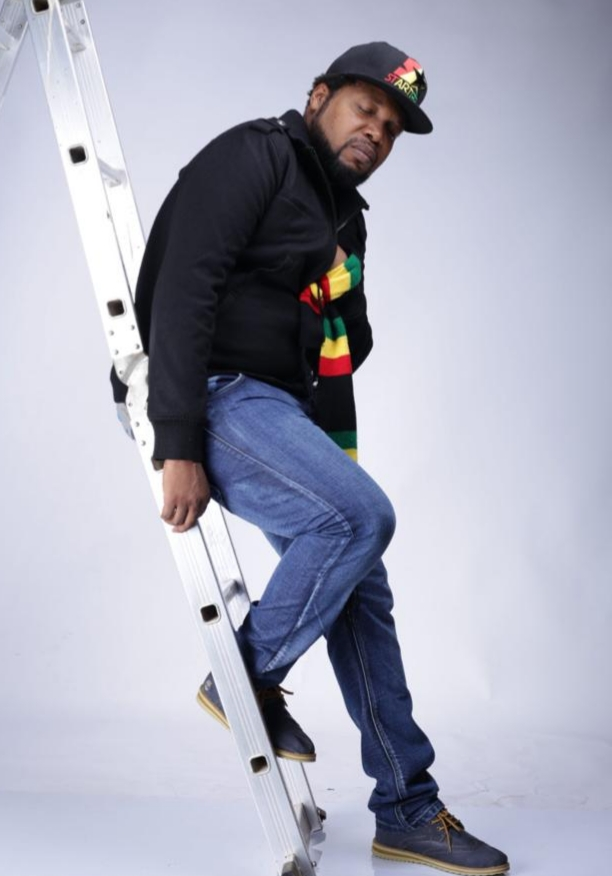
- Knii Lante

Background information
- Born: Nii Lante Okunka Blankson; Accra
- Origin: Accra, Ghana
- Genres: reggae; AfroPop
- Occupations: Musician, doctor (physician specialist)
- Instruments: Piano, guitar
- Years active: 2012–present
- Label: Independent
- Website: https://Facebook.com/KniiLanteOfficial

Nii Lante Okunka Blankson, professionally known as Knii Lante, is a Ghanaian reggae, soul, and Afro pop musician, songwriter, and medical doctor from Accra, Ghana.

== Early life and education ==
Knii Lante is a medical doctor who has a degree in BSC Human Biology, MBCHB and MWACP. He started his music career when he was still in medical school.

== Music career ==
Knii Lante's career in music started when he featured on fellow reggae musician Blakk Rasta's song titled "Obama". He also featured on Micheal Dwamena's song titled "Ngozi" which won an award for collaboration of the year at the Ghana Music Awards in 2007/2008. He is a composer who plays the piano and guitar.

He has two albums out: Love & Revolution, and True Feelings which featured Queen Ifrica and Cherine Anderson among others. He has also worked with producers Dean Fraser and Mikie Bennett.

== Tours and performances ==
Knii Lante has performed at Felabration organised at The Shrine and at Freedom Park Victoria Island in Lagos, Nigeria. He released his second album True Feelings at the Redbones Blue Cafe in Kingston, Jamaica. He has also performed at Rebel Salute in Jamaica, MASA 2018 in Côte d'Ivoire, Chale Wote Festival in Ghana, Kuchoko Festival 2018 in Ghana, and the Accra Jazz Festival in Ghana.

== Awards ==
- Best Male Vocalists Ghana Music Award 2011.
- Best Music Video of the Year Vodafone Ghana Music Awards 2014.
- Best Male Vocalist at the Bass Awards 2017.

== Discography ==
=== Singles ===
Year	Title	Production credit	Ref
2011	When You Love Someone feat Trigmatic	Zapp Mallet	
2013	Baby Take Good Care feat Queen Ifrica	Joe Amoah	
2015	Thinking Out Loud (Ed Sheeran Cover)	Dean Fraser	
2015	Gimme The Roots	Reggae Rock Riddim	
2015	Beautiful Virgo	Uptown Girl Riddim	
2016	Hello (Adele Reggae Cover)	Big Hills Band	
2016	Twerk It	Genius Selection	
2016	Killa Machine feat Jupitar & Obibini	Genius Selection	
2017	A 1000 Ways	Reggae Fest Riddim	
2017	You feat Feli Nuna	Knii Lante & Genius Selection	
2017	Champion	Dat BeatGod	
Open Mic feat Flowking Stone	Knii Lante & Genius Selection		

=== Albums ===
Year	Title	Number of Tracks	Ref
2012	Love & Revolution	16	
2014	True Feelings	12	
