= Kwesi Brew =

Ghanaian poet and businessman

- Born: Osborne Henry Kwesi Brew; 27 May 1928; Cape Coast, Gold Coast
- Died: 30 July 2007 (aged 79)
- Education: University College of the Gold Coast
- Occupations: Poet and businessman

Osborne Henry Kwesi Brew (27 May 1928 – 30 July 2007) was a Ghanaian poet and diplomat.

== Biography ==
Brew was born in Cape Coast, Ghana, to a Fante family in 1928. He was brought up by a British guardian—education officer, K. J. Dickens—after his parents died.

He was one of the first graduates from the University College of the Gold Coast in 1951. While still a student, Brew participated in college literary activities and experimented with prose, poetry, and drama. After graduation he won a British Council poetry competition in Accra, and his poems appeared in the Ghanaian literary journal Okyeame, as well as several important African anthologies. Shadows of Laughter (1968), a collection of his best early poems, reveals a thematic interest unusual for a Ghanaian poet: the value of the individual compared with that of society as a whole. In poems such as "The Executioner's Dream", which views with something like horror some of the rituals of traditional Ghanaian society, he suggests that society, in an attempt to purge itself of the ills of life, robs the individual of dignity. African Panorama and Other Poems (1981) draws upon the sights and sounds of rural and urban Ghana. In his collection Return of No Return (1995), he pays tribute to the American writer Maya Angelou and to Ghanaians who may have helped reshape his Eurocentric views into Afrocentric ones.

Brew was published in Okyeame, and four of his poems were included in the 1958 anthology Voices of Ghana. His first published collection, The Shadows of Laughter (1968), was divided into five thematic sections: "Passing Souls" (on death); "Today, We Look at Each Other"; "The Moment of Our Life" (nature); "A Plea for Mercy" (the supernatural); and "Questions of Our Time". His poetry has been characterized as "the poetry of statement and situation".

== Works ==
- The Shadows of Laughter, London: Longman, 1968.
- African Panorama and Other Poems, 1981.
- Return of No Return and other poems, 1995.
- The Clan of the Leopard and other poems, 1996.
