= Geormbeeyi Adali-Mortty =

Ghanaian poet and writer (born 1916)

Geormbeeyi Adali-Mortty (born 16 June 1916) is a Ghanaian poet, writer and literary commentator. He was among the contributors to the pioneering anthology Voices of Ghana: Literary Contributions to the Ghana Broadcasting System, 1955–57 (1958), one of the earliest collections of modern Ghanaian writing. In 1958, he joined the advisory committee of the international literary journal Black Orpheus, and later co-edited Messages: Poems from Ghana (1971) with Kofi Awoonor, an anthology published in the African Writers Series.

== Early life and education ==
Adali-Mortty was born on 16 June 1916. He obtained Teacher's Certificate A from Prince of Wales College, Achimota, in 1935. In 1961, while serving at the University of Ghana, Legon, he received a Rockefeller Foundation study award in Business Administration for further study in the United States.(Rockefeller Foundation Annual Report (1961),Pg.186)

== Career ==
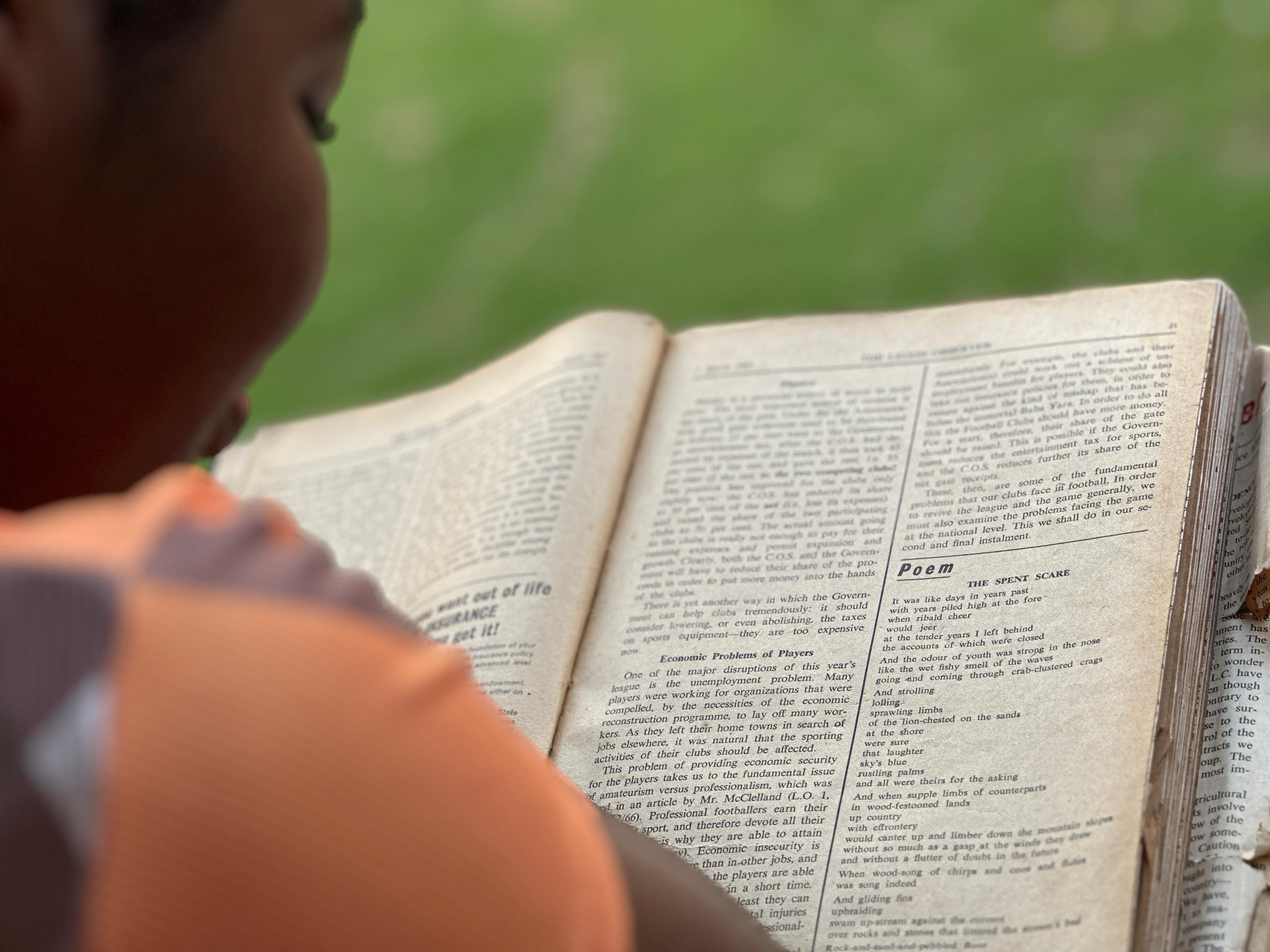
A reader viewing Geormbeeyi Adali-Mortty's poem The Spent Scare in the 3 March 1967 issue of The Legon Observer.

In 1958, he joined the advisory committee of the international literary journal that promoted African literature criticism. Black Orpheus. Adali-Mortty was also a contributor to the 1958 anthology Voices of Ghana: Literary Contributions to the Ghana Broadcasting System, 1955–57, edited by Henry Swanzy, and contributed both poetry and political commentary to the Legon Observer: for example, "The Spent Scare" (1967) was written in response to the coup that ended Nkrumah's rule.

Adali-Mortty later served as Special Commissioner for Redeployment of Labour. He subsequently became a Lecturer in Human Resources at the University of Ghana, where he continued to contribute to literary and intellectual discourse. (ERIC Document ED063107,Pg.5) In 1971, Adali-Mortty co-edited Messages: Poems from Ghana with Kofi Awoonor as part of Heinemann's African Writers Series. African Writers Series,(Google Books).

== Works ==
The following table lists published works by Geormbeeyi Adali-Mortty.

Year	Title	Type	Role
1958	Voices of Ghana: Literary Contributions to the Ghana Broadcasting System, 1955–57	Anthology	Contributor
1958	"Ewe Poetry"	Essay	Author
1967	"The Spent Scare" (Black Orpheus, No. 4 (1958), 36-45)	Poem	Author
1971	Messages: Poems from Ghana (African Writers Series 42)	Anthology	Co-editor (with Kofi Awoonor)
1974	"Change of Government to the Spoils System Again?" (The Legon Observer 9: 4 (1974))	Essay	Author
1974	"Reply to Kwabena Manu's Rejoinder to 'Change of Government to the Spoils System Again?'' (The Legon Observer, 9:6 (1974), p. 166)	Essay	
