= Henry Swanzy =

Anglo-Irish radio producer (1915–2004)

- Born: Henry Valentine Leonard Swanzy; 14 June 1915; Glanmire Rectory, near Cork, Ireland
- Died: 19 March 2004 (aged 88); Bishop's Stortford, England
- Education: Wellington College, Berkshire; New College, Oxford
- Occupation: Radio producer
- Known for: Producer of BBC programme Caribbean Voices

Henry Swanzy (14 June 1915 – 19 March 2004) was an Anglo-Irish radio producer in Britain's BBC General Overseas Service who is best known for his role in promoting West Indian literature particularly through the programme Caribbean Voices, where in 1946 he took over from Una Marson, the programme's first producer. Swanzy introduced unpublished writers and continued the magazine programme "with energy, critical insight and generosity". It is widely acknowledged that "his influence on the development of Caribbean literature has been tremendous".

== Biography ==
Born Henry Valentine Leonard Swanzy at Glanmire Rectory, near Cork in Ireland, he was the eldest son of the local clergyman and his wife. After his father's death in 1920, the five-year-old Swanzy moved to England with his mother.

He was educated at preparatory schools in Cheltenham and Eastbourne, before going on to Wellington College in 1928. He read History at New College, Oxford, graduating with a first-class honours degree, and he also won the Gibbs Prize. For a year thereafter, planning a career as a civil servant, he studied French and German and travelled throughout Europe, then in 1937, aged 22, he was employed at the Colonial and Dominions Office, joining the BBC four years later.

== Broadcasting career and Caribbean Voices ==
Swanzy began working for the BBC during the war, reporting for the General Overseas Service. From 1944 to 1954, he was also an innovative editor of African Affairs, the journal of the Royal African Society, where he introduced African authors and opinion to the colonial mix. He took over Caribbean Voices after Una Marson, the programme's original architect and first producer, returned to Jamaica in April 1946, and he remained at the helm until 1954.

Anne Spry Rush has written of Swanzy having "a great respect for Caribbean writers as representing a legitimate and distinctive element of British literature." Writing in Caribbean Quarterly in 1949, Swanzy commented: "It is not inconceivable that of all the English-speaking world, the West Indies may be revealed as the place most suited for maintenance of a literary tradition." In collaboration with Frank Collymore of BIM magazine, he provided a platform through the programme for some of the most significant Caribbean literary talent of the twentieth century. As Montague Kobbe has written: "it is hard to overemphasise the tremendous influence which Henry Swanzy, editor to Caribbean Voices from 1946 onwards, would exert in the development of a literary tradition that was in its earliest stages. The other initiative in question corresponds, of course, to the emergence of Frank Collymore's audacious magazine, BIM. Launched in Barbados in 1942, BIM encouraged young local writers to put forward their work and quickly established a fruitful rapport with the literary findings uncovered by Swanzy's Caribbean Voices, establishing a cultural infrastructure of sorts that had its local nucleus in Collymore’s magazine and its international outlet in the BBC."

Swanzy is acknowledged to have "transformed Caribbean Voices into the primary site for new and unpublished poetry and prose from the Caribbean, granting an international forum to many who would go on to become the leading lights in Caribbean letters". Writers who received their start on Caribbean Voices or were nurtured as contributors by the programme during Swanzy's tenure include George Lamming, Edgar Mittelholzer, Shake Keane, Sam Selvon, Edward Kamau Brathwaite, Austin Clarke, Ian McDonald, Gloria Escoffery, John Figueroa, Alfred Mendes Derek Walcott and V. S. Naipaul. According to Naipaul, Swanzy brought to the programme "standards and enthusiasm. He took local writing seriously and lifted it above the local". Lamming in his 1960 book The Pleasures of Exile paid tribute to Swanzy's role in sustaining the work of such writers:

"From Barbados, Trinidad, Jamaica and other islands, poems and short stories were sent to England.... Our sole fortune now was that it was Henry Swanzy who produced 'Caribbean Voices.' At one time or another, in one way or another, all the West Indian novelists have benefited from his work and his generosity of feeling. For Swanzy was very down to earth. If you looked a little thin in the face, he would assume that there might have been a minor famine on, and without in any way offending your pride, he would make some arrangement for you to earn. Since he would not promise to 'use' anything you had written, he would arrange for you to earn by employing you to read. No comprehensive account of writing in the British Caribbean during the last decade could be written without considering his whole achievement and his role in the emergence of the West Indian novel."

In 1956, Swanzy himself wrote about what the programme had achieved:

"The listener has visited every kind of home in town and village, sat with the fishermen hefting sea-eggs, gone with the pork-knockers into Guiana jungles, followed the saga-boys and the whe-whe players, heard the riddles, the digging songs, the proverbs, the ghost stories, duppies, la Diablesse, Soukiyans, zombies, maljo, obeah, voodoo, shango. He has agonised over the waifs, the unemployed, the mental patients, scoundrels, fallen women, the rich and comfortable in their wall of privilege."

== 1954–58 in Ghana ==
From 1954 to 1958 Swanzy was seconded as head of programmes to the Gold Coast Broadcasting System (GCBS; later the Ghana Broadcasting Corporation), after a colonial government commission had proposed the establishment of GCBS to produce programmes of local content "in the spirit of independence", with BBC staff being sent to Accra, capital of the then Gold Coast, to develop news and entertainment programmes, train staff and promote the purchase of wireless sets by the general public. Developing a new weekly literary radio programme called The Singing Net, Swanzy specifically encouraged creative writers (Cameron Duodu has written of his experience at the time), attracting contributors and listeners through competitions and articles he wrote for the Daily Graphic.

A direct legacy of the programme was an anthology edited by Swanzy, published the year after Ghana became the first African nation to declare independence from European colonisation, and entitled Voices of Ghana: Literary Contributions to the Ghana Broadcasting System, 1955–57 (Ministry of Information and Broadcasting, Ghana, 1958). In a review for the Daily Times of Nigeria, Cyprian Ekwensi wrote: "I am certain that everyone who reads Voices of Ghana will agree that it stands as a solid examination of the achievement of a nation under the inspiration of a man who knew the importance to a nation of the (literary) printed word."

During this period, he also wrote about the Swanzy family's historical connections with the Gold Coast.

== Later years ==
Swanzy subsequently returned to the BBC's external services, where he worked until his retirement in 1976. He wrote several critiques of West Indian literature and for a decade edited the journal of the Royal African Society, now called African Affairs.

In November 1998, Swanzy was the subject of a BBC Radio 4 programme, What Does Mr Swanzy Want?, presented by Philip Nanton and produced by Matt Thompson.

Swanzy died on 19 March 2004, aged 88, at his home in Bishop's Stortford, England.

== Personal life ==
On 12 March 1946 at Hampstead register office, Swanzy married the artist Tirzah Garwood (1908 -1951), widow of Eric Ravilious, and mother of three children. They had met in 1944 through artist Peggy Angus and rented a house at 169 Adelaide Road, Hampstead after their marriage.

After Garwood died from cancer, in 1952 he married Henriette Van Eeghan, with whom he had two sons and a daughter.

== Legacy ==
In his honour, the Henry Swanzy Award for Distinguished Service to Caribbean Letters was announced by the NGC Bocas Lit Fest in 2013, as an "annual lifetime achievement award to recognise service to Caribbean literature by editors, publishers, critics, broadcasters, and others". Recipients have been: John La Rose and Sarah White of New Beacon Books (2013); literary critics Kenneth Ramchand and Gordon Rohlehr (2014); publisher and editor Margaret Busby (2015), Jeremy Poynting, founder of Peepal Tree Press (2016), Joan Dayal, proprietor of Paper Based Books (2017), and Anne Walmsley, writer, editor, and researcher (2018).

A Postcolonial Studies seminar entitled "Henry Swanzy at the BBC: World Literature and Broadcast Culture at the End of Empire" was conducted at King's College, London University, by Dr Chris Campbell of the University of Warwick on 12 February 2013.

== Archives ==
- Swanzy's papers are held at the Bodleian Library of Commonwealth and African Studies at Rhodes House.
- Copies of correspondence (1945–53) between Swanzy and various authors connected with Caribbean Voices is held by the Alma Jordan Library, University of the West Indies, St. Augustine, Trinidad and Tobago.
- Swanzy's BBC scripts are held by BBC Written Archives at Caversham, near Reading.Papers of Henry Swanzy are held at the Cadbury Research Library, University of Birmingham.

== Selected publications ==
- "Caribbean Voices: Prolegomena to a West Indian Culture", Caribbean Quarterly, Vol. 1, No. 2 (July August September 1949), pp. 21–28.
- "Writing in the British Caribbean: A Study in Cultural Devolution", Overdrup win de West Indisches gids, 32.4: 217–40 ('s Gravenhage: M. Nijhoff), 1952.
- "A Trading Family in the Nineteenth Century Gold Coast", Transactions of the Gold Coast & Togoland Historical Society, Vol. 2, No. 2 (1956), pp. 87–120.
- Editor, Voices of Ghana: Literary Contributions to the Ghana Broadcasting System, 1955–57, Ghana Ministry of Information and Broadcasting, 1958.
