= David Diop =

Senegalese poet (1927–1960)

- Born: July 9, 1927; Bordeaux
- Died: August 29, 1960 (aged 33)
- Occupations: Politician; Poet

David Mandessi Diop (9 July 1927 – 29 August 1960) was a French West African poet known for his contribution to the Négritude literary movement. His work reflects his anti-colonial stance.

== Biography ==
Diop was the son of Maria Mandessi Bell (1896–1990), a member of the Cameroonian Bell family, of which Rudolf Duala Manga Bell and Ndumbe Lobe Bell, both kings of the Duala people, were also members. He started writing poems while he was still in school, and his poems started appearing in Présence Africaine since he was just 15. Diop lived his life transitioning constantly between France and South West Africa, from childhood onwards. While in Paris, Diop became a prominent figure in Négritude literature. His work is seen as a condemnation of colonialism, and detest towards colonial rule. Like many Négritude authors of the time, Diop hoped for a free and independent Africa. Within the movement he was recognized as "the voice of the people without voice".

He died in the crash of Air France Flight 343 in the Atlantic Ocean off Dakar, Senegal, at the age of 33 on 29 August 1960. His one small collection of poetry, Coups de pilon, came out from Présence Africaine in 1956; it was posthumously published in English as Hammer Blows, translated and edited by Simon Mondo and Frank Jones (African Writers Series, 1975).

The Prix David Diop is awarded in his honour by the Association des écrivains du Sénégal. Winners have included Pulchérie Abeme Nkoghe, Papa Ibnou Sarr, and Aïcha Diarra.

== See also ==
- The Renegade (poem)
