= List of African novelists =

This is a list of novelists from Africa, including those associated with as well as born in specified countries.

== A ==
- Chris Abani (born 1966), Nigeria
- P. A. K. Aboagye (1925–2001), Ghana
- Peter Abrahams (1919–2017), South Africa
- Nana Achampong (born 1964), Ghana
- Chinua Achebe (1930–2013), Nigeria
- Ayọ̀bámi Adébáyọ̀ (born 1988), Nigeria
- Bayo Adebowale (born 1944), Nigeria
- Sade Adeniran (born 1960s), Nigeria
- Chimamanda Ngozi Adichie (born 1977), Nigeria
- Maxamed Daahir Afrax (living), Somalia
- Jeannette D. Ahonsou (born 1954), Togo
- Ama Ata Aidoo (1940–2023), Ghana
- Zaynab Alkali (born 1950), Nigeria
- T. M. Aluko (1918–2010), Nigeria
- Elechi Amadi (1934–2016), Nigeria
- David Ananou (1917–2000), Togo
- Kwame Anthony Appiah (born 1954), Ghana
- Lesley Nneka Arimah (born 1983), Nigeria
- Ayi Kwei Armah (born 1939), Ghana
- Khadambi Asalache (1935–2006), Kenya
- Bediako Asare (born 1930), Ghana
- Mary Ashun (born 1968), Ghana
- Ryad Assani-Razaki (born 1981)
- Sefi Atta (born 1964), Nigeria
- Ayesha Harruna Attah (born 1983), Ghana
- Adaeze Atuegwu (born 1977), Nigeria
- Kofi Awoonor (1935–2013), Ghana

== B ==
- Mariama Bâ (1929–1981), Senegal
- Rotimi Babatunde (living), Nigeria
- Yaba Badoe (born 1954), Ghana
- Elizabeth-Irene Baitie (born 1970)
- Ellen Banda-Aaku (born 1965)
- Biyi Bandele (1967–2022), Nigeria
- A. Igoni Barrett (born 1979), Nigeria
- Empi Baryeh (living), Ghana
- Jackee Budesta Batanda (living), Uganda
- Francis Bebey (1929–2001), Cameroon
- Philip Begho (born 1956), Nigeria
- Sokhna Benga (born 1967), Senegal
- Mongo Beti (1932–2001), Cameroon
- Calixthe Beyala (born 1961), Cameroon
- Olympe Bhêly-Quénum (born 1928), Benin
- John Benibengor Blay (born 1915), Ghana
- Amba Bongo (born 1962), Democratic Republic of the Congo
- Nazi Boni (1909–1969), Burkina Faso
- Tanella Boni (born 1954), Côte d'Ivoire
- André Brink (1935–2015), South Africa
- Ken Bugul (born 1947), Senegal
- NoViolet Bulawayo (born 1981), Zimbabwe
- Akosua Busia (born 1966), Ghana
- Donald Besong (date of birth unknown), Cameroon

== C ==
- J. E. Casely-Hayford (1866–1930), Ghana
- Faarax M. J. Cawl (1937–1991), Somalia
- Syl Cheney-Coker (born 1945), Sierra Leone
- Panashe Chigumadzi (born 1991), Zimbabwe
- Shadreck Chikoti (born 1979), Malawi
- Brian Chikwava (born 1972), Zimbabwe
- Shimmer Chinodya (born 1957), Zimbabwe
- Paulina Chiziane (born 1955), Mozambique
- J. M. Coetzee (born 1940), South Africa
- Teju Cole (born 1975), Nigeria
- Félix Couchoro (1900–1968), Togo
- Mia Couto (born 1955), Mozambique
- Chie Chigwedere (born 2006), Zimbabwe

== D ==
- Bernard Binlin Dadié (1916–2019), Côte d'Ivoire
- Tsitsi Dangarembga (born 1959), Zimbabwe
- Amma Darko (born 1956), Ghana
- Lawrence Darmani (living), Ghana
- Nadia Davids (born 1977), South Africa
- Aïda Mady Diallo (living), Mali
- Ebou Dibba (1943–2000), The Gambia
- Jude Dibia (born 1975), Nigeria
- Boubacar Boris Diop (born 1946), Senegal
- Mbella Sonne Dipoko (1936–2009)
- Waris Dirie (born 1965)
- Amu Djoleto (born 1929), Ghana
- Richard Dogbeh (1932–2003), Benin/Senegal/Ivory Coast
- Emmanuel Dongala (born 1941), Republic of the Congo
- Cameron Duodu (born 1937), Ghana

== E ==
- Kossi Efoui (born 1962), Togo
- Obi Egbuna (1938–2014), Nigeria
- Christiane Akoua Ekue (born 1954), Togo
- Cyprian Ekwensi (1921–2007), Nigeria
- Mohammad Elsannour (living), Egypt
- Buchi Emecheta (1944–2017), Nigeria
- Rosemary Esehagu (born 1981), Nigeria

== F ==
- Daniel O. Fagunwa (1903–1963), Nigeria
- Nuruddin Farah (born 1945), Somalia
- Adélaïde Fassinou (born 1955), Benin
- Aminatta Forna (born 1964), Sierra Leone
- Bilkisu Funtuwa (living), Nigeria

== G ==
- Clifton Gachagua (born 1987), Kenya
- Petina Gappah (born 1971), Zimbabwe
- Hawa Jande Golakai (born 1979), Liberia
- Nadine Gordimer (1923–2014), South Africa
- Abdulrazak Gurnah (born 1948), Tanzania
- Yaa Gyasi (born 1989), Ghana

== H ==
- Helon Habila (born 1967), Nigeria
- Beyene Haile (1941-2012), Eritrea
- Bessie Head (1937–1986), South Africa/Botswana
- Chenjerai Hove (1956–2015), Zimbabwe

== I ==
- Abubakar Adam Ibrahim (born 1979), Nigeria
- Emmanuel Iduma (born 1989), Nigeria
- Monique Ilboudo (born 1959) is an author and human rights activist from, Burkina Faso
- Jowhor Ile (born 1980), Nigeria
- Eddie Iroh, Nigeria
- Moses Isegawa (born 1963), Uganda
- Festus Iyayi (born 1947), Nigeria

== J ==
- Dan Jacobson (1929–2014), South Africa
- Sousa Jamba (born 1966), Angola
- Delia Jarrett-Macauley (living), Sierra Leone
- Elnathan John (born 1982), Nigeria

== K ==
- Legson Kayira (died 2012), Malawi
- Fatou Keïta (born 1965), Côte d'Ivoire
- China Keitetsi (born 1976), Uganda
- Euphrase Kezilahabi (1944–2020), Tanzania
- Fred Khumalo (born 1966), South Africa
- Karen King-Aribisala (living), Nigeria
- Asare Konadu (1932–1994), Ghana
- Marie-Christine Koundja (born 1957)
- Ahmadou Kourouma (1927–2003), Côte d'Ivoire
- Benjamin Kwakye (born 1967), Ghana
- Goretti Kyomuhendo (born 1965), Uganda

== L ==
- Alex La Guma (1925–1985), South Africa
- Kojo Laing (born 1946), Ghana
- Mandla Langa (born 1950), South Africa
- Camara Laye (1928–1980), Guinea
- Doris Lessing (1919–2013), South Africa
- Ophelia S. Lewis (born 1961), Liberia
- Werewere Liking (born 1950), Cameroon/Côte d'Ivoire
- Lesley Lokko (living), Ghana

== M ==
- Ignatius Mabasa (born 1971), Zimbabwe
- Lina Magaia (1940–2011), Mozambique
- Arthur Maimane (1932–2005), South Africa
- Barbara Makhalisa (born 1949), Zimbabwe
- Jennifer Nansubuga Makumbi (born 1960s), Uganda
- Charles Mangua (1939–2021), Kenya
- Sarah Ladipo Manyika (living), Nigeria/UK
- Nozipa Maraire (born 1964), Zimbabwe
- Dambudzo Marechera (1952–1987), Zimbabwe
- Zakes Mda (born 1948), South Africa
- Dinaw Mengestu (born 1978), Ethiopia/US
- Maaza Mengiste (born 1971), Ethiopia/US
- Felix Mnthali (born 1933), Malawi
- Thomas Mofolo (1876–1948), Lesotho
- Nadifa Mohamed (born 1981), Somalia
- Nthikeng Mohlele (living), South Africa
- Tierno Monénembo (born 1947), Guinea
- Bai T. Moore (1916–1988), Liberia
- A. S. Mopeli-Paulus (born 1913), Lesotho
- Fiston Mwanza Mujila (born 1981), Congo
- Charles Mungoshi (1947–2019)), Zimbabwe
- David Mungoshi (1949–2020), Zimbabwe
- Solomon Mutswairo (1924–2005), Zimbabwe
- Meja Mwangi (1948–2025), Kenya
- Masimba Musodza (born 1976), Zimbabwe

== N ==
- Glaydah Namukasa, Uganda
- Njabulo Ndebele (born 1948), South Africa
- Okey Ndibe (born 1960), Nigeria
- Donato Ndongo-Bidyogo (born 1950), Equatorial Guinea
- Patrice Nganang (born 1970), Cameroon
- Lauretta Ngcobo (1931–2015), South Africa
- Ngũgĩ wa Thiong'o (1938–2025), Kenya
- Mũkoma wa Ngũgĩ (born 1971), Kenya
- Wanjiku wa Ngũgĩ (born 1970s), Kenya
- Rebeka Njau (born 1932), Kenya
- Lewis Nkosi (1936–2010), South Africa
- Jérôme Nouhouaï (born 1973), Benin
- María Nsué Angüe (1945–2017), Equatorial Guinea
- Martina Nwakoby (born 1937), Nigeria
- Nkem Nwankwo (1936–2001), Nigeria
- Flora Nwapa (1931–1993), Nigeria
- Adaobi Tricia Nwaubani (born 1976), Nigeria
- Stanley Nyamfukudza (born 1951), Zimbabwe

== O ==
- Chigozie Obioma (born 1986), Nigeria
- Trifonia Melibea Obono (born 1982), Equatorial Guinea
- Asenath Bole Odaga (1937–2014), Kenya
- Taiwo Odubiyi (born 1965), Nigeria
- Nana Oforiatta Ayim (living), Ghana
- Margaret Ogola (1958–2011), Kenya
- Grace Ogot (1930–2015), Kenya
- Gabriel Okara (1921–2019), Nigeria
- Irenosen Okojie (living), Nigeria
- Nnedi Okorafor (born 1974), Nigeria/US
- Ifeoma Okoye (born 1937?), Nigeria
- Chinelo Okparanta (born 1981)
- Isidore Okpewho (1941–2016), Nigeria
- Ben Okri (born 1959), Nigeria
- Ukamaka Olisakwe (born 1982), Nigeria
- Kole Omotoso (1943–2023), Nigeria
- Yewande Omotoso (born 1980), South African/Nigeria
- Ondjaki (born 1977), Angola
- Chibundu Onuzo (born 1991), Nigeria
- Yambo Ouologuem (1940–2017), Mali
- Helen Ovbiagele (born 1944), Nigeria
- Yvonne Adhiambo Owuor (born 1968), Kenya
- Ferdinand Oyono (1929–2010), Cameroon
- Kachi A. Ozumba (living), Nigeria
- Ayodele Olofintuade (Living), Nigeria

== P ==
- Nii Ayikwei Parkes (born 1974), Ghana
- Alan Paton (1903–1988), South Africa
- Pepetela (born 1941), Angola
- Lenrie Peters (1932–2009), Gambia
- Olúmìdé Pópóọlá (living), Nigeria/Germany
- Tolulope Popoola (living), Nigeria

== Q ==
- Kwei Quartey (living), Ghana/US

== R ==
- Angèle Ntyugwetondo Rawiri (1954–2010), Gabon
- Richard Rive (1931–1989), South Africa
- Henrietta Rose-Innes (born 1971), South Africa
- David Rubadiri (1930–2018), Malawi
- Bonwell Kadyankena Rodgers (born 1991), Malawi

== S ==
- Stanlake Samkange (1922–1988), Zimbabwe
- Williams Sassine (1944–1997), Guinea
- Kobina Sekyi (1892–1956), Ghana
- Taiye Selasi (born 1979), Ghana/Nigeria
- Francis Selormey (1927–1983), Ghana
- Namwali Serpell (born 1980), Zambia
- Tendai M. Shaba (born 1989), Malawi
- Abdi Sheik Abdi (born 1942), Somalia
- Vamba Sherif (born 1973), Liberia
- Lola Shoneyin (born 1974), Nigeria
- Gillian Slovo (born 1952), South Africa
- Aminata Sow Fall (born 1941), Senegal
- Wole Soyinka (born 1934), Nigeria

== T ==
- Véronique Tadjo (born 1955), Côte d'Ivoire
- Sony Lab'ou Tansi (1947–1995), Democratic Republic of the Congo
- Miriam Tlali (1933–2017), South Africa
- Amos Tutuola (1920–1997), Nigeria

== U ==
- Gracy Ukala (born 1946), Nigeria
- Adaora Lily Ulasi (born 1932), Nigeria
- Rems Umeasiegbu (born 1943), Nigeria
- Chika Unigwe (born 1974), Nigeria

== V ==
- Yvonne Vera (1964–2005), Zimbabwe
- Abraham Verghese (born 1955)
- José Luandino Vieira (born 1935), Angola

== W ==
- Charity Waciuma (born 1936), Kenya
- Timothy Wangusa (born 1942), Uganda
- Zukiswa Wanner (born 1976), South Africa
- Mary Watson (born 1975), South Africa
- Myne Whitman (born 1977), Nigeria
- Zoë Wicomb (1948–2025), South Africa

== Y ==
- Adrienne Yabouza (born 1965), Central African Republic
- Balaraba Ramat Yakubu (born 1959), Nigeria

== Z ==
- Paul Tiyambe Zeleza (born 1955), Malawi
- Norbert Zongo (1949–1998), Burkina Faso
