= List of Ghanaian writers =

This is a list of Ghanaian writers.

== A ==
- Joseph Wilfred Abruquah (1920–1997), novelist^{[Gikandi]} ^{[Jahn]} ^{[Killam & Rowe]}
- Geormbeeyi Adali-Mortty (1916–), poet
- Kobena Eyi Acquah (1952–), poet^{[Killam & Rowe]}
- Kofi Acquah-Dadzie (1939–), jurist, and writer
- Francis Agbodeka (1931–2005), academic and writer
- Jot Agyeman (1967–), media practitioner
- Ivor Agyeman-Duah (1966–), academic, writer, editor and film director
- Ama Ata Aidoo (1940–2023), playwright, poet, fiction writer and critic^{[Gikandi]} ^{[Killam & Rowe]}
- Kofi Akpabli (1973–), journalist, publisher, and travel writer.
- Kofi Aidoo (1950–), short story writer
- Mohammed Naseehu Ali (1971–), short story and non-fiction writer
- Joseph Godson Amamoo (1931–), journalist and author
- Anton Wilhelm Amo (c.1703–c.1759), philosopher^{[Jahn]}
- T. E. Anin (living), economist and author
- Kofi Anyidoho (1947–), poet and academic^{[Gikandi]} ^{[Killam & Rowe]}
- Anthony Appiah (1954–), philosopher, cultural theorist and novelist
- Ayi Kwei Armah (1939–), novelist^{[Gikandi]} ^{[Jahn]} ^{[Killam & Rowe]}
- T. Q. Armar (1915–2000), publisher and textbook writer
- Raphael Armattoe (1913–1953), poet^{[Jahn]} ^{[Killam & Rowe]}
- Portia Arthur (1990–), author, writer and reporter
- Bediako Asare (1930–), journalist and non-fiction writer also connected with Tanzania
- Meshack Asare (1945–), children's writer
- Yaw Asare (1953–2002), dramatist and director
- Mary Asabea Ashun (1968–), novelist
- Akwasi Bretuo Assensoh (1946–), journalist and historian
- Ayesha Harruna Attah (1983–), novelist
- Kofi Awoonor (1935–2013), poet, novelist and critic^{[Jahn]} ^{[Killam & Rowe]}
- Nana Oforiatta Ayim (living), novelist and art historian
- Anthony Osarfo, screenwriter
- Jamuel Yaw Asare (living), poet, playwright and novelist (British Ghanaian)

== B ==
- Adwoa Badoe, dancer and Kwame author
- Yaba Badoe (1954–), novelist and filmmaker
- Elizabeth-Irene Baitie (1970–), writer of fiction for young adults.
- Kofi Batsa (1931–1991)
- Mohammed Ben-Abdallah (1944–), playwright^{[Killam & Rowe]}
- J. Benibengor Blay (1915–?), popular novelist, playwright and poet^{[Jahn]} ^{[Killam & Rowe]}
- William Boyd (1952–), novelist
- Kwesi Brew (1928–2007), poet^{[Gikandi]} ^{[Killam & Rowe]}
- Nana Ekua Brew-Hammond, journalist, poet, playwright and screenwriter
- Roseanne A. Brown (1995–), journalist and novelist.
- Margaret Busby (1944–), publisher, editor and dramatist
- Abena Busia (1953–), poet and academic
- Akosua Busia (1966–), actress, novelist and screenwriter
- Empi Baryeh, novelist
- Boakye D. Alpha, writer, editor, filmmaker, and critic

== C ==
- Jacobus Capitein (1717–1747), minister and writer on slavery^{[Gikandi]} ^{[Jahn]}
- Adelaide Smith Casely-Hayford (1868–1960), short story writer and educator^{[Gikandi]}
- Gladys May Casely-Hayford (1901–1950), poet^{[Gikandi]} ^{[Jahn]}
- Gus Casely-Hayford (1964–), cultural historian
- J. E. Casely-Hayford (1866–1930), politician and novelist^{[Gikandi]} ^{[Jahn]} ^{[Killam & Rowe]}
- Jojo Cobbinah (1948–)
- Rita Akoto Coker (1953–), African romance novelist^{[Killam & Rowe]}
- Quobna Ottobah Cugoano (1757?–1801?), freed slave and autobiographer^{[Gikandi]} ^{[Jahn]} ^{[Killam & Rowe]}

== D ==
- J. B. Danquah (1895–1965), scholar, lawyer and politician^{[Gikandi]} ^{[Jahn]}
- Mabel Dove Danquah (1910–1984), short story writer and journalist^{[Gikandi]}
- Meri Nana-Ama Danquah (1967–), editor, journalist, memoirist
- Amma Darko (1956–), novelist
- Nana Awere Damoah (1975–), author, poet and non-fiction writer
- Lawrence Darmani (1956–), novelist, poet, playwright, inspirational writer
- Kwame Dawes (1962–), poet, critic
- Joe de Graft (1924–1978), playwright and poet^{[Gikandi]} ^{[Killam & Rowe]}
- Michael Dei-Anang (1909–1977), poet, playwright and novelist^{[Gikandi]} ^{[Jahn]} ^{[Killam & Rowe]}
- Amu Djoleto (1929–), novelist, poet and educator^{[Gikandi]} ^{[Jahn]}
- Komla Dumor (1972–2014), journalist
- Cameron Duodu (1937–), journalist, novelist and poet^{[Jahn]} ^{[Killam & Rowe]}
- Dag Heward Mills(1963–), minister, popular author

== F ==
- Ferdinand Kwasi Fiawoo (1891–1969), playwright^{[Jahn]} ^{[Killam & Rowe]}
- Shirley Frimpong-Manso (1977–)

== G ==
- Yaa Gyasi (1989–), novelist

== H ==
- Henneh Kyereh Kwaku
- Manu Herbstein (1936–), novelist
- Dag Heward-Mills (1963–), theologian
- Afua Hirsch (1981–), journalist

== K ==
- Ellis Ayitey Komey (1927–1972), poet and short story writer^{[Jahn]}
- Asare Konadu (1932–1994), novelist^{[Jahn]} ^{[Killam & Rowe]}
- Benjamin Kwakye (1967–), novelist and poet

== L ==
- B. Kojo Laing (1946–2017), novelist and poet^{[Gikandi]} ^{[Killam & Rowe]}
- Lesley Lokko, (1964–), novelist, architect and academic

== M ==
- Tawiah M'carthy, playwright
- John Dramani Mahama (1958–), politician and memoirist
- Bill Okyere Marshall (1936–2021), playwright and novelist^{[Jahn]} ^{[Killam & Rowe]}
- Peace Adzo Medie, writer
- John Atta Mills (1944–2012), politician and legal scholar
- Dayan Kodua, actress and model

== N ==
- Caleb Azumah Nelson (1993/1994–), writer and photographer
- J. H. Kwabena Nketia (1921–2019), ethnomusicologist^{[Jahn]}
- Gamal Nkrumah (1959–), journalist and editor
- Kwame Nkrumah (1909–1972), politician and political theorist^{[Jahn]}

== O ==
- Richard Emmanuel Obeng (1877–1951), novelist and textbook writer
- Nana Oforiatta Ayim, art historian, filmmaker
- (John) Atukwei Okai (1941–2018), poet^{[Gikandi]} ^{[Jahn]} ^{[Killam & Rowe]}
- Kwesi Owusu (1954–2025), author and filmmaker
- Akwasi O. Ofori (1960-) Novelist and Non-Fiction Writer

== P ==
- Frank Kobina Parkes (1932–2005), poet^{[Gikandi]} ^{[Jahn]}
- Nii Ayikwei Parkes (1974–), poet, novelist
- Sharon Dede Padi (1975–2026), poet
- Portia Dery, writer

== Q ==
- Kwei Quartey, physician and writer
- Rex Quartey (1944–2015), writer and poet
- Ato Quayson (1961–), academic and literary critic

== R ==
- Carl Christian Reindorf (1834–1917), pastor and historian^{[Jahn]}

== S ==
- John Mensah Sarbah (1864–1910)
- Cecilia Amoafowaa Sefa (born c. 1983)
- Kobina Sekyi (1892–1956), politician and writer^{[Gikandi]} ^{[Killam & Rowe]}
- Ato Sekyi-Otu (born 1941)
- Taiye Selasi (1979–), novelist
- Francis Selormey (1927–1988), novelist^{[Gikandi]} ^{[Jahn]} ^{[Killam & Rowe]}
- Efua Theodora Sutherland (1924–1996), playwright^{[Gikandi]} ^{[Jahn]} ^{[Killam & Rowe]}
- Nana Sandy Achampong (1964–) novelist, poet and academic

== W ==
- Kwasi Wiredu (1931–2022), philosopher

== Y ==
- Asiedu Yirenkyi (1942–2018), playwright^{[Killam & Rowe]}
- Scofray Nana Yaw Yeboah (1980–), columnist
