= List of Ghanaian novelists =

This is a list of Ghanaian novelists, including writers born in Ghana (formerly the Gold Coast) and those associated with the country.

== A ==
- P. A. K. Aboagye (1925–2001)
- Joseph Wilfred Abruquah (1921–1997)
- Ama Ata Aidoo (1940–2023)
- Kwame Anthony Appiah (born 1954)
- Ayi Kwei Armah (born 1939)
- Bediako Asare (born 1930)
- Mary Ashun (born 1968)
- Ayesha Harruna Attah (born 1983)
- Nana Oforiatta Ayim (living)
- Kofi Awoonor (1935–2013)

== B ==
- Yaba Badoe (born 1955)
- Elizabeth-Irene Baitie (born 1970)
- Empi Baryeh (living)
- Kofi Batsa (1931–1991)
- J. Benibengor Blay (1915– )
- William Boyd (born 1952)
- Roseanne A. Brown (born 1995)
- Akosua Busia (born 1966)

== C ==
- J. E. Casely Hayford (1866–1930)
- Jojo Cobbinah (born 1948)

== D ==
- Meri Nana-Ama Danquah (born 1967)
- Amma Darko (born 1956)
- Lawrence Darmani (born 1956)
- Kwame Dawes (born 1962)
- Amu Djoleto (born 1929)
- Michael Donkor (born 1985)
- Cameron Duodu (born 1937)

== G ==
- Boakyewaa Glover (born 1979)
- Yaa Gyasi (born 1989)

== K ==
- Asare Konadu (1932–1994)
- Benjamin Kwakye (born 1967)

== L ==
- B. Kojo Laing (born 1946)
- Lesley Lokko (born 1964)

== O ==
- Nana Oforiatta Ayim
- Akwasi O. Ofori (1960)

== P ==
- Nii Ayikwei Parkes (born 1974)

== Q ==
- Kwei Quartey

== S ==
- Kobina Sekyi (1892–1956)
- Taiye Selasi (born 1979)
- Francis Selormey (1927–1988)
- Nana Sandy Achampong (born 1964)

== See also ==
- List of Ghanaian writers
