= The Narrow Path =

The Narrow Path may refer to:

- The Narrow Path (novel), a 1966 autobiographical novel by Francis Selormey
- The Narrow Path (1918 film), an American silent drama film
- The Narrow Path (2006 film), a 2006 Nigerian film
- The Narrow Path, a Salem Radio Network christian radio program.
