= Kate Abbam =

Ghanaian journalist, editor and consultant on women and development (1934–2016)

- Born: Ewura Ekua Badoe; 24 October 1934; Cape Coast, Ghana
- Died: May 2016 (aged 81)
- Education: Saint Monica's Convent; Mmofraturo School; A. M. E. Zion School; Wesley Girls' High School; Queen Elizabeth College; University of Ghana, Legon
- Occupations: Journalist, editor and consultant on women and development
- Known for: Founder of Ghana's first women's magazine

Kate Victoria Teiba Abbam, born Ewura Ekua Badoe (24 October 1934 – May 2016) was a Ghanaian journalist, editor and consultant on women and development. Abbam founded Ghana's first women's magazine, Obaa Sima ("The Ideal Woman"), in 1971.

== Life ==
Awura Ekuwa Badoe was born on 24 October 1934 in Cape Coast. She was given a Christian education, and renamed Kate Victoria, at Saint Monica's Convent, Cape Coast, Mmofraturo School in Kumasi, the A. M. E. Zion School in Cape Coast and Wesley Girls' High School in Cape Coast. She won a Ghana government scholarship to read for a degree in Home Science at Queen Elizabeth College in London. She then studied General Science at University of Ghana, Legon. She married Emmanuel Atta Abbam in 1964. From 1964 to 1969 she worked at the Food Research Institute, analysing food and food products.

Kate Abbam founded Obaa Sima as a monthly magazine in 1971. The name, she later explained in an interview, referred to "a woman who is industrious and helps her community... women are called ' obaa sima ' when they have made it through their own efforts – it is the embodiment of the traditional woman". Abbam was owner, editor and principal contributor to the magazine. Her novelette Beloved Twin, for example, was serialized there in 1971–2.

In July 1972, Abbam's husband died, leaving her with small children. She wrote about her treatment as a widow, summarily dispossessed by her husband's family, in Obaa Sima. In 1975 she was awarded a United Nations fellowship to attend the World Conference on Women in Mexico City, reviewing the place of Ghanaian women in the mass media. In 1993, she was enstooled Queenmother of the Anona clan in the Ekumfi Eyisam in the Central Region, making her Nana Assanwa Ewudziwa Gyampaafor II.

She died in May 2016. Her niece is the writer Adwoa Badoe.

== Works ==
- Sweet Deceit
- (as Awura-Ekuwa Badoe) Beloved Twin, Scorpio Books Ghana, 1973
- (as Ekuwa Teima Badoe) I Shall Return: romance from the woods. 1975
