= Aidoo =

Aidoo is a surname. Notable people with the surname include:

- Ama Ata Aidoo (1940–2023), Ghanaian writer
- Fiifi Aidoo (born 1996), Ghanaian-Finnish basketball player
- Jonas Aidoo (born 2002), American basketball player
- Joseph Aidoo (politician) (born 1957), Ghanaian politician
- Joseph Aidoo (Ghanaian footballer) (born 1995), Ghanaian football (soccer) player
- Kofi Aidoo (born 195?), Ghanaian writer
- Kojo Aidoo (born 1978), Canadian football player
- Lawrence Aidoo (born 1982), Ghanaian football (soccer) player
- Paul Evans Aidoo (born 1958), Ghanaian politician
