= Keta Senior High Technical School =

Mixed senior high school in Dzelukope, Volta Region, Ghana

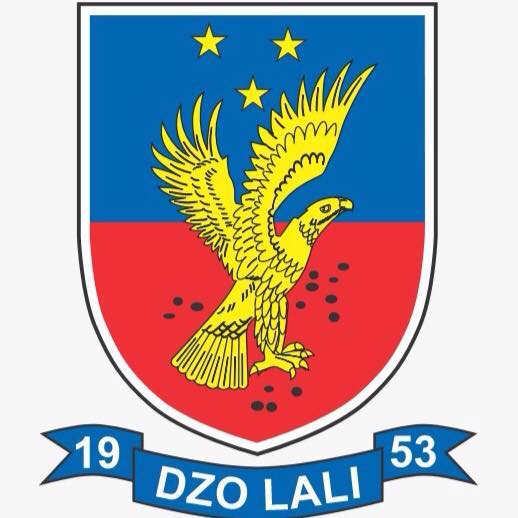

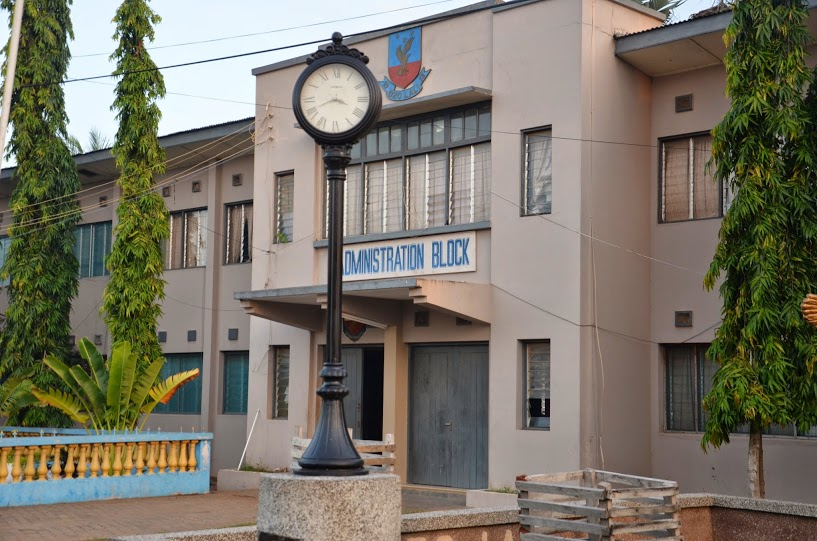
- Administration block

Location
- P.O. Box KW 122; Keta - Dzelukope; Volta Region; Ghana; 5°55′0″N 0°59′0″E

Information
- School type: Public High School
- Motto: Dzo Lali (Fly Now)
- Established: 27 February 1953; 73 years ago
- Founder: Nathan Quao
- Status: Active
- Sister school: Ketasco Basic
- School board: Board of Directors
- School district: Keta Municipal District
- Oversight: Ghana Education Service
- Authorizer: Ministry of Education
- Headmaster: Mr. I.K. Dzidzienyo
- Grades: Forms (1-3)
- Gender: Mixed
- Enrolment: Yearly
- Classes: 71
- Average class size: 50
- Education system: Senior High
- Language: English Language, Ewe (Eʋe or Eʋegbe), French
- Hours in school day: 9
- Houses: Quao; Fiawoo; Abruquah; Kotoka
- Colours: Khaki and Khaki
- Slogan: Now or Never
- Mascot: Eagle
- Website: Ketasco

Keta Senior High Technical School (Ketasco) formerly Keta Secondary School, is a mixed Public Senior High School located at Dzelukope, a town in the Keta Municipal District of the Volta Region, Ghana. The school has a student population of about 3,515 and a teaching staff strength of 150 as at 2020. Ketasco is the biggest school in Volta Region and one of the biggest in Ghana. The motto of the school is DZO LALI with the slogan "Now or Never". The Eagle at the main gate is to remind students to always be like the Eagle.

== History ==
Ketasco was established on 27 February 1953, when some personalities were commissioned to start a day institution that would serve as a catchment school for the hosts of elementary schools scattered all over Keta. The school began in a rented house just opposite the (Kudzawu's House) premises of the present Electricity Company of Ghana at Dzelukope. Ketasco started with Nathan Quao, an educator, civil servant and a diplomat as the Founding Headmaster and twenty-two (22) pioneering pupils. In 1961 the school moved to its present and permanent site.

== Houses ==
There are four houses in the school which cater for males and females with an additional hostel built by the Parent Teachers Association (PTA).The four traditional houses are:

=== Quao ===
Quao is the premier House of Ketasco, named after the first Headmaster of the school, Nathan Quao . It is called House One. The color of the attire of the house is Green, and the Motto is FIRST AMONG EQUALS. It is sited very close to the main gate of the school. It is headed by Housemaster and three House Captains. At the girls' hostel, Quao House has a Housemistress and three House Captains. The same structure is maintained in the three other houses. The Housemaster is Foga Nukunu and the Housemistress Valerie Gogovie.

=== Fiawoo ===
Fiawoo House is also known as House Two. It was named after the first Chairman of the Board of Governors, Late Rev. Dr F. K Fiawoo. The color of the attire of the house is Blue. The Housemaster is headteachers Francis Egbenya, and Housemistress is Ketemepi Imelda.

=== Abruquah ===
The Abruquah House is known as House Three. It was named after the third Headmaster of Ketasco, J. W Abruquah. The color of the attire of the house is Yellow. It is sited very close to the school gate. The Housemaster is headteachers Evance Dzokanda, and the Housemistress is Testimony Agbetum.

=== Kotoka ===
The Kotoka house is also known as House Four and the color of the attire is Red. It was named in honour of Lieutenant General E.K. Kotoka, who led the 1966 Coup d'état. The Housemaster is headteachers Emmanuel Adonu and the Housemistress is Florence Kuwornu.

Note: The Quao and Abruquah houses are also referred to as City while the Kotoka and Fiawoo houses are called Zongo.

PTA HOSTEL

The PTA Hostel is an independent house. It was funded by the PTA (Parent Teacher Association). It is a modern edifice which houses only boys who could not get admission into the traditional houses.

== Achievements ==
- Ketasco won the first runner-up position for the Constitution Game Competition for three (3) times.
- In 2011, Ketasco won the National Constitution Game Competition.
- The school has won the Volta Regional Championship in the Constitution Game for four (4) times.
- Ketasco won the National Human Rights Competition(December 2007) whipping PRESEC Legon in the Semi Finals.
- In 2012, Ketasco won the Montreal Protocol National Quiz Competition organized at Ola Senior High Secondary School.
- In 2014, Ketasco won the Sprite Ball Basketball Competition
- Ketasco won the Regional Project Citizen contest.
- The school has shown class in the National Science and Maths Quiz over the years. In 2017, they ousted a highly rated Opoku Ware School with 52 points as the against 37.
- In 2017, Ketasco won the Silver award at the MTN Ghana App Developer Challenge at the SHS Category.
- In 2018, Ketasco won the Second Runner-Up award at the MTN App Developer Challenge with a Mobile Application called Final Principles.
- In 2021, Ketasco were the first Volta Region school to reach the National Science and Maths Quiz (NSMQ) finals and finished in the third place with a Bronze.
- In 2024, Ketasco succeeded to the National Science and Maths Quiz (NSMQ) finals again as the first Volta Region school to reach the finals twice and finished in the third place.

== Notable alumni ==
- Bernard Ahiafor - Ghanaian MP and 1st Deputy Speaker of the Parliament of Ghana
- Courage Quashigah - Ghanaian Soldier and Minister of State for Agriculture and Health
- Perry Curtis Kwabla Okudzeto - Member of Parliament and Deputy Minister at the Ministry of Youth & Sports
- Lieutenant General Ben Akafia - Chief of Defence Staff of the Ghana Armed Forces
- Jerry Ahmed Shaib - Member of Parliament for Weija-Gbawe Constituency and Second Deputy Minority Whip of the Parliament of Ghana
- Kofi Adjorlolo - Ghanaian actor and producer
- Marricke Kofi Gane - Ghanaian Chartered Accountant and politician

== Former headteachers ==
The table below shows the list headmasters since the school was established and their tenure of office.

Name	Tenure of Office
Nathan Quao	1953–1956
J. W. Abruquah	1957–1963
R. E. K. Matanawui	1963–1970
F. Y. Amuzu	1970–1983
C. K. Mensah	1983–1984
J. A. K. Kaleku	1984–1988
C. K. Mensah	1988–1990
J. Y. Deku	1990–2005
D. O. Gbagbo	2005–2007
D. K. Sedanu-Kwawu	2007–2017
F.C.K Agbakey	2017-2019
I.K. Dzidzienyo	2019–2023
Innocent August	2023–present
