= Forty-Eight Guns for the General =

1976 Nigerian novel

Forty-Eight Guns for the General is a 1976 novel by Nigerian author Eddie Iroh. Published by Heinemann Educational Books Ltd, the narrative is set in the Nigerian Civil War (1967–1970) and focuses on a group of forty-eight mercenaries recruited to the Biafran forces.

== Plot and themes ==
The novel depicts the role and conducts of mercenaries in warfare, portraying them as operating outside conventional military discipline and exploiting the conflict for personal gain. Critical analysis of the work identifies overlapping narratives: one detailing the Biafran experience during the war, and another exploring broader tensions between the country's white minority and black majority. Some scholars suggest that the Biafran struggle is used as a metaphor for the broader post-colonial condition in Nigeria and Africa, with the novel serving as a commentary on neo-colonialism.

== Reception and critical analysis ==
Scholarly analysis places the novel within the corpus of Nigerian literature produced in the decade following the civil war. Critic Tiziana Morosetti notes its dual narrative structure and thematic occupation with neo-colonialism. Chidi Amuta categorizes the work as a detective novel and a war thriller, observing an attempt to blend historical depiction with elements of Western popular entertainment.

Other critiques address the novel’s stylistic and character portrayals. Lamuel Johnson describes the novel as tending towards "elementary and melodramatic" writing. Ngozi Ezenwa-Ohaeto notes that while the novel is filled with depictions of male bravery, its portrayal of female characters is "sporadic, stereotypical and disproportional".
