= Adwoa Badoe =

Ghanaian author and dancer

- Education: Kwame Nkrumah University of Science and Technology
- Occupations: Teacher, Writer and Dancer

Adwoa Badoe is a Ghanaian teacher, writer, and dancer based in Guelph, Canada. Adwoa is an author who focuses on writing for children and young adults. In addition to her literary work, she is a storyteller with experience in creating and producing works for the stage. Her projects include The Griot’s Journey (DVD), Song of Wagadu: Song of Africa (CD), and Fighting For Their Freedom: Richard Pierpoint and the Coloured Company, a work commissioned by the Fort York Museum. She is also an ordained minister and an assisting pastor at the River of Life International Fellowship, Guelph.

== Biography ==
Adwoa was born in Ghana. She studied Human biology at the Kwame Nkrumah University of Science and Technology, and qualified as a doctor. She moved to Canada after her tertiary education in Ghana but was unable to practice as a doctor because she had to study the programme again in Canada to qualify as a doctor in Canada. She subsequently switched attention to her childhood interests, writing and storytelling. She developed her interest in writing as result of her passion to want to share stories she heard growing up. Aside from writing, she attends various cultural festivals around the world. She is also a dance instructor and she organises African dance workshops for schools and libraries in her community. She is the niece of Ghanaian writer, Kate Abbam.

== Works ==
Adwoa has authored many books in her writing career. Her books have been reviewed by newspapers such as the Toronto Star. Some of her works include;

- Crabs for Dinner, (1995);
- The Queen's New Shoes, (1998);
- Street Girls: The Project, (2001);
- The Pot of Wisdom, (2001);
- Nana's Cold Days, (2002);
- Ok to Be Sad, (2005);
- Today Child; Long As There Is Love, (2005);
- Histórias de Ananse, (with Baba Wagué Diakité and Marcelo Pen) (2006);
- Between Sisters, (2012);
- Aluta, (2016).

== See also ==
- List of Ghanaian writers
