= The Son of Umbele =

1973 play by Bill Okyere Marshall

The Son of Umbele is a play written in 1973 by Ghanaian writer Bill Okyere Marshall.

== Synopsis ==
The Son of Umbele is a tragedy played out in front of the home of a fisherman in which the principal character, Joshua, becomes the victim of his own flaws. The play is in three acts. The first act introduces us to the household of Sumako and his children with their sick mother. The second act is about the love affair between Joshua and Duella, at the same time Joshua is beginning to know the son of Sumako. The third act looks at the duel between Benko and Joshua which eventually leads to the latter shooting himself.

== Performance history ==
The play was written while Williams was in the US. Baldwyn W. Burroughs directed the play in 1973 in Ghana (Mohammed ben Abdallah played the lead in that production) and a few months later directed it in the US, at Spelman College. The reviewer for Black World wondered whether a Western audience would ever appreciate the show.
