= Rebel (novel) =

1969 novel by Bediako Asare

- First edition cover
- Author: Bediako Asare
- Language: English
- Genre: Literary fiction
- Publisher: Heinemann
- Publication date: January 1, 1980
- Publication place: Ghana
- Pages: 160
- ISBN: 978-0-435-90059-5

Rebel is a 1969 novel by Ghanaian writer Bediako Asare about the conflict between tradition and modernity in Africa. The novel was published as part of the influential Heinemann African Writers Series.

== Plot ==
Set on an imaginary island off the African coast, it tells the story of the remote village of Pachanga, still unknown to the rest of the island, and the inhabitants who still live a traditional lifestyle, untouched by modern innovations. According to Asare, their existence is far from idyllic. They are governed by a Mzee Matata, a fetish priest, who refuses to allow any innovations to undermine his authority, but after many years of cultivating the same land and fishing the same stream, the soil is overworked, the fish are being rapidly depleted, and the villagers are facing starvation.

Only one villager, Ngurumo, dares to challenge the fetish priest by suggesting that the villagers relocate to a fertile valley on the other side of the jungle. Mzee Matata rejects this idea, arguing that the villagers are suffering because they have displeased the gods. He regards Ngurumo as a threat, and attempts to have him killed during a hunting expedition. When this fails, Ngurumo realizes how dangerous it is for him to remain in the village, and together with his wife Seitu, he sneaks away at night and builds a new life for himself in the valley.

To Mzee Matata, Mgurumo's disappearance and the possibility that he is living well while the rest of the people suffer is a serious challenge to his authority, especially as the people are starving. At a meeting of the entire village, he explains to them that the gods are angry with Pachanga because of Ngurumo and because the villagers have abandoned the ancient practice of human sacrifice. That night, he sends a group of hunters led by Fundi to the valley to bring back Ngurumo and Seitu so that they can be sacrificed and the village spared.

Ngurumo and Seitu are brought back to the village and prepared for sacrifice. As Mzee Matata raises his knife to plunge it into Seitu's belly, there is suddenly a loud pop, and he falls dead to the ground. He was shot by Shabani, a government surveyor, who happened upon the valley by chance just as the ceremony was about to take place. Shabani startles the villagers with his magic stick (his rifle) which can kill a powerful fetish priest at a distance and the many other wonders he shows them. He befriends Ngurumo and begins to prepare him for a new leadership role for the villagers. He is, however, insistent that the choice be made democratically, and that Ngurumo be elected. His chief rival is Fundi, who inherits the role of fetish priest from Mzee Matata.

Ngurumo wins the election and takes a group of men to the valley to build a new villager. Upon their return, they discover that Fundi has attempted a coup: Shabani was killed by a python in a trap set for him by Fundi, and Seitu has been kidnapped and will only be released, according to Fundi, if Ngurumo hands his authority to him. Ngurumo leads another group of men to rescue Seitu just as she is about to be killed, then returns to the village and challenges Fundi to a fight to the death. After winning the struggle, he leads the people to the new village, and plans on sending an expedition across the mountains to the modern people that Shabani described.

== Analysis ==
The plot of Rebel is not sophisticated, and in many instances is reminiscent of colonial works by Rudyard Kipling or H. Rider Haggard, depicting the cruelty of a "primitive" society not yet rescued by the forces of civilization (though in this case, civilization is brought by an African, rather than a white imperialist). In this sense, Asare's book is unusual in African literature in the importance it places on Western civilization and ideas and its disparaging attitude toward traditional African customs. It often tends to preach, particularly when Shabani explains to Ngurumo the benefits of democracy.

It is important as a reflection of Asare's and other African intellectuals' views on how to liberate their countries from colonialism—in fact, the book never mentions where Pachanga is located, and it could be a metaphor for any country in Africa during the post-colonial period. Through this book, Asare seems to say that the best possible future for entire continent lies, not in attempting to revive the ancient tribal past, but in looking to modern ideas and democratic principles, even if this means the complete rejection of long-established traditions.
