= Abruquah =

The name Abruquah constitutes a household name of a highly religious Christian family hailing from the coastal town of Saltpond in the Central Region of Ghana in West Africa. Although Saltponders are Fantis, who are a part of the bigger Akan tribe, the name ABRUQUAH is purported to have its origins from the Akyems who are thought to have migrated from the Eastern "Akyem" Region of Ghana to their present location at the coast, where they integrated well into the Fantis; hence, the other name of Saltpond, Akyemfo, meaning "peapole from Akyem". The name can therefore be found in the Eastern Region of Ghana but spelt differently as ABROKWAH, although these two may share the same ancestry.

== Joseph Wilfred Abruquah ==
One of the renowned sons of the ABRUQUAH genealogy was Joseph Wilfred Abruquah. J. W. Abruquah is probably the most well-known headmaster of Mfantsipim School, the first and oldest second cycle institution in Ghana, then called Gold Coast. He was the headmaster from 1963 to 1970, when The School, as he often referred to Mfantsipim School, rediscovered its pride as the first and best secondary school in Ghana.

As an old student of Mfantsipim, he authored "The Catechist" in 1965 and "The Torrent" in 1968 , and was well known for always correcting his peers that the name is "Mfantsipim School" and not "Mfantsipim Secondary School". He was a father to all his students and most of the current leaders of Ghana who passed through his hands, notably Mohamed Ibn Chambas, still remember him for his motivational speeches.
