= The Narrow Path (novel) =

1966 novel by Francis Selormey

The Narrow Path: An African Childhood
- Title page for The Narrow Path: An African Childhood (1966)
- Author: Francis Selormey
- Language: English
- Genre: Fiction
- Publisher: Heinemann
- Publication date: 1966
- Publication place: Ghana
- Pages: 192
- ISBN: 978-0435905804

The Narrow Path: An African Childhood is a 1966 autobiographical novel by Ghanaian novelist Francis Selormey. The novel was part of Heineman's African Writers Series. The novel heavily focuses on recounting the unhappy and painful experiences of a child, Kofi, attending a Catholic mission school in Ghana, and the contrasting traditional education he receives. The novel, that has many of the developmental features of a bildungsroman, but utilizes an adult narrator to observe the development of the child focal character, Kofi. The novel is also unique because of its focus on the child's' primary education, only retelling the elementary years.

Critic Chris Kwame Awuyah compared the novels themes and structure to Joseph Abruquah's The Torrent (1968) and Amu Djoleto's The Strange Man (1967) and notes similarities to other novels like James T. Farrell's Father and Son and Ngugi Wa Thiag'o's Weep not, Child. Awuyah said that the "major artistic strengths of [the novel] are its direct and concrete language presented with an unreflective and confessional narrative voice".
