= Wife of the Gods =

2009 detective fiction by Kwei Quartey

Wife of the Gods: An Inspector Darko Dawson Mystery
- Author: Kwei Quartey
- Language: English
- Genre: Detective fiction
- Set in: Ghana
- Publisher: Random House
- Publication date: 14 July 2009
- Publication place: United States of America
- Media type: Print
- Pages: 317 pages
- ISBN: 978-1400067596

Wife of the Gods: An Inspector Darko Dawson Mystery is a Ghanaian-American detective novel by doctor and novelist Kwei Quartey. First published in 2009 by Random House, it is his debut novel. Focusing on a detective, Inspector Darko Dawson, as he investigates the murder of a medical student in a remote area of Ghana, the author shows the conflict between scientific medical knowledge and the prominence of traditional healers. Much of the plot focuses on the indentured servants of these "witch doctors", known as the trokosi. The title of the novel comes from a loose translation of that term "wives of the gods".

The novel was written by Quartey, whose mother was African-American and father Ghanaian, having lived in the United States for many years, after spending much of his youth in Ghana. He practices medicine in Pasadena, California, and had only returned to Ghana a year before publishing the novel.

In his review for the Los Angeles Times, Tim Rutten described the novel as having "fluent and realistic" dialogue that is engaging, while also developing compelling "plot, character and an interesting setting". In a write-up for GhanaWeb, Kofi Amenyo described the novel as a "delightful read" but extensively critiqued it as inauthentic, because "Quartey doesn’t really know much about rural life in Ghana" and shows "a peculiar interest (almost an obsession) in the Ghana that appeals to the foreign tourist."
