= Kofi Acquah-Dadzie =

Ghanaian academic, jurist and writer (born 1939)

Justice Kofi Acquah-Dadzie
- Born: Kofi Acquah-Dadzie; 1939 (age 86–87); Juaso, Gold Coast
- Occupations: Academic; Jurist; Writer

Academic background
- Education: Aggrey Memorial A.M.E. Zion Senior High School; Accra Academy
- Alma mater: University of Ghana; Ghana School of Law

Kofi Acquah-Dadzie is a Ghanaian academic, jurist and writer based in Botswana. He was the Assistant Registrar and Master of the High Court of Botswana.

== Early life and education ==
Acquah-Dadzie was born in 1939 at Juaso in the Ashanti Region of Ghana (then Gold Coast). He had his early education at the Juaso Government School where he completed in 1953. He proceeded to Aggrey Memorial A.M.E. Zion Senior High School where he obtained his Ordinary Level certificate in 1958 and the Accra Academy for his Advanced Level certificate which he received in 1964. Acquah-Dadzie subsequently entered the University of Ghana, Legon for his tertiary education. There, he studied law and obtained his LLB in 1968. He then gained admission at the Ghana School of Law where he graduated with his Barrister at Law certificate and qualified as a Solicitor and Barrister of the Supreme Court of Ghana.

== Career ==
Acquah-Dadzie worked as a grade I Magistrate and also served as an acting High Court judge in Koforidua, Ghana. He later left for Nigeria to join the University of Maiduguri staff as a chief tutor-in-law. After teaching in Nigeria for a period of time, Acquah-Dadzie took up an appointment as Senior Magistrate in Palapye, Botswana. He was later elevated to the status of Principal Magistrate, serving in Mahalapye, Botswana. Until his retirement in 2004, he was the Assistant Registrar and Master of the High Court of Botswana.

== Publications ==
Acquah-Dadzie has authored various books mostly focused on law in Botswana and Southern Africa at large. Some of these books include;

- Maintenance of Children and Deserted Wives: (laws of Botswana), (1998);
- World Dictionary of Foreign Expressions: A Resource for Readers and Writers (with Gabriel Adeleye), (1999);
- A Handbook for Prosecutors, (2000);
- The Law and Procedure for the Trial of Rape and Other Common Sexual Offences in Botswana, (2000);
- An Index to Selected Botswana Criminal Cases (1964-2002), (2003);
- The Policeman's Guide to Criminal Law and Evidence in Botswana, (2004);
- A Guide to the Heroes Acre--: Some Basic Facts about Zimbabwe's Heroes and the Heroes Acre, Issues 1-3 (with Micah Cheserem), (2006);
- A Long Night of Regrets: Moral Lessons for the Youth, (2006).
- The Moment to Decide: Breaking the Chain of Sexual Network, (2013)
- A Handbook for Journalists on Court Reporting, (2014)
- The Elements of Botswana Criminal Law Offences, (2015)

== See also ==
- List of Ghanaian writers
