= The Missing American =

2020 mystery novel by Kwei Quartey

- First edition
- Author: Kwei Quartey
- Language: Language
- Genre: Mystery
- Published: January 14, 2020
- Publisher: Soho Press
- Publication place: Ghana
- ISBN: 978-1-64129-212-2 (First edition)

The Missing American is a novel written by Ghanaian-American novelist Kwei Quartey first published in 2020 by Soho Press.
