= Akwasi Bretuo Assensoh =

Ghanaian academic and journalist

Akwasi Bretuo Assensoh is a Ghanaian academic and journalist. He is an emeritus professor of African American and African Diaspora Studies at Indiana University, Bloomington, Indiana.

== Early life and education ==
Assensoh was born on 1 April 1946 at Dunkwa-On-Offin, Gold Coast to Opanin Kwabena and Abena Amoateng. He moved to the United States of America in 1978. He obtained his bachelor's degree in History and Politics from Dillard University in 1981. In 1982, he was awarded his master's degree by the New York University and his doctorate degree in 1984 by the same university.

== Career ==
Assensoh begun as an assistant editor for the Daily Listener, Chronicle, and Digest in Monrovia, Liberia. In 1968, he was promoted to editor, and a year later he was made sub editor of The Pioneer, a newspaper in Kumasi, Ghana. From 1970 to 1972, Assensoh worked as a syndicated columnist for Compass News Features in Luxembourg.

After his completing his doctoral research in 1984, Assensoh was appointed associate professor of History at Dillard University. He worked in this capacity from 1984 to 1988, and in 1986, he doubled as Director of honors programs. He became the assistant editor of King Papers Project and a visiting assistant professor of History at Stanford University in 1988.

== Personal life ==
Assensoh married Irenita Benbow on 19 March 1981. Together, they have two children. He later married Dr. Yvette Alex-Assensoh and together, they have two sons.

== Works ==
- Kwame Nkrumah: Six Years in Exile, 1966-72'", (1978)
- Black Woman: An African Story (novel), (1980)
- Woman : An African Story (novel), (1980)
- Campus Life (three - act play), (1981)
- Africa in Retrospect, (1985)
- Martin Luther King, Jr. and America's Quest for Racial Integration, (1987)
- Kwame Nkrumah of Africa: His Formative Years and the Beginning of His Political Career, 1935-1948, (1989)
- African Political Leadership: Jomo Kenyatta, Kwame Nkrumah, and Julius K. Nyerere, (1998)
- African Military History and Politics: Coups and Ideological Incursions, 1900-Present, (2002)
- Malcolm X: A Biography, (2013)
- Malcolm X and Africa, (2016)

== See also ==
- List of Ghanaian writers
