= Martina Nwakoby =

Nigerian writer (born 1937)

Martina Awele Nwakoby
- Born: 1937 (age 88–89); Ogwashi-Uku, Nigeria
- Education: University of Pittsburgh; University of Ibadan
- Occupation: Writer

Martina Awele Nwakoby (born 1937) is a Nigerian writer.

== Early life and education ==
Martina Nwakoby was born in Ogwashi-Uku and was educated in Niger, in Birmingham, at the University of Pittsburgh and at the University of Ibadan, receiving a PhD in literary studies from the latter institution.

== Career ==
She was described as one of the Nigerian female writers who dare to "challenge the dominant paradigm" in an article preview titled "Nigerian Female Writers: A Critical Perspective" edited by Henrietta C. Otokunefor and Obiageli C. Nwodo in 1989. Nwakoby was on the list of Nigerian women writers whose works have been marginally represented in the nation's literary scene. She was also described as one of Nigeria females to move "into a journey of relevance; a journey of redemption, strongly suspecting woman is under siege of perpetual domination." This made her a devoted feminist and one of the second-generation writers and critics in Nigeria from the 1970s.

She has lectured at Abia State University.

== Achievements ==
Nwakoby won the 1978 Macmillan children's book competition. Her most widely held works were A House Divided, which had three editions that were published between 1985 and 2002 in English and is held by 37 libraries worldwide, and A Lucky Chance, which had four editions published between 1980 and 1983 in English and is held by 18 libraries worldwide.

== Works ==
- Ten in the Family, children's book (1973)
- A Lucky Chance, children's book (1980)
- A House Divided, novel (1985)
