= Aggrey Memorial A.M.E. Zion Senior High School =

Location
- P. O. Box 189, Cape Coast, Moree Hill, Ghana
- Coordinates: 5°8′14″N 1°13′11″W

Information
- Type: Public Secondary/High School
- Motto: Semper Optimo Nitere
- Established: 22 January 1940; 86 years ago
- Founder: Dr. A. W. E. Appiah
- Headmistress: Dorothy Hayford
- Staff: 200+
- Grades: Form 1 – Form 3
- Gender: Mixed, Coeducational
- Enrollment: 2,323
- Campus size: Large
- Campus type: Rural
- Houses: Watson; Pinanko; Casford; Enchill; Lucille; Segbefia; Katherine Aikens; New House
- Colors: Mauve and Yellow
- Mascot: Golden Eagle
- Nickname: Bridge City
- Affiliation: African Methodist Episcopal Zion Church
- Anthem: Aggrey Memorial Ode
- Website: www.aggreymemorialshs.com

Aggrey Memorial A.M.E. Zion Senior High School is a publicly supported Coeducational senior high school in Cape Coast, Ghana. It educates students to pass the WASSCE.

== Academics ==
The academic performance of students has always been high compared to that of sister schools. The Ordinary and Advanced Level ('O' and 'A' Level) programmes were respectively phased out in 1994 and 1996 when the government of Ghana introduced the new "Educational Reform Programme" started in 1999. The school currently offers four of five programs that the new system addresses: Agricultural Science, Business, Vocational (Home Economics and Visual Arts), and General (Arts and Science). The only programme that the school does not offer is Technical Programme. In 2001, Out of the total number of 500 candidates the school presented for the West African Senior High School Certificate Examination (WASSCE), 498 passed in five or more subjects out of 499 students who took the examination. The highest-performing student scored 7 A1s and a B2 while three others obtained 7 A1s and a B3.

The school also participates in the Robotics Inspired Science Education (RiSE) Workshop mission that inspires and energizes teachers, middle school, high school and college students in Ghana to pursue education and careers in science, technology, engineering, and mathematics (STEM) by using the motivational effects of robots to connect theory with practice.

== Excellence ==
In 1997, the Senior Secondary Certificate Examinations conducted by the West Africa Examinations Council(WAEC), Aggrey Memorial Zion Secondary School was one of the schools honoured by the council for academic excellence. The school produced the best Agricultural Science Student in this examination.

The school's Information and Communication Technology (ICT) status is very high with a 120 feet transmission mast linked via satellite with AT&T in the US.

The Aggrey Memorial A.M.E. Zion Senior High School undertook a project designed to assemble and fly light aeroplanes in the country in 2010. The project, the first of its kind by an educational institution in Ghana, was in collaboration with the Franklyn College in the United Kingdom and the British Model Flying Association (BMFA).

== Notable alumni ==
- Yaw Darko Asare, active Justice of the Supreme Court of Ghana
- Kofi Acquah-Dadzie, academic and judge
- Kojo Asemanyi, politician
- T. D. Brodie-Mends, politician
- Mustapha Essuman, footballer
- Ken Kanda, Ghanaian representative to the United Nations
- Rose Mensah-Kutin, gender advocate, journalist
- Abrewa Nana, musician
- Yvonne Nelson, actress
- George Brigars Williams, actor
- John Kudalor, former Inspector General of Police
