= Portia Dery =

Ghanaian writer

- Occupation: Author

Portia Dery is a writer from Ghana who is best known for her children's stories but she also writes short stories and poetry. Her works have been published in various magazines, anthologies and platforms, including the UK poetry library, Arts Beat, Africa's first anthology, and the Ayiba magazine.

In 2016, Portia Dery received a fellowship from the Mandela Washington Fellowship for Young African Leaders Initiative and, among other things, developed The Funky Read Write Clinic, a programme for promoting children's reading and writing skills. Since 2013, she has been active in the field of children's literacy, founding the African Youth Writers Organization (AYWO) initiative. At that time, she worked in a rural area of Ghana for the Department of Community Development and Social Welfare covering gender equality, economic fundamentals, literacy and health. Dery was among the runners for the 2016 Queen's Young Leaders Award.

The author won the Children's Africana Book Award for her book, Grandma's List 2018, which honours five children's and teen books on Africa each year. She shares the award with the book's South African illustrator, Toby Newsome. The book tells the story of an eight-year-old girl, Fatima, who wants to help her grandmother. She receives from the grandmother a list of errands, but on losing the list, she tries to remember what was on it. The resulting story was praised as equally funny as heart-warming. The book was published in 2016 by African Bureau Stories. As early as 2014, the manuscript won the Golden Baobab Prize awarded as Best Picture Book manuscript.

Dery is originally from the Upper West Region of Ghana but now lives in Tamale.
