= Joseph Wilfred Abruquah =

Ghanaian novelist and educationist (1921–1997)

- Born: 8 May 1921; Saltpond, Ghana
- Died: 6 November 1997 (aged 76)
- Occupations: Novelist, educator
- Writing career
- Notable works: The Catechist (1965); The Torrent (1968)

Joseph Wilfred Abruquah (8 May 1921 – 6 November 1997) was a Ghanaian novelist and educator.

== Early life and education ==
Abruquah was born on May 8, 1921 in Saltpond. He had his secondary education at Mfantsipim School and his tertiary education at King's College London. He obtained a diploma in Education from Westminster College, London.

== Career ==
Upon his return to the Gold Coast, Abruquah taught at Keta Secondary School. He later succeeded Nathan Quao as Headmaster of the school in 1957. Abruquah held this post until 1963 when he moved to his alma mater Mfantsipim School to serve as the school's Headmaster. Abruquah served as Headmaster of the school until the early 1970s, when he lost that job and moved to the United States, where he became a lecturer in African Literature at the University of Iowa.

Abruquah's first literary publication was The Catechist, an autobiography believed to have highlighted the ill-treatment meted to his father by the missionaries his father served. Abruquah followed this up with another novel entitled The Torrent. It is alleged that Abruquah was working on a third novel when he was relieved of his duties as Headmaster of Mfantsipim School. He consequently lost all interest in writing fictional novels.

== Death ==
Abruquah died on 6 November 1997, at the age of 76.

== Works ==
- The Catechist. G. Allen & Unwin, 1965.
- The Torrent. Longmans, 1968.

== See also ==
- List of Ghanaian writers
