= African Book Publishing Record =

The African Book Publishing Record
- Discipline: Book publishing
- Language: English
- Edited by: Cécile Lomer

Publication details
- History: 1975–present
- Publisher: Walter de Gruyter
- Frequency: Quarterly

Standard abbreviations
- ISO 4: Afr. Book Publ. Rec.

Indexing
- ISSN: 0306-0322 (print); 1865-8717 (web)
- OCLC no.: 239105973

Links
- Journal homepage

The African Book Publishing Record is an academic journal covering new and forthcoming African publications, providing full bibliographic and acquisitions data. It covers works of all levels in the African languages, as well as English, French, and Portuguese, in three indices by subject, country, and author. In addition to its bibliographic coverage, it also includes a book review section, reviews of new journals, and a variety of news, reports, and articles about African book trade activities and developments. The journal was established in 1975 by Hans M. Zell and is now published by Walter de Gruyter. The current editor-in-chief is Cécile Lomer.
