= Jeannette D. Ahonsou =

Togolese novelist (born 1954)

- Born: 1954; Lavie, Togo
- Died: 2022 (aged 67–68); Kpalime, Togo
- Resting place: Lavie, Togo
- Education: University of Benin
- Writing career
- Notable awards: Prix Littéraire France-Togo

Jeannette Délali Ahonsou (born 1954 in Lavie) was a Togolese novelist. She holds an English Degree from the University of Benin (current University of Lomé) and is a retired English instructor.

== Bibliography ==
She writes primarily in French and has published four books, including Une Longue Histoire, which earned her the Prix Littéraire France-Togo in 1995.

- Ahonsou, Jeannette (1999). Une Longue Histoire (in French). Lomé: Editions Akpagnon. ISBN 2-86427-054-4.
- —— (2005). Le Trophee de Cristal (in French). Lomé: Les Editions de la Rose Bleue. ISBN 2-914567-07-3.
- Le Piège à Conviction (2013). Lomé: Editions Awoudy. ISBN 979 10 91011 21 1
- Un Tunnel sans Bout (2015). Lomé: Editions Les Continents. ISBN 9-7829-1870-581-9
