= Ophelia S. Lewis =

Liberian author, publisher, and humanitarian (b. 1961)

Ophelia S. Lewis (born 7 November 1961) is a Liberian author, publisher, and humanitarian.

== Life ==
Ophelia S. Lewis published her first book, titled My Dear Liberia, a memoir of pre-civil war Liberia, in 2004. Next she published a book of poems, a collection of short stories, a series of children's books and a novel. Lewis was an officiating member of the Liberian Writers Network during its formation in 2005. She has been featured in scholarly publications such as Thinking Classroom: An International Journal of Reading, Writing and Critical Reflections and Sea Breeze: A Journal of Contemporary Liberian Writings.

Lewis' writings can be found on several Liberian literary sites. Over the years she has partnered with Liberian organizations such as Women of Fire, L.A.M.A (Liberian Association of Metro Atlanta) and S.H.A.D.E.S of Liberia to rebuild Liberia and its citizens.

== Books ==
- Lewis, Ophelia S. (2004). My Dear Liberia. ISBN 9780975360903.
- — (2007). Journeys (a collection of poems). ISBN 9780975360910.
- — (2011). Heart Men: a novel. ISBN 9780975360965.
- — (2011). The Dowry of Virgins. ISBN 9780975360927.
- — (2012). Montserrado. ISBN 9780985362508.
- — (2015). Liberia Unscrabbled: A game book. ISBN 9780985362560.
- — (2021). Liberia Presidents: 1847-2021. ISBN 9781945408731.
- Osbert, Shabamukama; Lewis, Ophelia S. (2022). What I Can Be When I Grow Up. ISBN 9781945408168.
- Lewis, Ophelia S. (2023). Getting Started with Alphabets & Numbers. ISBN 9781945408168.
- — (2023). Getting Started with Alphabets & Numbers (Teacher ed.). ISBN 9781959580010.

=== Kinder Kollege ===
- Lewis, Ophelia S.; Logan, L. M.; Juah, Patrice (2020). Kinder Kollege Language Arts. ISBN 9781945408298.
- Lewis, Ophelia S.; Logan, L. M.; Juah, Patrice (2020). Kinder Kollege Primary Arithmetic. ISBN 9781945408304.
- Lewis, Ophelia S.; Logan, L. M.; Juah, Patrice (2020). Kinder Kollege Primary Copybook. ISBN 9781945408557.
- Lewis, Ophelia S.; Logan, L. M.; Juah, Patrice (2020). Kinder Kollege Science. ISBN 9781945408311.
- Lewis, Ophelia S.; Logan, L. M.; Juah, Patrice (2020). Kinder Kollege Technology. ISBN 9781945408502.
- Lewis, Ophelia S.; Logan, L. M.; Juah, Patrice (2020). Kinder Kollege Social Studies. ISBN 9781945408519.
- Lewis, Ophelia S.; Logan, L. M.; Juah, Patrice (2020). Kinder Kollege Primary Bible Lessons. ISBN 9781945408564.
