= Dzelukope =

Dzelukope Ʋugazomayi
- Town
- Location in Ghana
- Coordinates: 5°53′0″N 0°59′0″E
- Country: Ghana
- Region: Volta Region
- District: Keta Municipal District

Population
  - Ethnicities: Ewe people
- Time zone: GMT
  - Summer (DST): GMT
- Area code: +233 (3626)

Dzelukope is a town located near Keta in the Volta Region of Ghana.

== Notable Persons ==
- Victoria Agbotui, mother of Jerry John Rawlings, was born in Dzelukope in 1919.

== Education ==
Some notable educational institutions located at Dzelukope:

- Keta Senior High Technical School
- Dzelukope R.C. Basic Schools
- DzeluKope( Evangelical Presbyterian Church ) E.P basic schools
