= Sharon Dede Padi =

Ghanaian artist and poet (1975/1976–2026)

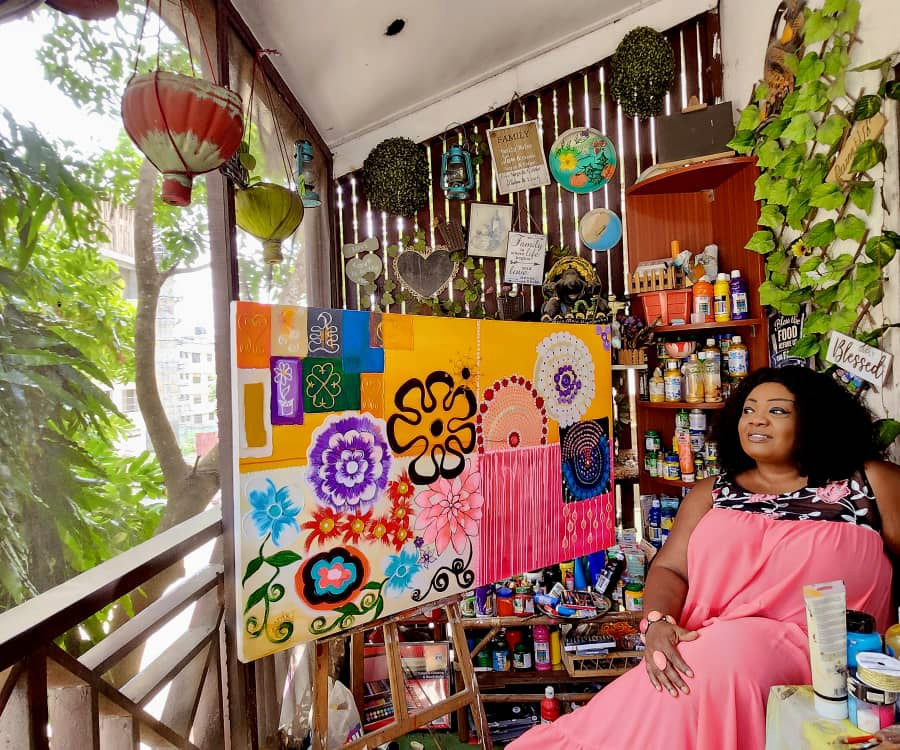
- Padi in 2024
- Born: 1975 or 1976
- Died: 7 July 2026 (aged 50)
- Education: Kwame Nkrumah University of Science and Technology
- Occupations: Painter, poet
- Known for: Art
- Style: Watercolor painting, drawing, acrylic painting
- Awards: Guinness World Records – Sharon Dede Padiki; 2024 Largest Leaf Print Painting – Artist
- Elected: Board of Ghana Digital Centres Limited

Sharon Dede Padi (1975 or 1976 – 7 July 2026) was a Ghanaian painter and poet. She was the first official Guinness World Record holder for the largest leaf print painting, spanning 54.33 square metres (584.8 sq ft).

== Early life and education ==
Sharon Dede Padi was born in 1975 or 1976. She discovered her passion for painting at a young age. She honed her artistic skills while studying architecture engineering at the Kwame Nkrumah University of Science and Technology (KNUST) in Ghana. Despite pursuing a career in architecture, she never lost her love for art and decided to incorporate it into her profession as a pastime.

She also held a master's degree in construction and project management from the London Southbank University.

== Career and advocacy ==
Padi was the CEO of Padiki Art Gallery, where she showcased her artwork and supported other upcoming artists. Her artistic repertoire includes various styles such as watercolor painting, card pasting, and drawing. In recognition of her contributions to the art industry, she was honoured with the Most Outstanding Female in Art award at the feminine Ghana Achievement Awards. In 2022, she was inducted to the board of the Ghana Digital Centers Limited. In 2025, a leaf print painting she created in Accra measuring 54.33 m² was awarded the Guinness World Record for being the largest, with her becoming the first record holder in that category.

Padi was a strong advocate for encouraging young artists and promoting the arts in Ghana. She called on the government of Ghana to pay attention to the Ghanaian art industry, and emphasised the need for affordable materials and a financial support for upcoming artists.

In March 2024, Padi completed a 168-hour painting marathon in an attempt to break the record of longest painting marathon held by Chancellor Ahaghotu.

== Death ==
Sharon Dede Padi died on 7 July 2026, at the age of 50.

== Publications ==
Padi launched her first book, REFLEXIONS, in 2023 and became a classified publisher at the Ghana Library Authority. The book features over 100 paintings from her repertoire, which she transformed into poems. Through her book, she aimed to create mental images of objects, nature, and human activities, showcasing the deep connection between art and poetry and the inherent strength of African women which constitutes a central theme in her work.

== See also ==
- Ama Ata Aidoo
- Kenturah Davis
- Efua Sutherland
