= Nana Awere Damoah =

Ghanaian author

- Born: 3 June 1975 (age 51); Accra, Ghana
- Occupation: Author
- Writing career
- Genres: Fiction, Non-fiction

Nana Awere Damoah (born 3 June 1975, Accra) is a Ghanaian author. He has six books to his credit. Damoah, who is a British Council Chevening alumnus with a master's degree in chemical engineering from the University of Nottingham, works as a Technical Manager in Lagos, Nigeria

== Life ==
Born in Accra, Ghana, Damoah speaks fondly of growing in the suburb of Kotobabi, in the Ghanaian capital, where he started his education at the local Providence Preparatory School from 1979 to 1986. He spent all his secondary school years (1986 to 1993) at Ghana National College, Cape Coast. After leaving secondary school, he got admission at the Kwame Nkrumah University of Science and Technology in Kumasi, in 1994. There, he pursued a bachelor's degree in chemical engineering and completed in 1999. Damoah got a scholarship through the British Council Chevening Programme to do his master's degree in chemical engineering at the University of Nottingham, UK, from 2005 to 2006.

He is an associate of Joyful Way Incorporated, a Christian Music Ministry in Ghana, where he was the group's national president from 2002 to 2004.

Nana Awere Damoah is married to Vivian, with whom he has three children. The couple and their children, Nana Kwame Bassanyin, Nana Yaw Appiah, and Maame Esi Akoah, are based in Tema, Ghana.

He had a friend named Sunday Leonard

== Writing ==
Damoah started writing seriously in 1993 when he was in the sixth form at Ghana National College. He wrote his first creative piece, "A Day in Carthage", in a History class. He has had a number of his short stories published in local Ghanaian newspapers, the Mirror and the Spectator. In 1997, he won the first prize in the Step Magazine National Story Writing Competition with the story "The Written Letter". His writing has appeared in StoryTime ezine, Legon Business Journal, Sentinel Nigeria Magazine and the anthology African Roar (StoryTime Publishing, 2010).

Nana Awere Damoah's writings cannot be classified into a particular genre of writing. According to him, "I just try write and create my own style". His first two books, Excursions in My Mind and Through the Gates of Thought, are mostly autobiographical in nature and he calls them "reflective writing". For his non-fiction writing, he tries to bring a mix of styles – poetry, storytelling and satire. He uses a lot of personal experiences and observations. Tales from Different Tails, his third book, is straightforward fiction; short stories. In that book, he uses local settings and experiments with some traditional Ghanaian by-the-fireside sort of narrative. His last two books, I Speak of Ghana and Sebitically Speaking, he categorizes under travel and historical non-fiction and mostly narratives on Ghana, with a good dose of satire in them as well.

Nana Awere Damoah and his friend, Kofi Akpabli organize quarterly book reading events in various cities in Ghana. This initiative started since 2011.

== Books ==
Nana Awere Damoah is the author of six books; all of which he self-published.

Non-fiction:

- Nsempiisms (2016)
- Sebitically Speaking (2015)
- I Speak of Ghana (2013)
- Through the Gates of Thought (2010)
- Excursions in my Mind (2008)

Fiction:

- A collection of short stories: Tales from Different Tails (2011)].

He has contributed to two anthologies and he keeps personal blogs at www.nanadamoah.com and www.nanaaweredamoah.wordpress.com, and is a columnist on www.infoboxdaily.com.
