= Nathan Quao =

Ghanaian civil servant (1915–2005)

Nathan Anang Quao MV, OSG

Special Assistant to the President
- In office 1993–2001
- President: Jerry Rawlings

Secretary at the PNDC Secretariat
- In office 1984–1993
- President: Jerry Rawlings

Chairman, Ghana Education Service Council
- In office 1974–?
- President: I. Kutu Acheampong
- Preceded by: Position established

Secretary to the National Redemption Council & Head of the Civil Service
- In office 1972–1973
- President: I. Kutu Acheampong
- Preceded by: Position established
- Succeeded by: E.M. Debrah

Secretary to the President
- In office 1970–1972
- President: Edward Akufo-Addo

Secretary to the Presidential Commission & Council of State
- In office 1970–1970

Secretary to the Executive Council of the National Liberation Council
- In office 1969–1970

Deputy Secretary to the National Liberation Council
- In office 1967–1969

Principal Secretary to the Ministry of Foreign Affairs
- In office 1966–1967

Personal details
- Born: 21 November 1915 Adawso, Gold Coast
- Died: 15 February 2005 (aged 89) Accra, Ghana
- Relations: List: Carl Henry Clerk (brother-in-law); Nii Amaa Ollennu (cousin); Amon Nikoi (nephew); Nicholas T. Clerk (nephew); George C. Clerk (nephew)
- Education: Accra Academy; University College of the Gold Coast; University of London (BA, PGCE)
- Occupation: Civil Servant; Diplomat; Educator

Nathan Anang Quao, MV, OSG (21 November 1915 – 15 February 2005) was a Ghanaian statesman and educationist who served as Secretary (Minister) at the PNDC Secretariat from 1984 to 1993 and Special Assistant to President Jerry Rawlings from 1993 to 2001. A career diplomat and civil servant, he retired as Cabinet Secretary and Head of the Civil Service in 1973. Quao was the founding headmaster of Keta Secondary School in 1953 and was appointed the first chairman of the Ghana Education Service Council in 1974.

== Early life and education ==
Quao was born at Adawso in the Eastern Region on 21 November 1915 where his father Daniel James Quao of La was based as a general commodities merchant. His mother was Dinah Naa Densua Addy of Ga-Mashie. His maternal grandfather, Nii Ngleshie Addy I was of royal lineage and the oldest son of Nii Tetteh Tsuru I, the founder and ruler of the Otuopai Clan in Ga Mashie.

After his elementary education at Presbyterian schools, he had his secondary education at Accra Academy from 1932 to 1935. Thereafter, he studied for his Bachelor of Arts degree from the University of London as an external student. He later obtained a Postgraduate Certificate in Education (PGCE) at the University College of the Gold Coast, then a constituent college of the University of London.

== Career ==
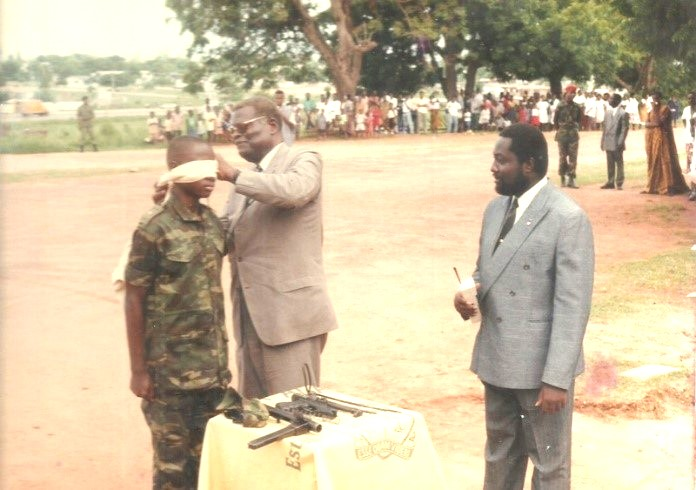
Nathan Quao blindfolding a cadet during an event at Accra Academy

Nathan Quao’s early career was in teaching. He taught at the Accra Academy starting in 1936 and was the first headmaster of the Keta Secondary School from 1953 to 1956. He also served as the Acting Principal of the Winneba Training College. Additionally, he taught at the Department of Teacher Training of the Kumasi College of Technology in 1957 and earlier on, at the Extra Mural Department of the University College of the Gold Coast from 1950 to 1951.

Quao joined the foreign service of the Ghanaian civil service in 1959, becoming a career diplomat and civil servant in Belgrade, Ottawa and Paris and as Counsellor to Ghana's Permanent Mission to the United Nations in New York City. Later on, he was appointed the Principal Secretary at the Ministry of Foreign Affairs in 1966.

After the overthrow of Nkrumah, the military junta transferred him to the Office of the National Liberation Council (NLC) where he was originally Deputy Secretary to the NLC government before being appointed Secretary to the Executive Council. The Executive Council stood as the collective executive authority until the election of the prime minister in the Second Republic.

In the Second Republic, he held the positions of Secretary to the Presidential Commission in 1969 and Secretary to the Council of State in 1970 and subsequently Secretary to the President upon assumption of the office of president by Edward Akufo-Addo.

Under the leadership of Ignatius Kutu Acheampong, Nathan Quao served as the Secretary to the National Redemption Council (NRC) and Head of the Civil Service, retiring in 1973.

In 1974, Quao was appointed the Chairman of the Ghana Teaching Council and a member of the Manpower Board. In 1978, he was made chairman of the reconstituted Ghana Education Service Council. In 1980, he became a member of the University of Cape Coast Council.

He was however plucked out of retirement in 1985 and appointed a Secretary at the PNDC Secretariat. Upon return to civilian rule in 1992, he became a Special Assistant to Jerry John Rawlings from 1993 to 2001.

Quao was chairman of the board of Agricultural Development Bank from 1990 to 2002.

== Personal life and family ==
He was married to Dora Tawia Quao (née Mettle) with two children. In addition, Quao's cousin was the Ghanaian barrister and judge, Nii Amaa Ollennu who was elected the Speaker of the Parliament of Ghana during the Second Republic as well as serving as the Chairman of the Presidential Commission and acting President of Ghana from 7 August 1970 to 31 August 1970. Quao was the uncle of the Ghanaian economist and diplomat, Amon Nikoi, who was the Governor of the Bank of Ghana from 1973 to 1977 and Finance minister from 1979 to 1981. His brother-in-law, the Rev. Carl Henry Clerk (1895–1982) was an agricultural educator and Presbyterian minister who was elected the fourth Synod Clerk of the Presbyterian Church of the Gold Coast from 1950 to 1954. Clerk was also the Editor of the Christian Messenger, the newspaper of the Presbyterian Church of Ghana from 1960 to 1963. Carl Clerk's sons were the academics, Nicholas T. Clerk and George C. Clerk.

== Death and state funeral ==
Nathan Quao died in Accra on 15 February 2005 of natural causes. He was accorded a state funeral on Friday 8 April 2005 at the Forecourt of the State House and buried at the La Public Cemetery by the Ghanaian government as a token of the state's appreciation of his distinguished service to the country.

== Legacy and honours ==
He was a recipient of the Order of the Volta (Civil Division) in 1975 and the Officer of the Order of the Star of Ghana (Civil Division) in 1997.

In recognition of his service to the Ghanaian civil service, the Civil Service and Local Government Staff Association (CLOGSAG) renamed its auditorium in his memory. In addition, the Association made a book compilation of Quao's writings and memoirs to preserve his legacy. Furthermore, the Local Government Service of Ghana instituted "an Annual Awards Scheme as part of the United Nations / African Union Public Service Day to be sponsored by the Government of Ghana in his honour." The Government of Ghana instituted the "Nathan Quao Award for Excellence in Civil Service" to recognise "outstanding civil servants who have demonstrated exceptional commitment to public service, integrity and exemplary performance.

A boys' dormitory at the Keta Secondary School, Quao House was named in his honour as the founding headmaster of the school.

The Nathan Quao Street in the Accra suburb, Kaneshie, was named after him.

In 2018, the Civil and Local Government Staff Association, Ghana (CLOGSAG) instituted the Nathan Anang Quao annual lectures "not only to celebrate Mr. N.A. Quao a distinguished civil servant but also to continue to emphasize on the critical need for civil and local government service staff to exhibit professionalism and remain non-partisan in the performance of duties and service to the country."
