= Christiane Akoua Ekué =

Togolese writer (born 1954)

- Born: Christiane Tchotcho Akoua Ekué; 1954 (age 71–72); Lomé, Togo
- Writing career
- Language: French

Christiane Tchotcho Akoua Ekué (born 1954) is a Togolese writer writing in French and a publisher.

== Biography ==
Ekué is the daughter of an accountant and a teacher, she was born in Lomé in 1954. Her family spoke Mina at home. She attended the school in Lomé where her mother was headmistress, going on to further studies in Beaune in France, in Togo and in Saarbrücken, Germany.

After completing her schooling, she worked as a copy editor for the Togo publishing house Nouvelles Editions Africaines; in 1989, she wrote her first novel, which tells the story of another novelist who has his manuscript stolen. In 1992, Ekué became assistant publisher and later became director for the company. In 2005, she founded the publishing house Graines de Pensée in Lomé.

== Selected works ==
- Le Crime de la rue des notables [Crime in the Street of the Rich and Famous], novel (Lomé: Les Nouvelles Editions Africaines, 1989)
- Partir en France [Leaving for France], narrative (Editions HAHO, 1996. ISBN 2-906718-63-7)
