= Anthony Osarfo =

Ghanaian journalist and screenwriter

- Occupation: Screenwriter
- Period: 2009–present
- Subject: Supernatural horror

Anthony Osarfo is a Ghanaian journalist and screenwriter known for feature-genre writing in supernatural horror.

== Career ==
Anthony began his professional journey in 2006 as an entertainment news writer for publications such as Graphic Showbiz and Daily Punch. He served as the Deputy Editor of Razz Newspapers and also as a Senior Editor for online news portal, GhBase.com.

His career as a screenwriter began in 2009. Since then, he has gone on to write a number of screenplays which include Honor Janet, "Death or No Birth" and "Spell by Deed".

In 2024, he was appointed as a judge at the US Presidential Service Center Film Festival, to assess winners and finalists of the film festival.

== Recognition ==
In the year 2019, Anthony's screenplay "Horror Janet" won the Best Original Screenplay Award at the Hollywood Blood Horror Festival. The following year, Horror Janet won the Grand Jury Gold Award at the Los Angeles Motion Picture Festival.

He also won the award for Best Horror Screenplay at the Creepy Tree Film Festival Winter Festival, for his work on "Death or No Birth". His screenplay "Odor" was shortlisted as a finalist at Oregon Short Film Festival.

== Anthony Wins Ghc1m Malicious Prosecution Case Against Asamoah Gyan ==
Anthony investigated and wrote a publication on a scandal involving Sarah Kwabla and former captain of the Ghana national football team, Asamoah Gyan.This action which led to his arrest on July 29, 2015, on the grounds of extortion. The case was thrown out of court presided by Her Honour Afia Agbanu Kumador at an Accra Circuit Court in 2019, after failing to establish Prima Facie for the case and subsequent arrest.

Anthony sued Asamoah Gyan and his manager, Samuel Anim Addo for malicious prosecution. As a result, Asamoah Gyan was ordered to pay Ghc1 million in damages to Anthony.
