= Marie-Christine Koundja =

Marie-Christine Koundja (born 30 March 1957) is a Chadian writer and diplomat, who has worked in various departments, ministries and embassies of her country. The first published female Chadian author, she has written two novels: Al-Istifakh, ou, L'idylle de mes amis (2001) and Kam-Ndjaha, la dévoreuse (2009).

== Biography ==
Koundja was born in the eastern Chad town of Iriba in 1957. After secondary school, she studied law for one year at the University of N'Djamena, interrupting her studies to enrol in secretarial school in Yaoundé, Cameroon. She worked for several Chadian state agencies in Cameroon, including the civil service, and was later named the minister of Foreign Affairs at the embassy of Chad.

When her first book, Al-Istifakh ou l'idylle de mes amis, was released in Yaoundé in 2001 (Editions Clé), Koundja became the first female published author in Chad's history. The novel is the story of two young people who decide to marry despite their parents withholding consent because of their tribal and religious differences. The novel ends positively, with the couple living happily in France and Koundja uses their marriage to symbolize the social issues plaguing Chadian society since 1979, and to advocate a culture of forgiveness.

Koundja later became First Secretary at the Chadian Embassy in Abuja, Nigeria. Her second novel, Kam-Ndjaha, la dévoreuse, was published in 2009 (Paris: Éditions Menaibuc). The book deals with themes of poverty, infidelity, and friendship.

Koundja is the mother of four children.

== Works ==
- Al-Istifakh ou l'idylle de mes amis ("Al-Istifakh, or the Romance of my Friends"), Yaoundé: Editions Clé, 2001 (146pp.). ISBN 2-7235-0129-9. Preface by Pascal Charlemagne Messanga Nyamding.
- Kam-Ndjaha, la dévoreuse, Paris: Éditions Menaibuc, 2009. ISBN 9782353490820
