= Kofi Akpabli =

Ghanaian academic

- Born: Accra, Ghana
- Occupations: Journalist, Publisher
- Writing career
- Genre: Non-fiction
- Subject: Travel Writing
- Notable awards: CNN Multichoice African Journalist Award Winner; 2010 and 2011

Kofi Akpabli (born 18 December 1973, Accra) is a Ghanaian academic, journalist, publisher, tourism consultant and cultural activist. He is a two-time winner of the CNN Multichoice African Journalist for Arts and Culture Awards. His latest work 'Made in Nima' has been featured in the new Commonwealth Anthology which was published in May 2016 Safe House: Explorations into Creative Non-Fiction. Akpabli has four books to his credit and currently works as a lecturer at Central University College in Ghana. He is a founding member of Ghana Cultural Forum and has participated in Xplore FrankfurtRheinemann 2012, Tallberg Forum, Sweden 2011, Berlin Art Festival 2010 and the Düsseldorf Art Preview 2010.

== Life ==
Born in Accra, Akpabli grew up in Kotobabi and had his primary education at Providence Preparatory School, transferring in his final year to St. Kizito Middle School at Nima. He started Secondary education at Some Secondary School, Agbozume in the Volta Region of Ghana and continued at Nsaba Presby Secondary School at Agona Nsaba in the Central Region where he obtained his 'O' Level Certificate in 1990. He proceeded to St. Paul's Secondary School, Denu from 1990 to 1992; obtaining 'A' Level Certificate from here.

Akpabli obtained his undergraduate degree from the University of Cape Coast in the Central Region from 1993 to 1998 where he completed with honours in Primary Education. In 2002 he enrolled for an MPhil in tourism programme from the same university. After a one-year study tour in the UK, he took interest in travel writing as practiced in the British press. Back in Ghana in 2004, Akpabli completed his MPhil degree in 2005. His thesis was entitled 'Promoting Tourism through Travel Writing in Ghanaian Newspapers.' Between 2006 and 2007, he attended the University of Ghana to obtain a Master of Arts Degree in Communication Studies. His MA major was journalism and public relations.

== Work ==
Akpabli currently works as a lecturer at the Central University College in the Greater Accra Region where he teaches courses in Communication Studies as well as African Studies.

Before working at Central University, he worked with the Ghana Tourist Board (now, Ghana Tourism Authority) for over a decade. He rose through the ranks; starting as a Resource officer in the Bolgatanga Office in the Upper East Region from 2000 to 2002 and finishing as a Principal Marketing officer at the Head Office of the Ghana Tourist Authority in Accra. Other portfolios he handled in the same organization include; Senior Marketing Officer in the Greater Accra Regional Office, Senior Resource Officer in the Bolgatanga Office.

Between 1999 and 2000, Akpabli taught English Methodology at St. John Bosco Training College, Navrongo.

== Journalism ==
While serving with the Tourism Board in Northern Ghana, Akpabli started freelancing for the Graphic Showbiz, a weekly newspaper of the Graphic Communication Group. His beat was on the environment and tourism issues. He also freelanced for the Daily Graphic, Ghanaian Times, Business and Financial Times Weekly Spectator, Public Agenda and The Daily Mail.

His article on Baobab in 2002 won an award in the International Federation of Environmental Journalists contest organized by Conservation International. The winning story entitled 'Baobab Baobab and More' was published in the Ghanaian Daily Mail. He also wrote news commentaries which were aired on Radio Ghana. Akpabli developed a strategy on how to use Valentine's Day celebration in Ghana to promote domestic tourism. Broadcast on Radio Ghana news bulletin – 14 February 2005, observers believe that this influenced the institution of February 14 as National Chocolate Day in Ghana. In September 2007 he was among five journalists from Africa who won a place to participate in the United Nations Department of Public Information conference on Climate Change held in UN Headquarters, New York. He currently writes a weekly column 'Going Places' in the Mirror

Akpabli is so far the only newspaper journalist and freelancer in Ghana to have won the CNN award; the other winners all being broadcast journalists.

== Writing ==
Akpabli started writing in 1991 when as a sixth-form student, a historical play he wrote captured first prize in a National Play Writing Contest. It was organized by the Pan African Historical Theatre Festival (PANAFEST). The theatre piece, 'The Prince and the Slave', has subsequently run at the Art Centre in Accra, and at the Cape Coast Castle.

Akpabli describes himself as a writer and cultural activist whose scholarly interests include researching and communicating key values of African arts and culture. Since January 2012, he has been a writing a weekly travel column entitled "Going Places" which focuses on culture and tourism issues around the world for the Mirror Newspaper of the Graphic Communication Group. He is also a features contributor for the Daily Graphic and the Business and Financial Times.

Prof. Atukwei Okai described him as a "philosophical essayist". Prof. Esi Sutherland-Addy also describes Akpabli's writing thus: "I have been trying to figure out what the x-factor in Kofi Akpabli's work is and I think I have it. It is his ability to let Ghana speak to him instead of him speaking 'at' Ghana".

Since 2011 he has led a national campaign to promote reading for pleasure. Together with his project partner and author Nana Awere Damoah, they read at corporate events, schools and to the general body.

== Books ==
Kofi Akpabli is the author of four books

- Tickling the Ghanaian-Encounters with Contemporary Culture, Accra: TREC, 2014
- Harmattan- a Cultural Profile of Northern Ghana, Accra: TREC, 2014
- Romancing Ghanaland the Beauty of Ten Region, Accra: TREC, 2011
- A Sense of Savannah-Tales of a Friendly Walk Through Northern Ghana, Accra: TREC, 2011

== Awards and recognition ==
In October 2016, Kofi Akpabli was adjudged Travel Writer of the year by the Ghana Tourism Authority.

In June 2011 in South Africa, Kofi Akpabli was voted CNN Multichoice African Journalist for Arts and Culture for the second time; making it the only time an African has annexed the CNN African Journalist Awards category back-to-back. His winning article is about the love-hate relationship Ghanaians have with ‘akpeteshie’, a locally brewed gin. In Uganda the previous year, he had won the same award category with a feature about the soup culture of Ghanaians.

In Ghana, in 2013, he won the Travel and Tourism Writer of the Year Award by the Ministry of Tourism and Creative Arts. In 2010, he was voted Journalist of the Year Award in the category of Entertainment and Tourism by the Ghana Journalist Association.

In a French language competition in the Upper East region in 2002, he won first prize in the professional category and represented the region in Accra March 2003 where he placed 2nd in the national finals.

In August 2002, Kofi received the Biodiversity Reporting Award. This recognition came from Conservation International, USA, International Centre for Journalists, USA and International Federation of Environmental Journalists, USA.
