= Jérôme Nouhouaï =

Beninese novelist

Jérôme Nouhouaï is a Beninese novelist. He was born in Abomey in 1973. He studied in Germany and currently lives and works in Cotonou. He is part of the Caravane du livre education project in Africa.

Nouhouaï has written two novels: Le piment des plus beaux jours (Le Serpent à Plumes, 2010) and La mort du lendemain (Présence Africaine, 2010).
