= Eddie Iroh =

Nigerian novelist and journalist (born 1945)

Eddie Albert Okechukwu Iroh (born 21 April 1945) is a Nigerian novelist, journalist and former director of the Federal Radio Corporation of Nigeria.

He is best known internationally for his trilogy of war novels: Forty-Eight Guns for the General (1976), Toads of War (1979) and The Siren in the Night (1982). All were published in Heinemann's African Writers Series.

== Life ==
I was born on banana leaves and partially orphaned at eight. I learnt to pull myself up by my boot-straps. I have been clerk, columnist, critic, correspondent, publisher, and producer–in that order. Trained in the militia I spent the civil war years ‘commanding’ the War Reports desk in the secessionist War Information Bureau from where I made occasional forays to the battle-fronts, covering the encirclement and recapture of Owerri by the secessionists in the summer of 1969. For a while I served on the research staff of the secessionist Briefs Committee which drafted all major speeches and policy positions. For the past year and a half, I have been writing and producing for Nigerian Television in Enugu.

— Eddie Iroh

Eddie Iroh was born on 21 April 1945 at Mgboma, Imo State in what was then the Colony and Protectorate of Nigeria. He attended St. Theresa's Primary School in Mgboma between 1951 and 1957, followed by a correspondence course at the University of London between 1960 and 1965.

In 1967 Iroh joined the Ministry of Information in Enugu where he remained for the duration of the Nigerian Civil War. After the war ended in 1970 he moved to the Reuters News Agency. By 1973 he had joined Evans Publishers as an editorial representative, and the following year he became an executive producer at the Nigerian Television Authority. In 1979, he was promoted to head the Documentary and Features Department. During the 1980s, Iroh acted as the managing editor and the regional editor of The Guardian newspaper. He then served as director general at the Federal Radio Corporation of Nigeria between 1999 and 2005.

In 2004 Eddie Iroh was awarded an honorary doctoral degree in public administration from Imo State University. He was also elected President of Union of National Radio and Television Organisations of Africa (URTNA).

== Works ==
- Iroh, Eddie (1976). Forty-Eight Guns for the General. London: Heinemann.
- —— (1979). Toads of war. London: Heinemann.
- —— (1981). Without a silver spoon. Ibadan: Spectrum Books.
- —— (1982). The siren in the night. London: Heinemann.
- —— (2011). Banana Leaves. Ibadan: Spectrum Books.

== Sources ==
- Onyedika, Nkiru (21 December 2005). "Nigeria: Let Adewopo Complete His Legacy". Vanguard. Lagos.
- "Nigeria: Iroh is 64". Daily Independent. Lagos. 18 April 2009.
- "Nigeria: IROH Elected URTNA President". This Day. Lagos. 16 October 2004.
