= Bill Okyere Marshall =

Ghanaian writer (1933–2021)

Bill Okyere Marshall (1933 — June 2, 2021) was a Ghanaian writer.

== Biography ==
Bill Okyere Marshall was born in 1933 into a wealthy family in Ghana. After attending Odogonor Secondary School, in the 1960s he attended the Guildhall School of Music and Drama in London, England, to further his studies in playwriting and film. This was followed by further studies in film and literature. He studied film at the Television Production School.

After an extended period in England, which included experience writing for the BBC and some time working, he went to Peterborough, New Hampshire. While he was there, he wrote the play The Son of Umbele. On his return to Ghana, Marshall wrote a newspaper column under the nom de plume "Tuli Blanko". It was through this column that he became known to a wide readership.

He joined the Ghana Broadcasting Corporation-Television as a producer. From GBC-TV he joined Lintas Ghana for four years, before establishing Studio Africain, of which he was the managing director. Between 1973 and 2003, Marshall produced four plays and two novels, wrote regularly for the press and worked in the Ghana Television drama department.

He was appointed Director of the National Film and Television Institute (NAFTI), a post he held for 12 years, before retiring.

Bill Marshall was a fellow of the Ghana Association of Writers (GAW) and served as Deputy General Secretary, General Secretary and Vice President of the Association under the late Professor Atukwei Okai. Marshall was a Fellow of the Pan African Writers Association (PAWA)

Over the decades, his writings were wide and diverse spanning film and television, radio, the press and books.

== Plays and themes ==
In 1973, Marshall produced his first play, The Son of Umbele, about a cursed fisherman's daughter and the son of a powerful woman. He also wrote a number of novels, including Bukom (1979) and Permit for Survival (1981), and published a collection of plays, The Crows and Other Plays. In 2003, he produced the play The Shadow of an Eagle, engaging mythology and symbolism to explore ideas of personal ambition and fulfillment. His most recent play Stranger to Innocence was also produced in 2003.

== Works ==
- The Son of Umbele (play, 1973)
- Child from the North (play, 1972, won the Hollywood festival of world television; best new comer's award)
- Bukom (novel, 1979 won the Ghana National Book Award for the young writer in 1979)
- Permit for Survival (novel, 1981)
- The Crows and Other Plays (collection of plays, 1998)
- Oyster Man (play, 2000),
- Stranger to Innocence (play, 2003)
- Shadow of an Eagle (play, 2003)
- Uncle Blanko’s Chair (2007)
- Asana (a play in three acts, 2013)
- Brother Man (novel)
