= Myne Whitman =

Nigerian writer, editor and publisher

- Born: Nkemdilim Nwankwo; Nigeria
- Citizenship: Nigerian
- Occupations: Author, Blogger
- Writing career
- Language: English
- Years active: 2009–present
- Genres: Romance, Contemporary fiction
- Notable work: A Heart to Mend

Nkem Okotcha who writes under the pen name Myne Whitman (born 26 October 1977) is a Nigerian writer, editor and publisher. She is the author of two romance novels, both of which rose to the top of Amazon.com bestseller lists for romantic fiction within their first few months of being self-published. This feat, achieved through targeted and sustained online book promotion among fiction bloggers, and the Nigerian online and traditional media, brought her to the attention of literary circles in Nigeria where romance and fiction in general, is not very common. Her books have been described as showing that not only do Nigerians "fall in love and marry for love, [but] also use love to conquer a wide range of situations that could have ordinarily been a bit difficult to shoulder alone."

== Personal life and education ==
Nkem Okotcha was born on 26 October 1977 and is the second of five children with three sisters and one brother immediately after her. She was born in Enugu and had majority of her education in the eastern part of Nigeria. Her family were avid readers, starting with her parents, so books were always around her. Her mother was a school teacher and her father worked for the National Electoral Commission, so her love of reading and education came from them and from the environment of Enugu, which is a part an academic and civil service city.

Nkem attended Ekulu Primary School and junior secondary in Queens School, both in Enugu. For her senior secondary school, she transferred to the Loretto Special Science School before moving to the Nnamdi Azikiwe University in Anambra to study Biological Sciences for her first degree.

Graduating in 2000, Nkem moved to Abuja, where she lived and worked for several years, ending with a two-year stint in a commercial bank before she left Nigeria in 2006 to study for a master's degree in Public Health Research at the University of Edinburgh. Nkem says she has "been a teacher, NGO consultant, banker, skate-hire attendant, and researcher and have worked for the government both in Nigeria and Scotland." Nkem moved to Seattle in the United States after she got married, and currently lives there with her husband though she visits Nigeria regularly for work and vacations.

== Pseudonym ==
Of her pseudonym, Nkem has said: "Myne Whitman is a name I coined myself when I began to write seriously while still in secondary school. Most of the books I read were in English, and since I was writing in English too, I decided my name would be the same. So the pseudonym is a play on the transliterated words of my maiden name, Nkem Okotcha."

== Writing ==
Nkem says she has had a long-running relationship with writing. While in primary school, she wrote children's adventures for her siblings to read. She wrote some poetry in secondary school, and started writing again, this time in the romance genre, when she entered university. A dry spell followed while she tried to build a career until she resumed writing in 2009 after she got married.

Nkem has written two popular romance novels, A Heart to Mend and A Love Rekindled. In addition, she has written several short stories published in various Nigerian media, all under the pen name of Myne Whitman.

== Blog and website ==
In addition to her writing, Myne Whitman also runs Romance Meets Life, a lifestyle blog about relationships, parenting celebrity and entertainment. The blog was originally started in 2009 as a way of promoting her novels, and it evolved into its current form over time, focusing mostly on matters of interest to Nigerian women.

Myne Whitman also manages Naija Stories, a site which hosts a community of readers and writers of stories of interest to Nigerians.

== Bibliography ==
- A Heart to Mend (2009). ISBN 978-1449047504
- A Love Rekindled (2011). ISBN 978-1456516864
