= Mohammad Elsannour =

Egyptian author

Mohammad Elsannour محمد السنور
- Mohammad Ayman Elsannour
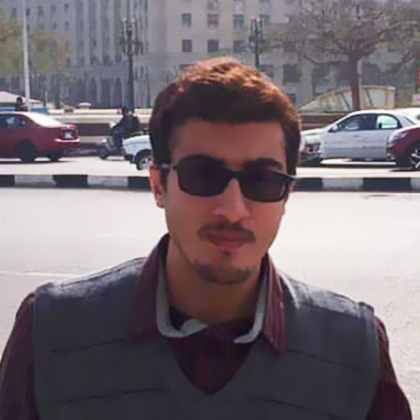
- Born: United Arab Emirates
- Occupations: Author; Novelist
- Writing career
- Language: Arabic; English
- Website: Mohammad Elsannour

Mohammad Ayman Elsannour (Arabic: محمد أيمن السنور) is an Egyptian author, novelist, and pharmacist. He was born in United Arab Emirates.

== Biography ==
Elsannour was born and raised in the city of Al Ain, Abu Dhabi. He received his bachelor's degree in pharmacy from the United Arab Emirates University, and obtained a master's degree in biochemistry, as well as a master's degree in international human resource management and master's in health innovation from France and from the United States of America.

His writings focus on issues of racism and also the preservation of the Arab origin. He has authored several novels, including Louise Membership (2019), about a pharmaceutical company named Louise, as well as Placebo (2020), Om Ghafa (2020), and I Can't Breathe (2020).

== Critical reception ==
=== Louise Membership ===
Midwest Book Review writes that Louise Membership is a "pharmaceutical company called Louise, which is in fact a very precise and global gang." A review by Monika Kosman in Global Comment describes Louise Membership as "a poignant and clever portrayal of the real face of drug companies," and notes the award of the Crime Prize in fiction for this work "was greeted with an outpouring of enthusiasm by the Egyptian Ministry of Interior, because his book is considered a source of inspiration for many officers working in the new smuggling and drug-trafficking operations in the Middle East." A review by Tony Ramzy in Arabian Book Review states Louise Membership "is a relentless, compulsive read. It acts upon the reader like a drug, rendering you hungry to turn the page, to read more, more. To explore more, more of the darkness. It is a fascinating, terrifying read—akin to the best horror fiction, the most superior crime fiction, and, ultimately, the novel stands as one of the greatest literary masterpieces in any genre." He also adds, "if the characters still have the power to provoke conspiracy and confuse expectations, if the stories not only attract the reader, but hit him on the head until he sits and notices that he really may be targeted, so “Louise Membership”, quite simply, a must-read book."

=== Placebo ===
Rania Salem, writing for The Arab Daily News, describes Placebo as a novel "which talks about severe racism and how to deal with it in a correct way." Critical reception for Placebo includes a review by Somia Omar in Arab World Books, who writes, "It is all very relatable, especially if you're roughly of his generation. I felt pinprick-precise needlings of nostalgia; Placebo will surely find readers who'll groan and declare they “feel so seen”."

=== I Can't Breathe ===
A review by Fairuz Ahmed in The Authors of The Middle East describes I Can't Breathe as a "loathsome story of broken people, broken hearts and broken lives. Elsanour, has factually written everything realistically, without any character assassination." She also says "I Can't Breathe, is truly amazing, and although it is a fiction novel, it is almost realistic and sincere to the utmost degree, especially since Elsanour was adept at mixing reality and fiction in a very accurate and interesting way at the same time." Sarah Khalid writes in a review for Arabian Book Review that "This book is absolutely crucial in establishing, once and for all, that people of color are up against a system that is prejudiced against them, and that that system needs to change." And she describes I Can't Breathe as "very exciting and artistic, full of great suspense." She also writes that I Can't Breathe is "very heavy, despite its almost 200 pages, it resembles a hearty meal from fast food restaurants, which is very fatty and satisfies your cultural hunger."

== Publications ==
- Elsannour, Mohammad (2019). Louise Membership. Yavi Publishing and Distribution House. ISBN 9789776718142. (Arabic title: عضوية لويز)
- Elsannour, Mohammad (2020). Placebo. Stockholm: The Arab Book Digitization House. ISBN 9789189273214. (Arabic title: بلاسيبو)
- Elsannour, Mohammad (2020). Om Ghafa. Stockholm: The Arab Book Digitization House. ISBN 9789189273139. (Arabic title: أم غافة)
- Elsannour, Mohammad (2020). I Can't Breathe. Stockholm: The Arab Book Digitization House. ISBN 9789189273467. (Arabic title: لا أستطيع التنفس)
- Elsannour, Mohammad (2021). I Can't Breathe (English ed.). Stockholm: The Arab Book Digitization House. ISBN 9798725040708. Translated by Manuela Alex.
- Elsannour, Mohammad (2021). Capsaicin. Stockholm: The Arab Book Digitization House. ISBN 9789189288058.

== Participations ==
He participated in many International and Arab exhibitions such as Cairo International Book Fair, Abu Dhabi International Book Fair and Sharjah International Book Fair and other Arab exhibitions, and he also conducted several seminars and special and television lectures.

== Honors and awards ==
- 2019 The Best Arabic Books, Arabian Book Review (Louise Membership)
- 2020 Egyptian Crime Fiction Prize, Egypt (Louise Membership)
- 2020 The Best Arabic Books, Arabian Book Review (I Can't Breathe)
- 2021 The Author Of The Year, Authors of The Middle East
