= Jojo Cobbinah =

Ghanaian author and writer

Jojo Cobbinah (born 25 May 1948) is a Ghanaian author living in Accra, Ghana, noted for his travel guides.

== Biography ==
Cobbinah was born in Bogoso, north of Tarkwa, in the Western Region of Ghana. He attended a Catholic school in his home country, studying in Cape Coast, as well as in Abidjan (Ivory Coast) and Dijon (France). From 1974 to 2009, he lived in Germany, initially in West Berlin and later in different places in the northern part of the Rhine-Main area. He returned to Ghana in 2010, but he still travels to Europe at regular intervals to support intercultural cooperation.

He gained prestige with his travel guides for Senegal, Gambia and Madeira, but most notably with his work about his home country Ghana, formerly only writing in English. All 11 editions of his Ghana travel guide have been published in German. It has become a benchmark work in German-speaking regions and was tagged one of the best travel guides for an African country in a survey by the UNESCO committee.

In cooperation with former spokesman of the Frankfurt Book Fair, Holger Ehling, he worked on Westafrikanisch Kochen, a cookbook for West African food. Cobbinah also supported his author colleague Barbi Lasar with his book about the South African Cape Region: Südafrika: Die Kapregion.

As a columnist and book reviewer Cobbinah is also part of the editorial staff of The African Courier, a journal published in English. In 2003, he developed Ghana's first all-expense tour offer for Ghana Airways. His most recent work is Dr. Amo’s Lonely Planet, a novel about Anton Wilhelm Amo, who was the first African from south of the Sahara Desert to study in Germany.

== Bibliography ==
- with Holger Ehling: Westafrikanisch kochen. Edition diá, Berlin 1998, ISBN 3895332151
- Ghana: Practical Traveller's Guide to the Gold Coast of West Africa. Peter Meyer, Frankfurt/Main 1999, ISBN 392205711X
- Madeira. Erholen und Wandern auf der Blumeninsel im Atlantik Peter Meyer, Frankfurt/Main 2000, ISBN 3922057799
- Senegal, Gambia. Praktischer Reiseführer an die Westspitze Afrikas. Peter Meyer, Frankfurt/Main 2002, 4. Auflage, ISBN 3898591034
- Ghana. Praktisches Reisehandbuch für die „Goldküste“ Westafrikas. 11. Auflage, Peter Meyer, Frankfurt/Main 2012, ISBN 978-3-89859-155-3
- Dr. Amo’s Lonely Planet. Novel. E-Book. Peter Meyer, Frankfurt/Main 2013, ISBN 978-3-89859-001-3
