= Kofi Batsa =

Ghanaian political activist and writer (1931–1991)

Kofi Batsa (1931 – 1991) was a Ghanaian political activist and writer.

== Life ==
Kofi Batsa was born on 8 January 1931 in Piengwah, Ghana (formerly the Gold Coast). He was one of twelve children born to his mother and father though only six survived.

Batsa became President of the Takoradi Youth League in Ghana, and a member of the executive committee of the World Federation of Democratic Youth (WFDY). He was among 81 people expelled from Kwame Nkrumah's Convention People's Party (CPP) in 1954. However, Batsa was subsequently re-admitted to the CPP and made principal research officer at the Bureau of African Affairs. For a while he was editor of the monthly Voice of Africa. In December 1962 Nkrumah made him editor of The Spark, an intellectual magazine established to "spell out the content of socialism". The Spark criticized the idea of "African socialism", attempting to enunciate a properly "scientific socialism" for an African context. In November 1963 Batsa also became Secretary-General of the Pan-African Union of Journalists (PAUJ).

After Nkrumah's fall from power, Batsa moved away from socialism towards capitalism. He returned to politics as an aide to Hilla Limann's 1979–81 government. Kofi Batsa had many loved children, he lived his life mostly with his son Julian Ayumu Batsa before remarrying to Georgina Batsa and having another son. Kofi's life will remembered by his Wife Georgina Batsa, sons and daughters Julian Batsa, Veronica Batsa, Idris Batsa and Brenda Batsa. Also by grandchildren Jeannette Batsa, Jerome Batsa, Janine Ewurama Batsa, Jayden Ayumu Batsa, Angelio Batsa- lue, Abena Batsa, Jeromey Batsa, Jermaine Batsa and Nyla Batsa.

== Works ==
- West German neo-colonialism and Africa: documentation of the neo-colonialist policy of West Germany in Africa, Accra: Spark Publikations, [1964].
- The Spark: From Kwame Nkrumah to Limann, London: Rex Collings, 1985
