= Francis Selormey =

Ghanaian writer

Francis Selormey (15 April 1927 – 1983) was a Ghanaian novelist, teacher, scriptwriter and sports administrator.

== Life ==
Born in Dzelukofe, in the Volta Region of Ghana, Selormey was brought up in Keta. He attended a Catholic primary school and then St. Augustine's College, Cape Coast. He studied physical education at the University of Ghana and in Germany before becoming a teacher. He was Senior Sports Organizer for the Central Region from 1960 to 1964. In 1965 he became a scriptwriter for the Ghana Film Industry Corporation. At some point he returned to sports administration, as Director of Sports for the Sports Council of Ghana. Married with six children, he spent the last years of his life as a farmer before his death in 1983.

The Narrow Path: An African Childhood, was published in Heinemann's African Writers Series in 1966. Semiautobiographical, it was "the Bildungsroman of a Ghanaian school boy", who is "caught between his love for an overly strict father who insists on Christian, Western ways and his own appreciation for other, traditional influences."

== Works ==
- The Narrow Path: An African Childhood, Heinemann, 1966. African Writers Series, no. 27.
- Towards a United Africa (film-script)
- The Great Lake (film-script)
