= Kofi Aidoo =

Ghanaian writer

Kofi Aidoo is a Ghanaian writer. He was born in the 1950s at Sagyimase in the Akim Abuakwa Traditional Area of Ghana, where he also began his elementary education at Asikwa. He initially wrote short stories based on experiences with his father traveling around the country. He studied at Anum Presbyterian Training College and later studied journalism part-time at the Ghana Institute of Journalism.

== Works ==
- Saworben: a collection of short stories, Tema: Ghana Publishing Corporation, 1977
- Of Men and Ghosts, ISBN 978-9964-1-0342-2, Ghana Publishing Corporation, 1991. Longman, 1994
