= Bediako Asare =

Ghanaian journalist and writer

Bediako Asare (born 1930) is a Ghanaian journalist and author, initially from Ghana. He began his career working on local newspapers, then relocated to Dar es Salaam, Tanzania in 1963, to help launch The Nationalist newspaper.

In 1969 he published his novel Rebel, about the conflict between traditional ways and modernity in Sub-Saharan Africa. Writing in Africa Report, Sheila Wilson said of The Rebel: "The story is simple and the language unpretentious, and the impact of change and hope gives strength and quality to the novel." Asare's novel The Stubborn was published in Nairobi in 1976. Stephen H. Arnold, reviewing it in the African Book Publishing Record, noted that its intended audience was "15-18 year olds of East African ruling classes" and that: "The main themes are science versus superstition and the value of counsel from elders."

== Works ==
- Bediako, K.A. (1966). Don't leave me mercy: Echoes from Owusu's marriage life. Accra: Anowuo Educational Publications.
- Bediako, K.A. (1966). The downfall of Kwame Nkrumah. Accra: Anowuo Educational Publications.
- Bediako, K.A. (1967). A husband for Esi Ellua. Accra: Anowuo Educational Publications.
- Bediako, K.A. (1969). Rebel. London: Heinemann Educational Books, (African Writers Series 59).
- Bediako, K.A. (1972). Mwasi (in Swahili). Nairobi: Heinemann Educational Books.
- Bediako, K.A. (1975). Majuto (in Swahili). Dar es Salaam: East African Literature Bureau.
- Bediako, K.A. (1976). The Stubborn. Nairobi: East African Literature Bureau.
