= P. A. K. Aboagye =

Ghanaian poet, essayist, novelist, and historian

Paul Alfred Kwesi Aboagye (5 January 1925 – 19 June 2001) was a Ghanaian poet, essayist, novelist, and historian of the Nzema language.

== Early life and education ==
Paul Alfred Kwesi Aboagye was born to the late Tufuhene Koame Aboagye of Nuba and madam Mary Bozomah Gyedu of Ebonloa in the Jomoro district of the Nzema people of Ghana. He started his elementary school education at Beyin on 5 February 1934 and completed his Middle school education in 1942. After working as a pupil teacher at Half Assini Roman Catholic Church school for one year, he proceeded to teacher's college at St. Augustine's College in 1944 and completed his teachers certificate 'A'.

== Public service ==
The first post as a trained teacher was at Half Assini Roman Catholic church school where he taught final year middle school students in Form four. He was relocated to Bonyere Roman Catholic church school where he taught middle school forms three and four. He was subsequently promoted as a headteacher after two and a half years. He was also relocated to Beyin and Axim as a Headteacher. In September 1957, he made a career change from teaching and joined the civil service of Ghana as an Assistant Editor for Nzema publications and the Nzema newspaper kakyevolɛ at the Bureau of Ghana Languages. He was appointed an honorary general secretary of the Nzema Literature and Culture Association - an organization that had the first president of Ghana Dr. Kwame Nkrumah among its pioneering founders. He held the position of honorary general secretary for this association for 27 years and was then made its lifetime general secretary - a position he held till he died. He became an editor at the Bureau of Ghana Languages after two years on the job and was the pioneer Nzema language newscaster on a part-time basis at Radio Ghana when the Nzema language was introduced into the programs of the Ghana Broadcasting Corporation in 1960. He retired from the Ghana civil service in 1981 as deputy Director of the Bureau of Ghana Languages. His community leadership roles among the Nzema people in the Accra metropolis included being the President of the Accra/Tema Nzema association, head of the Ahwea clan, and chairman of the Tawiafio residents association. In these roles, he excelled in bringing peace among people through non-adversarial conflict mediation and resolution using traditional mores and values of Nzema culture. He thus was able to save a lot of marriages that were in trouble.

== Literary work ==
Among his numerous publications were:

- Nzema née nrelenza edwɛbohilelɛ buluku (Nzema- English, English - Nzema dictionary)
- Nzema aneɛ ne anwo mgbanyidwɛkɛ (history of the Nzema)
- Ayɛne ( witchcraft)
- Nzema edwɛkɛnzɔhɔ (similies)
- Kpɔkɛdelɛ now folɛdule (advice on good health)
- Asoo ɔ ye nwomenle ɔ (Could it be the wife's ghost - a novel)
- Sele bie keyekye ɛ rɛle aha a (laugh and be comforted)
- Sukoa Nzema maamelɛ ne (learn the Nzema culture)
- Ekyi a ɛne wɔzɛ (a novel)

He also helped translate the old and new testament versions of the bible into Nzema and co-wrote a number of textbooks for junior and senior secondary school curricula. As at the time of writing, a posthumous publication of 'my wife's ghost'(a book he wrote) is almost complete and narrates the way in which the ghost of his first wife who died whilst giving birth, possessed his second wife at regular intervals.

== Awards and honors ==
- Ghana book and Development Council Award - 1978
- UNESCO fellow - 1962
- Life General Secretary - Nzema Literature and Culture Association
