= John Benibengor Blay =

Ghanaian journalist, writer, publisher and politician (born 1915)

John Benibengor Blay (born 1915, date of death unknown) was a Ghanaian journalist, writer, publisher and politician, who has been called "the father of popular writing in Ghana". His work encompasses fiction, poetry and drama published in chapbooks that have been compared with Onitsha Market Literature.

== Life and career ==
Blay was born in Half Assini, Western Ghana, and educated at the Regent Street Polytechnic in London.

He began writing poetry in 1937, publishing stories from the early 1940s onwards. Some of his work was published by his own publishing company, the Benibengor Book Agency, Aboso.

He later became a politician, and in 1958 Blay was elected to the Ghanaian National Assembly. He later served as Minister for Art and Culture (1965–66) under Kwame Nkrumah, about whom he published a biography in 1973.

== Works ==
Stories

- Emelia's Promise, 1944
- Be Content with Your Lot, 1947
- Parted Lovers, 1948
- Dr Bengto Wants a Wife, 1953
- Operation Witchcraft, 1956
- Tales for Boys and Girls, 1966
- After the Wedding (continuation of Emelia's Promise)
- Emelia's Promise and Fulfilment, Accra: Waterville Publishing House, 1967
- Alomo, Aboso, 1969
- Coconut Boy, Accra: West African Publishing Company, 1970

Poetry

- Immortal Deeds, Ilfracombe: Stockwell, 1940.
- Memoirs of the War, Ilfracombe: Stockwell, 1946
- King of the Human Frame, Ilfracombe: Stockwell, 1947
- Thoughts of Youth, Aboso: Benibengor Book Agency, 1961
- Ghana Sings, Accra: Waterville Publishing House, 1965. With an introduction by Kwame Nkrumah.

Other

- The Gold Coast Mines Employees' Union, Ilfracombe: Stockwell, 1950
- On The Air: (B.B.C. Talks), Aboso, 1970
- Legend of Kwame Nkrumah, 1973
- The Story of Tata, c. 1976
