= Benjamin Kwakye =

Ghanaian writer

Benjamin Kwakye (born 7 January 1967) is a Ghanaian novelist and lawyer. His first novel, The Clothes of Nakedness, won the 1999 Commonwealth Writers' Prize, best first book, Africa, and has been adapted for radio as a BBC Play of the Week. His novel The Sun by Night won the 2006 Commonwealth Writers' Prize, Best Book Africa. His novel The Other Crucifix won the 2011 IPPY award. His is also the winner of the 2021 African Literature Association's Book of the Year Award for Creative Writing. He was a finalist for the 2019 Snyder Poetry Prize as well as the 2023 and 2024 Eyelands Book Awards.

Kwakye was born in Accra, Ghana and attended the Presbyterian Boys' Secondary School. He graduated from Dartmouth College and Harvard Law School. He is the author of several works of fiction and poetry, including a trilogy of the African migrant's experiences in the US (The Other Crucifix, The Three Books of Shama and The Count's False Banquet). His impressive epic poem that spans over 400 pages has been described by Kirkus Review as an "imaginative tale" of "rhyming quatrains" that move with "wit and grace" and "contains cutting insights into human nature." His novel "Chronicles of Four Estates" was selected by Kirkus Reviews as one of the best indie books of 2025. He has been described as staking a claim to being incontestably in the front rank of African writers and as arguably the most important novelist to come out of Ghana since Ayi Kwei Armah. Kwakye practices law as in-house counsel, and is a director of the African Education Initiative. In his corporate legal career, he has worked with a number of private sector firms including Porter Wright, Abbott Laboratories, Hospira, Visa Inc. and General Motors.

== Works ==
- The Clothes of Nakedness, Heinemann Books, 1998, ISBN 978-0-435-91201-7
- The Sun by Night, Africa World Press, 2006, ISBN 978-1-59221-350-4
- The Other Crucifix, Ayebia Publishing, 2010; Lynne Rienner Pub, 2010, ISBN 978-0-9562401-2-5
- "Eyes of the Slain Woman", Anaphora, 2011
- Legacy of Phantoms, Africa World Press, 2015, ISBN 978-1-59221-800-4
- "Scrolls of the Living Night", Cissus World Press, 2015
- "The Executioner's Confession", Cissus World Press, 2015
- "The Three Books of Shama", Cissus World Press, 2016
- "The Count's False Banquet", Cissus World Press, 2017
- "Soul to Song", Cissus World Press, 2017
- "Songs of a Jealous Wind", Cissus World Press, 2018
- "Obsessions of Paradise", Cissus World Press, 2019
- "Songs of Benjamin", Cissus World Press, 2020
- "Innocence of Photographs", Cissus World Press, 2021
- "Shimmering at Sunset", (editor), Cissus World Press, 2021
- "Tale of Shadows", Cissus World Press, 2023
- "Seasons of Four Faces", Cissus World Press, 2024
- "Chronicles of Four Estates", Cissus World Press, 2025
