= Elizabeth-Irene Baitie =

Ghanaian writer of young-adult fiction

- Born: 1970 (age 55–56); Ghana
- Education: University of Ghana, University of Surrey, Achimota School
- Occupations: writer, biochemist
- Spouse: Rami
- Writing career
- Language: English
- Genre: fiction
- Notable works: The Twelfth Heart, The Dorm Challenge
- Notable awards: Burt Award for African Young Adult Literature

Elizabeth-Irene Baitie (born 1970) is a Ghanaian clinical biochemist and writer of fiction for young adults. She is also a founder and director at Patholab Medical Laboratory.

== Biography ==
After attending Achimota School, Baitie studied biochemistry and chemistry at the University of Ghana, Legon, then received a postgraduate degree in clinical biochemistry from the University of Surrey and now runs a medical laboratory in Adabraka. She wanted to write stories since she was seven years old and fits her writing around her day job and family life in Accra with three children and a husband, Rami. She writes after work, during weekends and also during commuting time.

== Awards ==
She has twice won First Prize in the Burt Award for African Literature given by the Canadian Organisation for Development through Education with support from the International Board on Books for Young People (IBBY): in 2009 for her novel The Twelfth Heart and in 2012 for The Dorm Challenge. The Twelfth Heart went on to sell 35,000 copies in the couple of years following the prize. In 2006 Baitie won the Macmillan Prize for Africa (Junior Readers) for her story "A Saint in Brown Sandals", and four years earlier her novel Lea's Christmas was shortlisted for the 2002 Macmillan Writers' Prize for Africa (Senior Readers). It has been suggested that there are more women writers in Ghana than a couple of decades ago, and that prizes for their work contribute to their success and encourage publishers to sign them up.

== Writing ==
Baitie writes for preteens as well as older teenagers. She visits schools and has worked with organisations like the Young Educators Foundation to promote reading and books. She likes to offer her readers excitement and a chance to escape into a different world, choosing not to emphasise themes of poverty and disadvantage in her books, unlike some other young people's literature in Ghana. In both The Twelfth Heart and The Dorm Challenge the theme of friendship is explored through the central character of Mercy, a girl who leaves her small village behind and meets new people at boarding school.
