= Nana Achampong =

Ghanaian writer (born 1964)

Nana Sandy Achampong MA
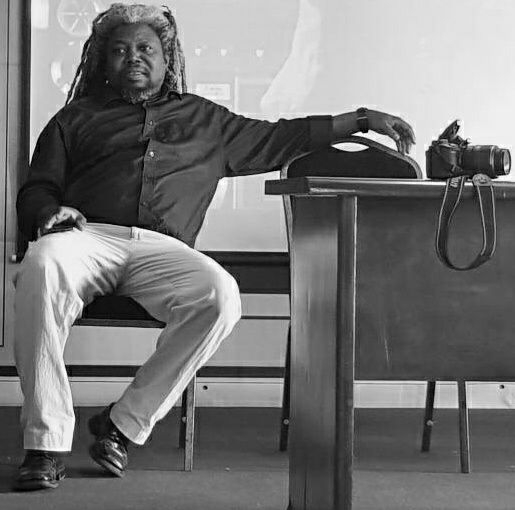
- Achampong at AUCC
- Born: November 26, 1964 (age 61); Cape Coast, Ghana
- Education: Ghana Institute of Journalism
- Occupations: Author, academic
- Writing career
- Genres: Poetry, fiction, anthology, media
- Notable work: The Ultimate Sacrifice, The Equilibrists, Sun of God, Adinkra (ī'kŏn')-cepts

Nana Sandy Achampong (born 1964) is a Ghanaian media practitioner, novelist, poet and educator. He has worked in the fields of journalism, public relations, advertising, marketing, the visual arts and literature in Ghana, the United Kingdom and the United States. He is an author of books that cover the different genres of poetry, play, for children, fiction, non-fiction, Christian, media and anthology. He currently teaches at the African University College of Communications (AUCC), where he is also the Director of the Ama Ata Aidoo Centre for Creative Writing.

== Early life and education ==
Achampong attended St. Hubert's Seminary School in Santasi, Kumasi. After completion and attaining his Advanced-Levels, he then furthered his study by joining the Ghana Institute of Journalism, Accra. At the American InterContinental University, he secured a Bachelor of Business Administration degree with a specialization in Project Management where he offered a Master's programme in Education, specialization in Instructional Design and Technology.

== Family ==
Achampong was born in Cape Coast on 26 November 1964, the third of seven siblings. His mother, Beatrice Faustina Forson, who died on 6 December 2018, was the Principal of a midwifery school. His father, Welbeck Kwame Acheampong, was a lawyer. He died in 1995. His mother then remarried to Mr. Joseph Amoah (who died in 2012), a publishing distributor for Caffrey Saunders, UK.

== Published works ==
Achampong is a proponent of contemporary writing and modern journalism. He has written on various topics and varying concepts, with some of his best work also encompassing the media and journalism. He scripted, produced and directed his first feature film The Ultimate Sacrifice in the late 1990s and among his most famous works are Depressed, "Embracing The Season", "God Smiled", Sudan, Nature Sighed.

Achampong's first book of verse, The Equilibrists, was published by Othello Books in 1995. His second volume of verse, Floating, was published ten years later. He published the novel I Dream a Song that was soon followed by Sun of God, a five-act play. Among his most notable books is the Adinkra (ī'kŏn')-cepts: [concept ikons of the Asante Akan of West Africa], which traces the history of the Akans of Ghana and explains some symbologies of their culture.

His book I, Immigrant, a controversial novel, was published soon afterwards. He encapsulates most of his poetical works in the ... and soft [salt], a collection of some of the best of his poetry works.

== Career history ==
Achampong has worked in various capacities and in various institutions, mostly media-related across the world. In earlier forays into the media industry, he worked at Smash-TV, where he was appointed Director to create and produce three seasons of a seminal weekly entertainment magazine programme for Ghana national and West African regional television.

In 1999, he worked as the Executive Producer and Director for Somnghai Fils UK Limited, London, United Kingdom, during which time he directed his first feature film, The Ultimate Sacrifice.

He was also a Pioneer Editor of the Weekend Sun, a weekly 48-page tabloid, where he oversaw the tabloid's website and media-related content. In 2007, he worked at The Gene C. Bradford Hour as the producer/director, where he scripted and co-hosted a programme on Radio One's WOLB 1010 AM in Woodlawn, Maryland.

Achampong has worked in a capacity as Editor for ElderSpeak a weekly TV programme on Fox's Good-TV. The Afro American Newspaper in Maryland, appointed him as their Special Correspondent in 2005 after his Masters.
