= Lawrence Darmani =

Ghanaian novelist, poet and publisher

Lawrence Darmani is a Ghanaian novelist, poet, and publisher. His first novel, Grief Child which was written in the year 1991,won the Commonwealth Writers' Prize as the best first book from Africa in 1992.

He also writes devotional articles for Our Daily Bread, which touches the lives of many Christians around the world. He fellowships with the Presbyterian Church of Ghana.

He is the editor of Step magazine and CEO of Step Publishers. He is married with two daughters and lives in Accra.

== Selected works ==
- Grief Child, Lion Pub., 1991, ISBN 978-0-7459-1821-1; iAcademic Books, 2001, ISBN 978-1-58868-147-8
- Stories from Africa 4, African Christian Press, 1996, ISBN 978-9964-87-855-9
- Young and Restless: Challenges facing the youth of today, Asempa Publishers, 1999, ISBN 978-9964-78-250-4
