= Kwei Quartey =

Ghanaian-American novelist

- Born: Kwei Quartey; Accra, Ghana
- Education: Accra Academy; University of Ghana; Howard University; University of California Los Angeles
- Occupations: Physician; Writer
- Writing career
- Genre: Detective fiction
- Notable work: Wife of the Gods (2009)
- Website: www.kweiquartey.com

Kwei Jones Quartey is a Ghanaian–American detective fiction novelist and retired physician. For about 20 years, while practising medicine, he also worked as a writer. He balanced both activities by writing in the early mornings before going to his clinic.

Quartey studied medicine at Howard University in Washington, D.C. He began practising in 1990 with HealthCare Partners in California. While working at the facility as an urgent care physician, he founded the facility's wound care center.

As a writer, he made the Los Angeles Times Bestseller List in 2009 for his book Wife of the Gods. A year later, he was awarded Best Male Author by the G.O.G. National Book Club. He is also a top 100 African American Literature Book Club bestselling author, making the list four times. Kwei Quartey has published a number of novels, and is a member of the Los Angeles branch of Sisters in Crime, a fiction writers' organization. His 2020 novel, The Missing American, was shortlisted for the Edgar Allan Poe Best Novel Award.

== Early life and education ==
Quartey was born in Accra, Ghana, to a Ghanaian father and an African-American mother, both of whom were lecturers at the University of Ghana. He drew his writing inspiration from the many books that filled his house at a very young age, and wrote his first novel when he was about eight or nine years old. As a teenager, his passion shifted to medicine, and he began to pursue his dream of becoming a physician. He studied at Achimota School and the Accra Academy prior to entering the University of Ghana Medical School for his training. His studies at the University of Ghana came to an abrupt end when his mother decided to return to the United States with the family following the death of his father. Quartey subsequently gained admission to Howard University, where he trained to as a medical doctor. After graduating, and residency training in Internal Medicine, Kwei joined the University of California, Los Angeles, where he took an extension course in creative writing.

== Awards ==
Year	Work	Award	Category	Result	Ref
2021	The Missing American	Edgar Awards	Novel	Shortlisted	–

== Bibliography ==
=== Novels ===
- Quartey, Kwei Jones (2014). Death at the Voyager Hotel (paperback ed.). Afram Publications. ISBN 978-9964705220.

Darko Dawson series

- Quartey, Kwei Jones (2009). Wife of the Gods (hardcover ed.). Random House. ISBN 978-1400067596.
- — (2011). Children of the Street (paperback ed.). Random House Trade Paperbacks. ISBN 978-0812981674.
- — (2014). Murder at Cape Three Points (hardcover ed.). Soho Crime. ISBN 978-1616953898.
- — (2016). Gold of Our Fathers (hardcover ed.). Soho Crime. ISBN 978-1616956301.
- — (2017). Death by His Grace (hardcover 1st ed.). Soho Crime. ISBN 978-1616957087.

Emma Djan series

- Quartey, Kwei Jones (2020). The Missing American (hardcover 1st ed.). Soho Crime. ISBN 978-1641290708.
- — (2021). Sleep Well, My Lady (hardcover 1st ed.). Soho Crime. ISBN 978-1641292078.
- — (2023). Last Seen in Lapaz (hardcover 1st ed.). Soho Crime. ISBN 978-1641293396.
- — (2024). The Whitewashed Tombs (hardcover 1st ed.). Soho Crime. ISBN 978-1641295888.
