= Asare Konadu =

Ghanaian writer, journalist, novelist, and publisher

Samuel Asare Konadu (18 January 1932 – 1994) was a Ghanaian journalist, novelist, and publisher who also wrote under the pseudonym Kwabena Asare Bediako.

== Biography ==
Born in Asamang, Ashanti Region, Gold Coast, Asare Konadu attended local primary and middle schools before studying at Abuakwa State College. He entered the Ghana Information Service in 1951, and also worked as a reporter for the Gold Coast Broadcasting Service.

In 1956 he was sent abroad by the government to study in London and at Strasbourg University, joining the Ghana News Agency on his return to Ghana in 1957.

== Works ==
Konadu's narrative strategy is considered unique among his Ghanaian contemporaries at the time that three stylistic features were notable in Ghanaian prose fiction. According to Charles Angmor, one being the "simple plot with simple character" and the other being the "intricate plot and character". The third was identified as "a very simple plot and a very simple characterization, with a didactic moral twist". Konadu's works contained two or more of these strategies. Konadu started his own publishing company after the overthrow of Ghana's first president Kwame Nkrumah in 1966. He had already written and published two books before that time, one of which called Come Back Dora (1966) sold fifty thousand copies and brought him into the limelight. Konadu's works draw on Ghanaian rural life and traditional practices of mostly Akan culture. He wrote a few popular fiction works under his Kwabena Asare Bediako pseudonym.

Konadu's novel A Woman in Her Prime, published in Heinemann's African Writers Series, was reviewed by the Australian Broadcasting Corporation in 1969. As a guest of the United States State Department in 1972, he was interviewed by the Voice of America (VOA).

He published textbooks for schools in Ghana on behalf of the government. He also published popular literature from his own imprint, Anowuo Educational Publications, under the name Kwabena Asare Bediako.

== Publications ==
- Wizard of Asamang, Accra, Ghana: Waterville Pub. House, 1964
- The Lawyer Who Bungled His Life, Accra: Waterville Pub. House, 1965
- Come Back Dora: a husband's confession and ritual, Accra: Anowuo Educational Publications, 1966
- Shadow of Wealth, Accra, Anowuo Educational Publications, 1966
- (as Kwabena Asare Bediako) Don't Leave me MERCY, Anowuo Educational Publications, 1966
- (as Kwabena Asare Bediako) A Husband for Esi Ellua, Anowuo Educational Publications, 1967
- A Woman in Her Prime, 1967. African Writers Series 40. London: Heinemann.
- Night Watchers of Korlebu, Accra: Anowuo Educational Publications, 1967
- Ordained by the Oracle, 1969. African Writers Series 55. London: Heinemann.
- Devils in Waiting , Accra : Anowuo Educational Publications, 1989
- The Coup Makers, Accra : S.A. Konadu; 1994.

Currently, his titles are being published by Adaex Educational Publications.
