= Kojo Laing =

Ghanaian novelist and poet (1946–2017)

- Born: Bernard Ebenezer Laing; 1 July 1946; Kumasi, Gold Coast
- Died: 20 April 2017 (aged 70); Accra, Ghana
- Other names: B. Kojo Laing; Bernard Kojo Laing
- Education: Bonhill Primary School; Vale of Leven Academy; Glasgow University
- Occupations: Novelist, poet
- Notable work: Search Sweet Country (1986); Woman of the Aeroplanes (1988)

B. Kojo Laing or Bernard Kojo Laing (1 July 1946 – 20 April 2017) was a Ghanaian novelist and poet, whose writing is characterised by its hybridity, whereby he uses Ghanaian Pidgin English and vernacular languages alongside standard English. His first two novels in particular – Search Sweet Country (1986) and Woman of the Aeroplanes (1988) – were praised for their linguistic originality, both books including glossaries that feature the author's neologisms as well as Ghanaian words.

== Early life and career ==
Laing was born in Kumasi, capital of Ghana's Ashanti region, the eldest son and fourth of the six children of George Ekyem Ferguson Laing (an Anglican priest who became the first African rector of the Anglican Theological College in Ashanti) and Darling Egan. Baptized as Bernard Ebenezer, he later stopped using his English Christian name, favouring his African identity instead. After some early education in Accra, Laing in 1957 went to continue his primary and secondary schooling in Scotland, attending Bonhill Primary School and the Vale of Leven Academy in Alexandria, Dunbartonshire.

He graduated from Glasgow University in 1968 with a master's degree, before returning to Ghana with his Scottish wife Josephine and their three children. Joining the civil service, he remained there until 1979. He subsequently worked for five years as an administrative secretary of the Institute of African Studies at the University of Ghana, Legon, and in 1984 became head of Saint Anthony's School in Accra, which had been established by his mother.

== Writing ==
Laing emerged as a poet in the 1970s, with work "occasionally drawing on the techniques of surrealism", but received significant attention only with the appearance his first novel, Search Sweet Country, which was published in 1986 to critical acclaim, and won prizes including the Valco Award and the Ghana Book Award.

Search Sweet Country was reissued by McSweeney's in 2012, with an Introduction by Binyavanga Wainaina. Reviewing it in The Slate Book Review, Uzodinma Iweala writes: "Reading Search Sweet Country is like reading a dream, and indeed at times it feels like the magical landscapes of writers like the Nigerian Ben Okri or the Mozambican Mia Couto. Each page delivers an intense blast of vivid imagery, a world in which landscapes come to life when inanimate objects receive human characterization.... Laing ... is a master stylist, and Search Sweet Country delivers an absorbing, if demanding, world for both its characters and the reader." Publishers Weekly called it an "intricate, beautifully rambling novel ... a compelling and rewarding read", while the reviewer for the Pittsburgh Post-Gazette observed: "'Search Sweet Country' can be read over and over, continually surprising with a fresh turn of phrase or nuance in character, always engaging, always beautiful. The search is worthwhile."

Laing's second novel, Woman of the Aeroplanes, was published in 1988, and has drawn comparison with the work of Ayi Kwei Armah. Laing published two further novels: Major Gentl and Achimota Wars (1992), which also won a Valco Award in 1993, and Big Bishop Roko and the Altar Gangsters (2006).

His poetry collection, Godhorse, was published in 1989. Laing also wrote short stories, one of which – "Vacancy for the Post of Jesus Christ" – was included in The Heinemann Book of Contemporary African Stories (1992; edited by Chinua Achebe and C. L. Innes), and has been described as "a wonderful, surreal piece of allegorical science fantasy".

== Later years ==
Laing lived in Accra and, from 2005, devoted himself full-time to writing.

He died in Accra aged 70 on 20 April 2017, survived by his first wife and nine children and his second wife and three children. Tributes in The Johannesburg Review of Books noted that Laing was "painfully underappreciated in his lifetime" and called him "one of the unsung heroes of African fiction".

== Awards ==
- 1976: National Poetry Prize Valco Award
- 1985: National Novel Prize, Ghana Association of Writers
- 1993: Valco Award

== Bibliography ==
- Search Sweet Country (novel), Heinemann, 1986; 2011, ISBN 978-0435045708. With an Introduction by Binyavanga Wainaina, McSweeney's Publishing, 2012, ISBN 978-1936365227.
- Woman of the Aeroplanes (novel), Heinemann, 1988; reissued 2011, with an Introduction by Ellah Allfrey, ISBN 978-0435045722
- Godhorse (poetry), Heinemann African Writers Series, 1989. ISBN 978-0435905521
- Major Gentl and Achimota Wars (novel), Heinemann African Writers Series, 1992. ISBN 978-0435909789
- Big Bishop Roko and the Altar Gangsters (novel), Woeli Publishing Services, 2006. ISBN 978-9988626501
