= Mary Ashun =

Ghanaian-Canadian educator, author, and researcher

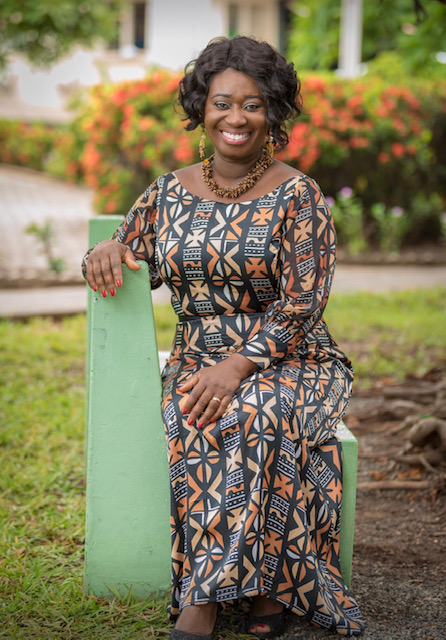
- Born: Mary Asabea Apea; 1968 (age 57–58); Accra, Ghana
- Other names: Asabea Ashun; Abena Apea
- Education: University of East London; University of Toronto; University at Buffalo
- Occupations: Educationalist; Author; Academic Researcher

Mary Asabea Ashun (born 1968) is a Ghanaian-Canadian educator, author and researcher; she is principal of Ghana International School in Accra, Ghana.

== Education ==
Mary Ashun was born in Accra, Ghana, in 1968 as Mary Asabea Apea to Emmanuel Apea, former diplomat with the Commonwealth Secretariat in London and UN Ambassador and Coordinator to Nigeria and ECOWAS, and Emma Elizabeth Apea (née Appiah) a teacher.

She holds a BSc in combined science from the University of East London (UK), a B.Ed. in secondary education from University of Toronto and a PhD in biochemistry from SUNY Buffalo, NY.

== Academic career ==
Ashun was principal of Philopateer Christian College in Toronto, Canada, and a professor in the Faculty of Education at Redeemer University College in Canada.

In 2014, Ashun was awarded a Klingenstein School Heads Fellowship at the Teacher's College, Columbia University. Also in 2019, she was elected as a board member of the Association of International Schools in Africa.

In May 2011, Ashun was awarded a $200,000 Canadian International Development Agency (CIDA) grant from Redeemer University to work on literacy development and Business growth in Asamankese, Ghana. Together with a team of students and adult volunteers, the literacy program for women grew into a primary school for children in the village of Asamankese. The school has since graduated its first group of Yr 6 students into Middle School at His Majesty's Christian School in Asamankese. It is a quality low-cost education option for parents in the Asamankese area.

In January 2013, she organised TEDxSixteenMileCreek under the topic "RE-Imagine"

Her research work has been published in both academic and non-academic journals, exploring subjects such as how adults learn mathematics and her experience of being a black faculty member in a predominantly white teaching environment.

== Writing career ==
Ashun is also an author, writing under two pseudonyms – Asabea Ashun and Abena Apea. She has written several books for children and young adults across various genres, from short stories to science fiction books for children.

Her first novel Rain on My Leopard Spots (now published as Tuesday's Child) was a quarterfinalist in the 2010 Amazon/Penguin Writing Contest, and her second novel The Expatriate (now published as Mistress of The Game) was a quarterfinalist in the 2011 Amazon/Penguin Writing Contest.

From September 2011 to February 2012, Ashun was the creator and host of a literacy show on Rogers TV, Mississauga called Book 'Em TV.

Ashun has written scripts and produced stage adaptations including the DreamWorks musical, The Prince of Egypt, which was performed by her Ghana International School students at the National Theatre of Ghana.

== Personal life ==
Mary is married to Joseph Ashun, who is an engineer and together they have three sons and are currently residing in Toronto, Canada and Accra, Ghana.
