= Empi Baryeh =

Ghanaian writer

Empi Baryeh (born 18 September) is a Ghanaian-born contemporary romance novelist who is currently an assistant registrar of the University of Ghana.

== Biography ==
Baryeh began her writing career at the age of 13 after coming across an uncompleted young adult story her sister had started. Her interest drove her to complete writing her sister's story.

Baryeh is married with two children.

== Selected works ==
- 2012: Most Eligible Bachelor
- 2015: Chancing Faith
- Forest Girl
- His Inherited Princess

== Awards ==
- Ufere Award for 2017 Book of the year
