= Amu Djoleto =

Ghanaian writer and educator (born 1929)

Solomon Alexander Amu Djoleto (born 22 July 1929) is a Ghanaian writer and educator.

== Life and career ==
Amu Djoleto was born at Manyakpogunor, Manya Krobo, Ghana, the son of Frederick Badu, a Presbyterian minister, and Victoria Shome Tetteh, "a modest trader". He was educated at Accra Academy and St. Augustine's College, Cape Coast before reading English at the University of Ghana. He joined Ghana's Ministry of Education in the 1960s as a teacher and education officer. After studying textbook production at the Institute of Education, University of London, he returned to Ghana to edit the Ghana Teachers' Journal. At one point heading the Ministry of Education's publishing programme, he has continued to work for the Ministry of Education.

Djoleto contributed to the poetry anthologies Voices of Ghana (1958) and Messages (1970), and his poems were collected in Amid the Swelling Act. He is best known for his novels, the first of which was The Strange Man (1967).

== Works ==
=== Novels ===
- The Strange Man, London, Heinemann, 1967. African Writers Series, no. 41.
- Money Galore, London [etc.]: Heinemann, 1975. African Writers Series, no. 160.
- Hurricane of Dust, 1987

=== Poetry ===
- Amid the Swelling Act, 1992

=== Children's books ===
- Obodai Sai, 1990
- Twins in Trouble, 1991
- The Frightened Thief, 1992
- The Girl who Knows about Cars, 1996
- Kofi Loses his Way, 1996
- Akos and the Fire Ghost, 1998

=== Other ===
- English practice for the African student, 1967
- (ed. with T. H. S. Kwami) West African Prose, Heinemann Educational Books, 1972.
- The Ghana Book Development Council: aims and objectives, 1976
- Books and reading in Ghana, 1985
