= Jayne Cortez =

American jazz poet, spoken-word artist (1934–2012)

- Born: Sallie Jayne Richardson; May 10, 1934; Fort Huachuca, Arizona, U.S.
- Died: December 28, 2012 (aged 78) Manhattan, New York, U.S.
- Genres: Avant-garde jazz, free jazz
- Occupations: Jazz poet; spoken-word artist; writer; small press publisher
- Years active: 1964–2012
- Labels: Strata-East, Verve
- Spouse(s): Ornette Coleman (m. 1954–1964, div.); Melvin Edwards (m. 1975)
- Children: Denardo Coleman

Jayne Cortez (May 10, 1934 – December 28, 2012) was an African-American poet, activist, small press publisher and spoken-word performance artist. Her writing is part of the canon of the Black Arts Movement. She was married to jazz saxophonist Ornette Coleman from 1954 to 1964, and their son is jazz drummer Denardo Coleman. In 1975, Cortez married painter, sculptor, and printmaker Melvin Edwards, and they lived in Dakar, Senegal, and New York City.

== Biography ==
Jayne Cortez was born Sallie Jayne Richardson on the Army base at Fort Huachuca, Arizona, on May 10, 1934. Her father was a career soldier who served in both world wars; her mother was a secretary. Cortez was the second-born of three children, with an older sister and a younger brother.

At the age of seven, she moved to Los Angeles, where she grew up in the Watts district. Young Jayne Richardson reveled in the jazz and Latin recordings that her parents collected. She studied art, music and drama in high school. Later she attended Compton Community College, but dropped out of her course work due to financial difficulties.^{[11]} She took the surname Cortez, the maiden name of her Filipino maternal grandmother, early in her artistic career.

In 1954, Cortez married jazz saxophonist Ornette Coleman when she was 20 years old. Their son Denardo, born in 1956, began drumming with his father while still a child and devoted his adult life to collaborating with both parents in their respective careers. In 1964, Cortez divorced Coleman and founded the Watts Repertory Theater Company, of which she served as artistic director until 1970.

Active in the struggle for civil rights, she collaborated with famous civil rights activist Fannie Lou Hamer and strongly advocated using art as a vehicle to push political causes, with her work being used to register black voters in Mississippi in the early 1960s. When reflecting on this time in a 1990 interview with D. H. Melhem, Cortez spoke of its influences on her work, saying: "Being unemployed and without food can make you very sad. But you weren't the problem. The problem existed before you knew there was a problem. The problem is the system, and you can organize, unify, and do something about the system. That's what I learned." She traveled throughout Europe and Africa, and moved to New York City in 1967.

In 1969, her first poetry collection, titled Pissstained Stairs and the Monkey Man's Wares, was published and Cortez went on to become the author of 11 other books of poems, and performed her poetry with music on nine recordings. Most of her work was issued under the auspices of Bola Press, a publishing company she founded in 1971. From 1977 to 1983, Cortez was an English teacher for Rutgers University.^{[3]} She presented her work and ideas at universities, museums, and festivals in Africa, Asia, Europe, South America, the Caribbean and the United States. Her poems have been translated into 28 languages and widely published in anthologies, journals and magazines, including Mother Jones, Postmodern American Poetry (1994), Daughters of Africa (1992), Poems for the Millennium, and The Jazz Poetry Anthology.

In 1975, she married sculptor and printmaker Melvin Edwards, and they lived in Dakar, Senegal, and New York City. Their creative collaborations had begun in the late 1960s, his artwork illustrating her publications, from her Bola Press editions onwards, as well as some of her album covers. Cortez and Edwards maintained two residences, one in New York City and one in Dakar, Senegal, which Cortez said "really feels like home".

Cortez died of heart failure in Manhattan, New York, on December 28, 2012, aged 78.

== Poetry and performance ==
The musicians with whom Cortez aligned herself reflected the sociopolitical and cultural elements to which she attached the greatest importance. Born in Fort Huachuca, Arizona, in 1934, she grew up near Los Angeles under the spell of her parents' jazz and blues record collection, which also included examples of Latin American dance bands and field recordings of indigenous American music. Raised in a musically artistic household, in "some of her poems about musicians, Cortez addresses the dark side of a life in music, exploring the addiction and loneliness that many believe are inherently linked to a life in the performing arts."^{[3]} Early exposure to the recordings of Bessie Smith instilled in Cortez a deeply etched sense of female identity, which, combined with a strong will, shaped her into an uncommonly outspoken individual. She became transformed by the sounds of Duke Ellington, Sarah Vaughan, Charlie Parker, Dizzy Gillespie, and no-nonsense vocalist Dinah Washington, whose visceral approach to self-expression clearly encouraged the poet not to pull any punches. In 1997, Cortez described herself to The Weekly Journal in London as "very much a jazz poet", in that she tried to reflect the fullness of the black experience, saying: "Jazz isn't just one type of music, it's an umbrella that covers the history of black people from African drumming to field hollers and the blues."

Cortez, who respected the memory of independent performing artist Josephine Baker, preferred to name inspirations rather than influences, especially when discussing writers. Those with whom she identified included Langston Hughes, Aimé Césaire, Léon Damas, Christopher Okigbo, Henry Dumas, Amiri Baraka, and Richard Wright. Parallels with the ugly/beautiful poetics of Federico García Lorca also suggest themselves. Her words were usually written, chanted, and spoken in rhythmic repetition that resembled the intricate, tactile language of African and Caribbean drumming.

Most of her work from the early 1970s onwards was issued by Bola Press, the publishing company she founded. One of these early works, Festivals and Funerals (1971), while not as well known as Pissstained stairs and the Monkey Man's Wares, is considered significant for how much it derives from Cortez's personal experiences, as well as featuring "the voices of ordinary working people confronting social issues and weighing their role in fighting for change."^{[3]} She cut her first album, Celebrations and Solitudes, at White Plains, New York, in 1974. A set of duets with bassist Richard Davis, it was released on the Strata-East label. The first Bola Press recording, taped in October 1979, was called Unsubmissive Blues and included a piece "For the Brave Young Students in Soweto". Cortez delivered her poetry backed by an electro-funk modern jazz group called the Firespitters, built around a core of guitarist Bern Nix, bassist Al McDowell, and drummer Denardo Coleman. For years, the Firespitters and Ornette Coleman's Prime Time coexisted, with Denardo as the axis, and various players participated in both units.

During the summer of 1982, Cortez delivered There It Is, an earthshaking album containing several pieces that truly define her artistry. These include: "I See Chano Pozo", a joyously evocative salute to Dizzy Gillespie's legendary Cuban percussionist (whom she saw at a concert in Wrigley Field, Los Angeles, when she was 14); a searing indictment of patriarchal violence called "If the Drum Is a Woman", and "US/Nigerian Relations", which consists of the sentence "They want the oil/but they don't want the people" chanted dervish-like over an escalating, electrified free jazz blowout. Recorded in 1986, her next album, Maintain Control, is especially memorable for Ornette Coleman's profoundly emotive saxophone on "No Simple Explanations", the unsettling "Deadly Radiation Blues", and the harshly gyrating "Economic Love Song", which is another of her tantrum-like repetition rituals, this time built around the words "Military spending, huge profits and death."

Among several subsequent albums Cheerful & Optimistic (1994) stands out for the use of an African kora player and poignant currents of wistfulness during "Sacred Trees" and "I Wonder Who". Additionally, this album contains a convincing ode to anti-militarism in "War Devoted to War" and the close-to-the-marrow mini-manifestos "Samba Is Power" and "Find Your Own Voice". In 1996, her album Taking the Blues Back Home was released on Harmolodic/Verve; Borders of Disorderly Time, which appeared in 2002, featured guest artists Bobby Bradford, Ron Carter, and James Blood Ulmer.

Cortez appeared on screen in the films Women in Jazz and Poetry in Motion by Ron Mann.

Her impact upon the development of spoken-word performance art during the late 20th century has yet to be intelligently recognized. In some ways her confrontational political outspokenness and dead-serious cathartic performance technique place Cortez in league with Judith Malina and The Living Theater. According to the online African-American Registry, "her ability to push the acceptable limits of expression to address issues of race, sex and homophobia place her in a category that few other women occupy."

Firespitter: The Collected Poems of Jayne Cortez (Nightboat Books, 2025), "a publication anticipated for over a decade", gathers together poems from 1969 to 2012, the year of Cortez's death, edited and introduced by Margaret Busby, with a foreword by Sapphire, LA Taco selected the collection as one of "The 25 Best L.A.-Centric Books Of 2025", and stated: "At just over 640 pages, this book cements the legacy of Jayne Cortez as one of the greatest poets to ever come out of Los Angeles." Reviewing the volume for The Brooklyn Rail, Macaella Gray described it as "a physical reminder of the poet’s prolific output and her claim to be counted among the Black Arts Movement’s defining voices", concluding: "As Cortez once positioned her circle into magnitude, so the framing of Firespitter elevates her: larger than life, a poet whose convictions would not be quarantined in the private sphere but were borne, unflinching, uncompromisingly into public space, uncensored and urgent to revisit now."

== Organization of Women Writers of Africa ==
In 1991, along with Ghanaian writer Ama Ata Aidoo, Cortez co-founded the Organization of Women Writers of Africa (OWWA), and served as its president for many years thereafter, with board members including J. e. Franklin, Cheryll Y. Greene, Rashidah Ismaili, and Louise Meriwether, Maya Angelou, Rosamond S. King, Margaret Busby, Gabrielle Civil, Alexis De Veaux, LaTasha N. Diggs, Zetta Elliott, Donette Francis, Paula Giddings, Renée Larrier, Tess Onwueme, Coumba Touré, Maryse Condé, Nancy Morejón, and Sapphire.

=== Yari Yari ===
In 1997, OWAA organized at New York University "the first major international conference devoted to the evaluation and celebration of literature from around the world by women of African descent". Cortez directed Yari Yari: Black Women Writers and the Future (1999), which documented panels, readings and performances held during that conference. She was also organizer of Slave Routes: The Long Memory (2000) and Yari Yari Pamberi: Black Women Writers Dissecting Globalization (2004), both international conferences held at New York University.

Until shortly before her death, Cortez had been planning an OWAA international symposium of women writers to be held in Accra, Ghana. Yari Yari Ntoaso: Continuing the Dialogue took place as scheduled, in her honour, May 16–19, 2013. The many international scholars and writers participating included Ama Ata Aidoo, Esi Sutherland-Addy, Margaret Busby, Kuukua Dzigbordi Yormekpe, Amma Darko, Ruby Goka, Mamle Kabu, Angela Davis, Natalia Molebatsi, Yolanda Arroyo Pizarro, Sapphire, Veronique Tadjo, Évelyne Trouillot, Tess Onwueme, and others.

== Tributes ==
A memorial celebration of her life, organised by her family on February 6, 2013, at the Cooper Union Foundation Building, included tributes by Amiri Baraka, Danny Glover, Robin Kelley, Genna Rae McNeil, Quincy Troupe, Steve Dalachinsky, George Campbell Jr., Eugene Redmond, Rashidah Ismaili, and Manthia Diawara, as well as musical contributions by Randy Weston, T. K. Blue and The Firespitters.

The Spring 2013 issue of The Black Scholar (Vol. 43, No. 1/2) was dedicated to Cortez's memory and work.

In London, England, on July 19, 2013, a tribute event was held, with featured artists including John Agard, Jean "Binta" Breeze, Denardo Coleman, Zena Edwards, Linton Kwesi Johnson, Grace Nichols, Deirdre Pascall, Keith Waithe, Margaret Busby, and others.

On October 8, 2025, on the publication of Firespitter: The Collected Poems of Jayne Cortez, a celebration was held at St. Mark's Church, New York City, featuring a performance by Cortez's band, The Firespitters, with her son Denardo Coleman on drums, and readings by LaTasha N. Nevada Diggs, Lois Griffith, Kyle Carrero Lopez, Aja Monet, Tracie Morris, Quincy Troupe, t'ai freedom ford, Rosamond S. King, Tangie Mitchell, Jessica Care Moore, Fred Moten and Brandon Lopez, and Anne Waldman.

On November 5, 2025, "Poetry &: Firespitter, a Jayne Cortez Celebration", co-presented with OWWA, took place at Dia Chelsea, with participants including Denardo Coleman, Melvin Edwards, Massiel Alfonso, LaTasha N. Nevada Diggs, J.e. Franklin, Rashidah Ismaili, Rosamond S. King, and Fay Victor.

== Selected awards ==
- 1970, Rockefeller Foundation grant
- 1980, American Book Award for Mouth on Paper
- 1987, National Endowment for the Arts
- 1994, Fannie Lou Hamer Award
- 1996, Arts International Award
- International African Festival Award
- 2001, Langston Hughes Medal
- New York Foundation for the Arts

== Poetry books ==
- Pissstained Stairs and the Monkey Man's Wares. Phrase Text. 1969. 52 pp. Drawings by Melvin Edwards.
- Festivals and Funerals. Bola Press. 1971. 44pp. Drawings by Melvin Edwards.
- Scarifications. Bola Press. 1973. 64pp. Drawings by Melvin Edwards.
- Mouth on Paper. Bola Press. 1977. 63pp. Drawings by Melvin Edwards.
- Firespitter. Bola Press. 1982. 47pp. Drawings by Melvin Edwards.
- With Ted Joans, Merveilleux Coup de Foudre [1982], in French, translated by Ms. Ila Errus and M. Sila Errus, Paris: Handshake Editions.
- Coagulations: New and Selected Poems. New York: Thunder's Mouth Press. 1984. 112pp. UK: Pluto, 1985, ISBN 978-0-7453-0078-8
- Poetic Magnetic: Poems from Everywhere Drums & Maintain Control. Bola Press. 1991. ISBN 978-0-9608062-6-3. 64pp.
- Fragments: Sculpture and Drawings from the "Lynch Fragment" Series by Melvin Edwards, with the Poetry of Jayne Cortez. Bola Press. 1994. ISBN 1852424222. 32pp.
- Somewhere in Advance of Nowhere. Serpent's Tail/High Risk Books. 1997. ISBN 1852424222. 122pp.
- Jazz Fan Looks Back. Hanging Loose Press. 2002. ISBN 978-1-931236-10-2. 115pp.
- The Beautiful Book. Bola Press. 2007. ISBN 9780960806287. 104pp.
- On the Imperial Highway: New and Selected Poems. Hanging Loose Press. 2009. ISBN 978-1-931236-99-7. 131pp.
- Firespitter: The Collected Poems of Jayne Cortez (Nightboat Books, 2025), ISBN 9781643622323. Drawings by Melvin Edwards.

== Discography ==
- Celebrations & Solitudes: The Poetry of Jayne Cortez & Richard Davis, Bassist (Strata-East, 1974)
- Unsubmissive Blues (Bola Press, 1979)
- Poets Read their Contemporary Poetry: Before Columbus Foundation (Smithsonian Folkways, 1980)
- Life is a Killer (compilation on Giorno Poetry Systems, 1982)
- There It Is (Bola Press, 1982)
- Maintain Control (Bola Press, 1986)
- Everywhere Drums (Bola Press, 1990)
- Poetry & Music: Women in (E)Motion Festival (Tradition & Moderne Musikproducktion, Germany, 1992)
- Cheerful & Optimistic (Bola Press, 1994)
- Taking the Blues Back Home (Harmolodic/Verve, 1996)
- Borders of Disorderly Time (Bola Press, 2002)
- Find Your Own Voice: Poetry and Music, 1982–2003 (Bola Press, 2004)
- As If You Knew (Bola Press, 2011)

== Videos ==
- Tribeca TV Series (David J. Burke, 1993)
- I'm Gonna Shake (Sanctuary TV, 2010)
- She Got He Got (Sanctuary TV, 2010)
- Find Your Own Voice (Sanctuary TV, 2010)

== Filmography ==
- Poetry in Motion (1982)
- Ornette: Made in America (1985)
- Yari Yari: Black Women Writers and the Future (1999)
- Femmes du Jazz/Women in Jazz (2000)
