= Ama Ata Aidoo =

Ghanaian writer and politician (1942–2023)

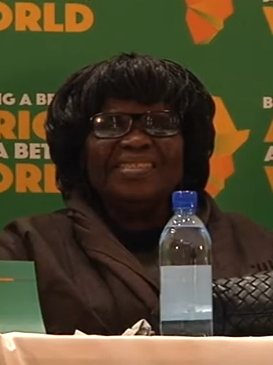
- Aidoo in 2016
- Born: Christina Ama Ata Aidoo; 23 March 1942; Abeadzi Kyiakor, Gold Coast (now Ghana)
- Died: 31 May 2023 (aged 81); Accra, Ghana
- Education: Wesley Girls' High School; University of Ghana (BA)
- Occupations: Author; playwright; professor
- Writing career
- Genres: Drama; fiction; poetry
- Subjects: Comparative literature; postcolonial literature
- Notable works: The Dilemma of a Ghost (1965); Anowa (1970); Our Sister Killjoy (1977); Changes (1991)
- Notable awards: Commonwealth Writers' Prize; 1992

Ama Ata Aidoo (23 March 1942 – 31 May 2023) was a Ghanaian author, poet, playwright, politician, and academician. She was the Secretary for Education in Ghana from 1982 to 1983 under Jerry Rawlings's PNDC administration.

Aidoo's first play, The Dilemma of a Ghost, was published in 1965, making her the first published female African dramatist. As a novelist, she was a finalist for the Commonwealth Writers' Prize in 1992 with the novel Changes. In 2000, she established the Mbaasem Foundation in Accra to promote and support the work of African women writers.

== Early life ==
Christina Ama Ata Aidoo was born on 23 March, 1942 in Abeadzi Kyiakor, near Saltpond, in the Central Region of Ghana. She was initially called Christiana Ama Aidoo. Some sources ( including Megan Behrent, Brown University, and Africa Who's Who) have stated that she was born on 31st March. She had a twin brother, Kwame Ata.

Aidoo was raised in a Fante royal household, the daughter of Nana Yaw Fama, chief of Abeadzi Kyiakor, and Maame Abasema. Her grandfather was murdered by neocolonialists, which brought her father's attention to the importance of educating the children and families of the village on the history and events of the era. This led him to open up the first school in their village and influenced Aidoo to attend Wesley Girls' High School, where she first decided she wanted to be a writer.

Aidoo later credited her years at Wesley Girls' High School in Cape Coast with nurturing her early interest in literature.

== Education ==
From 1957, Aidoo attended Wesley Girls' Senior High School in Cape Coast. After high school, she enrolled at the University of Ghana, Legon, in 1961 where she obtained the degree of Bachelor of Arts in English and wrote her first play, The Dilemma of a Ghost, in 1964. The play was published by Longman the following year, making Aidoo the first published female African dramatist.

== Career ==
After graduating, Aidoo held a fellowship in creative writing at Stanford University in California before returning to Ghana in 1969 to teach English at the University of Ghana. She served as a research fellow at the Institute of African Studies there and as a lecturer in English at the University of Cape Coast, where she eventually rose to the position of professor.

Aidoo was appointed Minister of Education under the Provisional National Defence Council in 1982. She resigned after 18 months, realizing that she would be unable to achieve her aim of making education in Ghana freely accessible to all. She has portrayed the role of African women in contemporary society. She has opined that the idea of nationalism has been deployed by recent leaders as a means of keeping people oppressed. She criticized those literate Africans who profess to love their country but are seduced by the benefits of the developed world. She believed in a distinct African identity, which she viewed from a female perspective. She held strong Pan-Africanist views on the necessity of unity among African countries and was outspoken about the centuries of exploitation of Africa's resources and peoples by western powers.

In 1983, she moved to live in Zimbabwe, where she continued her work in education, including as a curriculum developer for the Zimbabwe Ministry of Education, as well as writing. While in Harare, she published a collection of poems in 1985, Someone Talking to Sometime, and wrote a children's book entitled The Eagle and the Chickens and Other Stories (1986).

In London, England, in 1986, she delivered the Walter Rodney Visions of Africa lecture organized by the support group of Bogle-L'Ouverture publishing house.

Aidoo received a Fulbright Scholarship award in 1988, was writer-in-residence at the University of Richmond, Virginia in 1989, and taught various English courses at Hamilton College in Clinton New York in the early mid-1990s.

In 1991, she and African-American poet Jayne Cortez established and co-chaired the Organization of Women Writers of Africa (OWWA), and board members of OWWA have included J. E. Franklin, Cheryll Y. Greene, Rashidah Ismaili, Louise Meriwether, Maya Angelou, Rosamond S. King, Margaret Busby, Gabrielle Civil, Alexis De Veaux, LaTasha N. Diggs, Zetta Elliott, Donette Francis, Paula Giddings, Renée Larrier, Tess Onwueme, Coumba Touré, Maryse Condé, Nancy Morejón, and Sapphire.

From 2004 to 2011, Aidoo was a visiting professor in the Africana Studies Department at Brown University.

She chaired the Ghana Association of Writers Book Festival from its inception in 2011.

Aidoo was a patron of the Etisalat Prize for Literature (alongside Dele Olojede, Ellah Wakatama Allfrey, Margaret Busby, Sarah Ladipo Manyika, and Zakes Mda), created in 2013 as a platform for African writers of debut novels of fiction.

At Yari Yari Ntoaso: Continuing the Dialogue, the symposium of African writers held in Accra, Ghana, in 2013, Aidoo was a plenary speaker, alongside Angela Davis and others.

== Writings ==
Aidoo's plays include The Dilemma of a Ghost, produced at Legon in 1964 (first published in 1965) and Pittsburgh in 1988, and Anowa, published in 1971 and produced at the Gate Theatre in London in 1991.

Her works of fiction particularly deal with the tension between Western and African worldviews. Her first novel, Our Sister Killjoy, was published in 1977 and remains one of her most popular works. It is notable for portraying a dissenting perspective on sexuality in Africa, and especially LGBT in Africa. Whereas one popular idea on the continent is that homosexuality is alien to Africa and an intrusion of ideas of Western culture into a pure, inherently heterosexual "African" culture, Aidoo portrays the main character of Killjoy as indulging in lesbian fantasies of her own, and maintaining sympathetic relationships with lesbian characters.

Many of Aidoo's other protagonists are also women who defy the stereotypical women's roles of their time, as in her play Anowa. Her novel Changes: A Love Story won the 1992 Commonwealth Writers' Prize for Best Book (Africa). She was also an accomplished poet—her collection Someone Talking to Sometime won the Nelson Mandela Prize for Poetry in 1987—and the author of several children's books.

Aidoo contributed the piece "To be a woman" to the 1984 anthology Sisterhood Is Global: The International Women's Movement Anthology, edited by Robin Morgan. Her story "Two Sisters" appears in the 1992 anthology Daughters of Africa, edited by Margaret Busby.

In 2000, Aidoo founded the Mbaasem Foundation, a non-governmental organization based in Ghana with a mission "to support the development and sustainability of African women writers and their artistic output", which she ran together with her daughter Kinna Likimani and a board of management.

Aidoo was editor of the anthology African Love Stories (Ayebia, 2006), a collection of 21 stories by writers including Chika Unigwe, Chimamanda Ngozi Adichie, Doreen Baingana, Nawal El Saadawi, Helen Oyeyemi, Leila Aboulela, Molara Ogundipe, Monica Arac de Nyeko, Sarah Ladipo Manyika, Sefi Atta, Sindiwe Magona, and Véronique Tadjo. In 2012, Aidoo published Diplomatic Pounds & Other Stories, a compilation of short stories.

== Death ==
Aidoo died on 31 May 2023 in Accra, aged 81. Praising her as "an outstanding writer, advocate for women's cause, the cause of Africans and the progressive people around the world", President Nana Akufo-Addo announced that she would be given a state funeral, with rites held from 13 July to 16 July, On 13 July, her funeral took place in the forecourt of the State House, followed by lying-in-state at her home town of Abeadze Kyiakor on 15 July, and a thanksgiving church service and burial on Sunday, 16 July.

According to a tribute from the Caine Prize council, Aidoo had been working on a new novel for some years before her death.

== Honours and recognition ==
Aidoo received several awards throughout her career, including winning the Mbari Club prize in 1962 for her short story "No Sweetness Here", and the 1992 Commonwealth Writers' Prize for Best Book (Africa) for her novel Changes.

In 2012, the volume Essays in honour of Ama Ata Aidoo at 70 was published, edited by Anne V. Adams, with contributors including Atukwei Okai, Margaret Busby, Maryse Condé, Micere Mugo, Toyin Falola, Biodun Jeyifo, Kofi Anyidoho, Naana Jane Opoku-Agyemang, Naana Banyiwa Horne, Nana Wilson-Tagoe, Carole Boyce Davies, Emmanuel Akyeampong, James Gibbs, Vincent O. Odamtten, Jane Bryce, Esi Sutherland-Addy, Femi Osofisan, Kwesi Yankah, Abena Busia, Yaba Badoe, Ivor Agyeman-Duah, Chikwenye Okonjo Ogunyemi, Ngugi Wa Thiong'o, Kinna Likimani, and others.

Aidoo was the subject of a 2014 documentary film, The Art of Ama Ata Aidoo, made by Yaba Badoe.

The Aidoo-Snyder Book Prize, awarded by the Women's Caucus of the African Studies Association for an outstanding book published by a woman that prioritizes African women's experiences, is named in honour of Ama Ata Aidoo and of Margaret C. Snyder, who was the founding director of UNIFEM.

In 2016, Aidoo's plays The Dilemma of a Ghost and Anowa were included as African Drama selections in the Cambridge International Examinations.

Launched in March 2017, the Ama Ata Aidoo Centre for Creative Writing (Aidoo Centre), under the auspices of the Kojo Yankah School of Communications Studies at the African University College of Communications (AUCC) in Adabraka, Accra, was named in her honour—the first centre of its kind in West Africa, with Nii Ayikwei Parkes as its director.

== Selected works ==
- The Dilemma of a Ghost (play), Accra: Longman, 1965. New York: Macmillan, 1971.
- Anowa (play based on a Ghanaian legend), London: Longman, 1970. New York: Humanities Press, 1970.
- No Sweetness Here: A Collection of Short Stories, London: Longman, 1970. New York: Doubleday.
- Our Sister Killjoy: or Reflections from a Black-eyed Squint (novel), Longman, 1977.
- Someone Talking to Sometime (poetry collection), Harare: College Press, 1986.
- The Eagle and the Chickens and Other Stories (for children), Enugu: Tana Press, 1986.
- Birds and Other Poems, Harare: College Press, 1987.
- An Angry Letter in January (poems), Coventry: Dangaroo Press, 1992, ISSN 0106-5734
- Changes: A Love Story (novel), London: The Women's Press, 1991. New York: Feminist Press at the City University of New York, 1993.
- The Girl Who Can and Other Stories, Accra: Sub-Saharan Publishers, ISBN 978-0435910136; Heinemann African Writers Series, 1997.
- Diplomatic Pounds & Other Stories, Ayebia Clarke Publishing, 2012, ISBN 978-0956240194.

=== As editor ===
- African Love Stories: An Anthology, Ayebia Clarke Publishing, 2006. ISBN 978-0-9547023-6-6.
