= Mbaasem Foundation =

Ghanaian foundation

- Formation: 2000 (26 years ago)
- Founder: Ama Ata Aidoo
- Founded at: Accra, Ghana
- Type: Non-governmental
- Purpose: To support the development and sustainability of African women writers and their artistic output
- Headquarters: Accra, Ghana
- Website: mbaasem.wordpress.com

The Mbaasem Foundation is a foundation established by Ghanaian writer Ama Ata Aidoo in Accra, Ghana, in 2000. It is a nonprofit foundation dedicated to supporting and promoting the work of African women writers, to "establish and maintain a writing place for women". In 2002, the rented headquarters of the foundation was "likened to the transformation of Ernest Hemingway's home in Chicago into a literary haven and museum". The Foundation states its mission as being "To support the development and sustainability of African women writers and their artistic output", and as its goal: "To create an enabling environment for women to write, tell and publish their stories."

== History ==
In January 2000, Ama Ata Aidoo started an initiative called Mbaasem (meaning "women's words, women's affairs" in Akan) based in Accra, Ghana, with the goal of building a women writers' centre and residency. Subsequently incorporated as a registered non-governmental organization, the Mbaasem Foundation reflects the mission of its founder "to develop and support the sustainability of the work of African women writers who are usually sidelined in the industry".

In 2012, Mbaasem launched a three-year project to develop a literacy manifesto to improve the literacy rate within Ghana. Other activities include organizing the "Mbaasem Writing Contest for Girls", funded by the US Embassy of Ghana and The Royal Bank Ltd, with GHC 1,000 as the top prize.

The Mbaasem Foundation has also been involved in international conferences for women writers. In 2013, it collaborated with the Organization of Women Writers of Africa (OWWA), New York University (NYU), and the Spanish Fundación Mujeres por África (Women for Africa Foundation) to present a major conference in Accra, Yari Yari Ntoaso: Continuing the Dialogue – An International Conference on Literature by Women of African Ancestry, held from 16 to 19 May that year. Ghanaian writers and scholars including Ama Ata Aidoo, Amma Darko, Ruby Goka, Mamle Kabu, Esi Sutherland-Addy and Margaret Busby were invited to speak at the event, and among notable participants from other parts of the world who attended were Angela Davis of the USA, Tess Onwueme of Nigeria, Natalia Molebatsi of South Africa, Yolanda Arroyo Pizarro of Puerto Rico, Véronique Tadjo of Côte d'Ivoire, and Évelyne Trouillot of Haiti.
