= Organization of Women Writers of Africa =

Organization for African women writers

The Organization of Women Writers of Africa (OWWA) is an organization for women writers in Africa. Founded in 1991, the OWWA aims to promote the oral and written literature of African women, and address issues concerning publishing, censorship and human progress.

== Organization ==
The Organization of Women Writers of Africa was established by the Ghanaian writer Ama Ata Aidoo and African-American poet Jayne Cortez in 1991. Board members have included J. E. Franklin, Cheryll Y. Greene, Rashidah Ismaili, Louise Meriwether, Maya Angelou, Rosamond S. King, Margaret Busby, Gabrielle Civil, Alexis De Veaux, LaTasha N. Diggs, Zetta Elliott, Donette Francis, Paula Giddings, Renée Larrier, Tess Onwueme, Coumba Touré, Maryse Condé, Nancy Morejón, and Sapphire.

== Activities and history ==
OWWA has sponsored three "Yari Yari" international conferences for Black women writers. The first, "Yari Yari: Black Women Writers and the Future", was held in 1997. It was "the first major international conference devoted to the evaluation and celebration of literature from around the world by women of African descent". The conference was attended by two thousand women, and participants included Maya Angelou and Edwidge Danticat. Cortez directed Yari Yari: Black Women Writers and the Future (1999), which documented panels, readings and performances held during that conference. A second conference, "Yari Yari Pamberi: Black Women Writers Dissection of Globalization", was held in 2004. It was sponsored by OWWA in association with New York University's Institute of African-American Affairs and African Studies Program. Cortex's statement of welcome announced the ambition of the event:

Black women writers from around the globe have been struggling against poverty, racism, exploitation, gender oppression, censorship and other human rights violations. What we want is to participate in global decisions concerning survival and the future of humanity... We need access to the progress of globalization.

At the time of her death, Cortez had been planning an OWAA symposium of women writers to be held in Accra, Ghana. The event took place as scheduled, in her honour, May 16–19, 2013. Participants, who came from more than a dozen countries, included Angela Davis, Angelique Nixon, Akachi Ezeigbo, Bibi Bakare-Yusuf, Camille Dungy, Eintou Pearl Springer, Évelyne Trouillot, Gina Athena Ulysse, Lola Shoneyin, Monica Arac de Nyeko, Natalia Molebatsi, Véronique Tadjo, Virginia Phiri, Wana Udobang, Wangui wa Goro, Yolanda Arroyo Pizarro, and others.

The organization has also created an ongoing series of videotaped conversations with creative women, and launched a literary literacy project to connect young students to writers.

In October 2011, Maya Angelou delivered an address to the OWWA, in which she used the traditional form of call and response, echoing her childhood in the American South.
