= The Dilemma of a Ghost =

First play by Ama Ata Aidoo (premiered 1964)

- Original language: English
- Written by: Ama Ata Aidoo

Premiere
- Date: 1964; 62 years ago
- Place: University of Ghana, Legon, Ghana

The Dilemma of a Ghost is a play by Ghanaian writer Ama Ata Aidoo that was first performed in March 1964 for three nights at the Open Air Theatre of the University of Ghana, Legon, where the author was in her final year of studies, a few months away from graduating. The play was published by Longman the following year, making Aidoo the first published African woman dramatist. It was subsequently published in an edition with Aidoo's second play, Anowa (1970), both works dealing with the differences between Western culture and African traditions.

A domestic satire, The Dilemma of a Ghost concerns a Ghanaian student returning from education abroad with his Black American wife, and her struggle coming to terms with her cultural past in her new African home. Simon Gikandi writes that the play "is both structurally and thematically related to the traditional dilemma tale. By focusing on the questions and problems of appropriate moral behavior, the dilemma tale invites the audience to adjudicate between conflicting possibilities of action. The drama centers on the problems of childbearing, infidelity, and exogamy that arise when Ato Yawson, the protagonist, returns to Ghana with an Afro-American wife, Eulalie Rush. The consequences of this unannounced marriage symbolize both the private and the public dilemmas of the postcolonial subject and her or his society. ... The ideological and stereotypical assumptions of both Eulalie and her new in-laws give rise to the seemingly irreconcilable encounter between the West (the United States) and Africa (Ghana)."

Mpalive-Hangson Msiska notes that while the play "focuses on the dilemma of a man caught between two histories and two cultures, Aidoo is also concerned with the predicament of women who are not so much caught between cultures and histories as no longer having a place in either world. This double non-belonging, as opposed to split allegiance, might be spoken of as the dilemma of the daughter figure, as opposed to son and mother figures."

== Editions ==
- Christina Ama Ata Aidoo, The Dilemma of a Ghost, Accra, Ghana: Longman, 1965, 50pp. ISBN 9780582608368
- Christina Ama Ata Aidoo, The Dilemma of a Ghost (with an Introduction by Karen C. Chapman), New York: Collier Books, 1971.
- Ama Ata Aidoo, Two Plays: The Dilemma of a Ghost / Anowa, Longman African Classic, 1987, 124pp. ISBN 9780582002449
- Ama Ata Aidoo, The Dilemma of a Ghost and Anowa, Longman African Classic, 1995, 128pp. ISBN 978-0582276024
