= OWWA =

OWWA may refer to:

- Ontario Water Works Association
- Organization of Women Writers of Africa
- Overseas Workers Welfare Administration
