= Awilda Rodríguez Lora =

Puerto Rican performance artist

- Born: 1978 (age 47–48); Veracruz, Mexico
- Education: Columbia College Chicago (MAM, 2009); Hunter College (BA, 2002)
- Occupations: Dancer, performance artist, choreographer, storyteller
- Website: laperformera.org

Awilda Rodríguez Lora is a contemporary Puerto Rican dancer, performance artist, choreographer, and storyteller. Her art focuses on women, sexuality, and self-determination. It also incorporates dialogues of colonial legacies and the identities of race, gender, class, and sexuality. Rodríguez Lora has presented her work throughout North America, South America, and the Caribbean. The artist cites mainstream media as an influence in her work. She is currently the academic director of the Dance Program at the Universidad del Sagrado Corazón in Santurce, a central zone of San Juan. Scholars and curators such as Sarah G. Sharp, Harmony Bench, Lawrence La Fountain-Stokes, Paloma Martinez-Cruz, and Elizabeth Currans have analyzed her work and interviewed her.

== Biography ==
Rodríguez Lora was born in Veracruz, Mexico to Puerto Rican parents who were traveling through the United States and Mexico. Her father studied chiropractic care in New York shortly after Rodríguez Lora was born. Her mother works as a caretaker and an occupational therapist. She has two younger brothers, both of whom were born in Puerto Rico. At the age of 16, Rodríguez Lora began to study dance in Santurce, Puerto Rico. After six months, she was elected to join the studio's company. During her time in the dance company, Rodríguez Lora faced hardships due to her weight and being typecast as a "voluptuous" dancer.

Following their divorce, her mother moved to Florida in search of work. Rodríguez Lora dropped out of college and followed her mother there, where she enrolled in dance classes at Daytona Beach Community College. There, she took her first contemporary dance course which was taught by a pupil of Alvin Ailey. Rodríguez Lora credits this instructor, Kevin Vega, for transforming her relationship with dance and allowing her to be the dancer she now is.

On the advice of Vega, Rodríguez Lora transferred to Hunter College to study dance. In New York City, she choreographed her first solo dance. It was also there that she began to explore her sexuality, queerness, and feminism. Rodríguez Lora earned a Bachelors of Fine Arts degree in Dance with a minor in economics. Upon graduation, she left the city to move to Puerto Rico with her then-girlfriend. After they broke up, Rodríguez Lora was offered a job in New York City, so she returned.

Rodríguez Lora earned a master's degree in arts management from Columbia College Chicago. While in Chicago, Rodríguez Lora choreographed a new piece under the mentorship of Tim Miller. After finishing her degree at Columbia College Chicago, Rodríguez Lora relocated to Oakland, California to live with her partner and partake in an artist residency program based in San Francisco.

After the program, Rodríguez Lora and her partner split up and she moved to Florida to live with her mother. Inspired by the 2010-11 University of Puerto Rico strikes and the media coverage of Ricky Martin's coming out, she moved back to Puerto Rico to create her art there. She has lived in Puerto Rico since 2011. In an interview in the leading Puerto Rican newspaper El Nuevo Día in 2014, Rodríguez-Lora described her experiences as a queer Puerto Rican woman artist as "vivir entre identidades" (living between identities). In 2018, Rodríguez Lora was selected to participate in the Andrew W. Mellon Foundation-funded Puerto Rican Arts Initiative, a response to the ravages of Hurricane Maria that allowed artists to sustain their artistic practices.

== Performances ==
Since 2013, Rodríguez Lora has been performing iterations of a piece entitled La Mujer Maravilla (a Puerto Rican iteration of William Moulton Marston's Wonder Woman as a feminist icon) in which Rodríguez Lora explores motherhood, community, and gender in a diasporic and Caribbean context marked by poverty, financial austerity, and natural disasters, highlighting the concept of "sustento" (sustenance). This project was conceived out of her own desire to become a mother. She created this project as part of a residency program in Carolina, Puerto Rico at Patio Taller, an arts space led by Afro-diasporic siblings Mulowayi Iyaye Nonó and Mapenzi Chibale Nonó, better known as Las Nietas de Nonó.

In 2014, Rodríguez Lora participated in Call & Response, a dynamic of Black Women & Performance at Antioch College curated by Gabrielle Civil featuring the artists Duriel E. Harris, Kenyatta A.C. Hinkle, Rosamond S. King, Wura-Natasha Ogunji, and Miré Regulus. In 2015, she collaborated with disabled artist of color, dancer, and choreographer Barak adé Soleil at the Museum of Contemporary Art Chicago, choreographing the piece Objects are objects. In 2018, Rodríguez Lora was part of a series titled Cuerpxs Radicales: Radical Bodies in Performance at the Brooklyn Museum. In March 2019 and September 2020, she had artists residencies at the Ohio State University, as scholar Paloma Martínez-Cruz has discussed. Since beginning her explorations as La Mujer Maravilla, Rodríguez Lora has also worked on a number of other projects.

== Film production ==
- STILL BLACK: a Portrait of Black Transmen (2008, directed by Kortney Ryan Ziegler, produced by Awilda Rodríguez Lora)

== Grants and awards ==
In 2019, Awilda Rodríguez Lora received a grant for presenting and multidisciplinary works from the National Association of Latino Arts and Culture.

== Scholarly and media reception ==
Rodríguez-Lora has received substantial critical reception, including interviews, scholarly analysis, and coverage in the most important newspaper in Puerto Rico, El Nuevo Día. Rodríguez-Lora is one of the artists featured in Susan Homar and nibia pastrana santiago's anthology Inhabiting the Impossible: Dance and Experimentation in Puerto Rico, which is forthcoming from the University of Michigan Press in 2023. Artist and curator Sarah G. Sharp, dance studies scholar Harmony Bench (Ohio State University), and performance studies scholar Lawrence La Fountain-Stokes (University of Michigan) have interviewed her. La Fountain-Stokes has analyzed Rodríguez-Lora's defining performance series La Mujer Maravilla, giving talks on this topic in 2023 at the University of Toronto, at the Albizu University in San Juan, and at the Latin American Studies Association International Congress in Vancouver, British Columbia. Scholar Guillermo Rebollo-Gil has analyzed La Mujer Maravilla. Latina/o studies scholar Paloma Martínez-Cruz has written on Rodríguez-Lora's 2019 and 2020 residencies and artist talks at the Ohio State University. Women's studies scholar Elizabeth Currans (Eastern Michigan University) has analyzed Rodríguez-Lora's collaboration with performance artist, poet, and educator Gabrielle Civil in an article published in the peer-reviewed journal Obsidian: Literature and Arts in the African Diaspora. Independent curator and scholar Abdiel D. Segarra has written about Rodríguez-Lora in a lengthy piece on the internet, movement, and contemporary dance in Puerto Rico originally published in the magazine of the Instituto de Cultura Puertorriqueña (Institute of Puerto Rican Culture) in September 2017, comparing Rodríguez-Lora's work to that of dancer Noemí Segarra and visual artist, choreographer, and performer Marili Pizarro. Visual artist and journalist Karla Claudio-Betancourt has written about Rodríguez-Lora in relation to other feminist Puerto Rican artists and cultural organizers, including Gisela Rosario Ramos (Macha Colón), María José, Noemí Segarra, Carla Torres Trujillo, and Las Nietas de Nonó.

== See also ==
- Culture of Puerto Rico
- History of women in Puerto Rico
- List of Puerto Ricans
- List of gay, lesbian or bisexual people
- Performance art
- Feminist performance art
