= Diaw =

Diaw is a surname. Notable people with the name include:

- Aminata Diaw (1959–2017), Senegalese academic and political philosopher
- Boris Diaw (born 1982), French basketball player
- Cheik Diaw, Senegalese murderer
- Davide Diaw (born 1992), Italian footballer
- Djibril Diaw (born 1994), Senegalese footballer
- Doudou Diaw (born 1975), Senegalese footballer
- Ibrahim Diaw (born 1979), French-Senegalese handball player
- Ibrahima Diaw (table tennis) (born 1992), Senegalese table tennis player
- Khadim Diaw (born 1998), Senegalese-Mauritanian footballer
- Malick Diaw (born 1979), Malian military personnel and politician
- Mamadou Diaw (born 2001), Senegalese footballer
- Mory Diaw (born 1993), French-Senegalese footballer
- Mouhamadou Diaw (born 1981), Senegalese footballer
- Moustapha Diaw (born 1996), Mauritanian footballer
- Namori Diaw (born 1994), Mauritanian footballer
- Talla Diaw (born 1954), Senegalese wrestler
