= Changes: A Love Story =

1993 novel by Ama Ata Aidoo

- Author: Ama Ata Aidoo
- Language: English
- Publisher: The Feminist Press
- Publication date: 1993
- Publication place: Ghana
- Media type: Print
- Pages: 166
- ISBN: 1-55861-065-0
- Preceded by: Birds and Other Poems
- Followed by: An Angry Letter in January

Changes: a Love Story is a 1991 novel by Ama Ata Aidoo, chronicling a period of the life of a career-centred Ghanaian woman as she divorces her first husband and marries into a polygamist union. It was published by the Feminist Press.

== Setting ==
The novel is set in modern-day Accra.

== Characters ==
Esi Sekyi: Esi is a modern African woman who is highly educated and extremely career-centered. She marries Oko out of gratitude. Oko and their only child, Ogyaanowa, are neglected in favor of Esi's job as a data analyst for the Department of Urban Statistics. After she is raped by Oko, she divorces him and enters into a polygamist marriage with Ali, believing that it holds the freedom she desires. She believes Ali will give her the space she craves as well. Esi does not attend church but holds vague Christian ideals. She does not convert after marrying Ali because religion isn't really important to either of them.

Ali Kondey: A "son of the world" who has had all the advantages in life, Ali is charming and wealthy from owning a successful business. He had a strict Muslim upbringing, but is not devout himself. Before he married Esi, he already had a wife and several children.

Opokuya Dakwa: Esi's best friend, a nurse who also manages a household with a husband and several children. Opokuya also craves more freedom in her marriage though she does not divorce her husband. She is self-described as "fat" and is very opinionated, especially about birth control.

Oko Sekyi: Esi's husband who tries fervently to breathe life into his dying marriage with Esi. He works as a headmaster for a girls' school. Oko believes that Esi spends too much time at work which is the source of his frustrations.

Kubi Dakwa: Opokuya's husband who reveals that he cannot be trusted when he attempts to commit adultery with Esi.

Ogyaanowa Sekyi: Esi's daughter who spends most of her time at Oko's mother's house. She feels neglected by her mother and makes it no secret that she prefers her father.

Fusena Kondey: Ali's first wife who chose marriage and family over her education and career. This results in her feeling of intense disillusionment.

== Synopsis ==
Esi Sekyi approaches Linga HideAways Travel Agency in order to finalize travel arrangements – a task Esi has taken on in the absence of her company's regular secretary. She meets Ali Kondey, the charming owner of the travel agency who assures her that his agency will take care of everything. Esi leaves in her beat-up car and Ali praises Allah for the gift of his woman. Sometime later, Esi's husband Oko forces her to have sex with him, which she regards as the last straw in their already-deteriorating marriage. Esi then goes to work and tries to pull herself together while searching her native tongue – presumably an African dialect – for a word to describe what has just happened. She concludes that although her native language has no word for it, in English it might be called "marital rape."

Esi's best friend, Opokuya, is then introduced, her character standing in fierce contrast to Esi's. Although their marriage is generally happy, Opokuya and her husband, Kubi, frequently argue about who will have the family car for the day. On this particular occasion, Kubi wins and they agree that he will pick Opokuya up at the Hotel Twentieth Century after work. Esi runs into Opokuya in the lobby of that hotel and the two quickly begin a conversation about Esi's decision to leave her husband. The story recounts Ali's friendship and eventual marriage to his college friend Fusena. As they had children, motherhood consumed Fusena's life, forcing her to stop working and temporarily stifling her desire for higher education. Esi and Ali's relationship develops as they become lovers. As Esi finds herself becoming more dependent on Ali's affection, she is disappointed when he fails to visit her for two weeks. When Ali finally reappears, he proposes to Esi, offering her a ring to show that she is "occupied territory."

The marriage negotiations begin as Ali travels to the village where Esi's family lives in order to discuss the marriage. However, his request is denied due to his failure to bring a proper relative to the negotiations. It becomes clear that both Ali's and Esi's families are reluctant to agree to such a union, especially when some of the polygamy traditions have already been breached. Both families eventually agree and Ali and Esi are married in a simple ceremony.

On New Year's Eve, Ali visits Esi before going home and while Ali is there, Oko drives up to Esi's house with their daughter, Ogyaanowa, in tow. The two men fight and Esi bolts, taking Ogyaanowa to Opokuya's house. Esi recounts the events to Opokuya and Kubi, who drives over to Esi's to check on her house, only to find that both men have disappeared. Ali and Esi go on a holiday to Ali's home village, Bamako and they spend their time there like tourists. After they return, Ali becomes more distant, spending more time with his attractive new secretary. Esi spends Christmas alone, taking sleeping pills to rein in her deep sense of abandonment.

On New Year's Day, Ali finally reappears, offering her a new car as a bribe. He then immediately leaves. Esi shows off her new car to Opokuya and offers Opokuya her old car. Ali continues to give Esi bribes as substitutes for his presence. After three years, Esi finally breaks down and tells Ali that their relationship has deteriorated. Opokuya finally picks up her car from Esi's house and leaves. Later, Kubi shows up, supposedly searching for his wife. He begins to kiss Esi and Esi considers sleeping with him but decides that she could betray Opokuya like that. Esi and Ali never divorce, remaining friends and sometimes lovers.

== Title ==
Aidoo stated in a 1993 interview that "the title Changes addresses the issue of a woman's life, her loves, career and so on and how they change." Aidoo also revealed that the subtitle "A Love Story" is a compromise with her publisher – originally the subtitle was "A New Tail to an Old Tail."

== Style ==
The story is told from a 3rd person linear narrative and it is a "collection of prose - poetry narrative performances, and a meditation for the reader's contemplation." Writer Kirsten Holst Petersen considers Changes an "adaption of a particular Akan oral performance form in which the audience is presented with a performed narrative through which to debate a series of moral issues to no real conclusion." Aidoo also "creates a parallel between theme and form... allow[ing] the reader access to…different layers of meaning within the text, [through] the traditional players of the dilemma tale [as well as] a variety of other voices," such as the dialogue between the two village women that opens Part II.

== Literary criticism ==
This work is generally perceived as a modern, feminist novel. "In 'Antagonistic Feminisms and Ama Ata Aidoo's Changes,' Kirsten Holst Petersen describes Aidoo's latest novel as a "provocation" that works between and against the various positions of African and Western feminisms to explore the questions of modern-day African female identity." Waleska Saltori Simpson supports the claim that Changes is a feminist novel, stating that "...through Esi, Aidoo rejects situations and relationships, both in literature and society, that entrap women and define them within restricted spaces that limit the possibilities for a diversity of female identities." Nada Elia suggests that the "articulation of the concept of 'marital rape' is critical to the conscious development of African feminism, as it allows for a woman's realization of her rightful ownership of her body under any and all circumstances." However, although the book portrays polygamy in a negative light, it is not polygamy, but the selfish way in which polygamy is undertaken in the novel that Aidoo criticizes." Pietro Deandrea argues that the novel brings to the fore its own distance from imposed Western models on the marriage issue.
