= Our Sister Killjoy =

1977 novel by Ama Ata Aidoo

- First edition
- Author: Ama Ata Aidoo
- Language: English
- Published: 1977; 49 years ago
- Publisher: Longman
- Media type: Print

Our Sister Killjoy: or Reflections from a Black-eyed Squint is the debut novel of Ghanaian author Ama Ata Aidoo, first published by Longman in 1977. It has been called "a witty, experimental work whose main point is a stylish dismissal of characteristic attitudes of both the white world and the black middle class." It was described by one reviewer as "a strikingly unusual and pertinent commentary on the African encounter with the West, on European soil.... Without being a conventional narrative or biography, it is a text that uses the framework of an account of a state-sponsored visit to Germany by a young Ghanaian woman (the 'Sister' of the title, usually addressed as 'Sissie') to analyse what Europe is and does to those Africans whom it 'sponsors' and educates."

== Summary ==
Our Sister Killjoy is about a young African woman named Sissie who goes to Europe to "better" herself (with European education) as described by her African counterparts. The novel revolves around themes of black diaspora and colonialism, in particular colonization of the mind. Sissie observes the other Africans who have emigrated (also for education and the desire for a better life in Europe) and sees them as "sell-outs" who have forgotten their culture and their motherland. Aidoo touches on the effects of post-colonialism and how the traditions and thoughts of the colonizer are instilled into the minds of the colonized. Sissie in the novel represents the need to have a connection to one's past.

Aidoo is critical of Africans' adulation of Europeans. The first thing Sissie notices upon going into the town in Germany are shiny and glittery material possessions. Aidoo critiques the way some Africans buy into the notion of white superiority, by turning to Europe when they are looking for the "best," whether in education or material possessions. The orientation toward Europe and the investment in whiteness begins in Africa and is reinforced when Africans migrate to Europe. After colonialism, places such as Ghana and Nigeria are left with European institutions and frameworks and they continue to operate within them post-independence. Aidoo positions "Our Sister" as a radical to stand in strong opposition to those black people whose minds do not seem to be filled with thoughts of their own, such as Sammy, the first black person we are introduced to other than Our Sister.

While in Germany, Sissie befriends Marija. Although speaking different languages, they build a strong understanding. As Sissie's time in Germany nears an end, Marija makes a pass at her. Sissie has mixed emotions, never having been attracted to a woman before, and it makes her think deeply about same-sex relationships. The book is notable in the history of queer African literature in that it challenges the popular idea that homosexuality is a Western idea, alien to Africa. Sissie fantasizes about a lesbian relationship, and does not reject the idea of a relationship with Marija.

Later in the novel, Sissie goes to England and is surprised at the number of Africans she sees. She is shocked at their "wretched living conditions"; they live in basement flats and wear ugly, worn-in clothing. Sissie is shocked at the women who, had they been in Africa, would have worn the most beautiful, luxurious clothing, and have now ruined their own beauty. Sissie describes their position in England as "running very fast just to remain where they are".

== Structure ==
The book is split into four different sections and, in its form, the novel switches between two voices: verse and prose. Some portions of the book are structured as poetic verse. These sections sometimes suddenly interrupt the prose sections; in one way, this draws out the plot more slowly, but it also allows the reader to gain a sense of Sissie's inner thoughts and the main themes of the book. The verses tend to have an angry tone, are more retrospective, and generally serve to fill in the gaps and comment on the themes of colonialism and diaspora. The parts to the book that are in prose are used in a more standard way to give basic information about the characters and the plot. Switching unexpectedly between the two voices also creates a sense of tension that reflects the tension Sissie feels during her time in Europe.
