= Rashidah Ismaili =

American poet (born 1941)

- Born: 1941 (age 84–85); Cotonou, Benin
- Other name: Rashidah Ismaili AbuBakr
- Education: New York College of Music; Mannes School of Music; State University of New York
- Occupations: Poet, fiction writer, essayist and playwright

Rashidah Ismaili, also known as Rashidah Ismaili AbuBakr (born 1941), is a poet, fiction writer, essayist and playwright who was born in Cotonou, Benin, West Africa, and in the 1950s migrated to the US, where she still lives in Harlem, New York City. She was part of the Black Arts Movement in New York in the 1960s. She is also an arts and culture critic and taught literature by French- and English-speaking African writers in higher education institutes for more than 30 years.

== Biography ==
=== Early years and education ===
Rashidah Ismaili was born and raised in Cotonou, Benin (formerly known as Dahomey), in West Africa. Her mother was from Benin but her father was from Kano in Northern Nigeria. Ismaili studied at her grandfather's Koran School and at a Catholic missionary school, and after her mother's death was sent to a boarding school in France, remaining there for six years. She was married at the age of 15 to a Nigerian who was studying in New York, where she joined him in 1956/57 after he got a scholarship.

Initially hoping to become an opera singer, she studied at New York College of Music, where she earned a BFA in voice, and she also studied musical theatre at Mannes School of Music, before going on to obtain a master's degree in social psychology at the New School for Social Research, and later a PhD in psychology from the State University of New York (SUNY). After separation from her husband, Ismaili worked at the same time as undertaking graduate studies so as to support herself and her son, as well as writing. She participated in the Black Arts Movement in New York City in the 1960s, and was a member of the Umbra collective of young black writers.

=== Career: creative work and activism ===
She worked as a professor, psychologist, counselor in various universities for over 30 years, before retiring in 2000. She was associate director of the Higher Education Opportunity Program at Pratt Institute for 15 years, and a faculty member of Wilkes University's Creative Writing MA Program, and she now conducts workshops, writing seminars and lectures when not writing. She is the author of collections of poetry, essays, novels, plays and short stories, and her work has been published in many journals and anthologies, including Bomb, The Black Scholar, and The Heinemann Book of African Women’s Poetry (edited by Stella and Frank Chipasula, 1995).

In February 2004, she was a Visiting Scholar/Artist at the University of Ghana, Legon, and conducted seminars on Diaspora Literature with an emphasis on James Baldwin. An executive board member of the Organization of Women Writers of Africa (OWWA), an NGO co-founded in 1991 by Jayne Cortez and Ama Ata Aidoo "for the purpose of establishing links between professional African women writers", Ismaili helped plan and participated in the conference "Yari-Yari Pamberi" held in October 2004 at New York University and the Schomburg Center.

In 2005, an opera based on a collection of her poetry, Elegies for the Fallen, with a score by composer Joyce Solomon-Moorman, was performed at the Borough of Manhattan Community College, and in 2006 a staged reading of Ismaili's play, Rice Keepers, was held at the American Museum.

About her 2014 book, Autobiography of the Lower East Side: A novel in stories, David Henderson said: "This well established poet makes a brilliant debut in fiction with these complex, poetically detailed, interrelated stories of Blacks from Africa, the Caribbean and the USA who converge and form an artistic community in the early 1960s in the most easterly regions of Alphabet City." Reviewing the book in the Huffington Post, Melody Breyer-Grell wrote: "Autobiography of the Lower East Side enveloped this reader to such an extent that every other task was put on hold until its completion. The book, a set of tales; both complete in themselves, but intertwined skillfully, pours forth with an economic lyricism; where metaphors and similes are used sparingly, leaving the story and setting to enter the reader’s consciousness. Richer for that, we are engulfed in the sights, smells, and colors of this neighborhood, finding the beauty through prose, even though the reality might have sometimes been grim."

Ismaili regularly hosts a gathering of national and international artists and scholars at her home in Harlem, known as "Salon d'Afrique. She is First Vice President of Pen & Brush, an international nonprofit organization that "provides a platform to showcase the work of professional emerging and mid-career women and gender expansive artists and writers to a broader audience with the ultimate goal of effecting real change within the marketplace", founded in 1894.

She contributed to the 2019 anthology New Daughters of Africa, edited by Margaret Busby. Ismaili is also a contributor to Encounters with James Baldwin: Celebrating 100 Years (edited by Kadija George Sesay and Cheryl Robson, 2024).

== Awards ==
Ismaili has received recognition and awards including from PEN America, Dramatist League, Kennedy Center, Miami International Book Fair, Zimbabwe International Book Fair, the Puffin Travel Award and the Sojourner Truth Meritorious Award.

== Selected bibliography ==
- Co-editor (with Sandra M. Esteves and Louis R. Rivera), Womanrise, Shamal Books, 1978, ISBN 9780917886058
- Oniybo & Other Poems, Shamal Books, 1986, ISBN 978-0917886096
- Missing in Action and Presumed Dead: Poems, Africa World Press (African Women Writers Series), 1992, ISBN 978-0865432970
- Cantata for Jimmy (poetry), Africa World Press, 2004, ISBN 978-1592211593
- Rice Keepers (a play), Africa World Press, 2007, ISBN 978-1592212446
- Autobiography of the Lower East Side: A Novel in Stories, Northampton House Press, 2014, ISBN 978-1937997397
