= Abeadzi Kyiakor =

Fante village near Saltpond

Abeadzi Kyiakor Abeadze Kyeakor
- Village
- Location of Abeadzi Kyiakor, Ghana in Central Region
- Coordinates: 05°22′24.7″N 01°05′18″W
- Country: Ghana
- Region: Central Region
- District: Mfantseman Municipal
- Time zone: UTC0 (GMT)

Abeadzi Kyiakor is a Fante village near Saltpond, in Mfantseman Municipal district, in the Central Region of Ghana.

== Notable natives ==
- Ama Ata Aidoo
