= Kortney Ryan Ziegler =

American filmmaker

- Born: December 15, 1981 (age 44); Compton, California, U.S.
- Other name: Shane B. Star
- Education: Northwestern University (PhD); San Francisco State University (MA); University of California, Santa Cruz (BA)
- Occupations: Filmmaker; visual artist; writer; blogger; technologist
- Website: kortneyrziegler.net

Kortney Ryan Ziegler (born December 15, 1981) is an American entrepreneur, filmmaker, visual artist, blogger, writer, and scholar based in Oakland, California. His artistic and academic work focuses on queer or trans issues, body image, racialized sexualities, gender, and black queer theory.

== Biography ==
Ziegler was born in Compton, California. Raised in a family of single black women, his mother struggled with mental illness and drug abuse. According to Ziegler's personal essay, his father was absent, and he lived with three alcoholic uncles who inflicted physical and emotional abuse on the women in his family.

He was the first in his family to attend a post-secondary institution. He went on to pursue his master's degree at San Francisco State University and later his PhD at Northwestern University. When he began his doctoral program, he indicated he was female, but during this time, he slowly began his transition. In his third year he began to identify as genderqueer and started taking hormones. In 2011 he began to defend his dissertation on queer, black, and Latino filmmakers. He was the first person to receive a PhD in African-American studies from Northwestern University.

He currently resides in Oakland, California.

== Career ==
=== blac (k) ademic ===
From 2003 to 2006, Ziegler maintained a black queer feminist blog, blac (k) ademic. The blog is on the topic of gender and sexuality from a young black queer academic perspective.

Ziegler's radical stance positioned the experiences of women of color as the locus of his feminist analysis. Ziegler shut down the blog due to the many negative comments he was receiving. blac (k) ademic went on to receive the award for Best Topical Blog in the first annual Black Weblog Awards in 2006. It relaunched in November 2012 and was nominated for a GLAAD Media Award and a Transguy Community Award.

=== STILL BLACK: a Portrait of Black Transmen ===
Premiering in 2008, STILL BLACK: a Portrait of Black Transmen was conceived during the years Ziegler was a doctoral student in the department of African-American studies at Northwestern University. The film explores the theme of female-to-male transgender transition in the African American community. Ziegler and his producer, Awilda Rodríguez Lora, provided the initial financial investment. They employed a grassroots fundraising method, using social networking to secure funds to complete the project.

=== Technology ===
In 2013, Ziegler launched Trans*H4ck, an organizational hub intended for trans people to collaborate on technical projects. It first began as a two-day hackathon.

Along with Tiffany Mikell, he also founded BSMdotCo, an educational technology startup company. They both created Aerial Spaces, a video-based forum.

In 2017, Ziegler and Mikell co-founded Appolition.us to try to help incarcerated Black people return to their families by allowing users to round up purchases to the nearest dollar and donate the funds to funding bail costs. The app was supported through crowdfunding after a tweet from Ziegler in July 2017.

== Honors and awards ==
- 2006 Best Topical Blog, Black Weblog Awards – blac (k) ademic
- 2009 Best Documentary, Reelout Queer Film + Video Festival – STILL BLACK: a portrait of black transmen
- Trans 100 Honoree
- 2013 GLAAD Media Award Nomination for Outstanding Blog
- 2013 Empowerment Award, Black Transmen, Inc.
- 2013 Outstanding Transgender Service, The Esteem Awards
- 2013 Top 40 Under 40 LGBT Activist, The Advocate
- 2013 Authentic Life Award, Transgender Law Center
- 2017 Diablo magazine's 40 Under 40 award winner
