= Gabrielle Civil =

American performance artist

- Born: Detroit, Michigan, US
- Education: University of Michigan; New York University
- Occupations: Performance artist, teacher
- Website: www.gabriellecivilartist.com

Gabrielle Civil is an American performance artist, poet, and educator.

== Background and education ==
Civil is originally from Detroit, Michigan. From 1991 to 1995, she attended the University of Michigan, from where she graduated with high honors in both Creative writing and Comparative Literature. Later, Civil attended New York University for both her master's and her doctorate. She received her M.A. in comparative literature in 2000. Her dissertation, From Body to Nation: Reading Black Women's Poetry in the United States, Haiti & Canada, focused on the poetry of black women in the United States, Canada and Haiti. Civil's concentrations included Black Feminist Theory; African-American Literature; Experimental World Poetry.

== Career ==
Civil started her teaching career teaching summers at Bard College, Annandale-on-Hudson, in New York. She taught "strategies for embodied knowledge" through Language & Thinking 2002, 2004, 2005, 2006. Following her summers at Bard College, Civil taught "Women and Voice: Black Women and Performance" at Macalester College from 2005 to the winter of 2006. She then returned to Bard College, and taught for the Bard College Prison Initiative, "Language & Thinking, Eastern Maximum Security Correctional Facility," the summer of 2011. She taught at St. Catherine University in St. Paul, Minnesota, from 2000 to 2013 as a tenured professor in English, Women's studies, and Critical Studies of Race and Ethnicity. From 2013 to 2016, she was a tenured associate professor of performance at Antioch College in Yellow Springs, Ohio. She currently teaches as guest faculty in the Jack Kerouac School of Disembodied Poetics at Naropa University in Boulder, Colorado.

As a curator, Civil worked on the following performance projects:

- "From the Hive presents Girls in their Bedrooms: installations, video & performance", with Ellen Marie Hinchcliffe, PoppyCock ArtSpace, Minneapolis, MN, May 2014
- "Call & Response", a dynamic of Black Women & Performance at Antioch College, organizer and curator of college and community performance art project featuring myself, Duriel E. Harris, Kenyatta A. C. Hinkle, Rosamond S. King, Wura-Natasha Ogunji, Miré Regulus and Awilda Rodríguez Lora, Antioch College, Yellow Springs, OH, July & August, 2014
- "Grief: an Experiment in Joy", MLK Art Intensive with Gabrielle Civil, Miré Regulus, Syniva Whitney and Nyx Zierhut, Pangea World Theater, Minneapolis, January 2016

== Works ==
Civil identifies as a black, feminist artist whose aim is "to open up space". She works solo and collaboratively and has premiered more than 40 performances in North America and abroad.

In Performance Art: Futurism to the Present, RoseLee Goldberg analyzes performance art and its significance to the developments made in modern art. She acknowledges that no definition can be encompassing of performance art if it were to be specific. "Performance has been considered as a way of bringing to life the many formal and conceptual ideas on which the making of art is based." There is a significance within current society to performance art and the cultural impact it has and how culture impacts the arts. "This latest account describes the huge increase in the number of twenty-first century artists around the globe turning to performance as a medium for articulating 'difference'—of their own cultures and ethnicities—and for entering the larger discourse of international culture in our highly mediated times."

=== Selected works of performance art ===
Civil's works include:

- "Oration (a ritual of ancestors)"
  - Location: Black Intersections: Resistance, Pride & Liberation conference, Claremont University Consortium, Claremont, CA, April 2017
- "Say My Name" (an action for 270 abducted Nigerian Girls)"
  - House of Wahala Auction, Houston, Texas, April 2017, AWP Conference, Washington, D.C., February 2017, Pratt Institute, Brooklyn, NY, February 2017 La Pocha Nostra Intensive, Mérida, Mexico, January 2017, St. Catherine University, St. Paul, MN, December 2016 Culture / Shift, USDAC, St. Louis, MO., November 2016, Naropa University, Boulder, CO, October 2016 Women's Art Institute, St. Paul, MN, June 2015, Brooklyn College, Brooklyn, NY, April 2015 Antioch College, Call & Response, July 2014. Premiered at Girls in their Bedrooms, Minneapolis, MN, May 2014
- "Northern Oracle" (a ritual of nest and flight), activation of "Northern Oracle"
  - Location: Hart, Doris McCarthy Gallery, University of Toronto-Scarborough, Canada, February 2017.
- ". . . hewn & forged . . . (Alchemical Activation against the Shadow Book)"
  - Location: Jack Kerouac School of Disembodied Poetics, Visiting Writer Series, Naropa University, Boulder, CO, October 2016; premiered at Salt Lake City Performance Art Festival, Featured Performer (along with Marilyn Arsem, Anna Kosarewska, Jorge Rojas), Salt Lake City, Utah, September–October 2016
- "_______ is the thing with feathers"
  - Description: Call & Response, a dynamic of black women and performance
  - Location: Antioch College, Yellow Springs, OH, August 2014
- "Fugue (Da, Montreal)"
  - Location: Hemispheric Institute on Politics & Performance Encuentro
- "MANIFEST! Choreographing Social Movements in the Americas"
  - Location: site-specific performance, Montreal, Canada, June 2014
- "Aide-mémoire (bedroom remix)"
  - Location: From the Hive presents Girls in their Bedrooms: installations & performance, PoppyCock ArtSpace, Minneapolis, MN, May 2014
- "and then. . . ." (featuring Nicolas Daily)
  - Location: Currencies performance event, Herndon Gallery, Antioch College, February 2014
- "Aide-mémoire"
  - Discussion: "Incorporating objects, music and movement, Aide-Mémoire playfully explores the creation and exchange of memory. In real time, the artist will erect her own diaspora memory theater, conduct photo-memory experiments, and inaugurate a memory gift economy with the audience. Inspired by classical method of loci, tourist souvenirs, Nuruddin Farah's novel Gifts, selfies and déjà vu, the work becomes a form of new jack memory diplomacy, a "non-paper" manifestation of mnemonics from flesh to camera flash."
  - Location: Herndon Gallery, Antioch College, January 2014, premiered at AFiRiPerFOMA Biennial, Harare, Zimbabwe, November 2013
- "Sucking Teeth" with Rosamond S. King
  - Location: Penn State-University Park, College Park, PA, October 2013
- "How to Get Started" (after John Cage)
  - Location: Antioch College, Student Orientation and reprised by demand at Community Potluck, Yellow Springs, OH, October 2013
- "Fugue (dissolution, Accra)", Yari Yari Ntoaso
  - Location: Accra, Ghana, May 2013
- "Fugue", a meditation on the 2010 Earthquake in Haiti, Pillsbury House Theater, Late Nite Series
  - Location: Minneapolis, MN, November 2012; premiered ArtQuake, Haiti Cultural Exchange, 5 Myles Gallery, Brooklyn NY, December 2011
- "____ doesn't know____ own beauty (or Vanishing Rooms)", performance collaboration with Moe Lionel
  - Description: inspired by the novel by Melvin Dixon
  - Location: Fish House Studio, St. Paul, MN, July 2012
- "* a n e m o n e", Pleasure Rebel
  - Location: Bryant-Lake Bowl Theater, May 2012
- "incur/inflict"
  - Description: Symposium on Violence & Community
  - Location: Naropa University, Boulder, CO, May 2012
- "From the Hive" collaboration with Ellen Marie Hinchcliffe
  - Location: Bedlam TenFest, Minneapolis, MN, May 2011
- "dirt piece", performance Laboratorio, la Perrera Art Center
  - Location: Oaxaca, Mexico, January 2011
- "despedida (MN)"
  - Location: Obsidian Arts Gallery, Pillsbury House, Minneapolis, MN, May 2010
- "<<MN <->MX>>"
  - Location: Low Lives 2, Juried Live Art Show On-Line, Transmitted from Obsidian Arts Gallery, Pillsbury House, Minneapolis, MN, April 2010
- "Instead"
  - Location: Association of Caribbean Women Writers & Scholars Conference, University of Louisiana, Baton Rouge, April 2010
- "BRUSH (MN)"
  - Location: Obsidian Arts Gallery, Pillsbury House, Minneapolis, MN, April 2010
- "Muño (MN)"
  - Location: Obsidian Arts Gallery, Pillsbury House, Minneapolis, MN, April 2010
- "despedida"
  - Location: Galería Interferencial, Mexico City, Mexico, November 2009
- "Tie Air (reconfigurations)"
  - Location: Teatro Casa Cruz de la Luna, San Germán, Puerto Rico, August 2009
- "In & Out of Place (México, DF)"
  - Location: Museo Ex Teresa Arte Actual, Mexico City, Mexico, June 2009
- "Muño (fantasía de la negrita)"
  - Location: Performagia Encuentro Internacional de Performance, Museo del Arte de Tlaxcala, Tlaxcala, Mexico, June 2009
- "Tie Air" (after my experience in La Congelada de Uva's taller de performance )
  - Location: Center for Independent Artists, Minneapolis, MN, March 2009
- "In and Out of Place (MLK & Obama)"
  - Location: Paseo de la Reforma, Mexico City, January 2009
- "BRUSH"
  - Location: Pasagüero, Mexico City, Mexico, December 2008
- "Me Enojo Contigo"
  - Location: Parque Mexico, Mexico City, November 2008
- "Comedy & Other Work"
  - Location: Bedlam Theater, Minneapolis, MN, June 2008
- "The Outsiders," performance collaboration with Ellen Marie Hinchcliffe
  - Bedlam Theater 10-Minute Play Festival, Minneapolis, MN May 2008
- "ghost / gesture"
  - Location: Jakarlo, Senegambia, The Gambia, West Africa, April 2007
- "displays (after Venus)"
  - Location: Mt. Holyoke College, S. Hadley, MA, November 2006
- "heart on a sleeve"
  - Location: FIELD TRIPS, Chicago Field at Links Hall, Chicago, IL, May 2006
- "Spring Tour," "Spring Tour"
  - Description: solo performance
  - Location: "The Promise of Green: Resilience, Resistance and the Coming Season", Center for Independent Artists, Minneapolis, MN, March 2006
- "R S V P: work / play / process"
  - Description: two day performance event with the No. 1. Gold Collaborative
  - Center for Independent Artists, Minneapolis, MN, January 2006 (performer and main curator)
- "How's Work?" performance with Molly van Avery
  - Location: premiered at RSVP, Center for Independent Artists, Minneapolis, MN, January 2006
- "Unblown Breath"
  - Description: Honoring Our Ancestors Show (curated by Ellen Marie Hinchcliffe)
  - Location: Patrick's Cabaret, Minneapolis, MN, November 2004
- "Berlitz," Yari Yari Pamberi: Black Women Dissecting Globalization, Organization of Women Writers of Africa Conference
  - Location: New York, New York, October 2004
- "after Hieroglyphics"
  - Location: Center for Independent Artists, Minneapolis, MN, March 2004
- "Romance" from "after Hieroglyphics"
  - Location: Patrick's Cabaret, February 2004
- "Anacaona", détras de la puerta china
  - Location: University of Puerto Rico, Rio Piedras, PR, July 2003
- "economy"
  - Location: Center for Independent Artists + Art-a-Whirl, Minneapolis, May 2003
- "whisper (the index of suns",
  - Location: Naked Stages series, Intermedia Arts, Minneapolis, MN, October 2002
- "The Secret Garden (Closet)"
  - Location: site specific performance installation @ chez moi, June 2002
- "Hyperbolic" with the No. 1. Gold Collaborative
  - Location: American Living Room Festival, HERE, New York, NY, August 2002
- "Art Training Letter (Love)"
  - Description: a performance rumination on intimacy and catastrophe after September 11
  - Location:from Hieroglyphics, Vulva Riot, Intermedia Arts, June 2002
- "Circulation"
  - Location: @ hYPERcREATION: poetry / technology / performance, St. Catherine University, February 2002
- "infestation of gnats"
  - Location: from Hieroglyphics (a triptych), original solo performance at Red Eye Theatre, Minneapolis, MN, February 2002 (directed by Miré Regulus)
- "Art Training Letter (Love)" (a performance rumination on intimacy and catastrophe after September 11) from Hieroglyphics, "Many Voices: An Evening of Resistance, Ritual & Resilience after 9/11"
  - Location: The Babylon Café/ Cultural Arts & Resistance Center, November 2001
- "Chimerical", with the No. 1. Gold Collaborative
  - Location: Asian American Writers Workshop, NY, NY, August 2001
- "Body Dander, Dust"
  - Location: Casita Torres, Arroyo Seco, NM 1997

== Themes and criticism ==
Civil's writings and performances investigate ephemerality and documentation, race, remembering, community-building, and inclusion. Her work is in constant conversation with artists working both today and in the past: she has stated that she is "haunted by the black women artists, dancers, performers, thinkers, whose body of work has been destroyed and lost to time." Civil frequently incorporates collaborative techniques, such as call-and-response, in her writing and performance: for example, the collaborative piece "Call & Response", convened at Antioch College in 2014 with Duriel E. Harris, Kenyatta A. C. Hinkle, Rosamond S. King, Wura-Natashi Ogunji, Miré Regulus, and Awilda Rodríguez Lora, resulted in numerous art projects and "experiments in joy." In her installation "Kinds of Performing Objects I've Been", Civil also collaborated with audiences for the work, interacting with gallery patrons, telling stories, and performing gift exchanges.

=== Writing ===
- Glints. WinteRed Press. 2006.
- Civil, Gabrielle (January 1, 2017). Swallow the fish: a memoir in performance art. Civil Coping Mechanisms. ISBN 9781937865795. OCLC 973420542.
- Experiments in Joy (2019, #RECURRENT/Civil Coping Mechanisms) ISBN 978-1-948700-15-3

From her artist's notes to performance outlines, she reveals the spaces an artist inhabits prior to presenting a finished piece before an audience. For anyone who has ever thought a performance artist just enters stage right and wings it, this memoir will prove you sorely mistaken. From initial inklings of ideas to concrete performance scripts, Civil's archives demonstrate the sheer time and dedication this art form begs of those who choose to wield it.

— Neyat Yohannes
