= Anowa =

1970 play by Ama Ata Aidoo

- 1980 edition
- Author: Ama Ata Aidoo
- Genre: Tragic Couple
- Publication date: 1970
- Publication place: Ghana

Anowa is a play by Ghanaian writer Ama Ata Aidoo that was published in 1970, after Aidoo returned from Stanford University in California to teach at the University of Cape Coast. Anowa is based on a traditional Ghanaian tale of a daughter who rejects suitors proposed by her parents Osam and Badua, and marries a stranger who ultimately is revealed as the Devil in disguise. The play is set in the 1870s on the Gold Coast, and tells the story of the heroine Anowa's failed marriage to the slave trader Kofi Ako.

The play has a unique trait whereby a couple, an old man and an old woman, take on the role of the Chorus. They present themselves at crucial points in the play and give their own views on the events in the play.

Anowa's attitude of being a modern independent woman angers Kofi Ako. He requests her to be like other "normal" women. Anowa lives in a hallucinated world, and the sorrow of not bearing a child depresses her. Her rich husband, now frustrated with his wife, asks her to leave him. Anowa argues with him and finds out that he had lost his ability to bear children and the fault accounting for being childless was in him and not in her. This disclosure of the truth drives Kofi Ako to shoot himself and Anowa drowns herself.

Anowa represents the modern woman, who wishes to make her own decisions and live life as per her choice. An additional conflict is that, although a tribal woman, she has the traits of a city-bred. Her attitude leads to her destruction.

== Characters ==
Anowa – Anowa is the protagonist of the play. She is the wife of Kofi Ako, as well as the only child of Abena Badua and Osam. Anowa is first described as a young woman who is "slim and slight of build". Anowa is portrayed as a free-spirited woman who values making her own decisions and living the type of life that she wants for herself.

Kofi Ako – Kofi Ako is the husband of Anowa. He comes from the Nsona house, which is seen as one of the best houses in Yebi – according to Osam. Kofi is described as a good-looking, "tall, broad, young man". Kofi is a hard-working businessman who trades animal skin for a living. Kofi becomes one of the richest men in all the Gold Coast.

Abena Badua – Abena Badua is the mother of Anowa and the wife of Osam. Badua and Anowa have a falling out after Badua protests about her marriage to Kofi Ako. Badua wishes her daughter would be more like traditional Yebi women.

Osam – Osam is the father of Anowa and husband of Badua. Unlike Badua, Osam is indifferent about whom Anowa marries and leaves the decision to his daughter. Osam is often seen smoking in the play.

Old Man – The Old Man is one half of the "Mouth-That-Eats-Salt-And-Pepper". The Old Man and the Old Woman create exposition with their dialogue. Both the Old Man and the Old Woman are considered first-person narrators. The Old Man is described as "serene" and "orderly".

Old Woman – The Old Woman is one half of the "Mouth-That-Eats-Salt-And-Pepper". The Old Woman, alongside the Old Man, creates exposition with their dialogue. Both the Old Woman and the Old Man are considered first-person narrators. The Old Woman walks with a stick but is always restless and often seen moving around.

Boy – Boy is a slave to Kofi and Anowa. Boy is only referred to as "boy" in the play. Although Anowa is barren and without children, boy refers to Anowa as "mother" and Kofi as "father".

Girl – Girl is a slave to Kofi and Anowa. Girl is only referred to as "girl" in the play. Like Boy, Girl refers to Anowa as "mother" and Kofi as "father". Girl is fond of Kofi and Anowa and wishes she was their child.

Panyin – Panyin is an eight-year-old slave to Kofi and Anowa. Panyin is the twin sibling of Kakra.

Kakra – Kakra is an eight-year-old slave to Kofi and Anowa. Kakra is the twin brother of Panyin.

== Themes and motifs ==
There are many themes and motifs throughout Ama Ata Aidoo's Anowa; however, the main themes scholars have agreed upon are as follows:

=== Tradition/Cultural practices ===
Scholars have pointed out the importance of traditional/cultural practices in relation to different characters in the play. For instance, Anowa's mother Badua feels strongly regarding her daughter marrying a man that is capable of providing a specific lifestyle for her. She leans on her husband (Osam) for support but is met with a lack of concern as he would rather see his daughter become a priestess, to which Badua completely rejects. Badua continues to hold firm in her traditional beliefs of how her daughters life should play out, (marrying a man she approves of, having a farm and multiple children, etc) thus driving a wedge between the two women when Anowa states she is marrying Kofi Ako, a man Badua had not imagined her daughter ending up with.

While Anowa challenges her mothers wishes of a more traditional partner and ultimately lifestyle she simultaneously pressures her husband Kofi Ako to submit to certain cultural beliefs. When Anowa realizes she is unable to have children she urges Kofi to obtain multiple wives in order to create a culturally accepted family dynamic. When Kofi fights back Anowa has a difficult time accepting his decision and continues to pressure him.

=== Feminism ===
Many scholars have argued the role feminism plays throughout Anowa, however what they can agree on is that it is present in some capacity. Anowa's character for instance represents a rejection of cultural norms in more ways than one. When she chose Kofi Ako as the man she will marry she does not do so for the fact that he will provide a culturally accepted lifestyle for her, rather she steps out of that suppressive notion and marries him solely based on her feelings for him.

When Kofi and Anowa's relationship takes off he is quickly made aware of her dominant, rebelling nature. Anowa rejects the traditional cultural practice of a wife being a homemaker and adjusts to life on the road with her husband quickly. Even when Kofi suggests that life on the road will only get tougher she fights back claiming that she enjoys it. This attitude is something Kofi finds confusing as traditionally women do not desire a life of "hard labour" and therefore questions why she must be so difficult and ultimately rebellious.

=== Slavery ===
Slavery is a dominant theme throughout Anowa, and Adioo suggests a sort of compliance within the community towards the Atlantic slave trade. Anowa's character strongly disagrees with the use of slaves and argues with her husband because of it. In fact, she would rather have him marry multiple women to help with their work than enslave people to do so. In Phase Three of the play we see Anowa reflect on a conversation between her and her grandmother in which she learned about the slaves for the first time. It is a memory that haunts her and has ultimately moulded her feelings towards her husband's desire to own slaves holding firm in her own beliefs.

== Influences and development ==
In Ama Ata Aidoo's Anowa, the central theme of perspective is often seen through a unified lens included with intersectionality. In Yogita Goyal's academic journal article, we are given the acknowledgement in the understanding of perspective as crucial in navigating the themes which wishes to highlight. In summary, Aidoo acknowledges that completeness is obtained within her story through accepting and understanding both sameness and differences between each character within the written text. Furthermore, in Aidoo's play Anowa is the understanding of the divided roles, and understanding how these differences interact with one another.

According to the artists Minna Niemi and Yaba Badoe, Aidoo's play Anowa represents a visionary component in the history of the silencing of African woman's perspective and voice. However, more specifically, Aidoo represents the importance of challenging heteronormative and hegemonic gendered roles by expressing open and honest communication between both the female and male characters throughout her text. Therefore, because Aidoo considered her voice and role as an African female author to be inferior to her male counterparts, it ultimately highlights the issues surrounding gender inequality and misrepresentation in literary terms, as well as social. In this way, as Connie Rapoo would argue, Aidoo's fictionalized work is a symbolic representation of her own real world experiences as being a female African playwright and writer. Aidoo's Anowa represents a visionary approach to tackling and discussing the binary gendered roles with her portrayal of masculinity and femininity.

== Honours, awards and performances ==
Anowa became an iconic play based on Ghanaian folklore. The play was produced in London, England, in 1991 and by Humanities Press (New York, New York) in 1970. At the annual Zimbabwe's International Book fair in 2002, Anowa took recognition as part of the collection called "The Twelve Best Books by African Women," which is a collection of critical essays on eleven works of fiction and one play. The Zimbabwe International Book Fair listed the twelve literary books as "Africa's 100 Best Books of the Twentieth Century" for the very first time.

Anowa also created a social impact of recognition in America when a multicultural cast from the University of California at Santa Barbara performed the play in 2012. The play is known to be a contemporary African play because of the positive social impact of the role of the main character in the play. Anowa can also be found in the paperback entitled Contemporary African Plays (listed on the Bloomsbury Group page), which is a collection of notable plays for the past 25 years in African theatre. It honours the play's significance that highlights African culture and tradition.
