= LA Taco =

News publication based in California, US

L.A. TACO
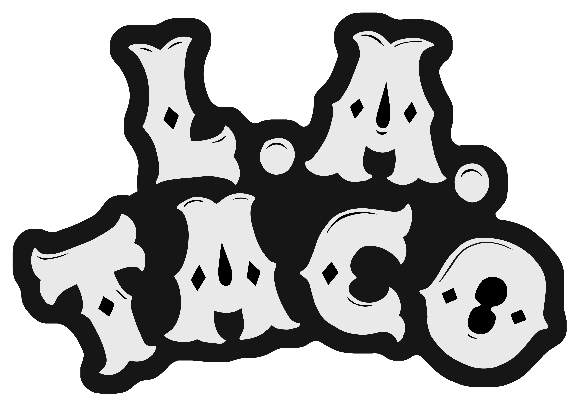
- Website type: Independent news and culture
- Founded: 2006; 20 years ago
- Headquarters: Los Angeles, California, United States
- Area served: Los Angeles
- Editor: Javier Cabral
- Website: lataco.com

L.A. TACO is an independent news and culture publication based in Los Angeles, California. Founded in 2006, it covers food, culture, crime and politics in Los Angeles, with a particular focus on underrepresented communities and street food.

== History ==
L.A. TACO was founded in 2006 as a food and street art blog focused on taco culture in Los Angeles. It gradually adapted its coverage to include broader cultural and political topics.

In 2017, journalist Daniel Hernandez joined as editor-in-chief, further developing the publication's news coverage. Hernandez described the media company's name and vision as “The taco is the unit that binds, it’s the most natural unit that represents who we are as a city and as a culture”

In 2020, L.A. TACO received a James Beard Foundation Award in the Emerging Voice category for its contributions to food journalism.

In 2024, L.A. TACO announced its financial trouble and appealed to readers to raise funds.

In 2025, L.A. TACO received widespread attention and acclaim for its coverage of ICE raids and immigration issues in Los Angeles., with a special focus on how its food coverage evolved during this period, with The New Yorker noting "When the raids began, L.A. Taco was uniquely poised to cover what quickly became a story of international interest, as an outlet respected by the communities that were being targeted."

== Content and coverage ==
The publication has been praised for its in-depth reporting on issues affecting working-class and immigrant communities in Los Angeles.

L.A. TACO is known for its Taco Madness festival, an annual event the Los Angeles Times describes that "competition is fierce and underscores the impact that L.A. Taco has on the community."

The publication co-produced a podcast, The Sellout, which centered on the Los Angeles Latino community and its relationship with City Councilman Jose Huizar.

In July 2025, the publication was profiled by The Washington Post for its evolution from a food site into a trusted source of on-the-ground reporting about immigration enforcement and community resistance in Los Angeles.

Also in 2025, L.A. TACO was featured on CBC Radio's As It Happens for its on-the-ground coverage of ICE raids in Los Angeles.

In January 2026, public radio program This American Life featured L.A. TACO journalist Memo Torres in an episode about immigration enforcement activity in the United States, including a segment on Torres's reporting and documentation efforts through L.A. TACO's video newsletter The Daily Memo.

In May 2026, editorial cartoonist Ivan Ehlers became a Pulitzer Prize finalist in Illustrated Reporting and Commentary for work published in L.A. TACO and other publications.

Also in May 2026, L.A. TACO received the Latino Spirit Award for Journalism & Media from the California Latino Legislative Caucus.

In 2026, L.A. TACO received the Philip Burton Immigration & Civil Rights Award for Advocacy from the Immigration Law Resource Center.

== Print Publications ==
In 2026, L.A. TACO expanded its publishing efforts into print, producing zines that featured the outlet's reporting and artwork. One of the publications, released in September 2026, focused on local protests and immigrant communities and was creatively directed by L.A. TACO cartoonist Ivan Ehlers. The Guardian described the zine's launch as part of a broader series of in-person events organized by L.A. TACO to engage with its readership.

== Awards and recognition ==
L.A. TACO has received several awards for its journalism, including:

- Southern California Journalism Award for Best News Website (2019)
- James Beard Foundation Journalism Award for Local Impact (2020)
- Anthem Award (2021)
- Press Forward Journalism Grantee
- UC Berkeley California Local News Fellowship program.
- Latino Spirit Award for Journalism & Media from the California Latino Legislative Caucus (2026)
- Philip Burton Immigration & Civil Rights Award for Advocacy from the Immigration Law Resource Center (2026)
