= Aminata Diaw =

Senegalese lecturer and political philosopher

Aminata Diaw Cissé
- Born: Aminata Diaw; 24 May 1959; Saint-Louis, Senegal
- Died: 14 April 2017 (aged 57); Dakar, Senegal
- Spouse: Mame Thierno Cissé (m. 1992)

Education
- Education: Lyceé Amet Fall
- Alma mater: University of Nice Sophia Antipolis

Philosophical work
- Institutions: Cheikh Anta Diop University
- Language: French
- Main interests: Political philosophy

Aminata Diaw Cissé (24 May 1959 – 14 April 2017) was a Senegalese lecturer and political philosopher who taught at the Cheikh Anta Diop University (UCAD). Influenced by Jean-Jacques Rousseau and her academia background, she wrote about citizenship, civil society, democracy, development, ethnicity, gender, globalisation, human rights, identity, nationality and the state in an African and Senegalese context by using a political insight. Diaw worked for the Council for the Development of Social Science Research in Africa (CODESRIA), Bellagio Study and Conference Center of the Rockfeller Foundation, National UNESCO Sub-Commission on Social Sciences and Humanities, West African Research Association, the National UNESCO Sub-Commission on Social Sciences and Humanities and the Philosophical and Epistemological Research Center of the Doctoral School Studies.

== Biography ==
Diaw was born on 24 May 1959 in Saint-Louis, Senegal, the former capital of the country, and attended the local Lyceé Amet Fall school. She passed her baccalaureate with the highest honours of Mention Bien aged 19 in 1977 and left Senegal to study in France. Diaw enrolled at the Lycée Paul Cézanne preparatory school in Aix-en-Provence and earned a diplôme d'études universitaires générales in philosophy. The following year, she went to the Lycée Masséna in Nice to complete a Bachelor of Arts degree in philosophy and a DEUG 2, before earning a master's degree from the University of Nice Sophia Antipolis in 1981. Diaw finished her studying with a postgraduate diploma and dissertation on the theory of conflicts of the political thinking of Jean-Jacques Rousseau, which earned her the Très Bien distinction from the jury by a unanimous decision. She completed a doctorate degree with first-class honours from the same institution in 1985.

After graduation, Diaw returned to Senegal and joined the Cheikh Anta Diop University's (UCAD) Department of Philosophy, Faculty of Arts and Humanities. She taught at the university as an assistant lecturer in political philosophy between 1986 and 1989. She was one of the first Senegalese women to teach philosophy at the university. In 1988, Diaw authored Rousseau et la Révolution française: â propos de la théorie de I'État and L'autorité du Souverain ou le pari de la liberté chez Jean-Jacques Rousseau and Du refus du modéle á l'invocation d'autorité: Rousseau et Montaigne two years later. In 1990, Diaw was made a lecturer and lectured for one year at the private Higher Management Institute school in Dakar. Two years later, she was appointed one of the first laureates of the first edition of the Council for the Development of Social Science Research in Africa (CODESRIA) on Democratic Governance, a Pan-African academic research organisation, publishing the monograph Démocratie et logiques identitaires en Afrique on behalf of the institute,

In 1994, Diaw wrote L'invention de la politique en Afrique and Repenser la société civile in 1998. She was made director of the UCAD's director of Information, Cultural and Sports Activities in 1996, was selected as fellow at the Bellagio Study and Conference Center of the Rockfeller Foundation in Italy in 2001, was chair of the National UNESCO Sub-Commission on Social Sciences and Humanities, and vice-chair of the West African Research Association in 2002 and was chair of the Commission on Encounters and Exchanges of the Dakar Biennale in 2004, 2006 and 2008, making her responsible for exchanges and meetings of the commission. Diaw co-authored La recherche French-speaking feminist: Language, identities and challenges with Fatou Sow in 1999, wrote Les intellectuels entre mémoire nationaliste et représentations de la modernité in 2002, Nouveaux contours de l'espace public de Afrique in 2004, and Women Writing Africa, West Africa and the Sahel with Esi Sutherland-Addy, funded by the Ford Foundation in 2005, and was invited by the University of Kansas' African studies program to the Senegalese Women Between Positive Law and Islam: About the Family Code conference in 2003.

She took part in the National Conference of Senegal from 2007 to 2009, defending with the politician Penda Mbow on retaining secularism in the constitution. and wrote Women Writing Africa in November 2005, which was published by Feminist Press in New York. She led the Philosophical and Epistemological Research Center of the Doctoral School Studies (CEREPHE) from July 2009 on. Diaw supported women's rights through being secretary general of the National UNESCO Sub-Commission on Social Sciences and Humanities (COSEF), and was a member of the Senegalese Women Association of University Graduates and African Women Workers Network. Her work with COSEF saw her discuss the democratisation and women's position within this movement and the debate on gender parity with the Senegalese Lawyers' Association. From June 2010, Diaw worked as a senior programme officer of CODESRIA's Training, Grant and Fellowship Division, and worked on its collaboration with UNESCO, UN Women and the UNESCO National Commissions on a project about the women's movement and gender-related violence in The Gambia, Guinea-Bissau and Senegal from 2011 to 2012.

She was resource manager in CODESRIA conferences, methodology, writing workshops, was active in several general assemblies, such as being the co-chair of the programme committee of its 14th general assembly in Dakar in 2015. Diaw led its Gender Research Programme, organised multiple Annual Gender Symposiums in Cairo and its yearly Gender Institute. She was also director of cultural and scientific animation at the UCAD's rectorate, and wrote articles from discussion learnt from African Feminist Forum, African Gender Institute, DAWN on Globalization, Friedrich Ebert Foundation Institute for Democratic Alternatives in South Africa, Rendez-vous de l'histoire de Blois and Women Living Under Muslim Laws.

== Personal life ==
Diaw was a pan-Africanist. In 1992, she married the UCAD professor Mame Thierno Cissé, with whom she had two daughters. Diaw died from illness at the Hospital Center University De Fann in the night of 14 April 2017.

== Analysis and legacy ==
According to Dior Konaté, who wrote Diaw's entry in the Dictionary of African Biography, Rousseau's political thoughts and her background in academia influenced her to employ their theoretical insights to comment on Senegalese current affairs such as citizenship, civil society, democracy, development, ethnicity, gender, globalisation, human rights, identity, nationality and the state in an African and Senegalese context. She observed the connections between gender, politics and power in Africa from both a feminist and philosophical viewpoint.

A ceremony to honour her life took place at the West African Research Center on 20 December 2017. On 3 May 2018, a second tribute for Diaw was hosted by three faculty members at a conference room in UCAD organised by its rectorate, the Faculty of Letters and Human Sciences, its Department of Philosophy, the Directorate of Cultural and Scientific Animation and the UCAD Foundation.
