= Sexuality in Africa =

Attitudes towards sexuality diverges between Sub-Saharan Africa and North Africa, with the former more influenced by Christianity and the latter more influenced by Islam. Discussion of sexuality in Africa often revolves around sexually transmitted diseases. Although there exist African communities that are accepting female pleasure, others may repudiate against such an attitude, while others view sexual acts as primarily a path towards reproduction. Differences in genetic diversity show that in ancient African history, women were more likely to copulate and sire offspring than men, possibly due to female hypergamy.

== Sexuality in the African perspective ==
Sexuality in the African perspective is a multidimensional concept encompassing biological, spiritual, cultural, and social dimensions of human existence. It is deeply embedded in African cosmologies, communal values, and indigenous knowledge systems. Unlike Western individualistic interpretations, African understandings of sexuality are often relational, linking the self to family, community, ancestors, and the divine. From an Afrocentric and feminist perspective, sexuality is not just about physical acts or identities but also about power, agency, and the ways bodies are regulated through culture, religion, and colonial legacies. It includes expressions of desire, gender roles, reproductive health, and the moral codes that shape sexual behavior.

In pre-colonial African societies, sexuality was often fluid and integrated into rites of passage, fertility rituals, and communal responsibilities. However, colonialism and religious fundamentalism introduced restrictive sexual norms that criminalized non-hetero normative expressions and policed human sexual agency. Thus, sexuality in the African perspective is best understood as a dynamic and evolving discourse shaped by tradition, modernity, resistance, and liberation struggles. It is a site of both oppression and empowerment, where African women, LGBTQIA+ individuals, and progressive scholars reclaim agency in defining their sexual identities and ethics.

== Homosexuality ==
The prevalence of homosexuality as a contentious topic in African stereotype of a homophobic continent over the decades. Some believe that in certain African nations, sexual orientation is a reason for political persecution and acts of personal violence in many instances. The majority of traditional African homosexual marriages were based on patriarchal gendered norms, in which the spouses assume complementary positions in society – that is, masculine and feminine. Debates about research on and representations of same-sex sexualities within lesbian and gay studies also reflect the institutionalized racism, sexism, and homophobia of professional organizations. Furthermore, it is important to understand that "cross-cultural lesbian and gay studies has been accused more than once of cultural imperialism." Same sex marriage was a key area for legalisation for those who were lesbian or gay, because by governments legalising same-sex marriage, it allowed homosexuals to gain a sense of equality. However, for President Mugabe, who was leader of Zimbabwe, he believed homosexuality was "un-African" and that it broke the traditional lifestyle for those within the West of the continent.

When South Africa included protection for sexual orientation as a human right in its Constitution in 1996, it became the first nation in history to do so. Throughout the colonial and apartheid period there was a censorship with sexuality because they worked to create and place white male heterosexuality as the most dominant group in the socially constructed hierarchy within a highly racialized and gendered setting. This was a time in South Africa when society was still sharply racially divided, which impacted those relationships. There was a demand for a safe space for queer people within society, meanwhile there was an obsession of examining the relationships between those who were 'the black' and 'the white'.

Female homosexuality was an extreme struggle for those within Africa, and it was a political fight for sexual freedom and expression within many states. In nations like Cameroon, it had become essential to emphasise one's be-longing or grounding by stigmatizing homosexuality. Many struggled with fitting in within their societies due to their homosexuality. Meanwhile, for homosexual women that were seen or viewed to be more masculine than feminine also were viewed as a risk. Male sexual supremacy was the foundation of post-colonial power. Hence, homosexual women in relationships with others claim to be persuaded more masculine than feminine within their relationships with other women, was viewed to openly demonstrate signs and symbols of masculine power and identity.

=== Religious aspects ===
The African continent is highly religious and has the fastest growing number of people who follow Christianity and Islam out of any anywhere in the world. Across the African continent at least 86% of Africans identify as either Muslim or Christian. The Pew Research show that the number of Africans identifying as Christians grew from around 10 million in 1910 to 500 million in 2010, and it is indicated that this number will grow to around 633 million by 2025. Pew Research also identified that the number of people who practiced Islam grew from 11 million in 1990 to 429 million in 2010. They also state that by 2030 this number will increase to around 639 million Africans.

Despite both religions' differences, they both significantly disapprove of the LGBTQI+ community with the idea of the 'traditional family' being a prominent feature within both doctrines. More traditional African societies define marriage as a legalized union of a man and woman which constitutes a family. Additionally, procreation is stated to be a religious obligation with both husband and wife being biologically reborn into the world and will therefore constantly be a part of the world (even after death). As a result, many Christians and Muslims do not approve of homosexuality due to their traditional religious values.

However, in pre-colonial Southern Africa same-sex Africans were often seen to have positive spiritual powers. For example, some groups saw lesbians as healers, and astrologers, as well as having medicinal powers. European colonisers had a dramatic impact on the positive social attitudes towards homosexuality among indigenous African populations. These colonisers began to educate Africans on the Christian religion, including their traditional societal values, which ultimately disagreed with homosexuality. This traditional rejection of homosexuality continued and was taught from generation to generation within many African nations. In 1991, the former president of Kenya, Daniel Arap Moi, suggested that it was against "African tradition and biblical teaching" for a man and another man or a woman and another woman to be intimate with one another. In addition, the President of Uganda, Yoweri Museveni, gained applause after signing the Anti-Homosexuality Act which suggests how disapproving many people are toward homosexuality.

=== Homosexuality in Uganda ===
Across the African continent, there are various legislation and cultural beliefs regarding whether homosexuality is acceptable or not. With many countries in other parts of the world transitioning to a legislative and cultural acceptance of LGBTQ+ sexualities, the African continent has the legacies of homophobia that former European colonies had implemented. Gay sex is illegal in thirty-eight African countries. One of which is Uganda. With such stigmas and laws remaining since British colonial rule, LGBTQ+ rights in Uganda is very much still a battle queer Ugandan people face.

Religion is an essential factor when considering how LGBTQ+ is treated in Uganda. A history of missionaries and a heavy influence of Evangelicalism has spread the Christian image of "traditional family values." This leads to same-sex activity or relationships outside of the desired Christian image, resulting in the LGBTQ+ being outsiders in their own country. Therefore, because of the heavy influence of Christianity brought over by the West, the presence of religion in Uganda has negative impacts on the LGBTQ+ community. During colonial rule, not only was Britain spreading Christian ideals, but it was also destroying ways of life. Missionaries worked along with British colonial powers to implement Western ideals.

Religion has made its way into influencing legislation regarding LGBTQ rights. Uganda is one of few countries in Africa where homosexuality, in some cases, is punishable by death. The 2023 Anti-Homosexuality Act is responsible for this. The Act also permits life-long imprisonment and the halt of conducting business with gay people. When the bill was introduced in 2009, it was done so by Mr. Bahati on behalf of the Conservative Christian Uganda Parliamentary Fellowship. This Christian-desired bill has, therefore, made the lives of LGBTQ+ difficult as not only can they express themselves, but they also cannot be active in society.

Despite the influence of British Colonial Rule on homosexuality in Uganda, there is another set of arguments that Africa is an entirely heterosexual continent, and outsiders brought in any ideas of same-sex activity. Janet Museveni was an influential figure who projected this view nationwide. She used it to blame homosexuality for being present in Uganda. In addition to banning same-sex acts, missionaries, along with British Colonial powers, prohibited traditional forms of Ugandan dancing. Paulo Neil Kavuma, when in power, decided to ban Western dancing. Museveni and Kavuma, among other politicians, is an example of how Uganda's poor treatment of homosexuals also comes from within. Uganda's culture, history, and government have, therefore, made the lives of homosexual people in the country challenging, with no ability to express their sexuality without risk of punishment.
