= Ruby Yayra Goka =

Ghanaian dentist and author

- Born: 15 May 1982 (age 44); Accra, Ghana
- Occupations: Dentist, author
- Writing career
- Genre: Fiction

Ruby Yayra Goka (born 15 May 1982, Accra) is a Ghanaian dentist and author. She is best known for being a multiple Burt Award for African Literature winner in Ghana.

Goka, who is an alumnus of the University of Ghana Dental School, currently heads the Dental Department of the Ho Teaching Hospital.

== Early life ==
Born in Accra, Ghana, Goka was born to Simon Yao Goka, a retired diplomat, and Lydia Aku Goka, a stay-at-home-mother. When Ruby was two years old, her family moved to Ethiopia, where she attended the Peter Pan International School. When she was six, her family moved back to Ghana, and she continued her basic and secondary education at the St. Anthony's School (1988–96) and Achimota School (1996–99), both in Accra.

== Career ==
Goka worked for two years at the Ridge Hospital Accra after obtaining a BDS from the University of Ghana Dental School in 2009. She later moved to Sogakofe, where she worked for two years at the South Tongu District Hospital. She is a fellow of the Ghana College of Physicians and Surgeons, having completing her residency training at the Komfo Anokye Teaching Hospital, Kumasi in 2016 and her fellowship training at the University of Ghana Dental School, Accra in 2023. She currently heads the Dental Department of the Ho Teaching Hospital, Ho.

In 2010 and 2011, two of her works, The Mystery of the Haunted House and The Lost Royal Treasure, won third and second place respectively for the Burt Award for African Literature.

In 2017, Goka won an award in the Authorship and Creative Writing Category in the 40 under 40 awards in Ghana. She was also awarded a Medical Excellence Award in Dentistry in the same year.

Goka is a 2017 Mandela Washington fellow.

== Bibliography ==
Adult books

- Disfigured (2011)
- In The Middle of Nowhere (2011)

Young adult books:

- The Mystery of the Haunted House (2010)
- The Lost Royal Treasure (2011)
- When the Shackles Fall (2012)
- Those Who Wait (2012)
- Perfectly Imperfect (2013)
- Plain Yellow (2014)
- The Step-Monster (2015)
- To Kiss a Girl (2018)
- Whatever It Takes (2019)
- Blast To the Past (2020)
- Girl On Fire (2020)
- Even When Your Voice Shakes (2022)
- The Broken Wall (2024)
- On the Inside (2024)

Children's books

- A Gift for Fafa
- Tani's Wish (2016)
- Mama's Amazing Cover Cloth (2018)
- My ABC Book of Special Words (2021)
- Sela Gets a Haircut (2024)
- Xornam Xonexoe (2024)
- Grandma and the Goat Thief (2024)

Anthologies

- Mother, anthology of writing on mothers (contribution: "The ABCs of Motherhood")

== Awards ==
- Monteiro Lobato FNLIJ Award 2023 (Mesmo Quando sua voz Falar)
- Rise: A feminist Book Project for Ages 0-18 Honour Book 2023 (Even When Your Voice Shakes)
- Efua Sutherland Children's Book Prize 2022/Ghana Association of Writers' Children's Story Prize (Even When Your Voice Shakes)
- Brittle Paper's 100 Notable African Books of 2022 (Even When Your Voice Shakes)
- Books for Keeps Ten of the Best: Books from the Commonwealth 2022 (Even When Your Voice Shakes)
- Kirkus Review 2022 (Even When Your Voice Shakes)
- School Library Journal Review 2022 (Even When Your Voice Shakes)
- Efua Sutherland Children's Book Prize 2021/Ghana Association of Writers' Children's Story Prize (Trotro Trio: A Blast to the Past)
- Women in Sports Collection 2020 (Girl on Fire)
- IBBY Honour Book 2020 (Mama's Amazing Cover Cloth)
- Efua Sutherland Children's Book Prize 2020/Ghana Association of Writers' Children's Story Prize (Mama's Amazing Cover Cloth)
- CABA Honour Book 2019 (Mama's Amazing Cover Cloth)
- Ayi Kwei Armah Award 2019/Ghana Association of Writers Novel Prize (To Kiss a Girl) (2019)
- Inspire Us Book Collection 2019: Honour Book (Whatever it Takes) (2019)
- The Professor Kofi Awoonor Literary Prize 2018: Second runner-up (In the Middle of Nowhere)
- Efua Sutherland Book Prize 2018/Ghana Association of Writers' Children's Story Prize (A Gift for Fafa)
- Ayi Kwei Armah Award 2018/Ghana Association of Writers' Novel Prize Runner-up (In the Middle of Nowhere)
- Burt Award for African Literature 2018 (To Kiss a Girl)
- CODE Burt Award for Ghanaian Young Adult Literature 2018 (The Broken Wall)
- CODE Burt Award for Young Adult Literature: All Star Edition 2017 (The Step-Monster)
- Medical Excellence Award—Dentist category (2017)
- 40 Under 40 award: Authorship and creative writing (2017)
- Burt Award for African Young Adult Literature (2017) (finalist)
- Ghana Writers’ Awards—Short Story Category (2017) (finalist)
- Burt Award for African Young Adults (2017) (Honour Prize)
- Burt Award for African Literature (2015) (First Prize)
- Burt Award for African Literature (2014) (Second Prize)
- Burt Award for African Literature (2013) (First Prize)
- Burt Award for African Literature (2012) (Second Prize)
- Burt Award for African Literature (2012) (Honourable Mention)
- Burt Award for African Literature (2011) (Second Prize)
- Burt Award for African Literature (2010) (Third Prize)
