= Esi Sutherland-Addy =

Ghanaian academician, educationalist, writer and human rights activist

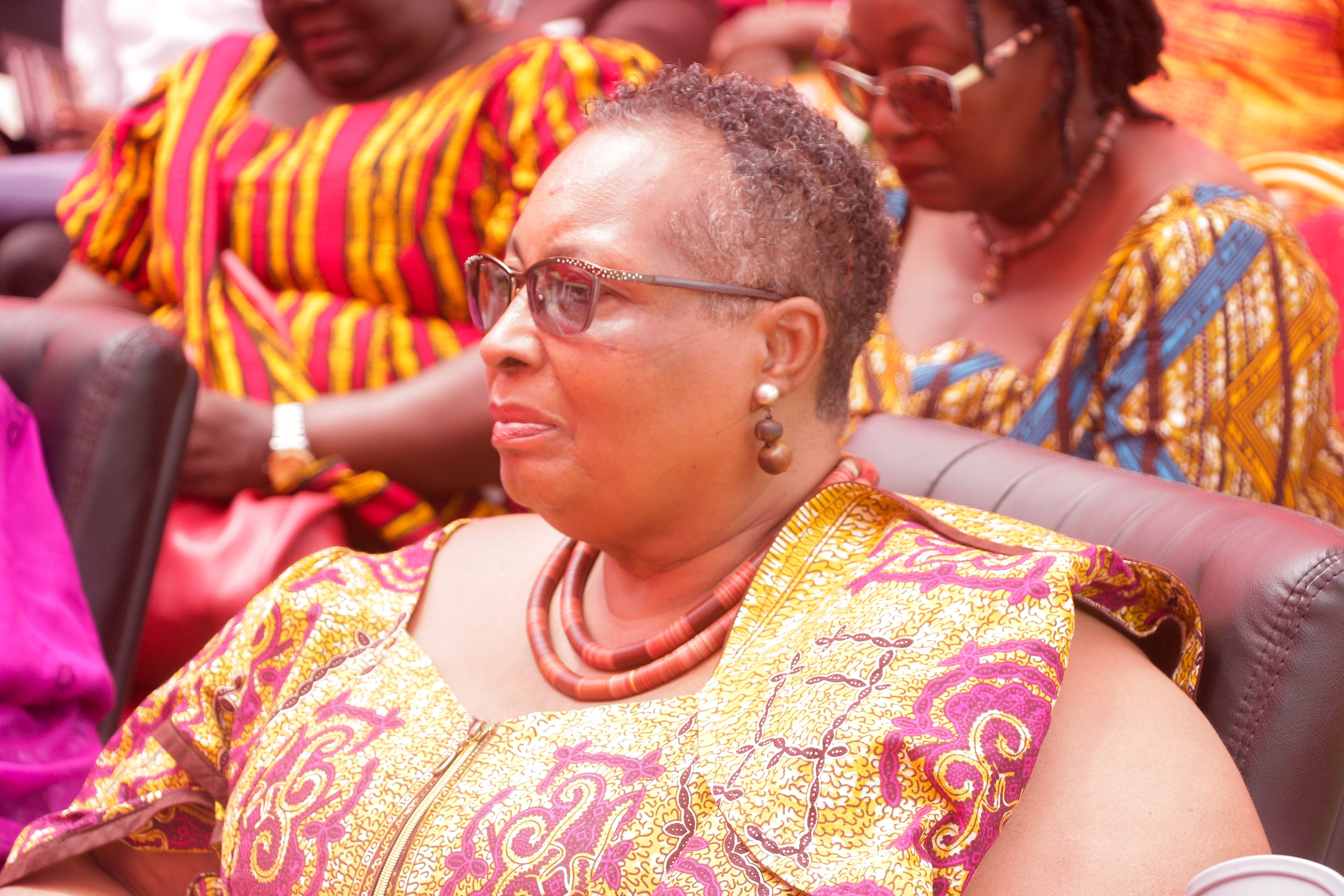
- Born: Esi Reiter Sutherland; Ghana
- Education: Achimota School
- Occupations: Academic, writer, educationalist, and human rights activist
- Organization(s): Institute of African Studies, University of Ghana
- Parent(s): Efua Sutherland and Bill Sutherland

Esi Sutherland-Addy is a Ghanaian academic, writer, educationalist, and human rights activist. She is a professor at the Institute of African Studies, where she has been senior research fellow, head of the Language, Literature, and Drama Section, and associate director of the African Humanities Institute Program at the University of Ghana.

She is credited with more than 60 publications in the areas of education policy, higher education, female education, literature, theatre and culture, and serves on numerous committees, boards and commissions locally and internationally. She is the first daughter of writer and cultural activist Efua Sutherland.

== Biography ==
Born in Ghana as Esi Reiter Sutherland, she is the eldest of the three children of playwright and cultural activist Efua Sutherland and African-American Bill Sutherland (died 2010), a colonial civil rights activist who went to Ghana in 1953 on the recommendation of George Padmore to Kwame Nkrumah. She was educated at St. Monica's Secondary School, Mampong and Achimota School (where she met her husband).

She has held various positions at educational establishments in Europe and the US, which includes being a Senior Fellow at the Institute of International Education at Manchester University, UK, and as visiting lecturer at the following universities: University of Indiana, Bloomington, USA, the Centre for African Studies, New York University Accra Campus, University of Birmingham, UK, and L'Institut des Hautes Etudes en Sciences Sociales, Paris, France.

She served with the Ghana government as Deputy Minister for Higher Education, Culture and Tourism from 1986 to 1993, and as Minister of Education and Culture from 1994 to 1995. She has undertaken studies particularly in the field of education for many international organizations, including UNESCO, UNICEF, the World Bank and the Association for the Development of Education in Africa. She has been on both local and global boards with companies such as the Ghana Commercial Bank, the Open Society Initiative for West Africa, and the Commonwealth of Learning.

She has also held key roles in non-governmental organizations and has been on the executive board of the Forum for African Women Educationalists (FAWE) and the Mmofra Foundation. She has served as the chairperson of such entities as: the board of trustees of the United Nations Voluntary Fund for Technical Cooperation (VFTC). and Afram Publications Ghana Ltd.

Sutherland-Addy works with the Institute of African Studies at the University of Ghana and spearheads a project called Oral Traditions and Expressive Diversity, involving the collection and digitization of Ghanaian Oral Traditions. She also supervises postgraduate students.

== Awards ==
Sutherland-Addy has been the recipient of several awards, including:

- Honorary Fellowship of the College of Preceptors, UK (1998)
- Group Award by the Rockefeller Foundation (2001 and 2002) for the Women Writing Africa Project
- Honorary Doctorate of Letters from the University of Education, Winneba (2004)
- Excellence in Distance Education Award from the Commonwealth of Learning (2008)
- Ghana Tourism Authority 20th Anniversary Emancipation Day Award (2018)

== Selected bibliography ==
Editor

- (Editor) Perspectives on Mythology (Proceedings of a Conference organized by the Goethe-Institut and the Institute of African Studies, University of Ghana, between 21 and 24 October 1997), Goethe-Institut/Woeli Publ. Services, 1999. ISBN 9789964978549
- (Co-editor with Aminata Diaw) Women Writing Africa: West Africa and the Sahel, The Feminist Press at CUNY, 2005. ISBN 978-1558615007.
- (Co-editor with Anne V. Adams) The Legacy of Efua Sutherland: Pan-African Cultural Activism, Banbury: Ayebia Clarke Publishing, 2007. ISBN 978-0-9547023-1-1.
- (With Ama Ata Aidoo) Ghana: Where the Bead Speaks, Foundation for Contemporary Art-Ghana, 2008. ISBN 9789988153601.
- (Co-editor with Takyiwaa Manuh) Africa in Contemporary Perspective: A Textbook for Undergraduate Students. Ghana: Sub-Saharan Publishers, 2013. ISBN 9789988647377.

Papers

- "Gender Equity in Junior and Senior Secondary Education in Sub-Saharan Africa", World Bank Publications, The World Bank, number 6500, November 2008.
- "Women, Intangible Heritage and Development: Perspectives from the African Region", ICH UNESCO.
