= Natalia Molebatsi =

South African writer

- Born: Tembisa, near Johannesburg, South Africa
- Occupations: Writer, poet, performer and editor
- Organizations: University of South Africa
- Website: www.nataliamolebatsi.com

Natalia Molebatsi is a South African writer, poet, performer, editor, and cultural organizer.

== Biography ==
Natalia Molebatsi was born and raised in the township of Tembisa, near Johannesburg in South Africa.

She is a Pan-African feminist scholar-poet. She is the author of two poetry collections, Sardo Dance and Elephant Woman Song, and the editor of We Are: A Poetry Anthology and Wild Imperfections: An Anthology of Womanist Poems. Molebatsi is the co-founder of Black Girls Brilliance, which states: "We center Black Girls narratives to co-create programs that provide them with the support needed to flourish."

Her poetry is included in Lived Resistance against the War on Palestinian Children (edited by Heidi Morrison); Letter to South Africa: Poets Calling the State to Order; Happiness the Delight-Tree: An Anthology of Contemporary International Poetry; New Coin, and New Daughters of Africa, edited by Margaret Busby. Her academic writing is included in books and journals such as the National Political Science Review, Muziki, Agenda Feminist Media and Sasinda Futhi Siselapha: Black Feminist Approaches to Cultural Studies In South Africa's Twenty-Five Years Since 1994.

Molebatsi has performed poetry, facilitated creative writing workshops and presented public speaking seminars in 21 countries including Nigeria, Senegal, Kenya, Zimbabwe, Ethiopia, England, Italy, Azerbaijan, Argentina, China, Palestine and Germany. Among notable events she has featured are the Yari Yari Ntoaso women's conference in Ghana, Poetry Africa, Aké Arts and Book Festival in Abeokuta, Lagos International Poetry Festival and the Buenos Aires International Book Fair.

Molebatsi is a teacher and PhD candidate in Performance Studies at Northwestern University She has worked at the University of South Africa for more than 15 years in different capacities, including marketing and lecturing. Her scholarship is at the intersections of poetry and performance studies, Pan-African feminist theory, gender and sexuality studies, queer and lesbian theories, Black studies and media studies.
