= Cheryll Greene =

American editor and scholar (1943–2013)

Cheryll Y. Greene
- Born: December 20, 1943
- Died: December 19, 2013 (aged 69)
- Occupations: Editor; scholar
- Known for: Executive editor of Essence magazine

Cheryll Y. Greene (December 20, 1943 – December 19, 2013) was an American editor and scholar. Her work focused on history, culture, and social justice issues. She served as executive editor of Essence magazine and was involved in major projects about the life and times of Malcolm X.

Between 1979 and 1985, Greene used Essence, a fashion magazine for African-American women, as a platform for publication of work about the African diaspora. While at the Institute for Research in African-American Studies (IRAAS) at Columbia University between 2001 and 2004, she was managing editor of the Malcolm X Project, as well as managing editor of Souls, an African-American studies journal. At IRAAS, she collaborated with Manning Marable in developing and conducting oral history interviews with associates of Malcolm X. Greene was a curatorial and research consultant for the 2005 exhibition Malcolm X: A Search for Truth at The New York Public Library's Schomburg Center for Research in Black Culture.

== Selected publications ==
- Tight Little Island: Chicago's West Woodlawn Neighborhood, 1900-1950, in the Words of Its Inhabitants. Robert L. Polk, Executive Editor. Cheryll Y. Greene, Editorial Designer and Editor. CNG Editions, 2008.
- "Writing the World" by Cheryll Y. Greene. Essence magazine: Volume 28, Issue 12 (April 1998).
- Malcolm X: Make It Plain. Text by William Strickland with the Malcolm X Documentary Production Team. Oral histories selected and edited by Cheryll Y. Greene. Viking, 1994.
- Voices From the Battlefront: Achieving Cultural Equity. Edited by Marta Moreno Vega and Cheryll Y. Greene. Africa World Press, 1993.
- "Women Talk: A Conversation with June Jordan and Angela Davis" by Cheryll Y. Greene. Essence magazine: Volume 21, Issue 1 (May 1990).
- "Word from a Sister in Exile" by Cheryll Y. Greene. Essence magazine: Volume 18, Issue 10 (February 1988).
- "Angela Davis: Talking Tough" by Cheryll Y. Greene. Essence magazine: Volume 17, Issue 4 (August 1986).
