= Yolanda Arroyo Pizarro =

Puerto Rican writer (born 1970)

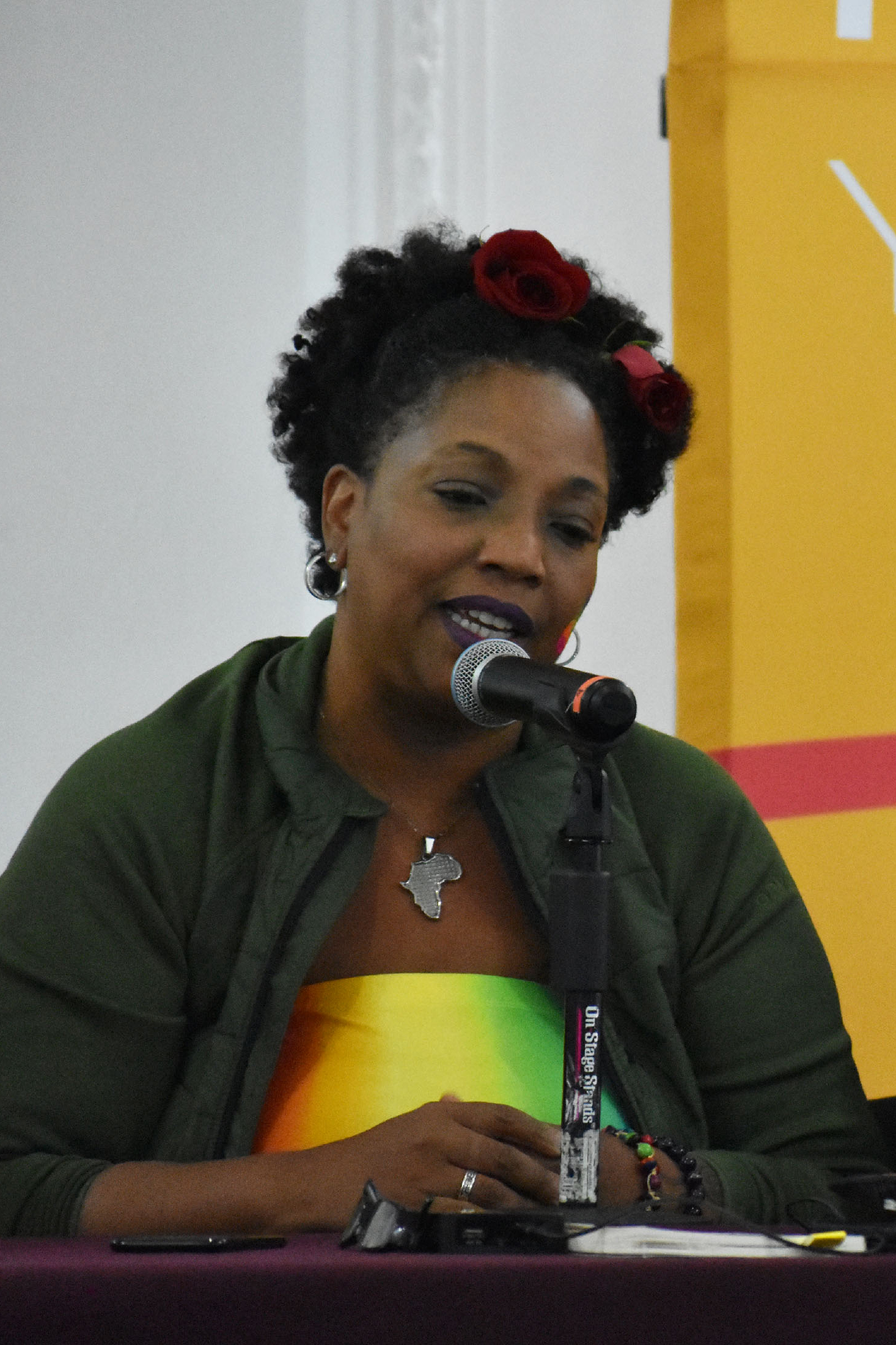
- Arroyo Pizarro in 2019
- Born: Yolanda Arroyo Pizarro; 29 October 1970 (age 55); Guaynabo, Puerto Rico
- Occupations: Novelist, short-story writer and essayist
- Awards: Premio Nacional del Instituto de Literatura Puerto-rriqueña (2008); Premio del Instituto de Cultura de Puerto Rico (2012)

Yolanda Arroyo Pizarro (born 29 October 1970) is a Puerto Rican novelist, short-story writer and essayist.

== Biography ==
Yolanda Arroyo Pizarro was born on 29 October 1970 in Guaynabo, Puerto Rico, and was raised by her grandparents, Petronila Cartagena and Saturnino Pizarro. She began writing at an early age in school newsletters and newspapers and won drawing and essay competitions at the Colegio San Vicente Ferrer in Cataño. In 1989, she won the intra-university competition of the Bayamón Central University with the story "Vimbi Botella." In 1990, she directed a play entitled ¿A dónde va el amor? (Where Does Love Go?) based on her own script, which was staged in Barrio Amelia, a poor neighborhood in Guaynabo where the author was raised.

In 2004, Arroyo published her first book of short stories Origami de letras (Letter Origami). The following year, she published her first novel Los documentados (The Documented), which deals with migration conditions in the Caribbean, specifically from Hispaniola to Puerto Rico. This novel won the PEN Club Prize for 2006. In 2007, she published a new book of short stories, Ojos de Luna (Moon Eyes), in which she explores the ways in which eviction, solidarity, and spiritual barriers marginalize people. The book was selected by El Nuevo Día as one of the best in 2007 and was a finalist in the Puerto Rican Literature National Award. That same year, she was chosen as one of the most important Latin American writers under 39 years of age as part of Bogotá39, convened by UNESCO, the Hay Festival, and the Ministry of Culture in Bogotá. She was the only representative from Puerto Rico.

In 2011, Salón Literario Libroamérica de Puerto Rico selected Arroyo Pizarro's new book, Caparazones, as the best new novel and the same year she was awarded a writer-in-residency grant by the National Hispanic Cultural Center in Albuquerque, New Mexico. The Latina Writers Convention recognized her short story "Los cojones de una mujer sin pecho" at their 2012 convention. Arroyo Pizarro's body of work consists of two novels, three collections of poetry, nine short-story books, and contributions to more than two dozen anthologies, among them New Daughters of Africa, edited by Margaret Busby (2019). Arroyo has broadcast as a radio host of Kooltureate for Bonita Radio and is the Chief Editor of the literary journal Revista Boreales. In addition to her own publications, she regularly contributes to newspapers such as Claridad, La Expresión, El Nuevo Día, and El Vocero. She has served as a member of the jury for the Sor Juana Inés de la Cruz Prize for several years.

Arroyo Pizarro frequently writes about LGBT issues in her work and has participated with other writers and activists in the LGBTTIQ and African-descent communities in conferences and symposia held in Colombia, Ecuador, Mexico, Spain, and Venezuela. In 2014, she and her partner, Zulma Oliveras Vega, joined the same-sex marriage case Conde-Vidal v. Rius-Armendariz. When the United States Court of Appeals for the First Circuit ruled that the island's marriage ban was unconstitutional, Arroyo Pizarro and Oliveras Vega became the first same-sex couple to marry in Puerto Rico.

== Publications ==
Arroyo Pizarro has been published in Spain, Mexico, Argentina, Panama, Guatemala, Chile, Bolivia, Colombia, Venezuela, Denmark, Hungary, and France. Her work has been translated into English, Italian, French, and Hungarian.

=== Books ===
- 2003 Origami de letras, 2003, Publicaciones Puertorriqueñas, Puerto Rico.
- 2005 Los documentados, 2005, Editorial Situm, Puerto Rico.
- 2007 Ojos de luna, 2007, Terranova Editores, Puerto Rico.
- 2009 Historias para morderte los labios
- 2010 Cachaperismos: poesía y narrativa lesboerótica (lesbian erotic short stories and poems selection from lesbian authors)
- 2010 Caparazones (novel)
- 2010 Medialengua: moitié langue, petits poèmes et des histoires
- 2013 Violeta (novel)
- 2016 Las negras
- 2017 TRANScaribeñx, Editorial EGALES, Barcelona-Madrid (short stories)
- 2018 Pelo Bueno, EDP University Press (children's book)

=== Short stories ===
- "Las ballenas grises" (Primer Premio Certamen Pepe Fuera de Borda de Argentina 2006)
- "El coleccionista de latidos" (Primer Premio Certamen Pepe Fuera de Borda de Argentina 2005)
- "Orión", from Origami de letras
- "Virginia", from Origami de letras
- "Manos Dibujando", Revista Antropofagia, Argentina 2008
- "Fahrenheit" (story in Derivas.net)
- "Rapiña" (story in Letralia.com)
- "Andanas" (story in Sinister Wisdom's 97th Publication; Summer 2015)

=== Poems ===
- Selected poems, Antología Mujer Rota

== Awards ==
- Premio Nacional del Instituto de Literatura Puerto-rriqueña (2008)
- Premio del Instituto de Cultura de Puerto Rico (2012)
- Ojos de Luna was selected as book of the year in 2007 by the magazine El Nuevo Día

== See also ==
- List of Puerto Rican writers
- Bogotá39
