= Paula Giddings =

American writer and historian (born 1947)

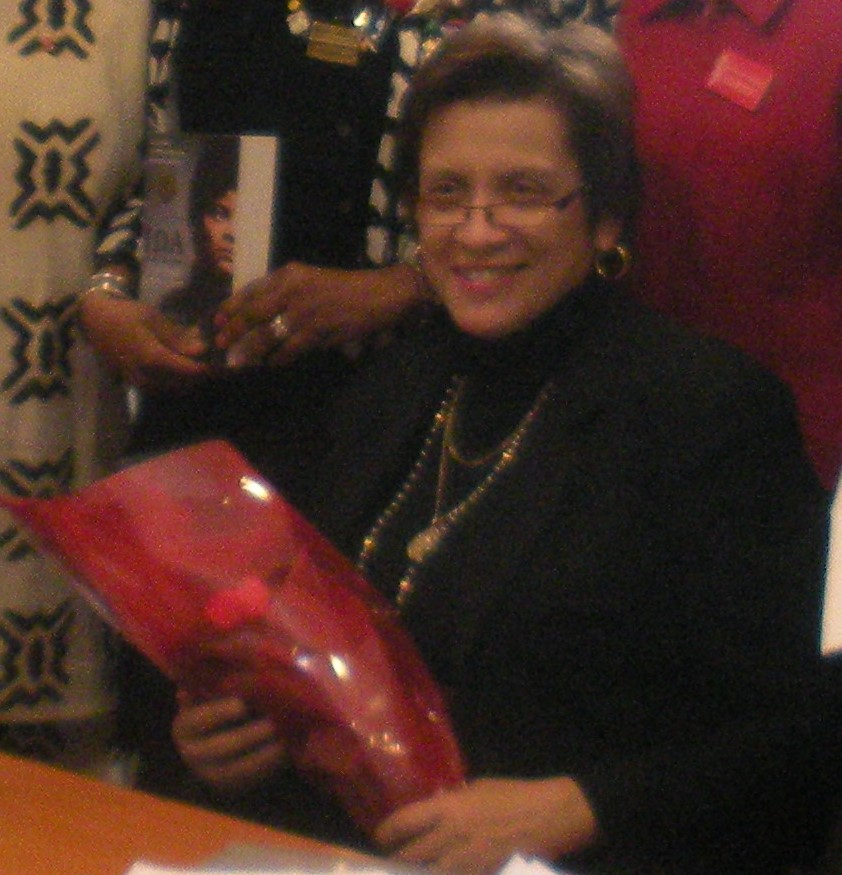
- Giddings in 2011
- Born: 1947 (age 78–79); Yonkers, New York, U.S.
- Education: Howard University
- Occupations: Writer, historian, and civil rights activist
- Known for: When and Where I Enter: The Impact of Black Women on Race and Sex in America (1984); Ida, A Sword Among Lions: Ida B. Wells and the Campaign Against Lynching (2008)

Paula Jane Giddings (born 1947) is an American writer, historian, and civil rights activist. She is the author of When and Where I Enter: The Impact of Black Women on Race and Sex in America (1984), In Search of Sisterhood: Delta Sigma Theta and the Challenge of the Black Sorority Movement (1988) and Ida, A Sword Among Lions: Ida B. Wells and the Campaign Against Lynching (2008).

== Early life ==
Paula Jane Giddings was born on November 16, 1947, in Yonkers, New York, to Virginia Iola Stokes and Curtis Gulliver Giddings. She grew up in a predominantly white neighborhood in Yonkers, where she regularly and systematically experienced isolation and racism from her white neighbors. As a teen, Giddings personally experienced and witnessed the racism and violence against African Americans that led to and occurred in reaction to the Civil Rights Movement. This led her to participate in the movement as a Freedom Rider. According to Giddings, this set the stage for her desire to understand both oppression and resistance to it, a theme that would recur through her own activism and writing.

== Education ==
In 1965, Giddings graduated from Gorton High School in Yonkers. That year she enrolled in the historically Black college Howard University, where she worked on the university's newspaper beginning in her first year. In 1967, she became editor of the university's literary magazine,The Promethean, and graduated with a Bachelor of Arts degree in English in 1969. As a student at Howard, Giddings was part of a group of students who worked against sexism, colorism, and classism that they saw as rampant on their campus. She was inspired by her professors, including Arthur P. Davis and Jeane Marie Miller.

== Career ==
From 1969 to 1972, Giddings worked for Random House, first as an editorial assistant and later as a copy editor. She worked with Charles Harris, who was pushing for more Black editors to join the company, and at this time the publisher was producing many works by Black authors, including Angela Davis and the Black Panthers. In 1972, Harris started Howard University Press, and Giddings joined as well, becoming an associate book editor. Three years later, she felt disillusioned by the falling momentum of the civil rights movement, and wanted to fulfill her dream of living abroad. In 1975, she moved to Paris, France, to serve as the Paris bureau chief for Encore America/Worldwide News. She opened the Paris branch of the newspaper, reporting on local issues as well as traveling throughout Africa, interviewing people like Winnie Mandela and President Idi Amin. In a notable 1975 trip, she traveled to South Africa, where she had the opportunity to meet leaders of the Anti-Apartheid Movement. Two years later, she transferred to the New York office, where she served as an associate editor until 1979.

In 1984, Giddings published her first book, When and Where I Enter: The Impact of Black Women on Race and Sex in America, which tracks the history of Black women in the United States through the 1970s and the confluence of the Civil Rights and Women's Rights movements. Kirkus Reviews described the book as "the first historical study of the relationship, in America, between racism and sexism--broad-ranging, occasionally plodding, generally sound and insightful." The following year, Giddings served as contributing editor and book review editor for Essence magazine and became a distinguished scholar for the United Negro College Fund (UNCF).

In 1988, Giddings joined the faculty of Douglass College at Rutgers University. That same year, she published In Search of Sisterhood: Delta Sigma Theta and the Challenge of the Black Sorority Movement, a history of Delta Sigma Theta, the African-American sorority of which she is a member. The book was recognized for its depth and its focus on the influence of Delta Sigma Theta and its members. She also became a fellow of the Barnard Center for Research on Women.

In 2001, Giddings joined Smith College as the Elizabeth A. Woodson 1922 Professor of Africana Studies. She also served as the editor of feminist journal Meridians: Feminism, Race, Transnationalism. She then became Smith College department chair and honors thesis advisor for the department of Africana studies, where she remained until her retirement in 2017.

Giddings received many accolades upon the 2008 publication of her biography of civil rights activist Ida B. Wells. Ida, A Sword Among Lions: Ida B. Wells and the Campaign Against Lynching received the 2008 Letitia Woods Brown Book Prize from the Association of Black Women Historians, the Gustavus Myers Center for the Study of Bigotry and Human Rights Outstanding Book Award, and was the 2009 Nonfiction winner of the Black Caucus of the American Library Association Literary Award. It won the 2008 Los Angeles Times Book Prize for Biography. In addition, it was a finalist for the National Book Critics Circle Award for 2008 and was named a Best Book of 2008 by both the Washington Post and the Chicago Tribune. The book was recognized as the inaugural Duke University John Hope Franklin Research Center Book Award winner in 2011.

In 2017, Giddings was a National Book Award Judge for nonfiction works. That same year, she was inducted into the American Academy of Arts and Sciences.

== Selected publications ==
- Ida, A Sword Among Lions: Ida B. Wells and the Campaign Against Lynching (Amistad/HarperCollins, 2008, ISBN 0060797363)
- Burning All Illusions: Writings from The Nation on Race 1866-2002 (Editor) (Thunder's Mouth Press, 2002, ISBN 1560253843)
- In Search of Sisterhood: Delta Sigma Theta and the Challenge of the Black Sorority Movement (William Morrow & Co, 1988; Quill Publishers, 1995, ISBN 0688135099)
- When and Where I Enter: The Impact of Black Women on Race and Sex in America (William Morrow & Co, 1984; Bantam Press, 1985; 2nd edn: William Morrow Paperbacks, 1996, ISBN 0688146503)

== Selected honors and awards ==
- The following is a brief listing of some of the recognition Paula Giddings has received for her work and its impact.
  - Candace Award for History, National Coalition of 100 Black Women, 1984
  - John Simon Guggenheim Memorial Foundation Fellow, 1993
  - Letitia Woods Brown Book Prize from the Association of Black Women Historians for Ida, 2008
  - Gustavus Myers Center for the Study of Bigotry and Human Rights Outstanding Book Award for Ida, 2008
  - Los Angeles Times Book Award for Biography for Ida, 2008
  - National Book Critics Circle Award finalist for Ida, 2008
  - Ida named a Best Book of 2008, The Washington Post
  - Ida named a Best Book of 2008, The Chicago Tribune.
  - Nonfiction winner of the Black Caucus of the American Library Association Literary Award, 2009
  - Inaugural John Hope Franklin Research Center Book Award, 2011
  - American Academy of Arts and Sciences, 2017
  - Howard University Distinguished Alumni Achievement Award In The Field of Journalism, 2018
  - Phi Beta Kappa Visiting Scholar
  - Guggenheim Foundation Fellowship
  - fellowship by the National Humanities Center
  - fellowship by the Center for Advanced Study in the Behavioral Sciences at Stanford University
  - Honorary Doctorates from Bennett College and Wesleyan University
