= Alexis De Veaux =

American writer and illustrator (born 1948)

- Born: September 24, 1948 (age 77); Harlem, New York, U.S.
- Education: Empire State College (BA, 1976); University at Buffalo (MA, PhD)
- Occupations: Writer; Illustrator

Alexis De Veaux (sometimes as Alexis DeVeaux) (born 1948) is an American writer and illustrator. She chaired the Department of Women's Studies, at the State University of New York at Buffalo.

== Biography ==
De Veaux was born in Harlem on September 24, 1948, to Richard Hill and Mae De Veaux. She earned a Bachelor of Arts from State University of New York's Empire State College (1976), and a Master of Arts and Doctor of Philosophy from the University of Buffalo.

From 1979 to 1991, De Veaux wrote for Essence magazine.

De Veaux is a lesbian.

== Awards ==
- 1972: Short story "Remember Him, an Outlaw" received National Black Fiction Award.
- 1972: First prize from Black Creation for a short story.
- 1973 best production award from Westchester Community College Drama Festival for Circles.
- 1974: NA-NI received Brooklyn Museum of Art Books for Children Award.
- 1981: Don't Explain: A Song of Billie Holiday appeared on the American Library Association's Best Books for Young Adults list.
- 1981: National Endowment for the Arts fellow
- 1982: Unity in Media Award
- 1984: MADRE Humanitarian Award
- 1984: Fannie Lou Hamer Award
- 1988: An Enchanted Hair Tale received American Library Association Coretta Scott King Award.
- 1991: An Enchanted Hair Tale received Lorraine Hansberry Award for Excellence in Children's Literature.
- 2005: Warrior Poet: A Biography of Audre Lorde received the Hurston/Wright Legacy Award for nonfiction
- 2005: Warrior Poet: A Biography of Audre Lorde was a Stonewall Honor Book in Non-Fiction
- 2015: Yabo received the 27th Annual Lambda Literary Award for Lesbian General Fiction.

== Publications ==
- Na-Ni. Harper & Row. 1973.
- Spirits in the Street. Anchor Press. 1974.
- Gap Tooth Girlfriends: An Anthology. Gap Tooth Girlfriends Publications. 1981.
- Blue Heat: A Portfolio of Poems & Drawings. Diva Pub. Associates. 1985.
- Don't Explain: A Song of Billie Holiday. Writers & Readers Publishing, Incorporated. 1988. ISBN 978-0-393-01954-4.
- This Far by Faith: A Writer's Autobiography. State University of New York at Buffalo. 1989.
- Yabo. RedBone Press. 2014.
- JesusDevil: The Parables. AK Press. 2023.
