= Rosamond S. King =

American poet and literary theorist

Rosamond S. King is an American poet and literary theorist. She is a literature professor at Brooklyn College, where her courses focus on Caribbean and African literature, sexuality, and performance. In 2017, she won the Lambda Literary Award for Lesbian Poetry for her debut poetry collection, Rock | Salt | Stone.

== Early life and education ==
King was born in the United States to a mother from Trinidad and a father from the Gambia. Her family moved frequently throughout her childhood.

She attended Cornell University, graduating with a bachelor's degree in literature in 1996. Next, she matriculated at New York University, where she graduated with a master's and subsequently a Ph.D. in comparative literature in 2001. She then traveled to the Gambia, where she studied Gambian literature on a Fulbright scholarship.

== Academic career ==
King has worked as an associate professor of English at Brooklyn College since 2008. She teaches classes on Caribbean and African literature, creative writing, and sexuality in the African diaspora. She has published scholarship in a variety of journals. In 2018, King was appointed as director of the Ethyle R. Wolfe Institute for the Humanities at Brooklyn College.

A Brooklyn resident, she has contributed to several projects on LGBT rights and history in New York.

== Writing ==
King began publishing poetry in 1994, but it was many years before she was able to publish a full-length collection.

In 2004, she was the lead editor for the collection Voices of the City: Newark Reads Poetry, and in 2009 she published a poetry chapbook, At My Belly and My Back. She also co-edited Theorizing Homophobias in the Caribbean: Complexities of Place, Desire, and Belonging, a digital multimedia project launched in 2012. She joined the Executive Board of the Organization of Women Writers of Africa in 2011 and became president in 2018. She also serves as creative director of the Small Axe Project's tri-annual digital platform sx salon.

In 2014, King published her first book of literary criticism, Island Bodies: Transgressive Sexualities in the Caribbean Imagination. It deals with the "history of sexualities, violence, language, and repression in the Caribbean culture." In 2015, Island Bodies won the Caribbean Studies Association Gordon K. and Sybil Lewis Prize for the best Caribbean Studies book.

Her debut full-length poetry collection, Rock | Salt | Stone, was published in 2017, more than two decades after she began writing poetry. The following year, the collection won the Lambda Literary Award for Lesbian Poetry. King is a contributor to the 2019 anthology New Daughters of Africa, edited by Margaret Busby. Her second collection, All the Rage, was published by Nightboat Books in April 2021 and received a Lambda Literary Award nomination the following year.

King also produces performance art, some of which centers on her poetry, in the United States and abroad.

Her work is shaped by her experiences as a lesbian and member of queer communities across the African diaspora. It is influenced by both African and Caribbean cultural images. She says that her work seeks to "illuminate the lives and experiences of people 'other' than white people and men, the traditional subjects of mainstream poetry and art."

== Selected works ==
- Voices of the City, an Urban Poetry Anthology (2004, editor)
- At My Belly and My Back (2009)
- Island Bodies: Transgressive Sexualities in the Caribbean Imagination (2014)
- Rock | Salt | Stone (2017)
- All the Rage (2021)
