= Osonye Tess Onwueme =

Nigerian playwright (born 1955)

- Born: Osonye Tess Onwueme
- Occupation: Playwright, Scholar
- Language: English
- Citizenship: Nigerian
- Genre: Drama
- Notable works: Tell It to Women; The Reign of Wazobia; The Missing Face

Osonye Tess Onwueme, also known as T. Akaeke Onwueme (born 8 September 1955) is a Nigerian playwright, scholar and poet, who rose to prominence writing plays with themes of social justice, culture, and the environment. In 2010, she became the university Professor of Global Letters, following her exceptional service as Distinguished Professor of Cultural Diversity and English at the University of Wisconsin–Eau Claire. Through her plays, she is able to use the theatre as a medium to showcase historically silenced views such as African women, and shedding more light on African life. She sustains her advocacy for the global poor and youth, along with the experiences and concerns of the African Diaspora in her creative work. In 2007, the U.S. State Department appointed her to the Public Diplomacy Speaker Program for North, East, and West India. The 2009 Tess International Conference: Staging Women, Youth, Globalization, and Eco-Literature, which was exclusively devoted to the author's work, was successfully held by international scholars in the Nigerian capital, Abuja, following the Fonlon-Nichols award to the dramatist. She is regarded as one of the band of more important African authors. She also is an active speaker regarding domestic violence.

== Early life and education ==
After secondary education, she married an agronomist, I. C. Onwueme, and bore five children, during the time she attended the University of Ife, for her bachelor's degree in education (1979) and master's in literature (1982). She obtained her PhD at the University of Benin, studying African Drama. In 1998 she married Obika Gray, a Jamaican political scientist.

== Works ==
- A Hen Too Soon (1983)
- Broken Calabash (1984)
- The Desert Encroaches (1985)
- The Reign of Wazobia (1988)
- Ban Empty Barn and other plays (1986)
- Legacies (1989)
- Three Plays: an anthology of plays by Tess Onwueme (1993)
- Tell It To Women: an epic drama (1995).
- Riot In Heaven: drama for the voices of color (1996; 2006)
- The Missing Face, a play (1997; 2000)
- Shakara: Dance-Hall Queen: a play (2000; 2006)
- Then She Said It: a play (2003)
- What Mama Said, an epic drama (2004)
- No Vacancy (2005)

== Awards ==
She has won several international awards, including: the prestigious Fonlon-Nichols award (2009), the Phyllis Wheatley/Nwapa award for outstanding black writers (2008), the Martin Luther King, Jr./Caeser Chavez Distinguished Writers Award (1989/90), the Distinguished Authors Award (1988), and the Association of Nigerian Authors Drama Prize, which she has won several times with plays such as The Desert Encroaches (1985), Tell It To Women (1995), Shakara: Dance-Hall Queen (2001), Then She Said it (2003), among numerous honors and international productions of her drama.
