= Sam Tulya-Muhika =

Ugandan economist, playwright and diplomat

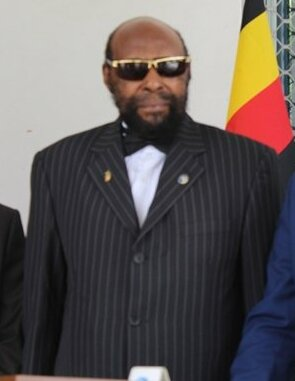
Muhika in 2016

Sam Tulya-Muhika is a Ugandan economist, playwright and diplomat. In 2012 he became the Ugandan Ambassador Extraordinary and Plenipotentiary to Somalia.

== Works ==
- 'Born to Die'. In David Cook & Miles Lee, eds., Short East African Plays, Heinemann, 1968.
- The report of the Public Service Salaries Review Commission, 1980-1982, 1982
- Wulida li-'l-maut, 1984
- Teaching Statistics for Future Government Statistical Services in Africa, 1990.
- A summary of the lessons from the rise and fall of the East African Community, 1995
- (with R. Chande and Francis A. S. T. Matambalya) Deepening East African Community (EAC) integration, 2007
