= List of Kenyan writers =

This is a list of Kenyan writers, includes writers of various genres, who are notable and are either born in Kenya, of Kenyan descent or who produce works that are primarily about Kenya.

== A ==
- Abdilatif Abdalla (1946–)
- Carolyne Adalla
- Jared Angira (1947–), poet^{[Killam & Rowe]}
- Jonah Anguka
- Khadambi Asalache (1935–2006), poet and author^{[Jahn]}^{[Killam & Rowe]}

== B ==
- Carey Baraka (1996-), writer and journalist
- Ben Kiymani (2012-present),writer,filmmaker,

== C ==
- Rocha Chimera, Swahili author and critic
- Jane Tapsubei Creider (1940s–), writer of memoir, fiction, and non-fiction

== D ==
- Eastlandah David (Wesonga) (1985–)
- Hazel de Silva Mugot (1947–), novelist
- Ghalib Shiraz Dhalla
- G.V. Desani (1909–2000), writer

== G ==
- Mugo Gatheru (1925–2011), autobiographical writer^{[Jahn]}
- Muga Gicaru (c. 1920–), novelist^{[Jahn]}, real name as John Mwengi
- John Rugoiyo Gichuki
- Njeri Simon Gichimu (Kiswahili and children's story writer, Jomo and the Wild Cats)
- Moraa Gitaa, author, novelist, short story writer, 2010 Penguin Prize for African Writing nominee, 2008

== H ==
- Elspeth Huxley (1907–1997)

== I ==
- Francis Imbuga (1947–2012), director and playwright^{[Killam & Rowe]}

== K ==
- Ken Walibora (1965-2020)
- Samuel Kahiga, short story writer and novelist^{[Killam & Rowe]}
- Daniel Kamau
- Kingwa Kamencu, poet, script writer
- Joseph Elijah Kariuki (1931–1975), poet^{[Jahn]}
- Josiah Mwangi Kariuki (1929–1975)
- Amin Kassam (1948–2024), Kenyan journalist and poet^{[Jahn]}
- Jomo Kenyatta (1893–1978), Kenyan politician and writer^{[Gikandi & Mwangi]} ^{[Jahn]}
- Justus Kiprono (2001-), Kenyan journalist and finance writer
- Leonard Kibera (1942–1983), novelist and short story writer^{[Gikandi & Mwangi]} ^{[Killam & Rowe]}
- Wanjiru Kihoro (1953–2006), journalist, writer, academic, activist; produced Kenya News in the 1980s from London
- Maina wa Kinyatti
- John Kiriamiti (1950–), writer of popular fiction^{[Gikandi & Mwangi]}
- Wanjiru Koinange, writer, restorer of libraries and entrepreneur
- Kinyanjui Kombani (1981–), writer of popular fiction
- Henry Ole kulet (1950–), ^{[Zakayo & Manexe]}

== L ==
- Muthoni Likimani (1926–)^{[Killam & Rowe]}
- Jeff Lumiri (2015–), author, poet, and novelist^{[Killam & Rowe]}

== M ==
- Marjorie Oludhe Macgoye (1928–2015), novelist, essayist and poet
- David Gian Maillu (1939–), author and publisher
- Charles Mangua (c.1940–2021), fiction writer^{[Killam & Rowe]}
- Anne Matindi (1942–), children's writer
- Ali A. Mazrui (1933–2014), academic and political writer^{[Jahn]} ^{[Killam & Rowe]}
- John Samuel Mbiti (1931–2019), poet and writer on religion^{[Jahn]}
- Miguna Miguna, lawyer
- Ngugi wa Mirii (1951–2008)
- Parmenas Githendu Mockerie (1900?–?), writer
- Mwana Kupona binti Msham (died c.1865), Swahili poet
- Micere Mugo (1942–2023), playwright, academic and poet^{[Killam & Rowe]}
- Mũkoma wa Ngũgĩ (1971–), poet, author and academic
- Ben Mutua Jonathan Muriithi (1968–), a.k.a. BMJ Muriithi, US-based Kenyan journalist, works for VOA (US) and NTV (Kenya)
- Joseph Muthee (1928–), Kikuyu writer
- Wahome Mutahi (1954–2003)
- Meja Mwangi (1948–2025), novelist^{[Killam & Rowe]}
- Gitura Mwaura, development writer and journalist

== N ==
- Rebecca Nandwa, Swahili children's writer
- Alexander Nderitu (1979–), novelist, scriptwriter and Kenyan e-book and Print on Demand pioneer
- Mona L. Nduilu (1976–)
- Michael Ndurumo (1952–)
- Mũkoma wa Ngũgĩ (1971–), poet, author and academic
- Stephen N. Ngubiah (1936–), novelist^{[Killam & Rowe]}
- Ngugi wa Mirii (1951–2008), playwright
- Ngũgĩ wa Thiong'o (1938–2025), English-language and Gikuyu writer^{[Jahn]} ^{[Killam & Rowe]}
- Rebeka Njau (1932–), novelist, playwright and poet^{[Gikandi & Mwangi]} ^{[Jahn]} ^{[Killam & Rowe]}
- Chacha Nyaigotti-Chacha (1952–), playwright

== O ==
- Asenath Bole Odaga (1937–2014), publisher and author
- Atieno Odhiambo (1945–2009), academic
- Oginga Odinga (1912–1994), writer, philosopher and politician^{[Gikandi & Mwangi]} ^{[Jahn]}
- Margaret Ogola (1958–2011)^{[Gikandi & Mwangi]}
- Bethwell Allan Ogot (1929–2025)
- Grace Ogot (1930–2015), short story writer and politician^{[Gikandi & Mwangi]} ^{[Jahn]} ^{[Killam & Rowe]}
- Makena Onjerika, winner of the Caine Prize 2018
- Troy Onyango (1993–), writer
- Dominic Owuor Otiang'a (1987–), author, novelist
- Yvonne Adhiambo Owuor (1968–), winner of the Caine Prize 2003

== P ==
- Shailja Patel, poet, playwright and activist

== R ==
- Mwangi Ruheni (1934–), scientist and popular novelist^{[Gikandi & Mwangi]} ^{[Killam & Rowe]}

== T ==
- Ngũgĩ wa Thiong'o (born 1938 - 2025) - novelist, playwright, essayist

== V ==
- M. G. Vassanji (1950–), novelist and editor
- Iman Verjee
- Vincent de Paul (1986–), novelist, editor, publisher, and creative writing tutor

== W ==
- Wanuri Kahiu (1980–), film director, producer and writer
- Wangui wa Goro (1961–), academic and translator
- Koigi wa Wamwere (1949–), politician and writer
- Godwin Wachira (1936–), novelist^{[Killam & Rowe]}
- Charity Waciuma (1936–), novelist^{[Killam & Rowe]}
- Binyavanga Wainaina (1971–2019), founder and editor of Kwani?, winner of the Caine Prize 2002
- Gakaara Wanjau (1921–2001), writer and Gikuyu nationalist
- Wanjikũ wa Ngũgĩ (1970s–), writer
- Binyavanga Wainaina (1971–2019)
- Koigi wa Wamwere (born 1949)
- Kenneth Watene (1944–), playwright^{[Killam & Rowe]}
- Miriam Were (1940–), public health advocate, academic and novelist^{[Killam & Rowe]}

== See also ==
- List of Kenyan artists
