= List of Kenyan women writers =

This is a list of women writers who were born in Kenya or whose writings are closely associated with that country.

== A ==
- Carolyne Adalla, novelist, author of Confessions of an AIDS victim (1993)

== B ==
- Karen Blixen (1885–1962), Danish novelist, short story writer, essayist, active in Kenya

== G ==
- Moraa Gitaa (active since 2008), novelist, short story writer
- Wangui wa Goro (born 1961), poet, novelist, essayist, translator, non-fiction writer

== H ==
- Elspeth Huxley (1907–1997), non-fiction writer, poet, journalist, government adviser

== K ==
- Arya Jeipea Karijo (born 1981), journalist and human rights activist

== L ==
- Muthoni Likimani (born 1926), novelist, non-fiction writer

== M ==
- Olga Marlin (1934–2025), American-born non-fiction writer
- Micere Githae Mugo (1942–2023), playwright, poet, non-fiction writer, educator, activist
- Mwana Kupona (born c.1865), Swahili poet

== N ==
- Christine Nicholls (born 1943), biographer, non-fiction writer
- Rebeka Njau (born 1932), novelist, playwright, educator

== O ==
- Asenath Bole Odaga (1937–2014), publisher and author
- Cristina Odone (born 1960), journalist, newspaper editor, novelist
- Margaret Ogola (1958–2011), novelist, biographer
- Grace Ogot (1930–2015), short story writer, novelist
- Marjorie Oludhe Macgoye (1928–2015), novelist, essayist, poet
- Yvonne Adhiambo Owuor (born 1968), novelist

== P ==
- Shailja Patel (active since 2000), poet, playwright

== R ==
- Rebecca Nandwa (active since 1988), children's writer, writing in Swahili and English

== S ==
- Daphne Sheldrick (1934–2018), wild-life conservationist, writer
- Hazel de Silva Mugot (born 1947), novelist

== W ==
- Charity Waciuma (born 1936), novelist
- Wanjikũ wa Ngũgĩ (born 1970s), short-story writer and novelist
- Miriam Were (born 1940), public health expert, educator, non-fiction writer
- Carolinda Witt (born 1955), yoga specialist and writer

== See also ==
- List of Kenyan men writers
