= 1728 in literature =

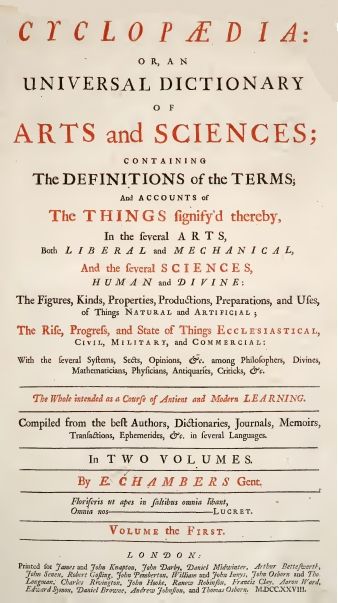
The cover of the 1728 edition of the Chambers Cyclopaedia

This article contains information about the literary events and publications of 1728.

== Events ==
- January 28 – On the night of Esther Johnson's death, Jonathan Swift begins writing The Death of Mrs. Johnson.
- January 29 – John Rich, manager of the theatre at Lincoln's Inn Fields in London, mounts the first production of The Beggar's Opera, a ballad opera by John Gay. Its great success (it initially runs for 62 performances) makes "Rich gay and Gay rich". By the summer, it has been imitated in Thomas Walker's The Quaker's Opera; and William Hogarth begins painting scenes from it.
- May – Jonathan Swift and Thomas Sheridan launch The Intelligencer (periodical).
- October 12 – The Universal Spectator and Weekly Journal is founded by Daniel Defoe and Henry Baker.
- unknown dates
  - The utenzi (epic poem) Utendi wa Tambuka is written by Mwengo, son of Athumani, one of the earliest known examples of Swahili literature.
  - Construction of the Biblioteca Joanina at the University of Coimbra (Portugal), begun in 1717, is completed.

== New books ==
=== Prose ===
- Penelope Aubin – The Life and Adventures of the Young Count Albertus (sequel)
- Peter Browne – The Procedure, Extent, and Limits of Human Understanding
- "Captain George Carleton" – Memoirs of an English Officer
- Ephraim Chambers – Cyclopaedia, or, A Universal Dictionary of Arts and Sciences
- John Dennis – Remarks on Mr. Pope's Rape of the Lock
- James Gibbs – A Book of Architecture
- Eliza Haywood – The Agreeable Caledonian
- Francis Hutcheson – An Essay on the Nature and Conduct of the Passions and Affections
- John Oldmixon
  - The Arts of Logick and Rhetorick
  - An Essay on Criticism
- Robert Lindsay of Pitscottie (died 1580) – The Historie and Chronicles of Scotland, 1436–1565 (written about 1575, in the Scots language)
- Christopher Pitt – An Essay on Virgil's Aeneid
- Antoine François Prévost – Mémoires et aventures d’un homme de qualité qui s’est retiré du monde (begins publication)
- Elizabeth Singer Rowe – Friendship in Death
- Richard Savage – Nature in Perfection
- George Sewell (died 1726) – Posthumous Works of Dr. George Sewell
- Jonathan Swift – A Short View of the State of Ireland
- William Wycherley (died 1716) – The Posthumous Works of William Wycherley, edited by Lewis Theobald (part of Theobald's and Curll's battle with Pope and other "Tory" wits)
- Edward Young – A Vindication of Providence

=== Drama ===
- Richard Barford – The Virgin Queen
- Henry Fielding – Love in Several Masques
- John Gay – The Beggar's Opera
- Pierre de Marivaux – Le Trionphe de Plutus
- John Mottley –
  - The Craftsman
  - Penelope (opera)
- Alexis Piron – Les Fils ingrats
- Lewis Theobald – Double Falsehood, or the Distress'd Lovers (reportedly adapted from Cardenio, by Fletcher and Shakespeare)
- Colley Cibber and John Vanbrugh – The Provoked Husband
- John Sturmy – Sesostris
- Edward Young – The Brothers

=== Poetry ===
- Joseph Addison (died 1719) – The Christian Poet: A miscellany of divine poems
- Thomas Cooke – The Works of Hesiod (first translation of Hesiod into English)
- Henry Fielding (as "by Lemuel Gulliver, Poet Laureat to the King of Lilliput") – The Masquerade
- David Mallet – The Excursion
- Alexander Pope (anonymously) – The Dunciad
- James Ralph
  - Night
  - Sawney: An heroic poem. Occasion'd by the Dunciad
  - Zeuma; or, The Love of Liberty (dated 1729)
- Allan Ramsay – Poems
- Richard Savage – The Bastard
- Thomas Sheridan – The Satyrs of Persius
- James Thomson – Spring (part of The Seasons)
- Ned Ward (anonymously) – Durgen; or, A Plain Satyr upon a Pompous Satyrist (dated 1729)
- Edward Young
  - Love of Fame, the Universal Passion
  - Ocean: An Ode

== Births ==
- Early – Lady Dorothea Du Bois (Dorothea Annesley), Irish writer (died 1774)
- January 9 – Thomas Warton, English literary historian and poet laureate (died 1790)
- March 11 – Robert Bage, English novelist (died 1801)
- September 14 – Mercy Otis Warren, American political writer (died 1814)
- November 10 (probable date) – Oliver Goldsmith, Irish writer and poet (died 1774)

== Deaths ==
- April 25 – John Woodward, English naturalist and antiquary (born 1665)
- February 12 – Cotton Mather, American pamphleteer and minister (born 1663)
- June 23 – Gabriel Daniel, French historian (born 1649
- September 12 – Richard Leigh, English metaphysical poet (born 1649/50)
- September 23 – Christian Thomasius, German publisher and author (born 1655)
- November 13 – William Wall, English theologian (born 1647)
- December 19 – White Kennett, English antiquary, religious writer and bishop (born 1660)
