= Jomo Kenyatta Prize for Literature =

Biennial literary award

The Text Book Centre Jomo Kenyatta Prize for Literature is a biennial literary award given by the Kenya Publishers' Association. It has been called "the most prestigious literary award in the country".

The first award ceremony took place in 1974, however due to financial constraints, it was unable to continue. In 1990, the award was revived with sponsorship from the Text Book Centre, and the first prize was given in 1992. Beginning in 2015, the award's official name was changed to Text Book Centre Jomo Kenyatta Prize for Literature.

== Honorees ==
1974

- English winner: Meja Mwangi, Kill Me Quick
- Kiswahili winner: Abdilatif Abdalla, Sauti ya Dhiki

1992

- First prize: Wahome Mutahi, Three Days on the Cross
- First prize: David Maillu, The Broken Drum

1995

- First place: Margaret Ogola, The River and the Source
- Second place: Marjorie Oludhe Macgoye, Homing In
- Third place: Sam Kahiga, Paradise Farm

1997

- English winner: Ngumi Kibera, Grapevine Stories
- Kiswahili winner: Emmanuel Mbogo, Vipuli vya Figo
- Children's winner: Ezekiel Alembi, Settling the Score

1999

- (no awards)

2001

- English winner: Meja Mwangi, The Last Plague
- Kiswahili winner: Kyalo Wamitila, Nguvu ya Sala
- Children's winner: Lily Mabura, Ali the Little Sultan

2003

- English Adult Fiction first place: Stanley Gazemba, The Stone Hills of Maragoli
- English Adult Fiction second place: Tobias Otieno, The Missing Links
- English Adult Fiction third place: Paul Nakitare, I Shall Walk Alone
- English Children's first place: Wahome Mutahi, The Ghost of Garbatula
- Kiswahili first place: Ken Walibora, Ndoto ya Amerika

2005

- English Adult Fiction first place: (no prize)
- English Adult Fiction second place: Muroki Ndung’us, A Friend of the Court
- English Adult Fiction third place: Valerie Cuthbert, Wings of the Wind
- Kiswahili Adult first place: Kyalo Wamitila, Musaleo
- Kiswahili Adult second place: Ken Walibora, Kufa Kuzikana
- Kiswahili Adult third place: Kyalo Wamitila, Pango
- English Youth first place: Bill Ruto, Death Trap
- Kiswahili Children's first place: Ruth Wairimu Karani, Kofia ya kadogo

2007

- English Adult Fiction first place: Marjorie Oludhe Macgoye, A Farm Called Kishinev
- English Adult Fiction second place: Margaret Ogola Place of Destiny
- English Adult Fiction third place: Wanjiru Waithaka, The Unbroken Spirit
- Kiswahili Adult first place: Kyalo Wamitila, Msimu wa Vipepeo
- Kiswahili Adult second place: Joseph Muthee, Kizuizini
- Kiswahili Adult third place: Kimani Njogu Al Amin Mazrui, Sudana
- English Youth first place: Kingwa Kamencu, To Grasp at Star
- English Youth second place: Ken Walibora, Innocence Long Lost
- English Youth third place: Meja Mwangi, Boy Gift
- English Children's first place: Kabaru Ndegwa, The Wonderful Ball
- English Children's second place: Kyalo Wamitila, The Mysterious Box and the Magic Spoon
- English Children's third place: Nyambura Mpesha, Far Far Away
- Kiswahili Children's first place: Nyambura Mpesha, Hanna na Wanyama

2009

- English Adult Fiction first place: Henry Ole Kulet, Blossoms of the Savannah
- English Adult Fiction second place: Rhodia Mann, Hawecha: A Woman for All Time
- English Adult Fiction third place: Meja Mwangi, Big Chief
- Kiswahili Adult first place: Kyalo Wamitila, Unaitwa Nani
- Kiswahili Adult second place: Mwenda Mbatia, Vipanya Vya maabara
- Kiswahili Adult third place: Kala Tufaha, Omar Babu
- English Youth first place: Stephen Mugambi, Walk with me Angela
- English Youth second place: Juliet Barnes, Lake of Smoke
- Kiswahili Youth first place: Sheila Ali Ryango, dago wa munje
- Kiswahili Children's first place: Kisasi Hapana, Ken Walibora
- Kiswahili Children's second place: Bifungu Matundura, Sitaki iwe siri
- Kiswahili Children's third place: Atibu Bakari, Ngoma za Uchawi
- English Children's first place: Elizabeth Kabui, The Prize

2011

- English Adult Fiction first place: Yusuf Dawood, Eye of the Storm
- English Adult Fiction second place: Ng'ang'a Mbugua, Terrorists of the Aberdare
- English Adult Fiction third place: Joe Kiarie, The Lone Dancer
- Kiswahili Adult first place: Timothy M. Arege, Kijiba cha Moyo
- Kiswahili Adult second place: Alex Ngure, Utoro
- Kiswahili Adult third place: John Habwe, Fumbo la Maisha
- English Youth first place: Eva Kasaya, Tale of Kasaya
- English Youth second place: Muthoni wa Gichuru, Breaking the Silence
- English Youth third place: Leonard Kibera Njenga, The Reunion
- Kiswahili Youth first place: Godfrey Ipalei, Mlemavu? Si Mimi
- Kiswahili Youth second place: Pauline K. Kyovi, Kipendacho Roho
- Kiswahili Children's first place: Nuhu Z. Bakari, Wema wa Mwana
- Kiswahili Children's second place: Enan Mwakoti, Msichana Aliyeokoa Watu
- Kiswahili Children's third place: Florence Nyakeri, Sungura na Mbwa
- English Children's first place: Peter Kimani, Upside Down
- English Children's second place: Elizabeth O. Mazuri, Sheila, Let's Write to God
- English Children's third place: Christopher Okemwa, Let us Keep Tiger

2013

- English Adult: Henry Ole Kulet, Vanishing Herds
- Kiswahili Adult: Tom Olali, Watu wa Gehenna
- English Youth: David Mulwa, We Come in peace
- Kiswahili Youth: Patrick W. Kuloba, Mambo Kangaja
- English Children's: Kap Kirwok, I Blame the Sky
- Kiswahili Children's: Rebecca Nandwa, Nimefufuka

2015

- English Adult: Yvonne Adhiambo Owuor, Dust
- Kiswahili Adult: John Habwe, Pendo la karaha
- English Youth: Edward Mwangi, The Tissue Boy
- Kiswahili Youth: Ken Walibora, Nasikia Sauti ya mama
- English Children's: Stanley Gazemba, A Scare in the Village
- Kiswahili Children's: Clara Momanyi, Ushindi wa nakate

2017

- English Adult Category: Henry Ole Kulet, The Elephant Dance
- Kiswahili Adult Category: Tom Olali, Mashetani wa Alepo
- Kiswahili Youth Category: Mwenda Mbatiah, Majilio ya Mkombozi
- English Youth Category: Goro wa Kamau, Ghost and the Fortune Hunters
- English Children Category: Muthoni Muchemi, Koko Riko

2019

- English Adult Category: Mutu Wa Gethoi, Elders of the Mace
- Kiswahili Adult Category: Mwenda Mbatiah, Watoto Wa Mwelusi
- English Youth Category: Kinyanjui Kombani, Do or Do
- Kiswahili Youth Category: Hassan Ali, Picha Ya Karne
- English Children Category: Jennie Marima, Trio Troubles
- Kiswahili Children Category: Simiyu Mukuyuni, Busara Na Hekima
- Wahome Mutahi Literary Award: Kinyanjui Kombani, Of Pawns and Players
