= List of wars involving Kenya =

This is a list of wars involving the Republic of Kenya and its predecessor states.

Conflict	Combatant 1	Combatant 2	Result	President of Kenya	Kenyan losses	
Conflict	Combatant 1	Combatant 2	Result	President of Kenya	Military	Civilian
Battle of Shela (1812)	Zahidi Mngumi of Lamu	Sultan Ahmed of Pate	Victory for Lamu	Not applicable	Not applicable	
Mau Mau Uprising (1952–1960)	KLFA	United Kingdom	Defeat: British forces put down the rebellion	Not applicable	12,000– 20,000+	Disputed
Shifta War (1963–1967)	Kenya	NFDLM	Victory: Rebels disarm and surrender	Jomo Kenyatta	4,200+ (Civilians and combatants)	
Kenyan–Ugandan border conflict (October 1987–August 1990)	Kenya; NOM	Uganda; Mwakenya Movement	Return to the status quo ante bellum: Kenya–Uganda relations strained	Daniel arap Moi		
Mount Elgon Insurgency (2005–2008)	Kenya	SLDF	Victory: Defeat of the SLDF guerilla	Mwai Kibaki	~600 (Civilians and combatants)	
War in Somalia (2011–present)	Somalia; AMISOM/ATMIS: Kenya; Ethiopia; Uganda; Burundi; Djibouti; Sierra Leone; United States; United Kingdom	Al-Shabaab; Hizbul Islam Islamic State	Ongoing: Operation Linda Nchi launched in 2011, Kenya joins AMISOM (replaced in 2022 by ATMIS)	Mwai Kibaki	Unclear	Unclear
