= Nderitu =

Nderitu is both a given name and a surname. Notable people with the name include:

- Nderitu Gachagua (1952–2017), Kenyan politician
- Alexander Nderitu (born 1979), Kenyan novelist
- Alice Wairimu Nderitu (born 1968), Kenyan United Nations Special Adviser on the Prevention of Genocide to UN Secretary-General
- Ann Nderitu, Kenyan registrar
- John Nderitu, Kenyan politician
- Rigathi Gachagua (born 1965), Kenyan politician
- Wilfred Nderitu, Kenyan lawyer
