= Swahili literature =

Literature in the Swahili language

Swahili literature is literature written in the Swahili language, particularly by Swahili people of the East African coast and the neighboring islands. It may also refer to literature written by people who write in the Swahili language. It is an offshoot of the Bantu culture.

The first literary works date back to the beginning of the 18th century, when all Swahili literature was written in Arabic script. Jan Knappert considered the translation of the Arabic poem Hamziya from the year 1652 to be the earliest Swahili written text. In the second half of the 19th century, European missionaries and scholars of African languages introduced the Latin script for writing the Swahili language.

== Characteristics ==
Swahili literature has been an object of research by many western scholars since the 19th century. There is a debate regarding objectivity as a few scholars tried to establish a canon of Swahili writing.

One of the main characteristics of Swahili literature is the relative heterogeneity of the Swahili language. One can find works written in Kiamu (see for example the poetry by Ustadh Mau), Kimvita, Kipemba, Kiunguja, Kimrima, Kimtang'ata, Ki-Dar es Salaam and Ki-Nairobi which are considered varieties of Swahili.

Swahili literature has been sometimes characterized as Islamic by some western scholars such as Jan Knappert. This approach was criticized by others such as Alamin Mazrui and Ibrahim Noor Shariff. In fact, Swahili poetry has produced many secular works by poets such as Muyaka bin Ghassany and Muhammad Kijuma.

Because of this orientalist exploration and interest in the Swahili culture and language, most of the theses made on the Swahili literature have been done outside of the native place.

== Classification ==
Swahili literature is classified into three genres: Riwaya (the novel), tamthilia (drama/play) and ushairi (poetry). Scholars, however, cite the problem in the literary classification because the association to Western genres does not correspond properly to Swahili literature. The lack of clear and decisive characteristics for genres can be illustrated by the convergence of oral and written literary forms. Rajmund Ohly noted that the names of genres are not well defined while denominations are too vague to distinguish genre divisions.

== Fiction ==
Historically, fiction in Swahili literature mainly consisted of oral narrative traditions. It was not until the 1940s that Swahili started to have a written fiction. Modern Swahili literature is a direct result of the standardization of Swahili. Previously, writers would write in a particular dialect to show their attachment to this local language, such as in Lamu, Tanga or Mombasa. The normalization of Swahili motivated writers such as George Mhina and Lyndon Harries to promote the development of Swahili by creating a literary corpus.

== Poetry ==
Swahili poetry shares many similarities with Arabic poetry. Swahili poetry or "ushairi" (from Arabic: šiʕr, poetry) is still written in the traditional manner. According to an account, the traditional poetry is created to be sung rather than read. It began in the northern Kenya coastal towns of Lamu and Pate before spreading to Tanga Region, Zanzibar and other nearby areas. The poetic tradition is still alive today as pieces are often published in local newspapers or used in taraab songs and musical theater popular in Zanzibar and on the Swahili coast.

However, there are a few fundamental differences between the Swahili and Arabic poetry. With much of African influence, the two poems can hardly be compared for it is sui generis. Classical Swahili prosody is syllabic: as codified by Swahili poets such as Kaluta Amri Abedi and Ibrahim Noor Shariff, a line is defined by a fixed syllable count (mizani), by rhyme (vina), and by an unrhymed caesura placed after a fixed number of syllables (kiwango), without any reference to stress or metrical feet.

Traditional poetry can be classified into different groups according to its form and content. It can be epic, lyrical or didactic, as well as religious or secular. Examples of narrative poetry, known as utenzi, include the Utendi wa Tambuka by Bwana Mwengo (dated to about 1728) and the Utenzi wa Shufaka.

Use of Swahili prose was until recently practically restricted to utilitarian purposes. However, the traditional art of oral expression in poetry has produced a number of valuable works. It is characterized by its homiletic aspects, heroic songs, folklore ballads and humorous dialogues which accurately depict Swahili life, cultural beliefs and traditions. Because of the immediate historical aspect of the Swahili literature, especially in the 19th century, it is still a hard job to interpret many of the poems due to the lack of knowledge of the context in which the poem was written.

=== Swahili Poetry development stages ===
==== Stone age stage ====
This period started shortly after human become conscious of their environment. It dates from beginning of life to 600BC. Human were much involved in hunting and gathering as their source of livelihood before, with introduction of agriculture their lives became more settled and they started living in families. In this stage human being invented poetry that he used to recite or sing during work. At this stage poetry was only used for entertainment and motivation during work and later in the evening as entertainment after work.

==== 10th to 16th century stage ====
This was period of rise of cities along coastal region of East Africa. Cities like Lamu, Pate, Unguja and Mombasa were rising rapidly. Poetry in this period was thematically associated by boasting, moaning and worok poems. Mulokozi and T. Senko say that this period was associated with Fumo Liyongo poems. Most of his poems were not documented. One of his earliest poem called Swifa ya Mwanamang that Mulokozi and Senko (1995) say its the earliest of his poems to be documented.

== Drama ==
Ebrahim Hussein (born 1943 in Lindi, Tanganyika Territory) is a Tanzanian playwright and poet. His first play, Kinjeketile (1969), written in Swahili, and based on the life of Kinjikitile Ngwale, a leader of the Maji Maji Rebellion, is considered "a landmark of Tanzanian theatre". His works have been studied both in Tanzanian and Kenyan schools and universities.

Hussein's work stands in a literary tradition expressed in Swahili following Tanzania's independence from the United Kingdom in 1961. Since his works, with the exception of Kinjeketile and another play, have not been translated, his work has not become well known outside of East Africa. Referring to the absence of Hussein's international recognition and the predicament of African literature written in African languages, French scholar Alain Ricard wrote:

A truly innovative and creative writer, a perceptive thinker, a gifted poet, he has often suffered neglect precisely because he has remained steadfastly committed to Kiswahili. His predicament illustrates the double-bind situation that menaces African literature in African languages. An international reputation is only possible when African-language works are translated into European languages, but few African-language works are translated.

— Alain Ricard, Ebrahim's predicament, p. 178

Other notable Tanzanian playwrights are Amandina Lihamba and Penina Muhando.

== Notable literary people ==
- Farouk Topan, Zanzibar
- Christopher Mwashinga (1965-), Tanzania
- Dada Masiti (c. 1810s–15 July 1919), Kenya
- Ebrahim Hussein (1943- ), Tanzania
- Muhammed Said Abdulla (1918–1991), Tanzania
- Fadhy Mtanga (1981 -), Tanzania
- May Balisidya (?- 1987), Tanzania
- Said Khamis (12 December 1947-), Zanzibar
- Abdilatif Abdalla (14 April 1946-), Kenya
- Ali Alamin Mazrui (1933–2014), Kenya
- Shaaban bin Robert (1909–1962), Tanzania
- Haji Gora Haji, Zanzibar

== See also ==
- African literature
- Siku Njema
- Utendi wa Tambuka "The Story of Tambuka"
- Utenzi "a form of narrative poetry"

== Bibliography ==
- Bertoncini-Zúbková, Elena (1996). Vamps and Victims - Women in Modern Swahili Literature. An Anthology. Rüdiger Köppe Verlag. pp. 134–137. ISBN 3-927620-74-2.
- Bertoncini-Zúbková, Elena (December 1989). Outline of Swahili Literature: Prose, Fiction and Drama. Brill. p. 353. ISBN 90-04-08504-1.
- Knappert, Jan (December 1979). Four Centuries of Swahili Verse: A Literary History and Anthology. Heinemann. p. 333 p. ISBN 0-435-91702-1.
- Knappert, Jan (1982) 'Swahili oral traditions', in V. Görög-Karady (ed.) Genres, forms, meanings: essays in African oral literature, 22–30.
- Knappert, Jan (1983) Epic poetry in Swahili and other African languages. Leiden: Brill.
- Knappert, Jan (1990) A grammar of literary Swahili. (Working papers on Swahili, 10). Gent: Seminarie voor Swahili en de Taalproblematiek van de Ontwikkelingsgebieden.
- Nagy, Géza Füssi, The rise of Swahili literature and the œuvre of Shaaban bin Robert (Academic journal)
- Topan, Farouk, Why Does a Swahili Writer Write? Euphoria, Pain, and Popular Aspirations in Swahili Literature (Academic journal)
- Lodhi, Abdulaziz Y. and Lars Ahrenberg (1985) Swahililitteratur - en kort šversikt. (Swahili literature: a short overview.) In: Nytt från Nordiska Afrikainstitutet, no 16, pp 18–21. Uppsala. (Reprinted in Habari, vol 18(3), 198-.)
- The Political Culture of Language: Swahili, Society and the State (Studies on Global Africa) by Ali A. Mazrui, Alamin M. Mazrui
