= Mwakenya Movement =

Kenyan Leftist Rebel Group

Union of Patriotic Kenyans
- Muungano wa Wazalendo wa Kenya
- Spokesperson: Ngũgĩ wa Thiong'o
- Dates active: 1982–1990s
- Ideology: Socialism; Democracy; Left-wing nationalism
- Political position: Left-wing

The Mwakenya Movement (Muungano wa Wazalendo wa Kukomboa Kenya, meaning "Union of Patriots for the Liberation of Kenya") was an underground movement in Kenya in the 1980s formed by a community opposed to president Moi's rule.

== Background and formation ==
When Daniel arap Moi became president of Kenya in 1978, many prominent politicians and academics accused him of corruption, nepotism and embezzlement of public funds. After the failed coup d'état of 1982, Moi seized the opportunity to make Kenya a de jure one party state. The country had been a de facto one party state since 1969. This move was met by opposition and university campuses, especially the University of Nairobi, became hotbeds of political activities advocating for the repeal of section 2A of the constitution which had made Kenya a de jure single party state.

In the mid-1970s, underground movements started cropping up with publications, such as Chache Group's Independent Kenya, being their main tool. This led to the eventual formation of the December 12th Movement (DTM) and its Pambana publication. It is from the December 12th Movement that Mwakenya rose. The movement would be officially formed in 1985.

Initially, Mwakenya was not a clandestine organization. Its members advocated for the opening up of democratic space in Kenya through public lectures and issuing of leaflets including Mpatanishi and Mzalendo. These lectures and leaflets served the purpose of explaining what they (Mwakenya members) felt was wrong in the country's political sphere. However, after the government began cracking down on its members, the organization went underground.

Mwakenya accepted funding from certain Western leftist organizations, for which it was criticized by DTM members who feared that the movement would become comparable to a typical NGO. The movement was officially atheist and opposed to tribalism. However, despite its stance against ethnic division, it was primarily a Luo and Kikuyu movement and occasionally seemed to cater to those groups' specific interests. Prof. Ngũgĩ wa Thiong'o was the movement's spokesman.

== Arrests ==
Two months before the 1982 coup attempt took place, the Moi regime already arrested several members of DTM. Soon after the coup attempt, the regime, through the Special Branch, launched a hunt for all people it considered traitors and who it believed had had a hand in the attempted coup. Most of these were university lecturers. Some of the first people to be arrested include Maina wa Kinyatti, Prof. Katama Mkangi, Wanyiri Kihoro and Paddy Onyango. Most arrests of Mwakenya members took place in March 1986.

Plain clothes police officers and even university students were recruited by the government to monitor what was taught in classrooms. The main focus was on university lecturers who taught Marxist-Leninist theories - a subject the government believed was being advocated by Mwakenya's members. Those arrested were tortured and subjected to various human rights violations until they accepted that they were Mwakenya members and gave information to the authorities on other members. This was corroborated by Moi when, at a student gathering in London in 1989, said, "We only torture detained members of the disruptive dissident group, Mwakenya. Otherwise how are we going to get important information from them? They are out to destroy everything we value in our society." Most of this torture took place at Nyayo House and Nyati House in Nairobi.

Bernard Chunga, the then Deputy Public Prosecutor, prosecuted most of the Mwakenya cases. Some suspects were arrested, charged and convicted within one day. Most were not allowed to have legal representation. Chunga would tell the presiding judges that the suspects had devised various ways to overthrow the government through an underground organization called Mwakenya. H. H. Buch, who was the Nairobi chief magistrate then, heard a majority of the cases.

Moi told the public that Mwakenya members were not ordinary Kenyans but rather bearded intellectuals who were keen on serving their foreign masters at the expense of the common citizen. He said that they all had passports and would flee Kenya the moment the country was plunged into turmoil, a luxury not many Kenyans had.

=== Prominent detainees ===
The following are some of the notable people who were detained on charges of being affiliated with the Mwakenya Movement:

- Wanyiri Kihoro
- Kiongo Maina
- Mwandawiro Mghanga
- Katama Mkangi
- Wahome Mutahi
- Lumumba Odenda
- Oduor Ong'wen (once Chairman, NGO Council)
- Karimi Nduthu
- Tirop Kitur
- Kan'ngethe Wa Mungai

== Women protests ==
In 1992, mothers from Central Kenya whose sons had been arrested for involvement with the Mwakenya Movement gathered at Uhuru Park, after their efforts to have attorney general Amos Wako release their sons failed. These mothers included Nobel Peace laureate Wangari Maathai and Monica Wangu Wamwere, Koigi wa Wamwere's mother. The women had staged a hunger strike at the park for several months before the Moi administration sent security forces to chase the women away. The women retaliated by stripping naked. This caused most of the security officers to flee as it is considered a curse in some communities for one to see a mother's nudity. By July 1993, all detainees had been freed. The section of Uhuru Park where the women had pitched their tents is now called 'Freedom Corner'.

== Ugandan involvement ==
President Moi strongly suspected that the National Resistance Movement (NRM) (which governed Uganda since 1986) was supporting the Mwakenya Movement. The Mwakenya and NRM were both left-leaning groups, while the Kenyan government and the NRM government were hostile towards each other. The Kenyan government confirmed that NRM officials allowed Mwakenya fighters to travel freely through Uganda, providing them with passports and other documents. In turn, Kenya armed and funded rebels in Uganda. The two countries almost went to war with each other over these issues in 1987 and 1990.
