= Katama Mkangi =

Kenyan author and sociologist

- Died: 6 March 2004 (aged 59–60)
- Citizenship: Kenyan
- Education: University of Dar es Salaam (B.A); University of Sussex (M.A) (Ph.D.)
- Occupations: Socio-political activist; Novelist; Sociology Professor
- Notable work: Ukiwa (1975); Mafuta (1984); Walenisi (1995)
- Spouse: Dr Joyce Kaendi Munguti
- Children: 2

George Chamanje Katama Mkangi was a Kenyan novelist, sociologist, and pro-democracy activist. He was born in Ribe Location, Kaloleni Constituency, Kilifi County, and is known both as a lecturer in Sociology and as a writer whose novels engaged deeply with Kenya's social and political realities. Beyond academia and literature, Mkangi was an advocate for human rights and democratic reforms.

== Education ==
Mkangi Katama earned a B.A. in education with Honors from the University of Dar es Salaam, Tanzania, in 1971. He then pursued postgraduate studies at the University of Sussex in England, obtaining an M.A. in Sociology of Development in 1973 and later completing a Ph.D. in the same field in 1978. His PhD dissertation was titled Population Growth & Myth of Land Reform in Taita.

== Politics ==
=== Contribution to the second liberation struggle ===
President Moi waged a war against intellectualls, whom he considered to be critical of his administration. He accused them of spreading Marxism to the people. Mkangi was an active fighter for democracy against this Presidency of Daniel Moi which was characterised by authoritarianism.

Mkangi alongside other progressive lecturers and academicians such as Ngũgĩ wa Thiong'o, Maina wa Kinyatti, Micere Githae Mugo, Alamin Mazrui, Abdilatif Abdalla used literary work and teachings to expose the injustices of the Moi regime. This made universities such as University of Nairobi and Kenyatta University hubs of resistance and opposition. After the coup attempt in 1982, the Moi government became even more repressive against anyone challenging their authoritarian leadership.

In early 1986 Katama Mkangi was arrested and detained without trial alongside Ngotho Kariuki, Maina wa Kinyatti and Gibson Kamau Kuria, among others, during a crackdown on the Mwakenya Movement. The Mwakenya Movement had been known to advocate for multiparty democracy.

Mkangi alongside nine other political detainees including Raila Odinga were released in February 1988, a month before the parliamentary elections. They spoke about the police brutality and torture that they endured while in prison. Mkangi had been in prison for two years.

=== 1997 presidential elections ===
Katama Mkangi vied for presidency and the Kaloleni Constituency seat in the 1997 general elections. He was amongst the fifteen candidates. He vied under the Kenya National Congress Party (KNC).

He lost both the presidential and parliamentary elections, receiving 23,554 votes, which accounted for 0.38% of the 6,189,684 votes cast in the presidential race.

== Career ==
=== Novels ===
As a novelist Katama Mkangi published several books. Some of his notable publications are:

- Ukiwa (1975)
- Mafuta (1984)
- Walenisi (1995)
- Ningekuwa na Uwezo (1999)
- Ngano za Mfalme Tapwara Tapwara (2003)

The book Walenisi is one of the five inaugural African literature selections that are to be translated to English in 2026 through the African Language Literatures in Translation series by the University of Georgia Press. The book will bear the title They Are Us and the English translation will be done by Richard Prins.

=== Scholarly publications ===
- Mkangi, Katama. The Social Cost of Small Families : A Critique on Demographic Transition. Center for Development and the Environment, University of Oslo, 1992.
- Mkangi, Katama, and International Commission of Jurists. Kenya Section. Practices, Principles and Institutions of Good Governance and Accountability in Moral. Published by Claripress Ltd. on behalf of International Commission of Jurists Kenya Section, Kenya Human Rights Commission, Law Society of Kenya, 1994
- Mkangi, Katama, and National Seminar on Contemporary Islam in Kenya. The Perception of Islam by the Mijikenda of Kenya Coast. Mewa Publications, 1995.
- Mkangi, Katama, and Politics Regional Conference on Law. A Critical Reappraisal of the Socio-Cultural Background to the Anti-Democratic Culture in East Africa. Claripress, 1996.

=== Achievements ===
His novels and scholarly work have featured in and inspired several research work, including

- Wamitila, Kyallo Wadi. "Towards Unlocking Kataka Mkangi's Walenisi. A Case of Parabolic Narrative." 1998.
- Benjamin, Jesse (2010) "Representation in Kenya, Its Diaspora, and Academia: Colonial Legacies in Constructions of Knowledge About Kenya's Coast," Journal of Global Initiatives: Policy, Pedagogy, Perspective: Vol. 2: No. 2, Article 9.
- Mbatiah, Mwenda (2017). "Visions of the Future in East African Fiction: A Comparative Exploration of Selected Works in Kiswahili and English."
- Yenjela, Wafula. “Novelistic Dedications as Memoir: The Moral-Political Imagination of Katama Mkangi.” Oxford Research in English, no. 5, 2017, pp. 73–91.
- Enock Matundura wrote a review of the book, Walenisi, that was published in a Kenyan local newspaper, Saturday Nation, in 2024. He also wrote another piece in Taifa Leo in 2018.

=== Teaching ===
Katama Mkangi began his teaching career as a teacher at Ribe Secondary School in 1971. One year later, he became a headmaster at Aggrey High School in Wundanyi.

Upon completing his PhD in 1978, Mkangi began lecturing at the University of Nairobi, Department of Sociology and later served as an external examiner at the University of Dar es Salaam in 1986.

After his detention in 1986, Mkangi struggled to get a job locally.

Mkangi also had international stints in his career, serving as a visiting Fulbright Scholar in Residence at the Department of Sociology, Carroll College between 1998 and 1999.

At the time of his death, he was an associate professor of sociology at the United States International University Africa, a position he held since 1995.

== Death ==
Mkangi died in a road accident on March 6, 2004, while on his way to Mombasa. He died on the spot after his car was involved in a head-on collision with another vehicle.
