= Verjee =

Verjee is a surname. Notable people with the surname include:

- Iman Verjee, Kenyan writer
- Rumi Verjee (born 1957), British businessman, philanthropist and peer
- Sabrina Verjee (born 1980/81), British ultramarathon runner
- Zain Verjee (born 1974), Kenyan journalist
- Zainub Verjee (born 1956), Kenyan video artist, curator and writer
