= Utenzi wa Shufaka =

Utenzi wa Shufaka (Swahili: "Poem of Mercifulness") is an utenzi (classical narrative poem) in Swahili literature. It is composed of 285 stanzas of four lines of eight-syllables each. The poet-narrator of utenzi offers details of his lineage but never identifies himself.

The only old manuscript of the poem known is held in the library of the German Oriental Society in Halle. This copy, which is written in Arabic script, was sent by Ludwig Krapf from Africa (most probably, German East Africa) in 1854. The poem was published in 1887, followed by a Latin-script transliteration in 1894 by Carl Gotthilf Büttner. Jan Knappert offered the first English translation in 1967, though he also introduced a number of significant mistranslations.

The original title is Chuo cha Utenzi ("A book of poetry in utenzi meter"). This was changed by Büttner to a title he felt was more descriptive.

== Plot ==
A long time ago, the angels Gabriel and Michael had an argument. Both agreed that in the distant past humans were kind and compassionate towards each other. However, while Gabriel held that this was still true, Michael argued that humans had lost the quality of compassion. To settle the dispute, they agreed to carry out a test.

The two descended to Medina, where Gabriel appeared at the mosque as a severely ill man and Michael appeared in the marketplace as a physician. The townspeople pitied Gabriel and offered him money to go find a healer. Gabriel said that he knew of one and took them to Michael. Michael stated that he could cure Gabriel but only with the blood of a sacrificed young man, in particular a seventh son who was the only surviving after his six siblings had died in infancy. The only man fitting the description was Kassim, the son of the wealthiest man of the village. The townspeople agreed and explained to Kassim's father, who agreed but said his wife must agree. His wife agreed, but said that Kassim must also agree, which he did. Michael then stated the father must be the one to kill his son. Sorrowing, the father does so. The angels vanish, leaving the townspeople to prepare a burial.

In Heaven, Michael agrees with Gabriel that humans still possess exemplary compassion. The angels appeal to God to resurrect Kassim. God grants permission and the angels return to the town as different person, who return to Kassim's family and say that they are hungry and thirsty. The bereaved father tells his wife to prepare food and drink. Gabriel invokes God to bring all seven of the sons to life and the whole town celebrates. The angels return to Heaven, where they prophesy that in the future humans will lose their compassion and become obsessed with their physical well-being and material wealth. The poet concludes by stating that this prophecy has been fulfilled.

== Significance ==
Jan Knappert stated that Utenzi wa Shufaka was important because of its age and because it is one of the most remarkable pieces of Swahili literature, though he did not elaborate on why he thought it was remarkable.

In 1920, Alice Werner wrote:

It is difficult to relate this [epic] seriously in English but, strange as it may seem, it has certain pathos in the original. The emotions of the parents are dwelt on at great length, and the poem is enormously popular especially among Swahili women.

== See also ==
- Swahili literature
- Utenzi
- Abraham and Ishmael in Islam
