= Ken Walibora =

Kenyan author and writer

Professor Ken Walibora
- Born: Kennedy Wafula Waliaulaa; 6 January 1965; Bungoma District, Western Province, Kenya
- Died: 10 April 2020 (aged 55); Nairobi, Kenya
- Resting place: Cherangany Constituency
- Citizenship: Kenyan
- Education: University of Nairobi, Ohio University
- Occupations: Author, writer
- Notable work: Siku Njema, Kidagaa Kimemwozea, Ndoto za Ameika
- Spouse: Ann Chebet
- Relatives: Patrick Lumumba(brother)
- Awards: Jomo Kenyatta Literature Prize(2003, 2009)

Kennedy Wafula Waliaula, better known by his pen name Ken Walibora (6 January 1965 – 10 April 2020) was a Kenyan writer, journalist, and scholar. He is a known figure in Kenyan Swahili literature, having authored Swahili books, which is Kenya's national language. His books Siku Njema and Kidagaa Kimemwozea were used as a national setbook for Kiswahili literature in Kenyan secondary schools.

== Early life ==
Ken Walibora was born in Baraki, Bungoma District (present-day Bungoma County) of the Western Province in 1965 and grew up in Cherangany and Kitale. He later changed his name to Walibora, with the suffix 'bora' meaning 'better/best' in Swahili. His mother's name was Ruth Makali.

== Education ==
Walibora attended St. Joseph's Primary School in western Kenya for his primary education. He then pursued his high school education at Teremi school and Suremi Secondary School and at Ole Kajiado High School.

He earned his bachelor's degree from the University of Nairobi and graduated with a first-class honors degree in Literature and Swahili studies. He proceeded to do his masters at Ohio University.

== Career ==
He was a writer and author of books in Swahili and wrote novels, poetry, short stories and essays. His works have been translated to German, English, French and Chinese. Walibora was an advocate of Swahili literature and promoted its use and growth. He on more than one occasions called out the government on the fact that the use Swahili, which is the national language, was being restricted in learning institutions with some even having posters declaring the institutions as 'English speaking zone'.

He made contributions to book chapters and articles to academic journals, including the Research in African Literatures (RAL), Swahili Forum, Kiswahili, Canadian Journal of African Studies (CJAS), African Quarterly Review (AQR), Journal of the African Language Teachers Association (JALTA), Journal of the Association of African Literature (JALA) and Curator: The International Museum Journal.

He served as a lecturer at Wisconsin Madison University and Riara University. He also worked as a Swahili news anchor and editor at KBC and Nation Media Group as a probation officer.

== Death, burial and homicide ==
=== Death ===
On 10 April 2020, Walibora was struck by a speeding minibus while crossing Landhies Road near the Machakos Country Bus Park in Nairobi. Eyewitnesses reported that he was being chased by street urchins at the time of the incident. He was rushed to Kenyatta National Hospital (KNH) by a Nairobi County ambulance and admitted to the emergency unit as an unidentified patient.At KNH, Walibora remained in the emergency unit for approximately 14 to 18 hours without receiving full treatment, reportedly due to a lack of identification and occupied ICU beds, before succumbing to his injuries.

=== Probe into the death ===
Police launched an investigation into his death in line with the circumstances leading to his supposed death. His car was parked more than three kilometers from where he left his car on Friday, April 10. The government pathologist Johansen Oduor after an autopsy, revealed he had a deep cut on the space between his thumb and the index finger, consistent with self defence. Police also discovered that Walibora had been having disputes with his publisher over a book in the weeks leading to his death. There was also foul play as he was left unattended to for the entire day after having been taken to Kenyatta national hospital by an ambulance. The case was treated as a homicide and is still unresolved.

=== Burial ===
He was buried at his rural home in Makutano, Cherangany constituency in a funeral procession attended by less than 20 people as per the regulations imposed by the government to curb the spread of coronavirus. His wife and children could not attend the burial as travel restrictions prevented them from travelling to the Kenya from the US where they had been staying at the time. Friends and relatives including his brother, Patrick Lumumba who was the family's spokesperson, asked the government to resolve Walibora's murder and convict the killers.

== Books ==
He was the author of forty titles. His works include:

- Ken Walibora (1996). Siku Njema. Longhorn Publ. ISBN 996-64-9744-7.
- Ken Walibora (2012). Kidagaa Kimemwozea. Target Publ. ISBN 996-60-0286-3.
- Ken Walibora (2003). Kufa Kuzikana. Longhorn Publ. ISBN 9966-49-754-4.
- Ken Walibora. Ndoto Ya Almasi. Moran Publishers and Worldreader. ASIN B01JMHLGCW.
- Ken Walibora and Said Mohamed (2016). Damu Nyeusi na Hadithi Nyingine. Moran Publishers and Worldreader. ASIN B01CLHF3ME.
- Ken Walibora (2016). Ndoto Ya Amerika. Longhorn Publ. and Worldreader. ASIN B06VWP4TX5.

== Awards and recognition ==
Walibora was awarded the Jomo Kenyatta Literature Prize twice for his works Ndoto ya Amerika in 2003 and Kisasi Hapana in 2009.

== See also ==
- Margaret Ogola – Kenyan author
- Kithaka wa Mberia
