= Abdillahi Nassir =

Kenyan Islamic scholar (1932–2022)

Sheikh Abdilahi Nassir
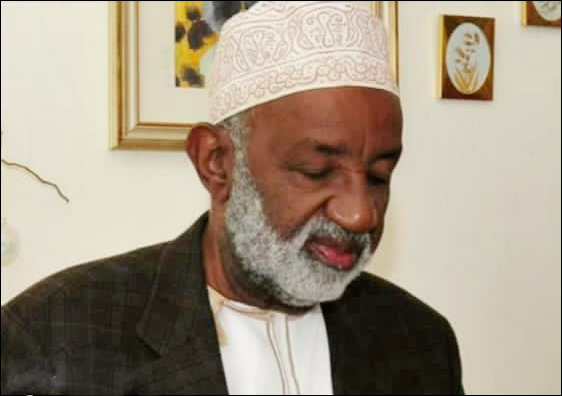
- Hujjat al-Islam Sheikh Abdillahi Nassir.
- Born: 1 June 1932; Mombasa, colonial Kenya
- Died: 11 January 2022 (aged 89); Mombasa
- Resting place: Maziyara ya waKilindini, Ganjoni, Mombasa, Kenya
- Organization: Ahlul Bayt Centre
- Title: Spiritual Leader of the Shia Muslim Community of East Africa
- Children: 10
- Parents: Nassir Juma (father); Maryam Ahmad (mother)
- Relatives: 6 siblings, including Abdilatif Abdalla
- Awards: Freedom of the City Award, Abbasi Medal

Abdilahi Nassir (1 June 1932 – 11 January 2022) was a Kenyan Shia cleric based in Mombasa. Raised a Sunni, Nassir converted to Shiism, and in the wake of Iran's Islamic revolution publicly identified himself as Twelver Shia.

== Early life and education ==
Sheikh Abdillahi Nassir was born in Mombasa on 1 June 1932. His early education commenced with Madrasah education as he enrolled in Madrasah at a young age of four years and continued attending Madrasah from 1936 to 1946. At the same time, he had normal school education, attending the Arab Boys Primary School from 1941 to 1949, and later joined the Zanzibar's Bet-el-Ras Teacher Training College from 1950 to 1951. After completing his studies in Zanzibar, he moved back to Mombasa.

== Early career ==
Upon his return to Mombasa he taught at the Arab Primary School from 1951 to 1954. Because of his health condition, he was medically boarded out. Recovering from his ailment, he then joined the Mombasa Institute of Muslim Education as an accounts clerk and as a part-time religious Instructor, from 1955 to 1957.

He was elected to Kenya's pre-independence Legislative Council and served in this capacity from 1961 to 1963.

On 28 December 1961, Sheikh Abdilahi Nassir was appointed, by the minister for education (at that time), Daniel Toroitich Arap Moi, as one of the members in the Bursary Selection Board to advise the ministry on the award, renewal or variation of bursaries for a period of three years. He was then appointed as one of the members of the Advisory Council on Arab Education, by the Minister of Education (at that time), Lawrence George Sagini, on 5 October 1962.

From 1964 to 1965, he was a full-time politician as member of KANU's executive council (Coast Province). He then worked as an Arabic/Swahili monitor with the BBC in Nairobi from 1965 to 1967.

Later, he joined the Oxford University Press and worked as a Swahili Editor with the Eastern Africa Branch of Oxford University Press in Nairobi from 1967 to 1975. He was the first Swahili Editor to be recruited (at OUP). Nassir played a key role in seeing Julius Nyerere's Swahili translations of Julius Caesar (Julius Kaisari) and The Merchant of Venice (Mabepari wa Venisi) through publication. In 1969, he moved to the Dar es Salam office, where he is credited, together with the manager (Lucius Thonya), with developing the important and lucrative Swahili publishing programme there. These projects meant that OUP was well placed to respond to the demand created by Julius Nyerere's 'Education for Self Reliance' and the introduction of Swahili as a teaching medium in Tanzanian schools.

In 1975, Sheikh Abdillahi left the Oxford University Press to form his own Shungwaya Publishers Ltd. In 1977 he was recalled by the Oxford University Press to head the Eastern Africa Branch as General Manager and served in this capacity from 1977 to 1980.

Nassir's positions have included serving as the principal of the Shia Theological Seminary near Mombasa, and his role in the Coastal People's Party.

== Death ==
Nassir died on Tuesday, 11 January 2022, at the age of 89, in Mombasa, Kenya.

== Awards ==
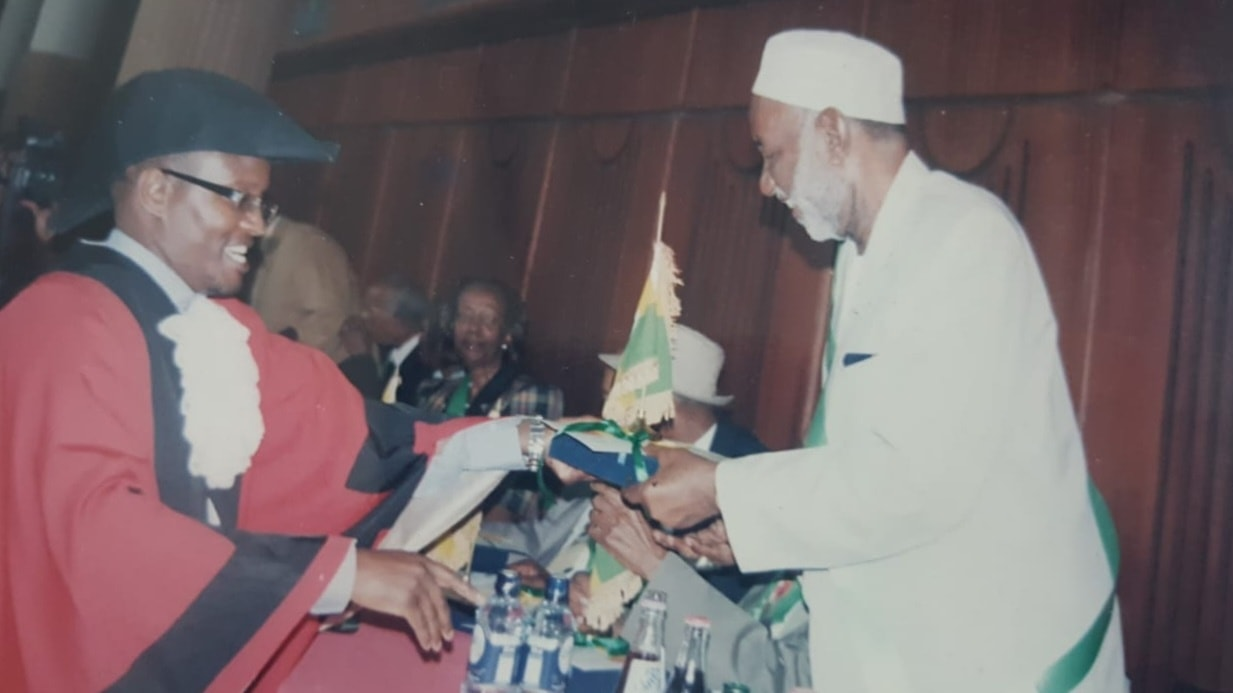
Nairobi mayor Dick Wathika giving Nassir the Freedom of the City Award

On 22 December 2006, Sheikh Abdilahi Nassir was among the 17 Kenyans who received the Freedom of the City of Nairobi Award, issued to those who attended the Lancaster House conference, in the United Kingdom, which gave birth to the Constitution for Independent Kenya.

In April 2011 at the 72nd Supreme Council Session in Mombasa, the then Africa Federation Chairman Alhaj Anwarali Dharamsi bestowed the Abbasi Medal to Sheikh Abdillahi Nassir.

== Selected works ==
- Kamusi Sanifu Ya Msingi. Oxford University Press. ISBN 9780195739077.
- Tafsiri ya Juzuu ya 'Amma. Bilal Muslim Mission of Kenya.
- Tafsiri ya Sura At-Talaq. Shungwaya Publishers.
- Shia na Qur'ani: Majibu na Maelezo. Bilal Muslim Mission of Tanzania. ISBN 9976956819.
- Shia na Sahaba: Majibu na Maelezo. Bilal Muslim Mission of Tanzania. ISBN 9976956835.
- Shia na Hadith: Majibu na Maelezo. Bilal Muslim Mission of Tanzania. ISBN 9976956827.
- Maulidi: Si Bida, Si Haramu. Bilal Muslim Mission of Kenya.
- Ukweli wa Hadith ya Karatasi. Ahlul Bayt Centre. January 2003.
- Mut'a Ndoa ya Halali. Ahlul Bayt Centre.
- Shia na Taqiya: Majibu na Maelezo. Ahlul Bayt Centre. January 2003.
- Malumbano Baina ya Sunni na Shia. Ahlul Bayt Centre.
- Sura Al-Ahzab: Tafsiri na Maelekezo. Ahlul Bayt Centre. 2005.
- Yazid Hakuwa Amirul-Mu'minin. Bilal Muslim Mission of Kenya.
- Hadith Al-Thaqalayn: Hadith Sahihi. Ahlul Bayt Centre.
- Ahlul Bayt: Ni Nani, Si Nani. Ahlul Bayt Centre.
