= Muthoni wa Gichuru =

Kenyan writer

- Born: Alice Muthoni Gichuru; Matanya, Nanyuki, Kenya
- Education: Moi University (BSc Information Science)
- Occupation: Writer
- Spouse: Joseph Kamau
- Writing career
- Language: English
- Genres: Children's literature, Young adult fiction, Short stories
- Notable works: Breaking the Silence (2009); The Hidden Package (2016); Moon Scapes: Short Stories and Poetry (2017); The Carving (2019)
- Notable awards: CODE Burt Award for African Young Adult Literature (2018); Runner-up, Jomo Kenyatta Prize for Literature (2011)

Alice Mūthoni Gìchūrū, who writes as Mūthoni wa Gìchūrū, is a Kenyan writer of fiction for children and young adults, as well as short stories.

== Life ==
Mūthoni wa Gìchūrū grew up in Matanya, a small village in Nanyuki. As a child she recalls her father reading to her from a Gikuyu book titled Kamina na Kamina. She holds a Bachelor of Science degree in information sciences from Moi University.

Gìchūrū's husband, Joseph Kamau, encouraged her to start writing stories in 2002. Her first published book, Breaking the Silence (2009), was runner-up for the 2011 Jomo Kenyatta Prize for Literature in the English-language youth category. The Carving (2019) was the winner of the 2018 CODE Burt Prize for African Young Adult Literature in Kenya.

== Works ==
- Breaking the Silence. Nairobi: East African Educational Publishers, 2009.
- The Hidden Package. Nairobi, Kenya: East African Educational Publishers Ltd., 2016.
- The Other side and Other stories : Nairobi, Kenya:Storymoja Publishers., 2016
- The Bitter Sweet and Other Stories : Nairobi, Kenya:Storymoja Publishers., 2016
- The Scary Trip and Other Stories : Nairobi, Kenya:Storymoja Publishers., 2016
- Beyond the Barricades. Nairobi, Kenya: East African Educational Publishers Limited, 2016.
- Moon Scapes: Short Stories and Poetry. 2017.
- The Carving. Nairobi, Kenya : Longhorn Publishers, 2019.
- Smart Sidi and the Poem. Nairobi, Kenya : Longhorn Publishers, 2019.
- Smart Sidi and the lost ball. Nairobi, Kenya : Longhorn Publishers, 2019.
- Smart Sidi and the play house. Nairobi, Kenya : Longhorn Publishers, 2019.
- Kefa's Quest. Phoenix Arizona, USA : Worlds Unknown Publishers, 2020.

13. Selina and Other Stories Story Moja Publishers, 2022 14. The Case of Persecuted Pangolins - Story Moja Publishers, 2022. 15. Tell it to the birds and other stories. Booklyst Publishers, 2024. 16. The Raw deal and Other stories-. Booklyst Publishers, 2025. 17. The ‘Online Friend’ and Other Stories 18. Onto your marks-Oxford University Press, 2025.
