= Aminata (play) =

Play

Aminata is a 1988 play by Francis D. Imbuga. The main character, Aminata, is a female lawyer who cannot inherit her the land that her late father, Pastor Ngoya had left for her (in his will) Hisvuncle Jumba is opposed to this. According to him (and tradition) women cannot inherit property. The play examines the role of women in African society.
