= Moraa Gitaa =

Kenyan writer

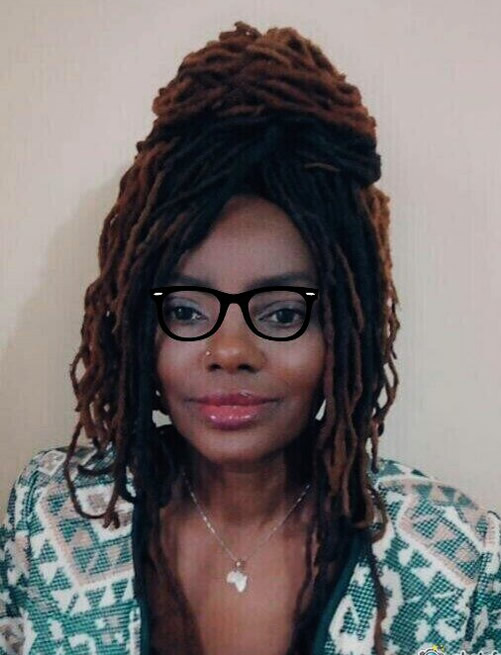
- Born: Mombasa, Kenya
- Education: Africa Nazarene University, Nairobi - BA in Peace and Conflict Studies

Moraa Gitaa is a Kenyan novelist, born in Mombasa. She is also a Peace Studies and Conflict Resolution researcher, cultural advocate and arts curator. She is the author of the YA novels Let's Talk About This, The Kigango Oracle, Hila and The Shark Attack.

== Career ==
Gitaa's debut full-length adult fiction novel, Crucible for Silver and Furnace for Gold, centres on two characters: Lavina, a Kenyan African woman living with HIV, and Giorgio, an Italian man whom Lavina meets on vacation in Malindi on Kenya's coast. Gitaa's sophomore novel is Shifting Sands.

Crucible for Silver and Furnace for Gold has been critiqued by scholars as a re-reading and re-writing of gender in times of HIV. Her work on Shifting Sands received a positive review in the Nairobi Star from Khainga O' Okwemba, who said: "Here is a writer with the patience, perseverance and discipline needed to create vivid characters. Here is a contemporary Kenyan writer capable of bedazzling and cajoling the reader with a skillfully written and scintillating narrative.... Shifting Sands is a must read for literature students." Gitaa's stories focus on the vulnerable, underserved, marginal and marginalized members of contemporary African society.

Gitaa's non-fiction and short stories have been featured in Harvard University's Transition Magazine, PEN International's PEN OutWrite,, IFLAC'S Peace & Anti-Terror Anthology, Spotlight Publisher's Waiting and Other Stories, Creatives Garage Anthology, several Author Me Anthologies, several G21 The World's Magazine Anthologies including Africa Fresh! New Voices from the First Continent, The African Magazine, and Hekaya Initiative

In 2014, James Murua included Gitaa in a list of 39 top African novelists under the age of 40 writing in English.

== Works ==
- Let's Talk About This. Worlds Unknown Publishers, Kenya, 2020
- The Kigango Oracle. Worlds Unknown Publishers, Kenya, 2020
- Hila. Storymoja Publishers, Kenya, 2015
- The Shark Attack. Moran Publishers, Kenya, 2014
- The Con Artist. Kenya Literature Bureau, Kenya, 2014
- Shifting Sands. Nsemia Publishers, Kenya, 2012
- Crucible for Silver and Furnace for Gold. Nsemia Publishers, Kenya, 2008

== Anthologies featured ==
- African Land Policy Center (ALPC) Anthology Finding Ground and Other Stories on land governance in Africa, 2022.
- Hekaya Arts Initiative Issue 01 / Libros Agency: Anthology - Jihadi Bride and Other Stories, Kenya, 2018
- Transition Magazine Issue 121: Theme - Childhood - Hutchins Center for African and African American Research at Harvard University, 2016
- Creatives Garage: Femmolution Volume 01, Kenya, 2016
- Waiting and Other Stories: Spotlight Publishers, Kenya, 2016
- PEN OutWrite - Obscure Oddities: LGBTQI Issue Published by PEN International, 2015
- G2's Anthology - Africa Fresh! New Voices from the First Continent, 2010

== Awards ==
- 2024 Kenya Publishers Association's 25 Notable Authors and Books from the past 25 years with The Shark Attack
- 2024 Nuria Bookstore's Top 100 Authors and Books with Shifting Sands
- 2022-2023 IAS-CEU Writer-in-Residence / Fellow: Institute for Advanced Study - Central European University
- 2022 Jomo Kenyatta Prize for Literature (JKPL) - Shortlisted with "Let's Talk About This"
- 2021 James Currey Prize for African Literature (Longlist)
- 2021 NOMMO Awards (Nominated/Longlist)
- 2017 apexart Fellow
- 2014 Burt Award
- 2010 Penguin Prize for African Writing (Shortlist)
- 2008 National Book Development Council of Kenya - Book Week Literary Awards (First Prize Winner Adult Fiction Category)
