= Siku Njema =

Siku Njema is a Swahili novel written by the Kenyan author, Ken Walibora. The novel was published in 1996 and written in the first person. The book deals with the life of a young man, Msanifu Kombo (nicknamed Kongowea Mswahili) who is born in Tanga, Tanzania and who faces family hardships with his single mother, who is a talented singer of taarab. Being a child born out of wedlock does not make life easier for him, as he is chided by his schoolmates in a culture that frowns upon illegitimate children. When Kongowea's mother (named Zainabu) dies, he is left to fend for himself as he embarks on a Journey to Western Kenya to find his biological father

== Overview ==
In Tanzania, the story dwells mostly on the struggles of Kombo after his mother, Zainabu Makame dies. He has to struggle with school while living through the maltreatment meted by his aunt and foster mother. His brilliance in writing, however, bails him out, and he becomes quite a successful student, later nicknamed Kongowea Mswahili, in reference to a prize-winning essay he had written.

Kongowea Mswahili, after some struggles, manages to move to Kenya in search of his father, whom he had only seen in a snapshot in their house. Life is not easy for the humble Kongowea Mswahili. Often, he is looked down upon by the people he meets while in search of his father. However, his humility, kindness sets him to have a spot in the people's hearts. As the story emphasises, a bad deed can only be paid with a good deed. After other doses of trouble, he finds his father who happened to be a known poet, Juma Mukosi, under the pen name of Amuj Isokum, a backward spelling of his real name. In spite of being a famous poet, Amuj Isokum, who is terminally ill, lives a desolate life and is looked down upon by the entire neighbourhood. It takes a while for Kongowea to find out about his father, and he only does so when the man is already dead.

== Ending ==
The book ends with the protagonist, Kongowea Mswahili, in his house, which he inherited from his father Juma Mukosi, early in the morning in the town of Kitale. He is writing a book, most possibly about his life, when his wife Vumilia binti Abdalla, who was Kongowea's childhood friend, comes from behind and gives him a bear hug. She notes that it is too late and he needs some night rest. He then looks through the window and sees the eastern horizon burning red, indicating that he had been writing for too long.
