= Utenzi =

Utenzi or utend̠i is a form of narrative poetry in Swahili. Its name derives from the fact that it usually describes heroic deeds, like the medieval European gesta (lit. "deeds"). Utendi, plural tendi, meaning "act" or "deed", is derived from the Swahili verb ku-tenda "to do". Well-known examples of utenzi are the Utendi wa Tambuka by Bwana Mwengo (one of the earliest known literary works in Swahili, dated 1728), the Utenzi wa Shufaka, and the Utenzi wa vita vya Uhud (the epic of the battle of Uhud) compiled around 1950 by Haji Chum. Reciting utenzi is a popular pastime on weddings and other ceremonies and feasts; often, specialized narrators are invited to do this.

Utenzi verse form consists of four-line stanzas, with each line having eight syllables. The last syllables of the first three lines rhyme with each other, while the fourth line has a rhyme that is constant throughout the whole of the epic. This last rhyme thus serves to tie all stanzas of the epic together. Within a line of eight syllables there are no further meter requirements, such as a fixed pattern of stresses or beats. The verse form can be illustrated by the first stanza of the Utend̠i wa Tambuka:

Bisimillahi kut̠ubu
yina la Mola Wahhabu
Arraḥamani eribu
na Arraḥimu ukyowa

The first three lines all end in -bu. The last syllable of the fourth line ends in the vowel a, and this sound is found at the end of every stanza of the poem. When recited, this last syllable is sustained for some time and given emphasis.

== See also ==
- Swahili literature
