= Kinyanjui Kombani =

Kenyan writer

- Born: Kinyanjui Kombani; 1981, age 42 years Molo, Kenya
- Education: Kenyatta University
- Occupations: Novelist, Children's Books Writer, Banker
- Writing career
- Language: English
- Notable works: The Last Villains of Molo, Den of Inequities
- Website: kinyanjuikombani.com

Kinyanjui Kombani, popularly known as "The Banker who Writes", is a Kenyan novelist, playwright, scriptwriter, and literature critic/activist. His novels, The Last Villains of Molo and Den of Inequities have been used for undergraduate and postgraduate education by universities in Kenya and abroad. Kombani is also a recipient of the Kenyatta University Outstanding Young Alumni Award 2014 and was recognized as a Business Daily Top 40 under 40 in 2015.

== Early life ==
Kinyanjui Kombani was born in Molo in the then Nakuru District of Rift Valley Province in Kenya. He was the last born in a family of five children. His mother single-handedly catered for the family in a single-roomed mabati house after separating from his father before he was born.

Kinyanjui passed by a Standard Chartered branch on his way to school at Molo Academy for his primary school education, which would later become his employer.

After the 1992 general elections, the ethnically diverse town of Molo was rocked by tribal skirmishes along with numerous others in Rift Valley, prompting his family to move out to his maternal ancestral home in Njoro, where he schooled up to form four.

After the untimely passing of his mother, Kinyanjui was forced to move in with his brothers in Ngando, a slum off Ngong Road in Nairobi. This later inspired the setting for his novel The Last Villains of Molo.

== Education and banking career ==
After completing his secondary school education at Molo Academy in 1998, Kinyanjui Kombani was admitted to Kenyatta University in 2000 and graduated in 2004 with a Bachelor of Education in English & Literature. He also completed a program on Business mentorship at Inoorero University in 2012, becoming a career business mentor.

Afterwards, he successfully applied for a position at Standard Chartered Bank as Customer Relations manager, despite not having graduated with a course in a relevant field. Other positions held there include Personal Financial Consultant, Business Financial Consultant, Relations Manager in Premium Banking, and most recently, the team leader for SME Banking in Kenya.

== Writing career ==
=== Beginnings ===
Kinyanjui Kombani started writing in 2004 while at Kenyatta University, penning a play titled Carcasses for the Meat Trade Awareness project by Born Free Foundation. The play was widely performed by Kenyatta University travelling theatre. In Kenya alone, more than 60,000 rural people viewed the play's performance. It was also staged elsewhere in Africa, Europe, and the United States. In 2004, Kombani also wrote the script for Mizoga, the film adaptation of the play which was shot by Born Free Foundation yet again.

In the same year (2004), his first novel The Last Villains of Molo, was published by Acacia Stantex Publishers, two years after finishing the manuscript and signing a contract. The author stated in interviews that he did not earn royalties from the book for ten years. It was not until Longhorn Publishers released a second imprint in 2012 that the book, and its author, received widespread publicity.

In 2007, the writer moved to Longhorn publishers and published two children's stories; Wangari Maathai: Mother of Trees, and We Can be Friends, the latter of which was reproduced for the Rwandan market a year later in 2008. By this time, Kinyanjui was a well renowned novelist with a considerable fan base.

=== Mastery ===
In 2012, The Last Villains of Molo was republished by Longhorn Publishers. With proper marketing, the book was positively received by critics and the public, and it launched the career of Kinyanjui Kombani as a contemporary novelist. The book was soon approved for use as a study text in several universities in the country, including his Alma mater, Kenyatta University. The novel is also studied in universities in Germany, the United States, and England in both undergraduate and postgraduate levels. In 2014, his second novel Den of Inequities, another odyssey into the experiences of slum life in Nairobi, was published to a positive reception yet again. The text has also been used as a study text in Kenya and Rwanda universities.
