= Eastlandah David (Wesonga) =

== Biography ==
=== Early life ===
Eastlandah was born in Mumias, Kenya to Pamela Keya and Jackson Keya, a family health officer and an accountant cum farmer. He is the last-born in a family of seven. He has two sisters and four brothers. He attended school in Mumias, St Peter's Primary before moving to Maragoli with his mother where he attended St. Francis Hambale Primary school. He is an avowed critic of fathers and men who relegate family duties. He did not get on well with his father.

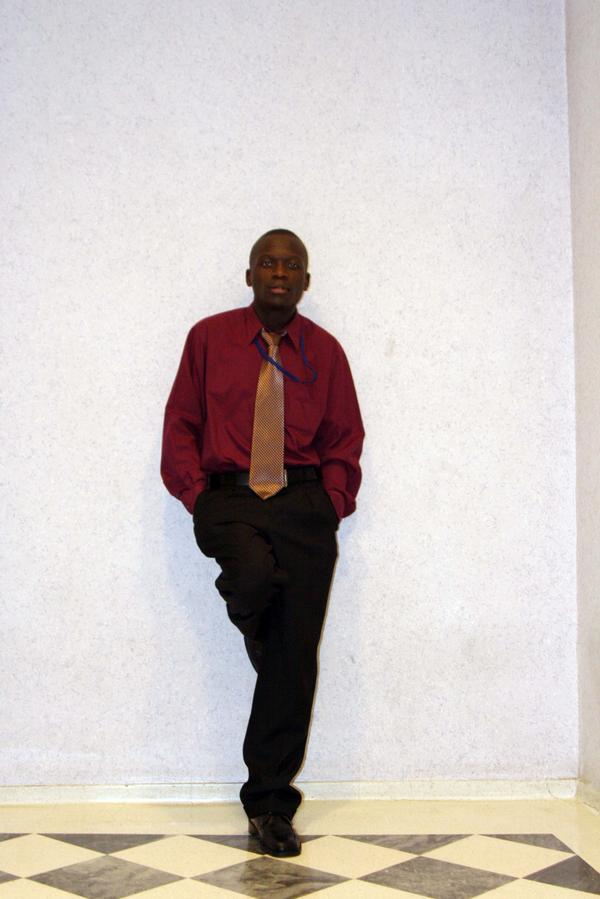
Eastlandah David

=== 2004–2006: educational life and young adulthood ===
Eastlandah David worked at the Mumias posta, before joining college, first Nairobi university, then Daystar university but didn't graduate from either. It is alleged that Eastlandah took and/or dealt drugs during these years, often acting as a middleman, but he has neither publicly acknowledged nor publicly denied such claims. It is however known that close friends associated with the Eastlandah during this period died or fell off the public eye under mysterious circumstances, and most were known drug lords. He however admits in interviews that most of these years were spent on the streets trying to "make an honest dime". Most of his poetic pieces have veiled references to these years in the cold.

=== 2008–present: Eastlandah ===
Eastlandah David founded Eastlandah – the company in 2008 and later on the group in 2009. A futuristic media group, with stakes in recording studios, modelling, management and online media. He is the founder of Afrizo corporate communications and holds stakes in various listed companies in Kenya.

In 2009, Eastlandah was made a youth ambassador by the youth movement international, in a drive to help the U.N. achieve its goals for a positive society. He was later on awarded the Adeste gold Medal, an award to "unsung under 40 heroes of the society", in recognition of his fight for human equity through arts and the written word. It was officially presented to him in Nairobi in April 2009. He was the youngest individual inducted into the international library hall of fame, as a silver entrant for his wide-ranging works, and still is an avowed preacher of "raw" forms of arts.

=== 2008–present: personal life ===
Eastlandah David has had numerous run ins with various entities in his life. His personal life is as colourful and complicated as has been his few years around. From reports that he got a child via surrogacy to others that he is an artist of the wild taking advantage of the ignorant, he seems to elicit mixed reactions upon mention of his name. In 2006, it is known Eastlandah was in a relationship with an unknown woman. He was also at some point engaged to Carol, with whom the break-up largely resulted in a meltdown. It was through this period that he deteriorated, from a sober mind to an alcoholic who relied on alcohol to work. It is understood that the break-up resulted in his quitting live performances as this was the last time he was seen performing on stage and has since stopped his performances. Eastlandah also dated Josephine, a camera lady, and though never substantiated, he is said to have been in a relationship with Carol Kinuthia. At the moment, it is said his first child was conceived of a surrogate mother. He is on record as to having said he is contemplating joining servant-hood and dedicating his life to service and philanthropy. In a live interview, he admitted his relationships have left him broken and hurt and he was in no shape to ever love a woman the way he's loved those who loved him then.

Eastlandah was known for his abrasive approach to work, often appearing in hoods and jeans at Nation Media Group, and unapologetically telling off his seniors. He resigned from N.M.G. following an unknown scandal and eventually retired at a young age from media. At the time of quitting, he was working on IPTV. He was declared bankrupt after this, but also had a show in with the law when tax returns showed he'd not substantiated his income. It is not known whether he did a prison term but he dropped off the radar for the better part of 2010 only to be said to be living as a recluse.

After winning the Adeste award, it was rumoured that he was gay, after comments attributed to him in public in support of gay individuals. He has however clarified saying he meant every human being deserves his entitled rights, but neither denied nor confirmed being gay personally. It is not known whether he is religious but he has Rastafarian credentials. He is said to be a practising Buddhist, a practise he picked during his stint in Cambodia in 2011.

As of 2012, Eastlandah is said to make his home in Dar es Salaam, Tanzania, and an unknown locale in Kenya, where he spends time painting and writing as a recluse and with limited touch with the outside world.

== Poetry and writing ==
=== Poetry and themes ===
Eastlandah David considers himself an underground poet, and never does commercial poetry, save for performances. Known as the "people's poet", his works border on the illicit ends of rhyme and love conjured on streets, and his themes resonate soundly with street life. He has been described as the "inside voice" due to his ability to write from "within" the limit circle, of which one has to be in to bring out so eloquently. He justifies love but chastises and criticises it, social critique is his main forte, but does well with love, violence and madness in equal measures. He began writing at the age of 10 and has done so consistently, save for the few disruptions, when he's been forced to stop out of love.

Though he stopped live performances, he did an epic five-nation tour in 2009, to raise credibility level after being challenged by fellow poet Rodney Kiaka to sound response and overwhelming public support. The tour saw him perform in Nairobi, Johannesburg, Kampala, Maputo and Rwanda.

He is an entrant into the international library of poets hall of fame, as well as a syndicate poet for various organisations.

Word has it that a film based on his life is being shot at unknown locations as of 2011, and will be released 2012.

=== Influences ===
Eastlandah cites Maya Angelou as his main influence. He also notes Bishop, Malcolm X, William Shakespeare, Ben Jonson, Richard Lovelace, Robert Herrick, Edmund Waller, Thomas Carew, William Wordsworth, Samuel Taylor Coleridge, Percy Bysshe Shelley, Lord Byron, and John Keats as some of the major factors in his choice of poesy.

== Philanthropy ==
Eastlandah created the Youth Hall of Fame to help in recognising youth enterprises and efforts. He has performed in poetry concerts to raise funds for both charities and the foundations he is a member of, and launched the Eastlandah Fund, as an endowment to help fund viable online start-ups with a promising future, run by young people. In 2009, Eastlandah initiated the "sanitary towels per term" project to help keep girls in schools, through provision of sanitary towels to at least last each individual a term, It is now an initiative under 'ICONS', another foundation by Eastlandah.

A women's rights activist, Eastlandah plans to launch V-MEN in Kenya to bring together men in the fight against what he terms, "Vaginal violence". His personal "need a hand-here" project will see the first group of bright but needy students graduate from high school.
