= Kenyan–Ugandan border conflict =

Border war in East Africa

Kenyan-Ugandan border war
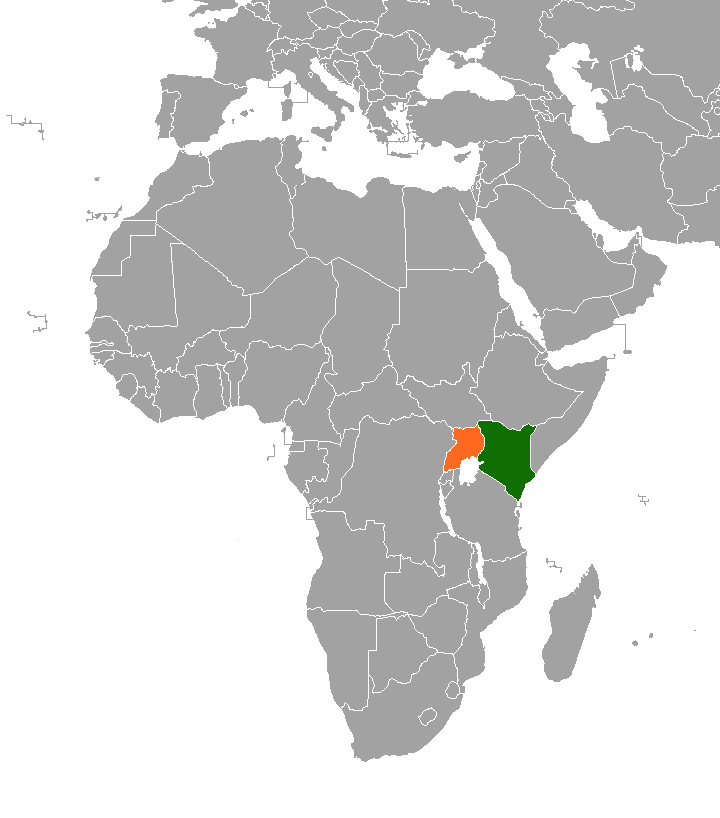
Date	October 1987 – August 1990
Location	Kenyan-Ugandan border
Result	Return to the status quo ante bellum: Kenya–Uganda relations strained

Belligerents
Kenya; NOM	Uganda; Mwakenya Movement

Commanders and leaders
Daniel arap Moi; Dan Opito; Milton Obote (alleged)	Yoweri Museveni; Ngũgĩ wa Thiong'o

The Kenyan–Ugandan border conflict was a series of military and political tensions between Kenya and Uganda from 1987 to 1990.

== Background ==
After the NRM had taken power in Uganda, relations with Kenya had worsened due to Kenyan President Moi's distrust of Museveni. He suspected that the left-leaning NRM might be supporting the Mwakenya Movement, a socialist Kenyan insurgent force. It was known that the NRM allowed Mwakenya fighters to travel freely through Uganda. Kenya consequently started to fund and arm UPA insurgents. In October 1987, tensions escalated into a firefight between the NRA and the Kenya Army at the border town of Busia. In response, Museveni publicly accused Kenya of supporting anti-NRM rebels. He deployed troops to the border, officially to stop guerrillas from crossing into Uganda; Moi responded by stating that any attempts by the NRA to violate the Kenyan border would be met with force. The Kenya Times, regarded as being close to Moi, accused the NRM of supporting Kenyan rebels, spying, kidnappings of Kenyans, and cattle rustling. On 15 December a Ugandan veteran “kadogo” smuggler who had been arrested by Kenya’s JSU managed to disarm a JSU and crossed with the gun to Uganda at the Soko Mjinga market (no man’s land market in Busia). This increased tensions that led to at least 26 NRA soldiers and over 100 Kenyan soldiers being killed during an incursion into Kenya, causing the tensions to almost escalate into open war. Although the situation was defused as a result of talks organized by Mengistu Haile Mariam of Ethiopia and Ali Hassan Mwinyi of Tanzania, tensions continued.

The "Ninth of October Movement" (NOM), led by Dan Opito, ermerged around 1988. In February 1989, NOM began launching attacks into eastern and northeastern Uganda from Kenyan soil. It clashed with the NRA at Usuku. The group was suspected of links to ex-President Milton Obote. In March 1989, the Ugandan air force bombed the Kenyan town of Lokichogio. Although war was once again avoided, relations between Uganda and Kenya were not normalized until a meeting between Moi and Museveni in August 1990.

== Sources ==
- Golooba-Mutebi, Frederick (January 2008). "Collapse, War and Reconstruction in Uganda. An analytical narrative on state-making" (PDF). Makerere University Crisis States Working Papers Series (2). ISSN 1749-1800.
- Lewis, Janet I. (2017). "How Does Ethnic Rebellion Start?" (PDF). Comparative Political Studies. 50 (10): 1420–1450. doi:10.1177/0010414016672235. S2CID 157893522.
