= James Murua =

Kenyan blogger & journalist

- Born: Nairobi, Kenya
- Known for: Blogger, journalist and media consultant
- Spouse: Zukiswa Wanner
- Website: www.writingafrica.com

James Murua is a Kenyan blogger, journalist and media consultant, who has written for a variety of media outlets. He is a former columnist for The Star newspaper in Kenya, leaving to become a full-time blogger.

In 2013, he founded a website – James Murua.com – that became the leading online platform covering the African literary scene. In 2023, the website was renamed to Writing Africa (writingafrica.com). Murua also established a YouTube channel as a space for African literature on the web.

== Biography ==
James Murua was born and raised in Nairobi, Kenya. He made his debut as a blogger in 2009 with a (now defunct) blog called Nairobiliving.com, and went on to work for The Star newspaper, serving for five years as editor and as a columnist for nine, being voted "Columnist of the Year" in 2009. He has also contributed to Management Magazine (Kenya), The Daily Nation (Kenya), The Nairobian (Kenya), DigifyAfrica.com (South Africa), Johannesburg Review of Books (South Africa), and Africa Independent (South Africa).

In 2013, he founded a website – James Murua.com – that became the leading online platform covering the African literary scene. In 2023, the website was renamed Writing Africa, and Murua explained: "The name change had been something that I had thought about for many years. The actual change was however forced on me as the company that I had outsourced the hosting component of my business had an internal falling out. With the owners abandoning the company, staffers set up a separate company and moved as many of their clients as they could to a new internet host. In that melee, I lost some of my websites including JamesMurua.com which lapsed in the interim to the move. Lucky for me, my company had already saved my content on a separate server and all I needed was register a new domain and start again." Murua also established a YouTube channel as a space for African literature on the web.

He has taken part in international book fairs and has conducted workshops on blogging and social media in Kenya, Uganda, Tanzania and Malawi. He has also been a media consultant for the Goethe Institut, Nairobi.

In 2020, Murua served as a judge for the Caine Prize for African Writing, and he was the founding chairman of the Kendeka Prize for African Writing, "the richest independent literary prize for fiction in East Africa".

== Personal life ==
Murua's wife is writer and editor Zukiswa Wanner.

== Selected articles ==
- "Dispatch from Conakry: James Murua attends the 2017 World Book Capital celebrations", Johannesburg Review of Books, 5 June 2017.
- "Remembering Binyavanga", The Elephant, 21 May 2020.
