= Iman Verjee =

Kenyan author

- Born: Nairobi, Kenya
- Occupation: Novelist
- Writing career
- Genre: Literary fiction
- Notable works: In Between Dreams; Who Will Catch Us As We Fall
- Notable awards: Peters Fraser & Dunlop/City University Prize for Fiction (2012)

Iman Verjee is a Kenyan author who has written two books and is currently based in Edmonton, Canada. Verjee was born in Nairobi, Kenya, and lived there until she was 18 before moving to Canada and England.

== Career ==
Verjee's first novel, In Between Dreams, addresses themes of child sexual abuse and was published in May 2014 by Oneworld Publications. Speaking to Kenyan newspaper Daily Nation in 2014, Verjee said she focused on the topic of sexual abuse because "it’s a terrible thing to have to happen to anyone and it’s imperative that society deals with it".

Her second novel, Who Will Catch Us As We Fall, was published in 2016. It examines the culture of the Indian-Kenyans who arrived in Kenya during the colonial era, focusing particularly on the tensions between Africans and Indians living in post–British imperialism Kenya. She began writing her second novel while she spent a year back in Kenya after twelve years away, after which time she observed how the city had changed in her absence.

== Bibliography ==
- In Between Dreams (2014)
- Who Will Catch Us as We Fall (2016)

== Awards and recognition ==
Verjee is the winner of the 2012 Peters Fraser & Dunlop/City University Prize for Fiction for her novel In Between Dreams.
