= Inoorero University =

University in Nairobi, Kenya

Coordinates: 1.269312°S 36.819878°E

International University of Professional Studies
- Former names: Inoorero University, Kenyan School of Professional Studies
- Established: 1983
- Chancellor: Francis Nyammo
- Location: Nairobi, Kenya
- Website: http://www.iu.ac.ke/

The International University of Professional Studies (IUPS), formerly known as Inoorero University (IU), was a university located in Nairobi in Kenya. It was formerly a middle-level college.
