= Wahome Mutahi =

Kenyan humourist (1954–2003)

Wahome Mutahi (24 October 1954 – 22 July 2003) was a humourist from Kenya. He was popularly known as Whispers after the name of the column he wrote for The Daily Nation from 1982 to 2003, offering a satirical view of the trials and tribulations of Kenyan life.

== Beginnings ==
Mutahi was equally well known in theatre where he wrote and acted in English- and Kikuyu-language plays that caricatured Kenya's society and politics using his company Igiza Productions. There is a memorial bust of him at the Kenya National Theatre. Outside of Kenya, he wrote humour columns for Ugandan publications The Monitor and Lugambo.

Among his books are Three Days on the Cross which won the Jomo Kenyatta Prize for Literature (1992), Jail Bugs, Doomsday, and How To Be a Kenyan, based on his newspaper columns. Others include The Miracle Merchants, Mr Canta, Hassan the Genie, The Ghost of Garba Tula and Just Wait and See.

== Arrest ==
In 1986 Mutahi was arrested with his brother Njuguna Mutahi and detained in the infamous Nyayo House torture chambers in Nairobi. He was charged with sedition and alleged association with the underground Mwakenya Movement and later transferred to Kamiti Maximum Security Prison. They were both released after fifteen months without ever being brought to trial. His imprisonment inspired him to write Three Days on the Cross and Jail bugs.

== Health ==
In early 2003 Mutahi underwent what was supposed to be a routine, minor and painless operation at the Thika District Hospital to remove a lipoma from his back. He had been assured by a surgeon friend, who had offered to do the operation, that the procedure would take less than 15 minutes. Possibly because of a blunder by the anaesthesiologist, he went into a coma from which he never awoke. His family was waiting for his condition to improve before they could fly him to London for corrective neurosurgery.

== Death ==
Mutahi died on 22 July 2003 at the Kenyatta National Hospital after 137 days in a coma. All his life he expressed his solidarity with the average Kenyan through his refrain: "I am neither too foolish nor too clever."

== Legacy ==
By the time Whispers died, he had grown into a formidable art form. In the mainstream press, both The Standard and The Nation have attempted to "reincarnate" Whispers through surrogate writers. Benson Riungu reintroduced "Benson's World", written along the lines of Whispers in the Sunday Standard after Mutahi's death. The Sunday Nation tried the "Whispers" column with a new writer but it never worked. However, the style of expression developed over the years by Mutahi in Whispers is still best expressed in politics through humour, satire and the use of certain widely diffused iconographic imagery. In 2009, the Sunday Nation introduced another humour column, Staffroom Diary, written by a Mwalimu Andrew — which is today widely regarded as the best humour writing in Kenya after Whispers. It is a humorous story about the experiences of Mwalimu Andrew, a Primary school teacher in rural Kenya. The teacher also studies at Kenyatta University which enables him to write on humour both in the village and in town. Mwalimu Andrew style is a little different from Whispers' in the sense that his anecdotes are stories that lead from one episode to another, all of them humorous. The column is very popular especially among teachers countrywide and is also published in Citizen newspaper, Tanzania. It is not yet known who writes Staffroom Diary, nor is it clear whether he is indeed a primary school teacher or a creative writer – but is seen as the best replacement of Whispers.

His family has started the Wahome Mutahi memorial trust to further his work especially humour and theatre. In addition, the Kenya Publishers Association started the bi-annual Wahome Mutahi award for literature, in his honour in 2005.

A book analysing Wahome Mutahi's works titled Wahome Mutahi's World was published and edited by Herve Maupeuand Patrick Mutahi.
