= Joseph Muthee =

Kenyan writer

Joseph Muthee (born 1928) is a Kenyan writer and Kikuyu sage who wrote about his experience as a detainee of the British colonial government at Kapenguria during the Mau Mau Uprising. He was released in 1959, and entered politics as the KANU Party Locational Branch Chairman of Magutu between 1960 and 1968. Poor finances eventually forced him to return to horticulture to support his family. He won the Jomo Kenyatta Prize for Literature in 2007 for Kizuizini.

== Works ==
- Joseph Muthee (December 2006). Kizuizini. Kwani Trust. ISBN 9966-9836-7-8.
- Joseph Muthee (2006-11-30). My Life in a British Concentration Camp. Jovian Books. ISBN 0-9773722-8-6.
- Mau Mau detainee|Author= Joseph Muthee
