= Wilfred Nderitu =

Wilfred Ngunjiri Nderitu is a former chair of the Governing Council of the Kenyan Section of the International Commission of Jurists (ICJ).

Wilfred holds a Master of Arts degree in International Relations from The Fletcher School of Law and Diplomacy, Tufts University, as well as a Certificate in Conflict Analysis from the United States Institute of Peace. He is also alumnus of the University of Nairobi, from where he graduated with an honours Bachelor of Laws (LL.B) degree in 1988. He later obtained a post-graduate Diploma in Law from the Kenya School of Law and was thereafter admitted to the Bar as an Advocate of the High Court of Kenya in 1989.

Between 2009 and 2010, Wilfred was a member of the Task Force on Judicial Reforms which, among other things, successfully made recommendations for the inclusion of constitutional provisions for the entrenchment of an independent Judiciary in Kenya in the country's 2010 Constitution. From November 2012 to October 2016, he was assigned by the International Criminal Court (ICC) as the common legal representative for victims in The Prosecutor -v- William Samoei Ruto and Joshua arap Sang. He also served with the United Nations International Criminal Tribunal for Rwanda (UNICTR) as lead counsel in The Prosecutor -v- Simon Bikindi (2002-2007), in The Prosecutor -v- Casimir Bizimungu et al. (2008-2009), as Co-Counsel in The Prosecutor -v- Grégoire Ndahimana (2010-2011), and as Amicus Curiae in The Prosecutor -v- Édouard Karemera et al., and again as Amicus Curiae in Re: Jean-Pierre Kajuga and in Re: Alexis Rukundo (2015). He also served as duty counsel with the International Criminal Court (ICC) in connection with ensuring the observance of the rights of a potential witness during investigations (Article 55 rights) in The Prosecutor -v- Joseph Kony, Vincent Otti, Raska Lukwiya, Okot Odhiambo and Dominic Ongwen (the LRA case), (2007), and as lead counsel in The Prosecutor -v- Jean de Dieu Ndagijimana at the United Nations International Residual Mechanism for Criminal Tribunals (UNMICT) in 2018.

Since 2015, Wilfred has been the convenor of the Law Society of Kenya's Criminal Justice Committee. In 2017, he was elected (and continues as) Vice-chairperson of the Committee on Criminal Justice Reforms of the National Council on the Administration of Justice (NCAJ), following his appointment as a Member of the committee by the chief justice of the Republic of Kenya. In 2019, he was appointed as a Member of the National Council on the Administration of Justice's (NCAJ) Committee Against Corruption, and also as chairperson of the Legal, Regulatory and Policy Committee of the Multisectoral Forum Against Corruption set up by the Kenya Private Sector Alliance (KEPSA) following the 1st National Anti-Corruption Conference held in January 2019. Since 2019, he is also a member of the Committee on Active Case Management in Criminal Cases, which brings together various stakeholders in the criminal justice sector.

Wilfred holds non-paid positions on various governance bodies, including Crime Si Poa (board chair), ActionAid International Kenya (Member of the General Assembly), Alliance Française de Nairobi (board member), Sarakasi Trust (Member of the board of trustees), and Muthithi Gardens Residents Society (Trustee).

In July 2020, Wilfred was conferred by the president of the Republic of Kenya with the rank of senior counsel, the highest rank conferred on members of the legal profession who have made a significant contribution to the legal profession and/or public life on account of their exceptional experience and outstanding ability. He currently resides in Nairobi, Kenya, where he is managing partner in the law firm of Nderitu & Partners, and a practicing arbitrator.
