= Nyayo House =

Coordinates: 1.2869°S 36.8181°E

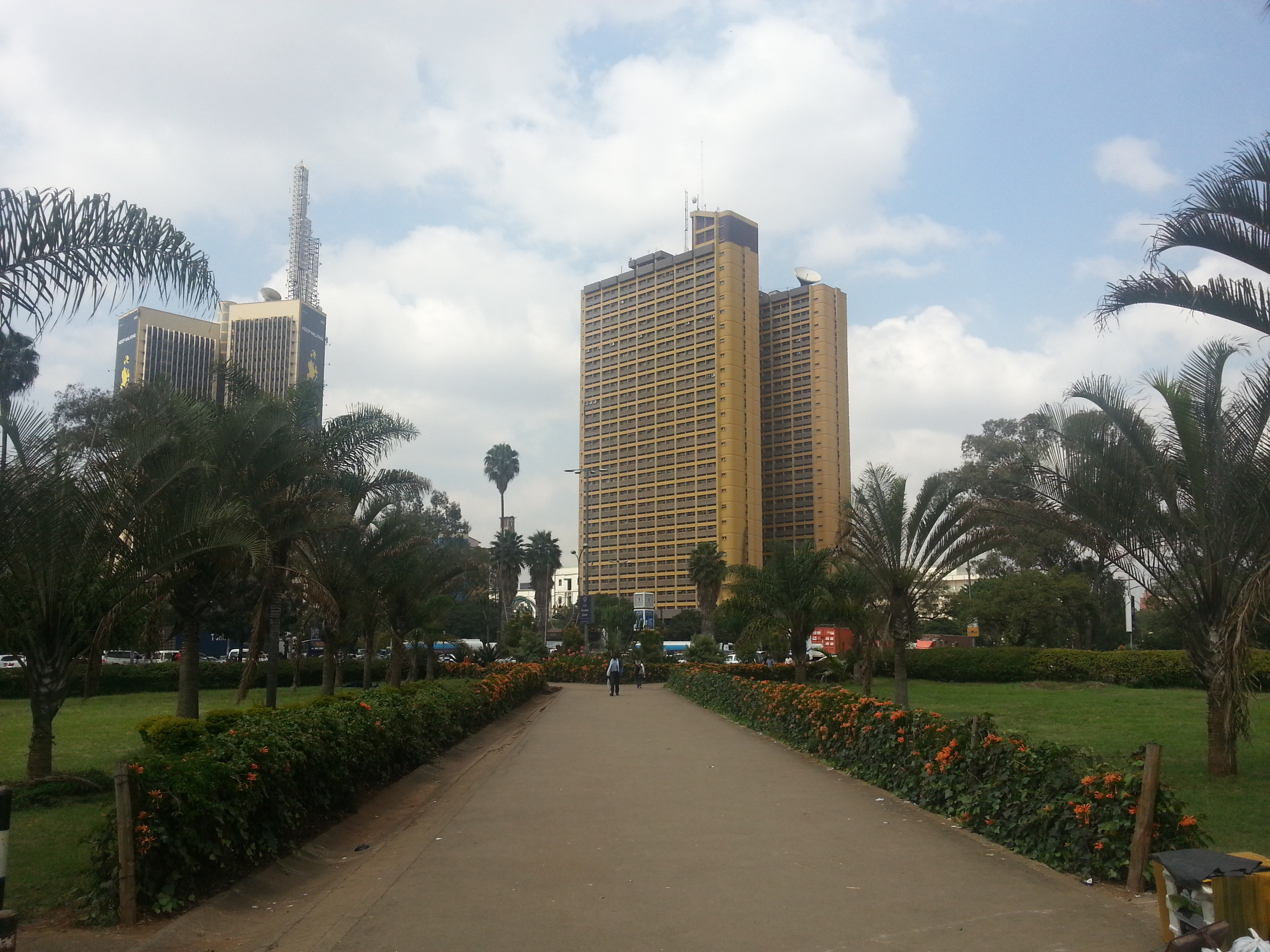
- Nyayo House, Nairobi
- Interactive map of the Nyayo House area

General information
- Type: Government Building
- Location: Nairobi, Kenya

Technical details
- Floor count: 27
- Lifts/elevators: 6

Design and construction
- Main contractor: Laxmanbhai Construction

Nyayo House is a skyscraper in Nairobi, Kenya. It hosts several government departments such as immigration (the State Department for Immigration, Border Control, and Regulation of Persons) and also serves as the headquarters of Nairobi Province. The building is located at the corner of Uhuru Highway and Kenyatta Avenue. It is 84 metres high and has 27 floors.

Planning of the tower started in 1973 and it was initially set to be named Nairobi House. Construction started in 1979, one year after Daniel arap Moi took over as the president of Kenya. Building of the house was completed in 1983. The building was planned by Ministry of Public Works, Ngotho Architects and constructed by Laxmanbhai Construction.

Nyayo House is particularly known for its detention facilities in its basement, often called "Nyayo House torture chambers". Many opponents of the Moi government were beaten there by Special Branch officials (the Special Branch was later renamed the National Security Intelligence Service). Some of the known detainees at Nyayo House were George Anyona, Wahome Mutahi and Raila Odinga

After the Moi era the Truth, Justice and Reconciliation Commission (TJRC) investigated Nyayo House torture cases, and several victims — including politician Koigi wa Wamwere — were compensated. Another detainee, musician Ochieng Kabaselleh died soon after he was released, allegedly due to injuries caused by torture. A court case was filed in June 2024 by some of the survivors of the torture chambers for them be made into a museum and open to the public.

Nyayo House is also infamous for its association with state corruption.

== Gallery ==
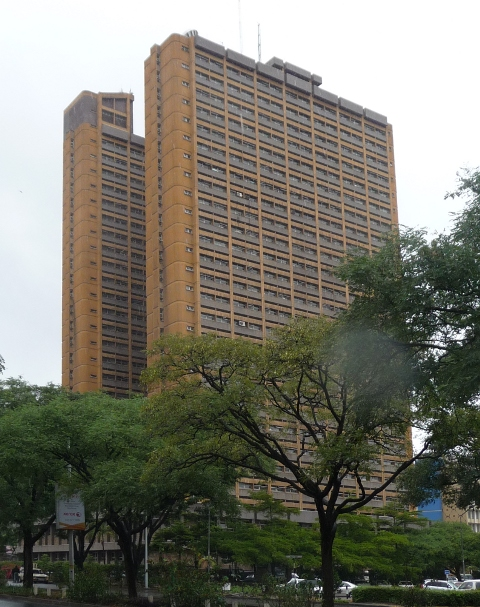
