= Utendi wa Tambuka =

Epic poem in the Swahili language, dated 1728

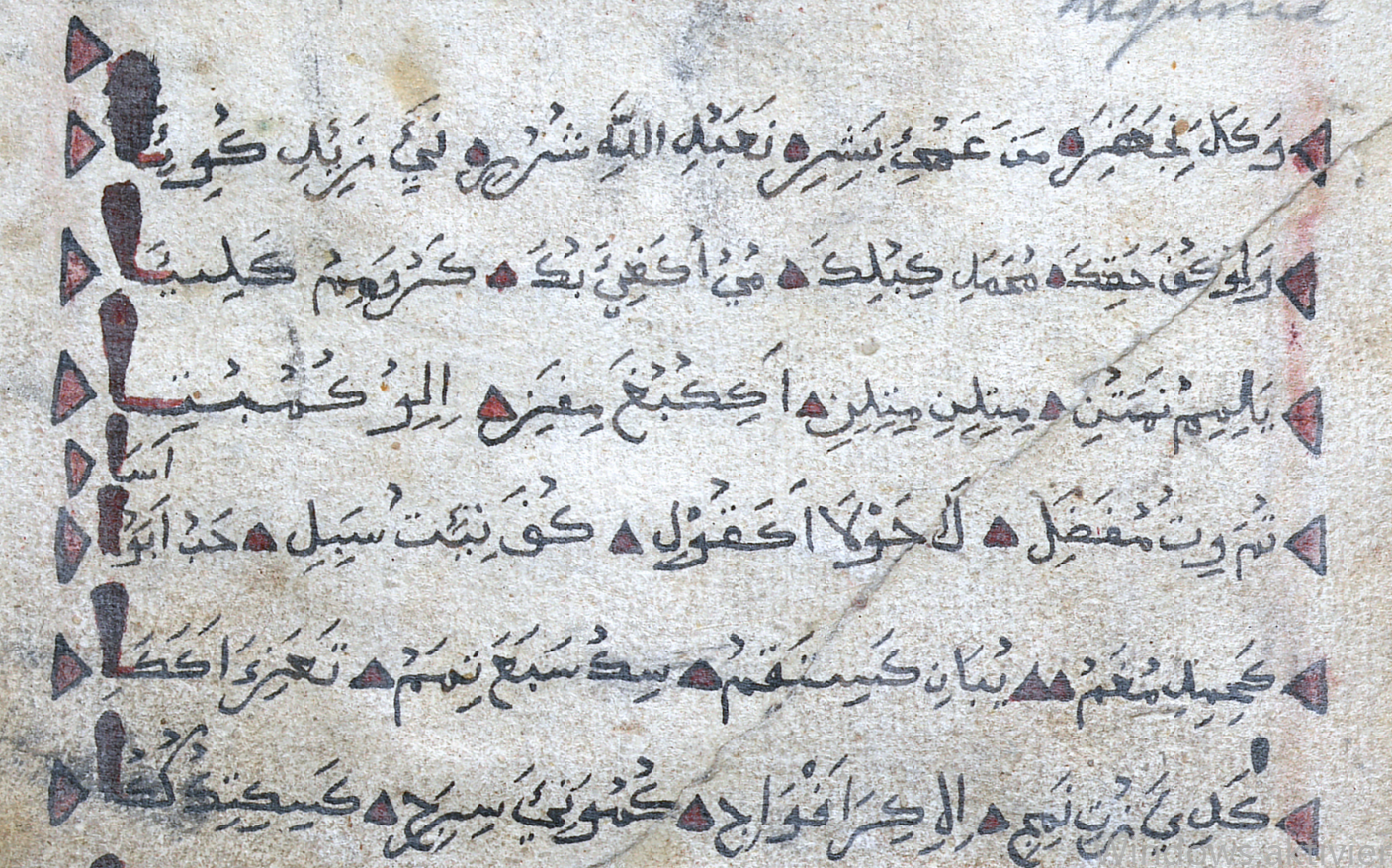
The first lines of Utendi wa Tambuka (Utenzi wa Hirqal) in a 19th-century manuscript from SOAS collection

Utend̠i wa Tambuka, also known as Utenzi wa Tambuka (Note: The symbol d̠ is a transliteration of the Arabic for the Swahili sound dh ([ð]). Often this sound is written simply z, hence the different spellings.) ("The Story of Tambuka"), Utenzi wa Hirqal or Kyuo kya Hereḳali (the book of Heraclius), is an epic poem in the Swahili language by Bwana Mwengo wa Athman, dated 1728. It is one of the earliest known documents in Swahili.

== Depiction of the Byzantine Empire's wars ==
Known by various titles in English, including The Book of the Battle of Tambuka and The Story of Heraclius, the story recounts numerous events of the Arab–Byzantine and Byzantine-Ottoman wars between the Muslims and Romans (the contemporary name for the Byzantines). The Byzantines were represented by the Emperor of the Byzantine Empire, Heraclius. The story covers a period from 628 (the Battle of Mu'tah) to 1453 (the Fall of Constantinople). "Tambuka" is the Swahili rendering of Tabuk, a city now located in northwestern Saudi Arabia.

== Dating ==
The oldest manuscript of the epic is dated 1141 Anno Hegirae, corresponding to 1728 CE. It was written at Yunga, a royal palace in the old city of Pate (the palace has since been destroyed). In strophe 1124–1125, the author notes that the "king of Yung"' (that is, the then Sultan of Pate) asked him to write an epic on the heroic deeds of the first followers of the Islamic prophet Muhammad. The author identifies himself in one of the final stanzas (1146) as Mwengo, son of Athumani (Uthman). Not much more is known about him other than that he wrote at the court of the Sultan of Pate, that he was no longer a young man by 1728, and that some other poems are ascribed to him. He also had a son, Abu Bakr bin Mwengo, who wrote an imitation of his father's epic somewhere in the middle of the 18th century.

Like other manuscripts of the period in Swahili, the Utendi wa Tambuka is written in Arabic script. The language used is a northern dialect of Swahili called Kiamu; some manuscripts, however, show influence from another northern dialect, Kigunya, while others show traces of Kiunguja, the dialect of Zanzibar.

== Form ==
The Utendi wa Tambuka is a prime example of the Swahili poetic form of utenzi. Utenzi verse form consists of four-line stanzas, with each line having eight syllables. The last syllables of the first three lines rhyme with each other, while the fourth line has a rhyme that is constant throughout the whole of the epic. This last rhyme thus serves to tie all stanzas of the epic together. Most Swahili words have penultimate stress, resulting in every line having at least penultimate stress. Within a line of eight syllables there are no further meter requirements. The verse form can be illustrated by the first stanza of the poem: (Note: In Jan Knappert's Latin transcription, based on the Arabic manuscript U.)

Bisimillahi kut̠ubu
yina la Mola Wahhabu
Arraḥamani eribu
na Arraḥimu ukyowa

The first three lines all end in -bu. The last syllable of the fourth line ends in the vowel a, and this sound is found at the end of every stanza of the poem. When recited, this last syllable is sustained for some time and given emphasis.

== Content ==
The plot depicts a religious war between the Byzantines and the Muslims. Muhammad sends a letter to East Roman/Byzantine Heraclius, in which he tells him that the Byzantine belief that Jesus is the son of God is incorrect. Heraclius declares his intent to persevere in his adherence to Christianity on the grounds that the Byzantines have inherited their belief from their ancestors. The Muslims attack and, after epic struggles, eventually defeat the Byzantines. Heraclius' minister and his associates are captured and once again given the choice to accept Islam or die; they refuse to be converted and are executed.

The central figure of the poem, and the most heroic one, is Ali, a full nephew on the father's side of Muhammad. He is nicknamed Haydar, the lion, and in the course of the poem many other praise names are applied to him. Ali was married to the noble daughter of Muhammad, Fatima.

The second hero in order of magnitude is Umar.

== See also ==
- Swahili literature
