= John Rugoiyo Gichuki =

Kenyan teacher and columnist

- Citizenship: Kenyan
- Occupations: Teacher; columnist; playwright
- Known for: BBC African Playwriting competition wins
- Notable work: A Time for Cleansing (2004)
- Awards: BBC African Performance (2004); BBC African Playwriting competition (2006)

John Rugoiyo Gichuki is a teacher and columnist in Kenya. He won the BBC's African Playwriting competition for 2006 with his play Eternal, Forever, and the BBC's African Performance playwriting competition in 2004 with his play A Time for Cleansing, a play about incest and refugees in Rwanda.
