= Chacha Nyaigotti-Chacha =

Kenyan playwright and educationalist

Professor Chacha Nyaigotti Chacha (born 22 August 1952 in Kuria District, Nyanza Province, Kenya) is a Kenyan playwright and educationalist. He was an executive secretary of the Inter-University Council for East Africa (2000–2010), and the first CEO of the Kenyan Higher Education Loans Board (1995–2000). He is the chairman of the Kenyan Commission for University Education (CUE).

He was educated at Kenyatta College, receiving a BEd (Honours) (Swahili Language), and later studied at Yale University, gaining an MA in Anthropological Linguistics and a Ph.D. in Swahili Language Linguistics. He has been a Tutorial Fellow and Lecturer in Swahili Language and Linguistics at Kenyatta University and later Egerton University in Kenya. He was a Research Professor at the Institute of Regional Integration and Development of the Catholic University of East Africa.

== Merits ==
2004 Awarded the Order of the Grand Warrior (OGW) Medal (Kenya).

1994 Awarded Head of State Commendation (HSC) Medal (Kenya) for Distinguished Service.

== Bibliography ==
- Ushairi wa Abdilatif Abdalla: Sautiya Utetezi, Nyaigotti-Chacha, C., Dar es Salaam University Press (DUP), 1992. (Protest Theme in Swahili Poetry).
- Traditional Medicine in Africa, Edited by Sindiga, Isaac, Nyaigotti-Chacha, C. and Kanunah, M. P., East African Educational Publishers, 1995. ISBN 9966-46-548-0
- Mke Mwenza, Nyaigotti-Chacha, C., East Africa Education Publishers, 1997, (A Swahili storybook)
- Wingu Jeusi, Nyaigotti-Chacha, C., 1987, ISBN 9966-46-318-6
- Hukumu, Nyaigotti-Chacha, C., Longman Kenya, 1992, ISBN 9966-49-742-0 / ISBN 9966-49-742-0
- Marejeo, Kenya Lit. Bureau, 1986

== Other works ==
- The position of Kiswahili in Kenya, Nyaigotti-Chacha, C., University of Nairobi, Institute of African Studies, 1981
- African Universities in the Twenty-first Century, Edited by Paul Tiyambe Zeleza Adebayo Olukoshi, Chapter 5: Public Universities, Private Funding: The Challenges in East Africa, Nyaigotti-Chacha, C., 2005
- REFORMING HIGHER EDUCATION IN KENYA CHALLENGES, LESSONS AND OPPORTUNITIES, Nyaigotti-Chacha, C., Kenya August 2004
