= Abdilatif Abdalla =

Kenyan writer and political activist

Abdilatif Abdalla (born 1946 in Mombasa) is a Kenyan writer and political activist. He was imprisoned for his support of the Kenya People's Union, and began writing poetry in solitary confinement. A collection of poems from this time were published as a book titled Sauti ya Dhiki (Note: "Voice of Agony") (1973), which was awarded the Jomo Kenyatta Prize for Literature. He is the Chair of the Safal Kiswahili Prize for African Literature.

== Early life ==
Abdilatif Abdalla was born in Mombasa, Kenya, in 1946, where he was brought up by his grandfather Ahmad Basheikh bin Hussein. Abdalla attended school in Faza, before undertaking further studies at the British Tutorial College. He began his political involvement after working for the Mombasa City Council as an assistant accountant, writing the pamphlet Kenya Twendapi? (Eng: Kenya, Where Are We Headed) in support of the Kenya People's Union in 1968.

== Political imprisonment and writing ==
When the Kenyan Government of Jomo Kenyatta conducted a crackdown on KPU activists, Abdalla was imprisoned for conspiracy between 1969 and 1972. He was at first held in Kamiti Prison, and later in Shimo la Tewa Prison, where he was kept in solitary confinement. It was while imprisoned that he wrote the poems that would be collected in the 1973 work Sauti ya Dhiki, whose title translates to "Voice of Agony". These were written in the Mombasa version of the Swahili language and published by his older brother Sheikh Abdilahi Nassir. He later explained that writing the poems in solitary confinement had kept him sane.

After he was awarded the Jomo Kenyatta Prize for Literature for Sauti ya Dhiki in 1974, he moved in exile to Tanzania. While there he worked as a senior researcher on Swahili at the University of Dar es Salaam and collaborated editing a Swahili dictionary. In 1979, he moved to London and worked for BBC Swahili department, later editing the news magazine Africa Events. Abdalla's only English language poem was published in 1988, entitled Peace, Love and Unity for Whom?. This was in response to an attempt by Daniel arap Moi's government to bribe Abdalla into no longer working with Ngũgĩ wa Thiong'o. Abdalla has since taught Swahili at Leipzig University.

== Works ==
- Utenzi wa maisha ya Adamu na Hawaa (1971)
- Sauti ya Dhiki (1973)
