= Muthoni Likimani =

Kenyan writer (born 1926)

Mūthoni Likimani
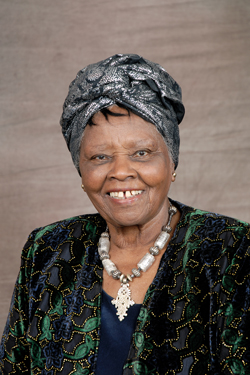
- Born: Mūthoni Gacanja; 1926 (age 99–100); Murang'a District, Kenya
- Occupations: Writer, broadcaster
- Notable work: Passbook Number F. 47927: Women and Mau Mau in Kenya (1985)
- Spouse: Dr Jason Clement Likimani (deceased)

Mūthoni Gacanja Likimani (born 1926) is a Kenyan activist and writer, who has published works of both fiction and non-fiction, as well as children's books. In her career she has also been a broadcaster, actress, teacher and publisher. She was the first Kenyan beauty queen, the first African to establish a public relations firm in Kenya and one of the country's earliest female authors. She was also one of the first female producers of the Kenya Broadcasting Corporation (KBC).

== Biography ==
Mūthoni Likimani was born and raised in Kahuhia Mission, Mūrang'a District, Kenya, the daughter of Mariuma Wanjiūra and Rev. Levi Gacanja Her father was one of the first Kenyan Anglican church ministers. She taught at Kahuhia Teachers’ Training College, before undertaking further studies in Britain and Israel, becoming involved in broadcasting and public relations. She went on to become one of the first women producers at the Kenya Broadcasting Corporation, working on women's and children's programmes, and was a freelance broadcaster for the BBC. She founded Noni's Publicity, a public relations company that also undertook publishing, including producing the periodical Women of Kenya.

Her first novel, They Shall Be Chastised, was published in 1974, followed by What Does a Man Want? in the same year. In 1985 her third and most important book appeared, Passbook Number F. 47927: Women and Mau Mau in Kenya, its title a reference to her identity number during the Mau Mau struggle. It is a fictional work that dramatizes the roles women played and the strategies they adopted in their daily lives during the fight for freedom.

In the 1980s, Likimani became a Nairobi city councillor, which position she held until the Kenyan government replaced the council with a city commission. Her autobiography, Fighting Without Ceasing, was published in 2005.

In 2007, she received the World YWCA Council Award in recognition of dedicated leadership for her involvement as a Women's Rights Activist. In 2014, she was appointed Peace Ambassador in Kenya of the International Forum for the Literature and Culture of Peace (IFLAC).

== Personal life ==
A Kikuyu, she married the Masai Dr Jason Clement Likimani, whom she met when he was the Medical Officer of Health at Fort Hall (now Murang'a) District General Hospital. She has said: "He had been with my brother, Ngumba, at Makerere University College and he used to come home. He was the only African medical practitioner allowed access to detention camps to treat detainees. And during our visits I was not allowed inside the camps. I would converse across the barbed wire and would sneak in and out letters to detainees’ relatives. That is how I became an unofficial letter carrier even though my husband did not know." They had four children. Her husband died in 1989.

== Selected works ==
- They Shall Be Chastised. Nairobi: East African Literature Bureau, 1974. Kenya Literature Bureau, 1991, ISBN 978-9966440945.
- What Does a Man Want? Nairobi: Kenya Literature Bureau, 1974. Noni's Publicity, 2001, ISBN 978-9966441201
- Passbook Number F. 47927: Women and Mau Mau in Kenya. Basingstoke and London: Palgrave Macmillan, 1985, ISBN 978-0333379455. Noni's Publicity, 2001, ISBN 978-9966967206.
- Women of Kenya: In the Decade of Development. Nairobi: Noni's Publicity, 1985.
- Fighting Without Ceasing, Nairobi: Noni's Publicity, 2005, ISBN 978-9966967268.
