= Jan Knappert =

Dutch linguist (1927–2005)

Jan Knappert (January 14, 1927, Heemstede – May 30, 2005, Hilversum, Netherlands) was a well-known expert on the Swahili language. He was also an Esperantist, and he wrote an Esperanto-Swahili dictionary.

== Life and career ==
Knappert translated many literary and historical works from Swahili; including Utendi wa Tambuka ("The Epic of Heraklios"), a very early Swahili epic poem. He also translated the Finnish national epic, The Kalevala, into Swahili.

Knappert taught in Leuven and London, as well as several African universities. He also participated in several Esperanto conventions in the 1970s, such as TEJO.

Knappert was Lecturer of Bantu Languages at the School of Oriental and African Studies (SOAS), specializing in Swahili traditional and religious literature. He wrote extensively about the manuscripts he collected and deposited in the SOAS Archives. His most important contributions include Four Centuries of Swahili Verses (1979), Swahili Islamic Poetry (1971), Epic Poetry in Swahili and other African Languages, (1983), A Survey of Swahili Islamic Epic Sagas (1999). He also resided at the University of Dar es Salaam, where he became Secretary of the East African Swahili Committee as well as editor of the journal of the same committee, after the death of W. H. Whiteley, in the 1970s. At SOAS, he worked with the great Africanists Malcolm Guthrie, A. N. Tucker, B. W. Andrzejewski, Gordon Innes, and Ronald Snoxall. In addition to the study of Swahili, Dr Knappert also holds a degree in Sanskrit with Indian history, Hinduism and Buddhism, a degree in Semitic languages with Hebrew, Arabic and Islam, and a Master in Austronesian studies, with Malay, Tagalog, Hawaiian and Malagasy. After teaching at SOAS for a number of years, he moved to Belgium to lecture. After this he retired from the University of Louvain, Belgium, to devote himself entirely to writing.

He fathered seven children and was grandfather to eight.

== Partial bibliography ==
- 1958: Het Epos Van Heraklios (Dutch edition and literal translation; dissertation at Leiden University)
- 1969: "The Utenzi wa Katirifu or Ghazwa ya Sesebani", Afrika und Übersee, Band LII, 3–4, 81–104.
- 1970: Myths and Legends of the Swahili. London: Heinemann.
- 1977: het Epos van Heraklios. Uit het Swahili vertaald in het oorspronkelijke metrum. Amsterdam: Meulenhoff (Dutch translation in the original meter).
- 1977: Myths and Legends of Indonesia. Singapore: Heinemann Educational Books (Asia) Ltd.
- 1986: Kings, Gods and Spirits from African Mythology. London: Eurobook Ltd.
- 1989: The A-Z of African Proverbs London: Karnak House.
- 1990: African Mythology. London: The Aquarian Press.
- 1991: Indian Mythology; an Encyclopedia of Myth and Legend. London: HarperCollins.
- 1995: Pacific Mythology; an Encyclopedia of Myth and Legend. London: HarperCollins.
- 2001: The Book of African Fables. New York: Edwin Mellen Press.
- 2003: The A-Z of African Love Songs. London: Karnak House.
- 2005: Swahili Culture Book I and II. New York: Edwin Mellen Press.
