= Rebecca Nandwa =

Kenyan writer

- Education: Kenyatta University, B.Ed.
- Writing career
- Language: Swahili
- Genre: Children's literature
- Notable awards: Jomo Kenyatta Prize; 2015 Nimefufuka

Rebecca Nandwa is a Kenyan writer who is best known for her children's books written in Swahili. She has been involved in a wide range of journalism and editorial work and used to be a teacher.

== Biography ==
After going to primary school in Western Kenya and secondary school in Limuru, she graduated from Kenyatta University with a B.Ed. Her first teaching post was at Emusire High School in 1988. She soon moved to Nairobi because she wanted to be closer to the country's publishers.

Nandwa likes writing in Swahili for children and, in this way, hopes to support traditional culture and language. She is motivated to deal with “social issues” in her stories. Chura Mcheza Ngoma, her first book, teaches the value of trusting friends, while Kiki and the Piggy Bank is about saving. Nandwa is a founder member of Angaza Writers, a group concerned with promoting integrity and good citizenship through writing. She also belongs to the National Culture and Creative Writers Association of Kenya: a “think tank that promotes local heritage and culture through writing”.

In 2013, she won a Jomo Kenyatta award in the Kiswahili Children's Category for her book Nimefufuka, and was also a nominee in 2015. She has written more than 35 books for a variety of publishers, including a few in English. Her books are recommended by the Kenyan Institute of Curriculum Development for use in educational institutions. Chura Mcheza Ngoma has featured in an International Board on Books for Young People (IBBY) online exhibition. Some of Nandwa's books are included in the Worldreader programme and her Pole Mzee Bonga was one of their “top books” for East Africa in 2014.
