= Alexander Nderitu =

Kenyan writer

Alexander Nderitu (born 23 April 1979) is a Kenyan novelist, scriptwriter and Internet technologist. He has also expressed interest in fashion design, music production, and filmed entertainment. He is a signatory to the PEN Charter.

== Biography ==
Nderitu was born Alex N. Nderitu in Nyeri, Kenya. A voracious reader of books from a young age, he always aspired to be a career writer.

Coming to Nairobi in 2001, he worked as a movie reviewer and later as an Internet technologist. Having a background in IT, he explored internet options for literature. In November 2002, he became Africa's first digital novelist with the internet publication of his debut novel, When the Whirlwind Passes. Initially a free download on his website, it remains Africa's most-downloaded novel. In 2004, he was nominated for the Douglas Coupland Short Story Award for his tragic spy story, "Life as a Flower". In late 2007, Nderitu won a Theatre Company prize for his humorous stage play, Hannah and the Angel. The play, performed an actors' group called "Fire By Ten," debuted at the Phoenix Theatre in Nairobi on Sunday 11 November 2007.

Nderitu has posted numerous poems on the Internet, some of which have also appeared in local (Kenyan) newspapers and in a VoicesNet poetry anthology.

His other works include The Patriots Club, a thriller about arms smuggling; and What's Wrong With This Picture?, a stage play about the Hollywood film-making industry.

In 2024, Alexander Nderitu under the African Griot, launched the Alexander Nderitu prize that ran from 1st May -31st May and was aimed at appreciating writers and literary workers through submissions of short creative pieces limited to 3000 words.
