= Carolyne Adalla =

Kenyan writer

- Citizenship: Kenya
- Occupations: Novelist; Writer

Carolyne Adalla is a Kenyan writer, author of Confessions of an AIDS victim (1993).

Carolyne Adalla was born in Kenya. Confessions of an AIDS victim is a short epistolatory novel. The protagonist Catherine Njeri discovers that she has AIDS and cannot continue with her plans to study in the United States.

== Works ==
- Confessions of an AIDS victim. Nairobi: East Africa Educational Publishers, 1993.
