= Margaret Ogola =

Kenyan author

Margaret Atieno Ogola
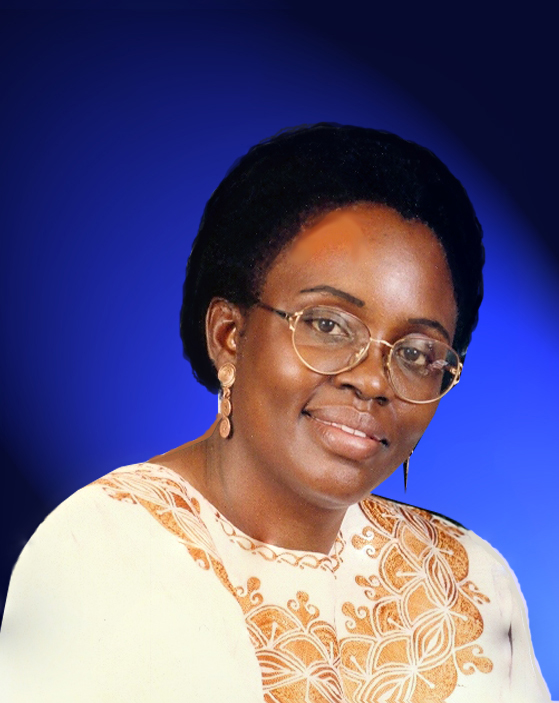
- Ogola circa 1998
- Born: Margaret Atieno Odongo; 12 June 1958; Asembo, British East Africa
- Died: 21 September 2011 (aged 53); Nairobi, Kenya
- Education: Catholic University of Eastern Africa (PgDip in Planning and Management of Development Projects, 2004); University of Nairobi (MMed in Paediatrics, 1990); University of Nairobi (MBChB, 1984); Alliance Girls' High School
- Occupations: author; paediatrician; health administrator; human rights activist
- Known for: The River and the Source
- Children: 6
- Awards: Familias Award for Humanitarian Service; Commonwealth Writers' Prize

Margaret Atieno Ogola (12 June 1958 – 21 September 2011) was a Kenyan Catholic novelist who wrote The River and the Source and its sequel, I Swear by Apollo.

The River and the Source follows four generations of Kenyan women in a rapidly changing country and society. The book has been on the KCSE syllabus for many years, and it won the 1995 Commonwealth Writers' Prize for best first book, Africa Region. Ogola completed her final novel, Mandate of the People, shortly before her death. It was published posthumously in 2012. She was also the recipient of the Familias Award for Humanitarian Service of the World Congress of Families.

In addition to her writing career, Ogola served as a paediatrician and the medical director of Cottolengo Hospice, a hospice for HIV and AIDS orphans.

== Life and studies ==
She studied at Thompson's Falls High School and was best student overall in school. She also studied at Alliance Girls High School. At the University of Nairobi she earned her first degree, Bachelor of Medicine & Surgery, in 1984.

After graduation, she worked as a medical officer at Kenyatta National Hospital. In 1990, she earned her Master of Medicine in Paediatrics at the University of Nairobi. She also took a Post Graduate Diploma on Planning & Management of Development Projects at the Catholic University of Eastern Africa in 2004. She was an advisor to the Kenyan Catholic bishops on issues of family and health, and a member of Opus Dei.

She received chemotherapy for cancer. Margaret Ogola was married to Dr. George Ogola, with whom she had six children: four biological and two adopted, including Paulette Ogola, Vivian Ogola, and David Ogola, a musician popularly known as "David Major" who appeared on Tusker Project Fame.

== Work ==
Ogola was a paediatrician based in Nairobi and the medical director of Cottolengo Hospice, a hospice for HIV and AIDS orphans. She was also vice-president of Family Life Counselling (Kenya) and interested in women's empowerment.

She was National Executive Secretary of the Commission for Health & Family Life of the Kenya Episcopal Conference(1998–2002).

From 2002 to 2004, she was the Country Coordinator of the "Hope for African Children Initiative", a partnership of several international NGOs that included Plan, CARE, Save the Children, Society for Women and AIDS, World Conference For Religion and Peace and World Vision. The Initiative's main goal is to strengthen the capacity of African communities, to advocate, care for and support children impacted by HIV/AIDS & prevent further spread of HIV.

She also helped found and manage the SOS HIV/AIDS Clinic (April 2004–April 2005), which is a clinic for PLWAs. The clinic offers VCT, baseline investigations including CD4s, treatment of OI, provision of ART and nutritional support to 1000 persons from the surrounding slums: women, men and children.

Also she was the National Executive Secretary: KEC-CS: Commission for Health & Family Life. She is once again Head the Commission of the Catholic Secretariat. The commission is charged with Coordination of 500 Catholic Health Units & Community Outreaches all over Kenya providing services to over 5 million cases annually.

Ogola was appointed a member of the National Council for Children Services. In 1999, she also was the recipient of the Familias Award for Humanitarian Service of the World Congress of Families in Geneva, Switzerland.

== Writings ==
She wrote three novels, a biography and a handbook for parents.

- The River and the Source, a novel which is a set book used in Kenya schools and has won the Jomo Kenyatta Prize for Literature in 1995 and the 1995 Commonwealth Writers' Prize for Best First Book in Africa. It has been translated into Italian, Lithuanian and Spanish. The book describes the changing lives of 4 generations of Kenyan women.
- I Swear by Apollo, a novel which examines issues of medical ethics and the question of authentic identity
- A Biography: A Gift of Grace, examines the life of the first Catholic bishop, archbishop and cardinal in Kenya, Cardinal Maurice Michael Otunga (1923–2003).
- Educating in Human Love, a book guiding children on sex, a handbook for parents
- Place of Destiny, a novel about a woman dying of cancer and the rise to recognition of a former street child as well as issues of poverty. Won the Jomo Kenyatta Prize for Literature.

Of her first novel, Ogola says:

"The inspiration for this book came from my mother who handed down to me the wisdom and lives of her own mother and grandmother. This strength and support that is found in the African family is the most important part of our culture, and should be preserved and nurtured at all costs."

In an analysis of The River and the Source, Tom Odhiambo writes:

The several female protagonists in the text, representing different historical periods in Kenya's history, symbolically articulate a kind of womanhood in contemporary Kenya that projects its own social agency and identity. In the process, these characters rewrite the persona that has been allocated to women in postcolonial Kenya's national story." Odhiambo contends that "Ogola's text seeks to project Kenyan women as capable of not only telling their own stories but also of claiming their rightful place and identity in the broader national life.

== Quotation ==
"Unless we recognise that each individual is irrepeatable and valuable by virtue of simply being conceived human, we cannot begin to talk about human rights. This includes the right to be born, as all of us have enjoyed. True justice should be for each human being, visible and invisible, young and old, disabled and able, to enjoy fully their right to life. The accidental attributes that we acquire such as colour, sex intelligence, economic circumstances, physical or mental disability should not be used as an excuse to deprive a person of life."

Quoted from a speech she gave: "On the Dignity of the African Woman"

== Bibliography ==
- The River and the Source (1994) ISBN 9966-882-05-7
- Cardinal Otunga: A Gift of Grace with Margaret Roche (1999) ISBN 9966-21-426-7
- I Swear by Apollo (2002) ISBN 9966-882-72-3
- Place of Destiny (2005) ISBN 9966-08-062-7
- Mandate of the people (2012) ISBN 9966-011773
- Narrator or "presenter" for The odds against us – but there’s hope (VHS videocassette) Nairobi: Ukweli Video Productions, c2002.

== Tribute ==
On 12 June 2019, on Ogola's 60th birthday, she was honored with a Google Doodle.

== See also ==
- Ngũgĩ wa Thiong'o – Kenyan writer and academic (1938–2025)
- Francis Imbuga – Kenyan playwright (1947–2012)
- Henry Ole Kulet
- Kithaka wa Mberia
