= Hazel de Silva Mugot =

Seychelloise/Kenyan writer

- Born: 1947
- Died: January 1996 (aged 48–49); Seychelles
- Citizenship: Kenya; Seychelles
- Occupations: Writer; model; academic; artist
- Employer: University of Nairobi
- Known for: First Seychellois woman to publish fiction and poetry
- Notable work: Black night of Quiloa (1971)

Hazel de Silva Mugot (born 1947) is a Seychelloise Kenyan writer.

== Biography ==
The daughter of a Sri Lankan accountant and a teacher from the Seychelles, she was educated in Kenya, the United States and the UK. After her return to Kenya, she worked as a professional model and taught social work at the University of Nairobi. Hazel moved to the Seychelles islands, her maternal home, where she lived with her family until she passed in January 1996. In those years, she worked briefly in the media as a producer, but opted to follow her creative passions and flourished as a well-respected cultural fiction and poetry writer, batik artist and ceramics dabbler. Her passion for the culture and people of Seychelles was reflected in her art and prose and she was a patron of the arts of sorts, being the first Seychellois woman on record to have published fiction and poetry. She would frequently exhibit her art pieces and mentored many young Seychellois artists who are prominent in their own right today.

== Selected work ==
- Black night of Quiloa, novel (1971)
- Sega of Seychelles, novel (1983)
