= Francis D. Imbuga =

Kenyan playwright (1947–2012)

Francis Davis Imbuga
- Born: Francis Davis Imbuga; February 2, 1947; Wenyange Village, Chavakali, West Maragoli, Western Province, Kenya
- Died: November 18, 2012 (aged 65); Nairobi, Kenya
- Education: University of Nairobi (BA); University of Iowa (Ph.D.)
- Spouse: Mabel Imbuga
- Children: 5

Francis Davis Imbuga (1947–2012) was born in Wenyange village, West Maragoli in Western Kenya in 1947. He was a Kenyan writer, playwright, literature scholar, teacher and professor at Kenyatta University. His works, including Aminata^{[1]} and Betrayal in the City,^{[2]} have become staples in the study of literature schools in Kenya.

His works have consistently dealt with issues such as the clashes of modernity and tradition in the social organisation of African communities. His play Betrayal in the City was Kenya's entry to FESTAC.

== Education ==
He attended Keveye Primary school and Chavakali Intermediate School. In 1963 he joined Alliance High School. Imbuga studied at the University of Nairobi where he received a Bachelor of Arts degree in 1973 and a Master of Arts degree in 1975. In 1992, he received a Doctor of Philosophy degree from the University of Iowa.

== Career ==
Imbuga started his career as an actor at Kenya Broadcasting Corporation in 1970. He left this post in 1973 and in 1976 he became a lecturer in the Department of Educational Communication and Technology at the University of Nairobi. He later joined Kenyatta University as professor of literature, holding the posts of Dean of the Literature Department, Dean of Arts and Director of Quality Assurance. Imbuga was an honorary Fellow of the University of Iowa International Writing Programme.

Imbuga started writing plays in 1969. His play Omolo was chosen as an entry in the Kenya National School's Drama Festival finals.

Imbuga died on the night of Sunday November 18, 2012, after suffering a stroke.

== Membership ==
He was a member of the Kenya National Theatre and the International Writing Program.

== Works ==
- The Fourth Trial (1972)
- Kisses of Fate (1972)
- The Married Bachelor (1973)
- Betrayal in the City (1976)
- Games of Silence (1977)
- The Successor (1979)
- Man of Kafira (1984)
- Aminata (1988)
- The Burning of the Rags (1989)
- Shrine of Tears (1992)
- Miracle of Remera (2004)
- The Green Cross Of Kafira (2013)
