= Maina wa Kinyatti =

Kenyan Marxist historian and former political prisoner

Maina wa Kinyatti is a Kenyan Marxist historian and former political prisoner under Daniel arap Moi's dictatorship. He is considered the foremost researcher on the Mau Mau in Kenya, one of the primary reasons that Kinyatti was arrested and imprisoned. After being released from prison on 17 October 1988 (after serving six and a half years, mostly in solitary confinement), he fled the country to Tanzania, fearing a re-arrest by Moi's government. After a month in Dar es Salaam, Kinyatti was forced to apply for political asylum in the US. Kinyatti was awarded the PEN Freedom to Write Award in 1988.

== Bibliography ==
- Thunder from the Mountains: Poems and Songs from the Mau Mau
- Mau Mau: A Revolution Betrayed
- Kenya's Freedom Struggle: The Dedan Kimathi Papers
- Kenya: A Prison Notebook
- Mother Kenya: Letters From Prison 1982–1988
- A Season of Blood: Poems from Kenyan prisons
