= Marjorie Oludhe Macgoye =

Kenyan writer (1928–2015)

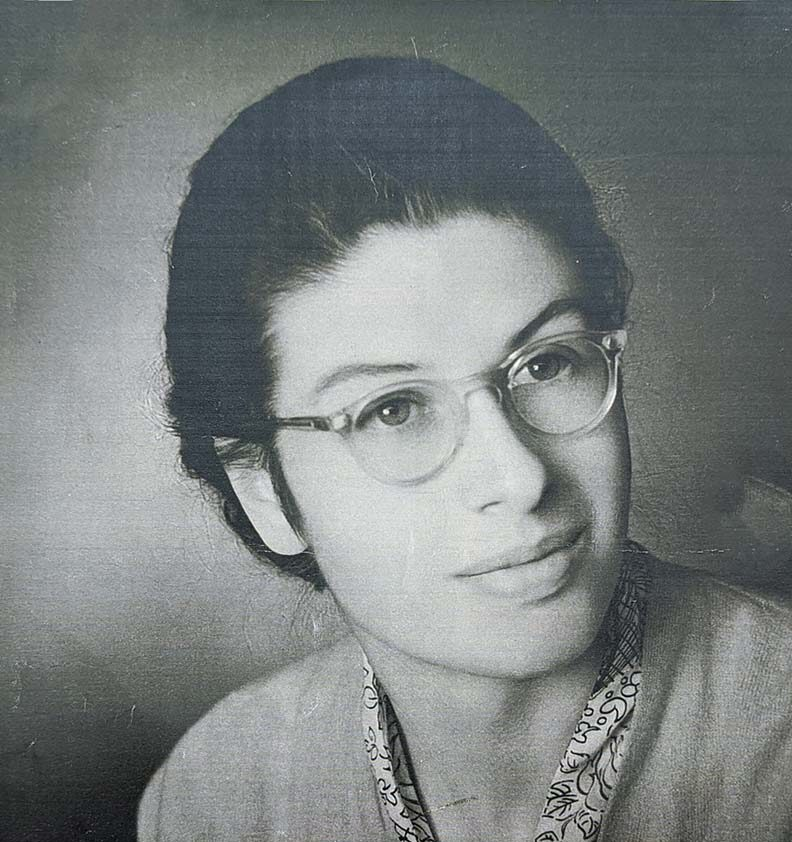
- Born: Marjorie Phyllis King; 21 October 1928; Southampton, England, UK
- Died: 1 December 2015 (aged 87); Nairobi, Kenya
- Citizenship: Kenyan
- Education: Royal Holloway, University of London
- Occupation: Writer
- Spouse: Daniel Oludhe Macgoye (m. 1960–1990)
- Children: Four
- Writing career
- Years active: 1983–2009
- Notable works: Murder in Majengo (1972); Coming to Birth (1986); The Present Moment (1987)
- Notable awards: Sinclair Prize

Marjorie Phyllis Oludhe Macgoye (21 October 1928 – 1 December 2015) was born in Southampton, England, but immigrated to Kenya soon after Kenya became independent. She was a poet, novelist, and a missionary bookseller. She studied at the University of London for both her bachelor and master's degree. In 1954, she moved to Kenya to sell books and, while there, she met Daniel Oludhe Macgoye, a medical doctor, and they were married in 1960. She became a Kenyan citizen in 1964.

After immigrating to Kenya, she began pursuing a career to become an author. At first, she published stories in magazines; as her success grew, she started writing works of longer length. In early 1970, her novels and poetry were being published. She won awards for many of her books, including for Growing Up at Lina School (1971) and Murder in Majengo (1972), but her most notable novel is Coming to Birth (1986). Her award-winning novels portray the life of a Kenyan woman during the time period 1956–1978.

== Early life ==
Marjorie Phyllis King was born on 21 October 1928 in Southampton, England, to Phyllis (née Woolcott) and Richard King. Her father started working as an apprentice at the Vosper Thornycroft shipyard and her mother was a teacher. An only child, Marjorie finished her secondary education in 1945 and studied English at Royal Holloway College, University of London. She worked at Foyles bookshop in London after graduating from college. She received a master's degree in English from Birkbeck College, University of London, eight years later.

== Career and marriage ==
Macgoye went to Kenya due to a job application to the Church Missionary Society (CMS), which led to an offer for her to run a CMS bookshop in Nairobi. In 1954, when she arrived in Kenya, the country was going through colonial conflict and was in a tense state. She participated in literacy projects for Africans, and would often give out Christian literature to female prisoners at Remand Prison in Nairobi. There she met Daniel Oludhe Macgoye, the medical officer, and they married in 1960. The couple moved to Alupe Leprosy Mission hospital, near the border separating Kenya and Uganda, and between 1961 and 1966, they had four children together: Phyllis, George, Francis and Lawrence.

In the latter half of the 1960s, Marjorie taught in Kisumu, and began to engage in the Luo community to which her husband and his family belonged, and learning its language, history, traditions and culture, The Luo community even titled her the "mother of Gem". She became a naturalized Kenyan citizen in 1964. In 1971, she and her children moved from Kenya for a job running the university library in Tanzania, while her husband stayed behind. She became the manager of the SJ Moore Bookshop in 1975. She ran literary readings and workshops for many Kenyan and east African writers. From 1983, she switched her focus to writing. During this period, she remained committed to social activism in many ways, such as participating in national debates.

== Works ==
- Growing Up at Lina School (1971)
- Murder in Majengo (1972)
- Coming to Birth (1986)
- The Present Moment (1987)
- Street Life (1987)
- Victoria and Murder in Majengo (1993)
- Homing In (1994)
- Chira (1997)
- The Black Hnad Gang (1997)
- Song of Nyarloka and Other Poems (1997)
- A Farm called Kishinev (2005)

== Notable works ==
Coming to Birth – Coming to Birth, which won the Sinclair prize, is a novel about the life of a Paulina. In this novel, Macgoye tries to compare the pre-colonial and post-colonial Kenya through the perspective of a Kenyan woman who left her village at the age of 16 to live with her new husband in Nairobi. The novel begins with the introduction of Martin Were, whom Paulina marries. He is educated and belongs to the middle working class. By Kenyan standards, he embodies all the characteristics of a young man with a successful future ahead. However, her husband tries to control her, which leads to an unhappy marriage filled with misunderstanding and disappointment. She suffered three miscarriages and could not fulfill the traditional role of women. Eventually, as Kenya is gaining its independence, she also gains some independence. Every miscarriage she has is a parallel to Kenya's struggle for independence. When she first left home with her husband, Kenya was in a state of emergency. She accepted a job abroad that separated her and her husband. She had to support herself through teaching needlework. She had a child through an affair with another man, but the child was killed, and she returned to Nairobi, where she meets her husband. Paulina was naïve and ignorant when the novel started, but towards its end, she is an independent woman capable of standing up for what she believes in.

The Present Moment – a novel about seven elderly women in an old people's home, who come from various tribal backgrounds. These women share their stories, including stories of love, political struggles they faced and the death of their children. This novel gives a good narrative of Kenyan history, the different experiences these women went through and the treatment of women in a patriarchal society. Through the interactions, readers understand the different levels of power and authority that men hold. Themes such as women being the property of men, women as decision makers, women as mothers and women as academics are discussed.

Chira – a novel in which the protagonist is diagnosed with AIDS. It is the first Kenyan novel to view AIDS as a serious matter. The title in tribal language is wasting disease, but it is also a metaphor for "contemporary Kenyan society" where there are obligations, hidden truths and responsibilities. In this novel, Macgoye explains to readers what AIDS is, what are the causes, how it spreads, and how to prevent the spread of it.

Homing In – this novel won second place for Kenya's Jomo Kenyatta Literature Prize Competition in 1995. Homing In is a novel about Ellen Smith. She is widowed European settler who lives with Martha Kimani, her African American caretaker. The novel references events like the soldier-settler scheme, the impact of World War 2 on Africa, the German bombing on London, Mau, the controversy over female circumcision, and Kikuyu independent schools. At the beginning of the novel there was a strong racial divide between the two women. However, towards the end of the novel the two women from different backgrounds realize they are vulnerable and need each other to survive. They form a friendship and give mutual support.

Freedom Song – a poem (ballad) about a young girl, Atieno who was taken in by her uncle. She was oppressed and exploited by her own uncle. She was treated like a slave. She worked without any payment and did not attend school. She eventually dies due to post-partum bleeding due to her young age.

Victoria and Murder in Majengo – the protagonist, named Victoria, is a successful businesswoman who owns a shop in Majengo, Nairobi. She came from the rural Luo community and built her success through many sacrifices. Her past is unravelled when an alleged nephew from Kano, Lucas, visits Victoria for a job. Victoria was married when she was aged 15 because of hunger. Her father failed to foresee a flood and did not take any action to save their livestock and crops. She was unhappy in her marriage and thought having a child would change the situation, but her husband was infertile. After trying for two years to conceive, she was impregnated by another man. Victoria decided that she no longer wanted to be married and ran off after her child's birth. She was rescued by Chelagat, a successful businesswoman and brothel owner. Victoria worked as a prostitute to make ends meet. Eventually she became financially independent and eventually obtained some education. Victoria found out Chelagat was working as a spy by obtaining information from men and did the same. Victoria opens shop Nairobi while running a side business with the cover of the shop.

== Critical reception ==
In Victoria and Murder in Majengo and Coming to Birth it reconstructs the image of women through assigning attributes like courage and strength to the protagonists of her novels. In a patriarchal world, these attributes belong to men but not women. In Victoria and Murder in Majengo, Victoria takes over many traditional roles that are considered masculine. Victoria redeemed herself through getting out of the marriage. Even though she had to work as a prostitute to pay the dowry back because her father did not have the means to do so. If she had waited for her father, it would have taken her longer to receive redemption. Here Victoria is redefining the traditional roles of women by not getting out of marriage. She no longer needs to take orders from men. Despite her profession, she was able to gain financial independence, which is traditionally a male’s role. Through opening her shop in Nairobi, she also redefines traditional gender roles by employing others and working as a spy. Victoria is very educated and has also raised a daughter who is just like Victoria.

Similarly, in Coming to Birth, Paulina redefines traditional gender roles by receiving education and joined a home craft school. She became a supervisor in Kenya and was able to become financially independent. She even provided more than her brothers and her husband. Their roles soon reversed as Martin was now dependent. Both Victoria and Paulina are women who were once submissive to men. They gained their independence through their courage and education. They gained financial independence through their career and became providers for others. The women stand up for themselves in various ways, which is Macgoye motivating present-day women reading her novel to stand up for themselves in a predominantly patriarchal society.

Macgoye published many works on various problems that Kenya has faced. Some of her works, such as Freedom Fighter, have been incorporated into the Kenyan school curriculum. Her works represent the voice of oppressed women to help tackle power and authority imbalances in society. In this poem, she discusses the issue of child labour, which is common in African societies. She also points issues regarding human rights violation such as child labor and inadequate parental care which are still common in not only Africa but around the world. This poem sends a message by discouraging these actions. In Nyarloka’s song, it depicts the struggle women face crossing into a new society; it shows what many East African women struggle with. Although the poem was written decades ago, it is still very relevant in the present. Much of Macgoye's work takes place in Majengo. Majengo is known as the red-light district where there is a lot of sex work and violence. Macgoye's home was church and a place where she provided for the unwanted individuals. She helped those with mental illness, AIDS, drug addicts, sex workers, and the homeless. She would provide support for abandoned wives and sex workers who could no longer work. Reporters, journalists, students, and others would come to her place as she tried to address problems and help those in need. She provides hope and unconditional love for those who were "unwanted".
