= Kenyan literature =

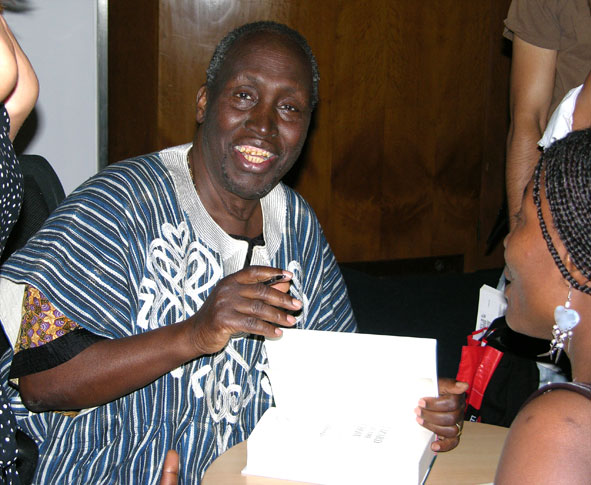
Ngũgĩ wa Thiong'o

Kenyan literature describes literature which comes from Kenya. Kenya has a long literary tradition, both oral and written; primarily in English and Swahili, the two official languages of the country.

== History ==
Kenya has a strong tradition of oral literature, which continues today in several languages. As a result of Kenya's history, including a period where it was a former British colony, Kenyan literature concurrently belongs to several bodies of writing, including that of the Commonwealth of Nations and of Africa as a whole. Most written literature is in English; some scholars consider Swahili to be marginalized in Kenyan literature.

== Notable writers ==
Important Kenyan writers include Grace Ogot, Meja Mwangi, Paul Kipchumba, Kinyanjui Kombani, Margaret Ogola, Ngũgĩ wa Thiong'o, Francis Imbuga, Yvonne Adhiambo Owuor and Binyavanga Wainaina.

== Notable works ==
One of the best known pieces of Kenyan literature is Utendi wa Tambuka, which translates to The Story of Tambuka. Written by a man named Mwengo at the court of the Sultan of Pate, the epic poem is one of the earliest known documents in Swahili, being written in the year 1141 of the Islamic calendar, or 1728 AD.

Thiong'o's first novel, Weep Not, Child, was the first novel in English to be published by an East African. His The River Between is currently on Kenya's national secondary school syllabus. His novel A Grain of Wheat was said to "...[mark] the coming of age of Anglophone literature in East Africa".

== Works set in Kenya ==
Numerous authors of European background also wrote or based their books in Kenya. The best-known of these include Isak Dinesen (the pen name of Karen Blixen), whose Out of Africa was the basis for the popular film starring Meryl Streep; Elspeth Huxley, author of The Flame Trees of Thika; Marjorie Oludhe Macgoye, whose Coming to Birth won the Sinclair Prize; and Beryl Markham, author of West with the Night.

== See also ==
- Swahili literature
- Culture of Kenya
- Music of Kenya

== Bibliography ==
- Bardolph, Jacqueline (1984). "The Literature of Kenya". The Writing of East and Central Africa. By Killam, G. D. East African Publishers. ISBN 978-0-435-91671-8.
