= African Writers Conference =

1962 African conference

In June 1962 a conference of African literature in the English language, the first African Writers Conference, was held at Makerere University College in Kampala, Uganda. Officially called a "Conference of African Writers of English Expression", it was sponsored by the Congress for Cultural Freedom and the Mbari Club in association with the Department of Extra-Mural Studies of Makerere, whose director was Gerald Moore.

The conference was attended by many prominent African writers, including: from West Africa Chinua Achebe, Wole Soyinka (later Nobel Laureate in Literature), John Pepper Clark, Obi Wali, Gabriel Okara, Christopher Okigbo, Bernard Fonlon, Frances Ademola, Cameron Duodu, Kofi Awoonor; from South Africa: Ezekiel Mphahlele, Bloke Modisane, Lewis Nkosi, Dennis Brutus, Arthur Maimane; from East Africa Ngũgĩ wa Thiong'o (at that time known as James Ngugi), Robert Serumaga, Rajat Neogy (founder of Transition Magazine), Okot p'Bitek, Pio Zirimu (credited with coining the term "orature"), Grace Ogot, Rebecca Njau, David Rubadiri, Jonathan Kariara; and from the African diaspora Langston Hughes. The conference was "not only the very first major international gathering of writers and critics of African literature on the African continent; it was also held at the very cusp of political independence for most African countries."

== Conference topics ==
The conference dealt with the issue of how the legacy of colonialism had left the African writer with a dilemma with regard to the language choice in writing. The questions raised and debated at the conference were:

- What constitutes African literature?
- Is it literature written by Africans, literature that depicts the African experience?
- Does African literature have to be written in African languages?

== Controversy ==
At the conference, several nationalist writers refused to acknowledge any literature written in non-African languages as being African literature. Ngũgĩ noted the irony of the conference's title, in that it excluded a great part of the population that did not write in English, while trying to define African literature but accepting that it must be in English. As he would describe it in his 1986 book Decolonising the Mind: The Politics of Language in African Literature: "The bullet was the means of the physical subjugation. Language was the means of the spiritual subjugation."

In an essay entitled "The Dead End Of African Literature", published in Transition in 1963, Obiajunwa Wali stated: "Perhaps the most important achievement of the last Conference of African Writers of English Expression held in Makerere College, Kampala, in June 1962, is that African literature as now defined and understood leads nowhere. The conference itself marked the final climax on the attack on the Negritude school of Léopold Senghor and Aimé Césaire.... Another significant event in the Conference, is the tacit omission of Amos Tutuola."

Ezekiel Mphahlele disagreed with Wali's criticisms, that writing in European languages like English and French makes "...African literature as now understood and practiced... only a minor appendage in the mainstream of European literature..." Mphahlele writes in response: "...English and French have become the common language with which to present a nationalist front against white oppressors. Where the white man has already retreated, as in the independent states, these two languages are still a unifying force..." Mphahlele goes on to explain the need for equity in publishing between African and European languages. Mphahlele then comments on the impracticalities introduced by writing in different African languages: "...Supposing we met at Makerere to discuss African literature in the indigenous languages, what common language would we have which would help us understand the books being discussed? How many writers, even if they all wrote in indigenous languages, would have understood what was being talked about in connection with vernacular texts? What would be the common problems to talk about, such as we had as writers of English?" Mphahlele concludes "...A writer must choose the medium that suits him best."

== Effect and legacy ==
Writing of the conference 50 years later, James Currey in Leeds African Studies Bulletin quoted Chinua Achebe as saying in 1989: "In 1962 we saw the gathering together of a remarkable generation of young African men and women who were to create within the next decade a corpus of writing which is today seriously read and critically valued in many parts of the world. It was an enormously important moment, and year, in the history of modern African literature."

The conference is regarded as a major milestone in African literature, and is thought to have defined many African authors' style of writing. For example, Currey notes that Ngũgĩ wa Thiong'o as a young student ventured to ask Chinua Achebe at the conference to read the manuscripts of his novels The River Between and Weep Not, Child, which would subsequently be published in Heinemann's African Writers Series, launched in London that year, with Achebe as its first advisory editor. Ngũgĩ subsequently rejected Christianity in 1976, and changed his original name from James Ngugi, which he saw as a sign of colonialism. He also resorted to writing in the Gikuyu language instead of English.

=== Memorial conference ===
"SOAS African Literatures Conference – 55 years after the first Makerere African Writers Conference" was organised as a memorial event taking place on 28 October 2017, hosted by the University of London's School of Oriental and African Studies (SOAS), with a keynote speech by Wole Soyinka.
