= Jonathan Kariara =

Kenyan poet

Jonathan Kariara (1935–1993) was a Kenyan poet and short story writer who wrote works including "A Leopard Lives in a Muu Tree".

== Biography ==
He was born in 1935 at the Church of Scotland Mission, Tumutumu, in Nyeri County, Kenya, in 1935.

In the 1950s, he attended Makerere University College in Kampala, Uganda. At Makere University College, Kariara edited and wrote for Penpoint, the college's literary magazine, and developed relationships with other young intellectuals from across Africa (including Rebeka Njau, David Rubadiri, and Ngũgĩ wa Thiong'o), many of whom would play important roles in developing postcolonial literature and thought in Africa.

After completing secondary education, Kariara worked for several years in Nairobi as a book editor for the East African Literature Bureau, known for publishing anthologies of English-language poetry from East Africa. Kariara also worked as manager of Oxford University Press's branch office in Nairobi. Over the same period, the late 1960s and 1970s, he edited the literary magazine Zuka, affiliated with the University of Nairobi Literature Department, and he ran regular workshops for writers in order to encourage and stimulate local literary creativity. In the late-1970s, his preferred stamping ground was Sadler House (now Consolidated Bank House), and Makerere University, where he encountered artistic and literary figures including Ngũgĩ wa Thiong'o, Okot P'Bitek and Elimo Njau. He later had a close literary kinship with poet-compatriot Marjorie Macgoye.

For Simon Gikandi, "Kariara's creative writing belongs solidly to what has come to be known as the Makerere School of English, a tradition characterized by attempts to use local materials and backgrounds while maintaining the formal conventions of English writing in both verse and prose." According to Mohamed Bakari and Ali A. Mazrui, because English was only used in the Makere College's formal pedagogy, while students spoke various ethnic languages in their downtime, this Makere School centered on formal, grammatrical English rather than local forms of English-based creole languages.
