= Wizard of the Crow =

2006 novel by Ngũgĩ wa Thiong'o

- First edition
- Author: Ngũgĩ wa Thiong'o
- Publisher: Harvill Secker
- Publication date: 2006
- Publication place: Kenya
- ISBN: 1-84655-034-3
- OCLC: 315389356
- Preceded by: Penpoints, Gunpoints and Dreams: The Performance of Literature and Power in Post-Colonial Africa

Wizard of the Crow (Gikuyu: Mũrogi wa Kagogo) is a 2006 novel written by Ngũgĩ wa Thiong'o and translated from the original Kikuyu into English by the author, his first novel in 20 years. The story is set in the imaginary Free Republic of Aburĩria, autocratically governed by one man, known only as the Ruler. The novel received the 2008 Tähtifantasia Award for the best foreign fantasy novel released in Finland in 2007.

== Reception ==
Wizard of the Crow has been widely and for the most part positively reviewed, with Complete Review saying: "Generally impressed (if also a bit overwhelmed), with most also finding some weaknesses". Laura Miller in Salon wrote: "This is a tale of eternal, essential, human folly, hilarious and endlessly inventive, like a cross between a Pynchon novel and A Confederacy of Dunces, reincarnated on African soil."

John Updike in The New Yorker pointed out that English-language readers would "do well to remember that it is a translation from a language whose narrative traditions are mostly oral and heavy on performance; the tale is fantastic and didactic, told in broad strokes of caricature ... seven hundred and sixty-six pages of fiction too aggrieved and grim to be called satire", and ultimately concludes: "The narrative, then, is a journey without a destination, and its characters are improv artists."

Jeff Turrentine in The New York Times noted that the novel "blends satire and polemic in its depiction of an African nation at a crossroads in the aftermath of white rule. An allegory presented as a modern-day folk tale (complete with tricksters, magic, disguised lovers and daring escapes), it represents Ngũgĩ's attempt to scrutinize his homeland by borrowing the same postcolonial magnifying glass that writers like Salman Rushdie and Derek Walcott have trained on India and the Caribbean. In his own words, Ngũgĩ has said his wish is 'to sum up Africa of the 20th century in the context of 2,000 years of world history.'"

The Guardian's reviewer Maya Jaggi wrote that "realism is not the chosen weapon in a novel whose absurdist, scatological satire is reminiscent of Alfred Jarry's Ubu plays, or Carlos Fuentes's novelistic skewering of Mexico's Machiavellis in The Eagle's Throne. ... Yet for all its grotesque hyperbole, Wizard of the Crow struck me as truthful in its dissection of power, and remarkably free of bitterness. At more than 700 pages, its flaws, of obsessive reiteration and prolixity, arise partly from its bold experimentation with oral forms, and from giving rein to the pathologies of the corrupt at the expense of the more intimate dilemmas of those who challenge them. But the poisonousness of its targets never infects the author's vision, nor his faith in people's power to resist. Perhaps that in itself is a triumph."

For Aminatta Forna, writing in The Washington Post: "Wizard of the Crow is first and foremost a great, spellbinding tale, probably the crowning glory of Ngũgĩ's life's work. He has done for East Africa what Ahmadou Kourouma's Waiting for the Wild Beasts to Vote did for West Africa: He has turned the power of storytelling into a weapon against totalitarianism."

From the perspective of Lindsay Barrett, Wizard of the Crow is "an incredible masterpiece": "This is a work that can genuinely be described as a tour de force. Apart from its substantial length and the prodigious feats of both linguistic dexterity and imaginative fertility displayed by Ngũgĩ in the course of telling his incredible tale, the book is simply a most impressive example of pure African storytelling. Although it is a complex satire on the exigencies of confusion and dictatorial ignorance that has bedevilled governance in many African nations of the post-colonial era, it is more than anything else a cracking adventure story as well as a fantastic psychological thriller. Ngũgĩ has managed to compose a believable tale out of the antics and presumptions of a most unbelievable set of characters. He keeps his readers enthralled through the credible emotional resemblance of the situations that he weaves to events in the contemporary history of several African nations."
