= Wanjikũ wa Ngũgĩ =

Kenyan writer (born 1970s)

- Born: Kenya
- Education: New York University (BA); University of Houston (MFA)
- Occupation: Writer
- Known for: Founder of Helsinki African Film Festival
- Father: Ngũgĩ wa Thiong'o
- Relatives: Mũkoma wa Ngũgĩ (brother)
- Website: Wanjikũ wa Ngũgĩ website

Wanjikũ wa Ngũgĩ (born 1970s) is a Kenyan writer, who has lived and worked in Eritrea, Zimbabwe and Finland. She is the founder and former director of the Helsinki African Film Festival (HAFF). Also a political analyst, she is a member of the editorial board of Matatu: Journal for African Literature and Culture and Society, and has been a columnist for the Finnish development magazine Maailman Kuvalehti. Among journals and newspapers in which her work has appeared are The Herald (Zimbabwe), The Daily Nation, Business Daily, Pambazuka News and Chimurenga. She is the author of a novel published in 2014 and a contributor to anthologies including New Daughters of Africa: An International Anthology of Writing by Women of African Descent (2019, edited by Margaret Busby), Nairobi Noir (2020, edited by Peter Kimani).

== Biography ==
Wanjikũ wa Ngũgĩ was born in Kenya into a family of writers that includes her father, Ngũgĩ wa Thiong'o, and her brother Mũkoma wa Ngũgĩ. She studied for a BA in political science and sociology at New York University and holds an MFA from the University of Houston. She later worked as an editor for the American publishing house Africa World Press, and has served in other editorial positions, such as on the editorial board of the journal Matatu.

After completing her studies she spent time in Eritrea, before moving to Zimbabwe, where she lived for five years and worked as an editor as well as production manager, also travelling during these years to different African countries, including South Africa, Botswana, Namibia, Tanzania, and Mozambique. In 2007, she and her Finnish partner moved to Helsinki, where she founded the Helsinki African Film Festival (HAFF).

Wanjikũ has written plays and short stories, and her first novel, The Fall of Saints, was published by Atria Books in 2014. Her short story "Hundred Acres of Marshland" featured in 2019's New Daughters of Africa, edited by Margaret Busby, and she was also a contributor to Nairobi Noir, edited by Peter Kimani (2020). Among other publications in which her short stories and essays have appeared are Houston Noir, The Barelife Review, St. Petersburg Review, Wasafiri, Auburn Avenue, Cunning Folk Magazine, and Chimurenga.

Wanjikũ's second novel, Seasons in Hippoland, was published by Seagull Press in 2021, characterised by one reviewer as a "dreamlike coming-of-age novel ... about the power of storytelling".

== Writings ==
=== Books ===
- The Fall of Saints, Atria Books, 2014. ISBN 9781476714936
- Seasons of Hippoland, Seagull Press, 2021. ISBN 9780857428943
