= Decolonizing Language and Other Revolutionary Ideas =

2025 book by Ngũgĩ wa Thiong'o

- Author: Ngũgĩ wa Thiong'o
- Language: English
- Subject: African literature, postcolonialism
- Genre: Essays, literary criticism
- Publisher: The New Press
- Publication date: 6 May 2025
- Pages: 224
- ISBN: 978-1-62097-932-7

Decolonizing Language and Other Revolutionary Ideas is a 2025 collection of essays by Kenyan writer and scholar Ngũgĩ wa Thiong'o. Published by The New Press, the book covers language, colonialism, literature, education and cultural identity, with particular attention to the place of African languages in postcolonial societies.

== Reception ==
In a review in The Guardian, scholar Simon Gikandi described the collection as Ngũgĩ's final literary statement on language. He noted that the twenty essays return to themes from Ngũgĩ's earlier work while extending his discussion of linguistic domination beyond Africa to other societies affected by colonialism. Publishers Weekly reviewed the collection describing the essays as studies of colonialism, politics and literature. The review highlighted Ngũgĩ's analysis of the relationship between language and power in postcolonial Africa.

== Synopsis ==
The essays examine the relationship between language and political and cultural power. The book covers the preservation and use of indigenous languages and discusses the effects of colonial language policies in Africa and around the world.
