= Devil on the Cross =

1980 novel by Ngũgĩ wa Thiong'o

- First edition
- Author: Ngũgĩ wa Thiong'o
- Original title: Caitaani mũtharaba-Inĩ
- Language: English, Gikuyu
- Publisher: Heinemann – African Writers Series
- Publication date: 1980
- Publication place: Kenya
- Media type: Print paperback
- Preceded by: Ngaahika Ndeenda
- Followed by: Education for a National Culture (Essay)

Devil on the Cross is a 1980 Kikuyu-language novel (orig. title Caitaani mũtharaba-Inĩ) written and self-translated by Kenyan novelist Ngũgĩ wa Thiong'o, which was later republished as part of the influential Heinemann African Writers Series in 1982. The novel, though dealing with a diverse range of literary conventions and themes, focuses on politically challenging the role of international money and culture in Kenya.

== Plot summary ==
The book begins as the storyteller presents his story in a hesitant tone: it is his obligation to hand-off this pitiful and perhaps dishonourable record of occasions in the town of Ilmorog.

In Chapter 2, the storyteller presents his hero, Jacinta Wariinga, who is toward the finish of her tie. During an undertaking with the "Rich Old Man of Ngorika", she got pregnant. The Rich Old Man deserted her. Wariinga had her child and came back to secretarial school, getting a new line of work at Champion Construction. Before long, her manager Kihara made advances on her, and Wariinga had to find employment elsewhere. This did not prevent her from losing her beau, John Kinwana, who accepted she had laid down with Kihara. Incapable to pay her lease, Wariinga has been tossed out of her studio loft by three hooligans following up on her landowner's requests. Despondently, Wariinga takes herself to the railroad tracks, where she expects to kill herself. In the event, she is saved by the appearance of a man named Muturi, who convinces her to give life another chance and gives her a solicitation to the "Devil's Feast".

When Wariinga understands that this Feast is occurring in her folks' old neighbourhood of Ilmorog, she chooses to go. She goes by "matatu" (taxi-transport), and on the long voyage, she bonds with her kindred travelers: Gatuīria, an African Studies educator who works abroad; Wangarī, a labourer lady from the profound nation; Mūturi, a mechanical specialist, and Mwĩreri wa Mũkiraaĩ, an agent. They likewise become acquainted with the driver, Mwaūra, a persevering man who loves cash and adores the rich. Businessperson Mwĩreri clarifies that the Devil's Feast is a challenge: the visitors will pick the seven cleverest criminals and looters in Ilmorog. Mwĩreri thinks this challenge is something to be thankful for. It is not generally sorted out by the Devil, he clarifies, but rather by the Organization for Modern Theft and Robbery. The event for the Feast is a visit by remote visitors from the Thieves' and Robbers' relationship of America, England, Germany, France, Italy, Sweden, and Japan. The travellers concur that they will all go together to the Devil's Feast.

At the Feast, Wariinga and different travellers witness the neighbourhood Kenyan bourgeoisie (the individuals from the Organization for Modern Theft and Robbery) each set out their case for the title of cleverest cheat. Each man brags of an alternate plan that he has used to ransack Kenyan specialists of the estimation of their work. Mwĩreri recommends that the Organization drive the outsiders out of Ilmorog so as to take a greater cut of the riches for themselves; a hullabaloo breaks out. Wariinga and Gatuīria choose to stay as spectators, while Wangarī and Mūturi, frightened by what they have heard, choose to call the police to capture oneself broadcast Thieves and Robbers. Notwithstanding, when the police show up they capture just Wangarī, and drag her away. Mūturi raises a horde of neighborhood laborers, understudies, scholarly people and workers, who walk on the cavern where the Feast is occurring. They figure out how to separate the occasion; however, the individuals from the Organization and their outside visitors all break.

Two years pass. Wariinga is locked in to Gatuīria, and through extensive and costly preparing, she has satisfied an old fantasy about turning into an architect at a carport. In the meantime, Gatuīria has completed the melodic structure he has been taking a shot at, respecting Kenyan history. Wariinga's old chief, Kihara, with the support of businesspeople from America, Germany, and Japan, purchases the carport where Wariinga works, so he can wreck it and develop a traveller inn on the site. Gatuīria takes Wariinga to meet his folks. There she discovers that Gatuīria's father is the "Rich Old Man" who left her when she was pregnant. At long last Wariinga snaps. She shoots Gatuīria's father and a few different visitors, whom she perceives from the Devil's Feast. Gatuīria is left standing, uncertain whose side to take, as Wariinga strides from the house.

== Characters ==
- Jacinta Wariinga: The protagonist who struggles in the wake of Kenyan independence. She spirals into a suicidal depression in the rising action of the book, but then right as she goes to take her own life, someone stops her and takes her on an enlightening yet painful journey of discovery.
- Muturi: The mysterious figure who finds her and stops Jacinta from killing herself, He invites her to attend a feast called "The Devil's Feast".

== Significance of the work ==
In an academic article on the varying notions of post-colonialism for PMLA, Macalester professor David Chioni Moore compares Ngũgĩ's decision to write Devil on the Cross in Gikuyu with Chaucer's choice of vernacular English (rather than Latin) as his written medium.

== Additional analysis ==
- Mugo, Jane Wanjiru, and Lucy Kawira Njeru. "Utilization of proverbial wisdom in enhancing harmony in sports: A case of devil on the cross." Edition Consortium Journal of Literature and Linguistic Studies 2, no. 1 (2020): 175-182.
