= Mũkoma wa Ngũgĩ =

Kenyan poet and author (born 1971)

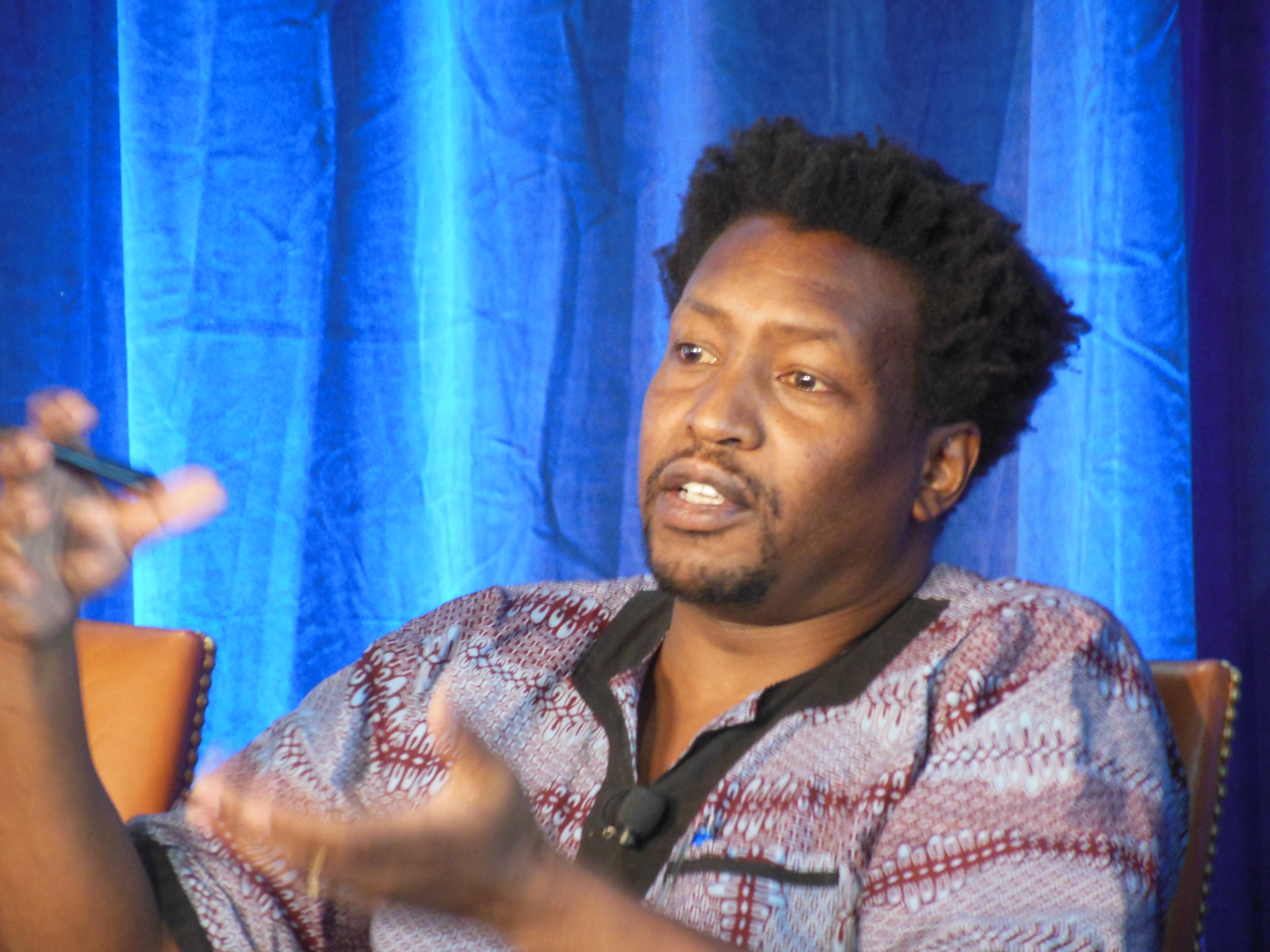
- Mũkoma in 2019
- Born: 1971 (age 54–55); Evanston, Illinois, US
- Education: Albright College (BA); Boston University (MA); University of Wisconsin–Madison (PhD)
- Employer: Cornell University
- Parent: Ngũgĩ wa Thiong'o (father)
- Relatives: Wanjikũ wa Ngũgĩ (sister)
- Writing career
- Genre: Poetry
- Website: mukomawangugi.com

Mũkoma wa Ngũgĩ (born 1971) is a Kenyan American poet, author, and academic. He is associate professor of literatures in English at Cornell University and co-founder of the Safal-Cornell Kiswahili Prize for African Writing. His father is the author Ngũgĩ wa Thiong'o.

== Early life and education ==
Mũkoma was born in 1971 in Evanston, Illinois, US, but raised in Kenya, before returning to the United States for his university education. He holds a BA degree in political science from Albright College and an MA in creative writing from Boston University. He received his Ph.D. from the University of Wisconsin at Madison, where he specialized in how questions of authorized and unauthorized English, or standard and non-standard English, influenced literary aesthetics in Romantic Britain and Independence-Era Africa.

== Career ==
Mũkoma is an associate professor of English at Cornell University.

He is the author of several books, including Conversing with Africa: Politics of Change (2003, described by New Internationalist as "a wide-ranging investigation of Africa's dilemmas"), Hurling Words at Consciousness (poetry, Africa World Press, 2006) and Nairobi Heat (novel, 2009). His most recent book is The Rise of the African Novel: Politics of Language, Identity, and Ownership (2018).

His short story "How Kamau Wa Mwangi Escaped into Exile" was shortlisted for the Caine Prize in 2009 and is included in the anthology Work in Progress - And Other Stories (Caine Prize: Annual Prize for African Writing) (New Internationalist, 2009). His work was also shortlisted for the 2010 Penguin Prize for African Writing.

He has published poems in Tin House Magazine, Chimurenga, Brick magazine, Smartish Pace, and Teeth in the Wind, One Hundred Days (Barque Press); New Black Writing (John Wiley and Sons); Réflexions sur le Génocide rwandais/Ten Years Later: Reflections on the Rwandan Genocide (L'Harmattan). Some of his poems have been archived on Badilisha Poetry X-Change.

== Political opinions and activism ==
Mũkoma is a columnist for BBC Focus on Africa magazine and former co-editor of Pambazuka News. In addition, he has published political essays and columns in the LA Times, Radical History Review, World Literature Today, Mail and Guardian, Zimbabwe’s Herald, Kenya’s Daily Nation, The EastAfrican, Kwani? journal, and zmag.org among other publications.

Mũkoma stated that with Queen Elizabeth II's death, there needs to be a "dismantling" of the Commonwealth and a real reckoning with colonial abuses.

In a 2013 The Guardian piece, he argued that the destruction of the Islamic Courts Union during the Ethiopian invasion of Somalia was the cause for Al-Shabaab's rise and the later Westgate mall attack.

With two Cornell graduate students, Sriram Parasurama and Momodou Taal, who holds UK and Gambian citizenship, Mũkoma is a plaintiff in a lawsuit filed by the American-Arab Anti-Discrimination Committee to block the enforcement of executive orders by President Donald Trump through deportation of foreign students and staff in higher education who were involved in pro-Palestinian protests.

== Personal life ==
In March 2024, Mũkoma posted on Twitter that his father Ngũgĩ had physically abused his mother, now deceased.

== Books ==
- Mũkoma wa Ngũgĩ (2003). Conversing with Africa: the politics of change. Harare, Zimbabwe: Kĩmaathi Pub. House. ISBN 978-0-7974-2561-3.
- Mũkoma wa Ngũgĩ (2006). Hurling words at consciousness: poems. Trenton, NJ: Africa World Press. ISBN 978-1-59221-462-4. OCLC 68965648.
- Mũkoma wa Ngũgĩ (2010). Nairobi heat. Melville international crime. Brooklyn, N.Y: Melville House. ISBN 978-1-935554-64-6. OCLC 694832870.
- Ngugi, Mukoma wa (2013). Black star Nairobi. ISBN 978-1-61219-210-9.
- Killing Sahara – novel (Kwela Books, 2013), ISBN 978-0795704840
- Mũkoma wa Ngũgĩ (2015). Mrs. Shaw. Modern African Writing series. Athens: Ohio University Press. ISBN 978-0-8214-2143-7.
- Mũkoma wa Ngũgĩ (2016). Logotherapy. African book poetry series. Lincoln: University of Nebraska Press. ISBN 978-0-8032-9067-9.
- Ngugi, Mukoma wa; Ngugi, Mukoma wa (2018). The rise of the African novel: politics of language, identity, and ownership. African perspectives. Ann Arbor: University of Michigan Press. ISBN 978-0-472-05368-1.
