= Wangui wa Goro =

Kenyan academic, translator and writer (born 1961)

Wangūi wa Goro
- Born: 1961 (age 64–65); Kenya
- Education: University of Leicester; University of London; Middlesex University
- Occupations: Academic, social critic, researcher, translator and writer

Wangūi wa Goro (born 1961) is a Kenyan academic, social critic, researcher, translator and writer based in the UK. As a public intellectual she has an interest in the development of African languages and literatures, as well as being consistently involved with the promotion of literary translation internationally, regularly speaking and writing on the subject. Professor Wangūi wa Goro is a writer, translator, translation studies scholar and pioneer who has lived and lectured in different parts of the world including the UK, USA, Germany and South Africa.

== Early life and education ==
She was born in Kenya but left to study in Europe for her undergraduate studies in Modern Languages and Economics at the University of Leicester. She continued to pursue her studies in education at the then University of London (now part of the University College of London), and later her doctoral studies in Translation Studies at Middlesex University.

== Career ==
In 2020, she was awarded an Honorary Professorship at SOAS University of London and appointed as a visiting professor at King's College London.

She has worked in local government, also as an academic in the humanities in the UK, and additionally in international development contexts.

Owing to her activism and involvement in human rights activism for democracy in Kenya, Wa Goro lived in exile in England for many years. She supported many movements for justice and freedom, including the Anti-Apartheid Movement, and was also involved in the women's movement as a feminist, working to pioneer Black and African Feminist work in the UK and in Europe.

She has translated the works of award-winning authors, including Ngũgĩ wa Thiong'o's satire Matigari and his children's works Njamba Nene and the Flying Bus (1986) and Njamba Nene's Pistol (1990), from Gikuyu into English, as well as Véronique Tadjo's poetry book A vol d'oiseau (As the Crow Flies, Heinemann African Writers Series, 2001) from French.

Wa Goro's own writing encompasses poetry, essays, short stories, fiction and non-fiction. Her short story "Heaven and Earth" (Macmillan) has been taught on the Kenyan curriculum. She has also been an active campaigner for human rights in Africa and Europe, and co-edited with Kelly Coate and Suki Ali the book Global Feminist Politics: Identities in a Changing World (Routledge, 2001). Publications to which she has contributed include Under the Tree of Talking: Leadership for Change in Africa (2007), edited by Onyekachi Wambu, the 2006 anthology African Love Stories, edited by Ama Ata Aidoo, and New Daughters of Africa (2019), edited by Margaret Busby.

She is a regular participant at the Royal African Society's annual literature and book festival Africa Writes, among other events curating the symposium "Africa in Translation" that features writers, artists, publishers, translators, readers and scholars, under the aegis of SIDENSi, an international organisation set up "to promote translation, traducture and information knowledge management across disciplines". She is also the founder member of TRACALA, the Translation Caucus of the African Literature Association.

Over the years she has also been on advisory committees or boards of numerous organisations, including the Women's Studies Network UK, the British Centre for Literary Translation, the Arts Council England, PEN International and the African Literature Association. She has served as a council member of the Caine Prize for African Writing, for which she was a judge in 2007.

== Awards and honours ==
She is the recipient of the 2021 Flora Nwapa Society Award.
