= A Grain of Wheat =

1967 novel by Ngũgĩ wa Thiong'o

- First edition
- Author: Ngũgĩ wa Thiong'o
- Language: English
- Genre: Historical novel
- Published: 1967 (Heinemann)
- Publication place: Kenya
- Media type: Print (Hardback & Paperback)
- Pages: 247 pp
- Preceded by: The River Between
- Followed by: This Time Tomorrow (play)

A Grain of Wheat is a historical novel written by Kenyan novelist Ngũgĩ wa Thiong'o, first published as part of the influential Heinemann African Writers Series. It was written while he was studying at Leeds University and first published in 1967 by Heinemann. The title is taken from the Gospel of John, 12:24.

The novel weaves together several stories set during the state of emergency in Kenya's struggle for independence (1952–59), focusing on the quiet Mugo, whose life is ruled by a dark secret. The plot revolves around his home village's preparations for Kenya's independence day celebration, Uhuru day. On that day, former resistance fighters General R and Koinandu plan on publicly executing the traitor who betrayed Kihika (a heroic resistance fighter hailing from the village).

In 2022, A Grain of Wheat was included on the "Big Jubilee Read" list of 70 books by Commonwealth authors, selected to celebrate the Platinum Jubilee of Elizabeth II.

== Plot summary ==
The events of the novel take place in the days of 1963 before and on the day of Uhuru, Kenya's independence from colonial rule. The novel also features flashbacks of the past of the Kenya Colony including the villagization in the 1950s.

Mugo, an introverted villager of Thabai, does not want to give a speech at Uhuru, even though town elders ask him to. The village thinks him a hero for his stoicism and courage while he was in detention during Kenya's State of Emergency, but he labors under a secret: he betrayed their beloved Mau Mau fighter, Kihika. He is restless and can achieve no peace in the village. Kihika had joined the Mau Mau as a young man and attained fame for capturing the police garrison at Mahee and killing the cruel District Officer (‘DO’) Robson, but after Mugo betrayed him in secret, he was captured and hanged. Those planning Uhuru want to honor him. Mugo had betrayed Kihika because he was unsettled by the young man's zeal and because of the reward offered for his head, but as soon as he betrayed him he felt remorse. Most people, including General R. and Koina, two Mau Mau soldiers, believe Karanja was the one who betrayed Kihika. They plan on executing him at Uhuru.

Mugo was not the only man from Thabai who spent time in detention camp. Gikonyo, a well-respected businessman and former carpenter, was also taken to a camp. Before the camp he was very much in love with his beautiful wife Mumbi, the sister of Kihika. He had won her love even though many, including Karanja, a friend of Kihika, sought her love as well. He dreamt of her while he was away, and was horrified to find out that Mumbi had borne a child by Karanja during his imprisonment. He does not believe they can ever repair their relationship, and he throws himself into his work.

Karanja works at Githima, a Forest Research Station founded by the colonial government. He tries to cultivate the approval of the DO, John Thompson, who is stationed there with his wife Margery. Thompson was once destined for an illustrious career, but it was derailed by a hunger strike and violence at Rira, the camp where Mugo was. Now Thompson is at Githima, but is preparing to leave Kenya forever because he does not want to be around when whites are no longer in charge. Karanja did not join the freedom movement but rather started to work for the whiteman, first joining the Kikuyu Home Guard and then becoming Chief during the Emergency. This incurred a lot of resentment from people; however, Karanja was simply looking out for himself.

Mumbi, distressed that her husband no longer loves her, comes to see Mugo. She confides in him the story of how she and Gikonyo fell in love, and how sad she was when he was away in camp. She only fell for Karanja's advances when she heard Gikonyo was returning and became deliriously happy. She begs Mugo to come to Uhuru; on a second visit to him, she begs him again. Mugo becomes violent and says he betrayed Kihika. Mumbi is shocked, but she does not want any more blood shed for her brother.

Uhuru arrives, the day first rainy and then sunny. People are joyful and all of them want to see Mugo, even though he has said he is not coming. There are games and speeches. There is also a spontaneous running race, and Gikonyo and Karanja find themselves competing with each other (much as they competed in a race for Mumbi's attention long ago). They stumble, though, and Gikonyo breaks his arm and has to go to the hospital.

General R. gives a speech instead of Mugo and calls for the traitor to step forward, assuming it will be Karanja. Mugo comes out of the crowd and says it is he who did it; he feels a sense of freedom at first, quickly followed by terror. No one accosts him, and the confused crowd parts and lets him go.

Later, General R. and Koina come to arrest him and tell him he will have a private trial. Mugo makes peace with this, deciding he will accept his punishment.

Some of the village elders feel that Uhuru did not go well, and that there is something wrong.

Karanja heads back to Githima. He is unhappy and considers killing himself in front of a train. Ultimately, he decides against this.

Gikonyo wakes in the hospital and finds himself ready to make amends with Mumbi. When she visits him, he tells her he is ready to speak of the child he has assiduously ignored since he came back. She tells him it must wait until they can have a serious and heartfelt discussion of their wants and needs. He is happy, and plans to carve a stool featuring an image of a pregnant Mumbi.

== Characters ==
- Mugo, a loner who became a hero after leading a hunger strike in a detention camp for Mau Mau rebels and trying to stop a village guard from beating a pregnant woman to death. Although he is thought to be a hero throughout the whole book, he is the traitor who betrayed Kihika to the colonial government in the hope of collecting a reward.
- Gikonyo, an ambitious carpenter and business man married to Mumbi. He confessed to taking the oath of the resistance while in a concentration camp, securing an early release only to find that his wife had borne a child with his hated rival Karanja while he was away.
- Mumbi, the wife of Gikonyo and sister of Kihika. While Gikonyo was imprisoned she slept with Karanja, who had been appointed village chief by the colonial power.
- Karanja, a Kenyan collaborator and widely suspected by the others to be the traitor.
- Kihika, a resistance fighter who conquered a police station and killed the hated District Officer Robson. He was caught and hanged after being betrayed by Mugo.
- John Thompson, a white settler and administrator of Thabai, who believes in the ideals of the colonial "civilising mission" and despises Africans.

== Reception ==
For Jonatan Silva, reviewing the book for A Escotilha, A Grain of Wheat is an important portrait of Kenya struggle for independence. "He made a game of mirrors in this novel", wrote Silva.
