= The Trial of Dedan Kimathi =

1976 play by Ngũgĩ wa Thiong'o with Micere Githae Mugo

- Authors: Ngugi Wa Thiong'o; Micere Githae Mugo
- Language: English
- Genre: Drama
- Publication date: 1976
- ISBN: 1-478-61131-6

The Trial of Dedan Kimathi is a 1976 play written by Kenyan playwrights Ngugi wa Thiong’o and Micere Githae Mugo. The story centres on the trials of Dedan Kimathi, a Kenyan national hero who resisted colonialism in Kenya, and the pressure put on him to disclose his allies to the colonial authorities.

== Plot ==
Kimathi is captured and the colonial authorities say they will put him on trial. In his first trial, Kimathi meets with Shaw Henderson. During the meeting, Kimathi is told he will be released if he pleas for his life, but he rejects the offer. In his second trial, Kimathi meets with a delegation. A banker in the delegation argues that Kenya's economy grew under the colonial government, which Kimathi refutes. In his third trial, Kimathi meets with a priest, a businessman and a politician, who all tempt him to surrender. Kimathi is briefly swayed, but rejects their offer. In the four trial, Kimathi meets with Shaw Henderson again. Henderson tortures Kimathi in an attempt to get him to reveal the identities of his fellow revolutionist, but Kimathi refuses.
