= Matigari ma Njiruungi =

1986 novel by Ngũgĩ wa Thiong'o

Matigari ma Njirũũngi
- First edition
- Author: Ngũgĩ wa Thiong'o
- Language: Kikuyu
- Publisher: Heinemann – African Writers Series
- Publication date: 1986
- Publication place: Kenya
- Media type: Print Paperback
- Preceded by: Mother, Sing For Me
- Followed by: Njamba Nene and the Cruel Chief

Matigari ma Njirũũngi is a 1986 novel by author Ngũgĩ wa Thiong'o. It directly translates to Remains of Bullets in Kikuyu language.

== Plot summary ==
The story begins with Matigari burying his weapons under a fig tree. After killing his oppressor, Howard Williams, he vows to resolve conflicts peacefully from now on. Before returning home, however, he wants to find his people.

He seems to have been away for a longer time, as he marvels at the changes he sees: people are now driving their own cars, and the city has grown considerably. He decides to start looking for his people at a factory. However, he is appalled when he discovers that some children pay an entrance fee to rummage through the garbage at a dump. One boy fights another for a shoelace, so he intervenes and chases the bully away. The other boy, Muriuki, then leads him to a scrap yard, explaining that the children here use old cars for shelter. When Matigari tries to get to them, they throw stones at him until he becomes unconscious.

A factory worker named Ngaruro comes to Matigari's aid, bringing him to a cooler place where he can recover from his injuries. On the way, Matigari tells Ngaruro the story how he killed Mr. Williams for oppressing and exploiting the people: He wanted to kill Mr. Williams when he was on the telephone, when his servant, Mr. Boy, came in and jumped on his back. Seeing that he would not stand a chance against two people, Matigari escaped with Mr. Williams chasing him. Eventually, however, Matigari was able to kill Williams in the mountains. Hearing the name Williams, Ngaruro mentions that the factory owner goes by the same name and that the name of his deputy is Boy. Matigari thinks this is a coincidence.

Matigari and Ngaruro finally reach a bar, where Matigari is supposed to rest. However, Ngaruro cannot stay with him, as he has to go back to the factory early to be on time for a strike. Matigari orders food and drink but does not eat anything. Instead, he is harassed by a prostitute called Guthera, who is hiding from two policemen. When she sees them heading toward the bar, she tries to escape. However, the policemen catch her and set their dog on her. Matigari intervenes without any fear, telling the policemen to stop threatening innocent people. His courage frightens the two cops, who eventually let go of Guthera.

Back at the bar, Guthera explains that she hates the police for killing her father, who was arrested because he was a patriot fighting for independence. As a way of thanking Matigari for saving her life, she decides to stay with him and help him get home. The group eventually reaches an enormous mansion which Matigari claims is his. They are stopped by two men, who turn out to be the sons of Mr. Williams and Mr. Boy. Robert Williams is a powerful man, who has sold the house to John Boy Junior. They demand to see a title deed from Matigari, proving his ownership of the house. Matigari refuses to cooperate and is arrested when he tries to open the gate.

He finds himself in a dark cell with other inmates, who were arrested for crimes they committed out of desperation, or for "spreading communism." Matigari shares his food with them, which reminds the drunk inmate of the last supper. When he tells them how he got arrested, the inmates are amazed to see this freedom fighter in person, as they have already heard the story of him confronting the police.

Having exchanged their stories, the inmates are released under mysterious circumstances, which leads to Matigari becoming a legend who is compared to an angel and even God himself for being able to escape prison.

People all over the country have been adding more fantastic details to his stories, glorifying him as a saint. When he now roams the country on his quest to find truth and justice, he is constantly sent away because the people do not recognize him. He visits ordinary people until an old woman tells him to go to the students, as they are also searching the truth. As it turns out, however, the student and the teacher are too afraid to help Matigari out. He then decides to go to the church to ask the priest for advice.

The priest, being a puppet of the government, is no help either. Instead, he suggests Matigari attend a meeting later that day and talk to the Minister for Truth and Justice himself. At the meeting, which is observed by representatives from a number of Western countries, the prisoners who escaped with Matigari earlier are presented to the public and convicted by judges and a jury of dignitaries loyal to the government. The only man who is not convicted turns out to be an informer.

The Minister also announces that Mr. William's company has graciously given shares to the great leader and himself, claiming that now the people own part of the company, as the government is their party.

Matigari confronts the Minister for Truth and Justice directly, calling his government unlawful and accusing him of being part of the oppressing force, which exploits their people. The Minister presents Matigari as a madman, before sending him and Ngaruro, who stood up for the workers' rights, to a mental asylum. The people at the assembly, however, start singing songs about revolution, which are quickly banned by the Minister.

After the meeting, the government keeps imposing stricter laws to oppress the people in an effort to eradicate the revolutionary thoughts of the people. At the mental hospital, Matigari decides to dig up his weapons and fight the oppressors with violence, as he has realized that words and reasoning alone do not affect them.

Again, with the help of Guthera and Muriuki, he manages to escape from the mental asylum. He plans to get his weapons and attack Mr. Williams' house to take what is his. On the way to the tree where his guns are buried, the group manages to steal a Mercedes from a couple having sex in the car, which they later find out belongs to the wife of the Minister of Truth and Justice. The news on the radio informs them of Ngaruro's death.

Matigari is not able to get to the tree, however, after the informer has discovered him. Chased by the police, he drives the Mercedes through the front door into Mr. Williams' house. On the way, he sees masses of people waiting for a miracle to happen, as the word of his return has spread. The house eventually explodes, but Matigari is able to escape.

Guthera, Muriuki, and Matigari then try to run away from the police, who are relentlessly chasing them. Just before reaching a river, which Matigari says will lead to their safety, he and Guthera are gunned down. Their bodies fall into the river and are never found, leading to new myths and legends about Matigari having survived. Muriuki, the only one having survived the struggle, eventually reaches the fig tree, digs up Matigari's guns and starts to sing the song of victory.

== Characters ==
- Matigari: The protagonist of the story. In the beginning, he killed an imperialist oppressor, swearing that from now on he will be peaceful. However he is appalled by the current state of the country because he thought that after his fight for freedom his people would have better lives instead, he has to witness that a new generation of imperialists continues to oppress his people. He then decides to dig up his weapons and fight for his country with violence.
- Muriuki: A poor boy who lives in the wreck of a Mercedes, which makes him think that he is better than the other boys in the scrap yard. Matigari protects Muriuki from a bully and since then he became a loyal companion of Matigari. In the end, he is the only one who survives the manhunt for Matigari. He digs up Matigari's weapons and vows to continue fighting for his cause.
- Ngaruro: He is the leader of the workers' strike, demanding better conditions and higher salaries for the workers because he knows they are being exploited. He is arrested together with Matigari and later brought to a mental asylum for his 'mad' ideas. Shortly after having escaped from the asylum, he is killed by the police.
- Guthera: A prostitute that harassed Matigari. After he rescued her from the police, she apologizes and follows Matigari to make up for her wrongdoing. She tells him that her father, a patriot, was killed by a policeman because she did not take his offer of exchanging sex with a pardon. She strongly supports Matigari's cause because she wants to fight for the liberation of women. After he gets arrested she offers herself to a policeman in order to obtain the keys to the prison cell that holds Matigari, therefore sacrificing her purity. During the manhunt in the end, however, she is the first one to be struck by the bullets, falling into the river together with Matigari.
- Minister for Truth and Justice: The face of oppressive government. He declares future strikes and even dreams illegal. He is proud of his government and the legal structure in the country, as during the assembly he demonstrates the arbitrary and inconsistent verdicts in front of representatives from other nations, which back his government.

== Major themes ==
=== Poverty and exploitation ===
Poverty as the prerequisite for exploitation is a central theme in the novel. When he comes back from the mountain, the first thing that strikes Matigari is the poverty of the ordinary people. Even the poorest children are exploited because they have to pay an entrance fee to the dump, which grants them the right to rummage through the garbage. Matigari intervenes when he sees two boys fighting for a shoelace, which indicates how poor the population is when even a cheap item like a used shoelace is considered valuable enough to be struggling for. The women at the bar explain that they have to sell their bodies just to feed their families, and the workers at the factory barely earn enough to make their ends meet. Matigari discovers that poverty is an essential tool for the imperialists, capitalists and the government to control people: The fear of losing their jobs is the foundation of their exploitation. Moreover, if people are so poor that they are desperate, they are more likely to accept lower wages, which maximizes the capitalists' profits. Ngugi wa Thiong'o explicitly mentions a series of Western and Asian countries and companies, which serve as symbols of capitalism, indicating that the entire world is tolerating the suffering of the African people for their own gain.

=== Oppression ===
Throughout the novel, the government is presented as an abstract force that oppresses its own citizens, thus securing their exploitation. It is ironic that it names itself "government of the people," when in fact it does nothing to improve the lives of the people. It is striking that in the beginning, Matigari does not go to the police for help, as he does not trust them. His inkling is later confirmed by two policemen chasing and threatening a woman because she did not want to engage in sexual intercourse with one of the cops. Moreover, the radio program "The Voice of Truth" constantly announces new measures to keep the people in line. While in the beginning gatherings of five or more citizens are prohibited, the government later even declares that dreams are forbidden—which underlines the absurdity of the measures as well as the government's desperation when the leaders realize that the revolutionary movement gains momentum. Other elements of oppression such as sentences without a trial or public trials to scare off potential revolutionaries are still all too common in many countries around the world, thus justifying the author's claim that the story does not have a fixed time or setting.

However, apart from the government, Western countries and their companies are also criticized as the driving force behind the government's oppression. Mr. Williams as the personification of imperialism donates money to the great leader, thus seeking to maintain the status quo; not only does he and therefore the imperialists tolerate the oppression of the people-he demands it to secure his profits that he makes by exploiting the people.

=== Revolution ===
As soon as Matigari learns that the freedom he fought for is still not obtained, he decides to stand up against the oppressors and start a revolution. In the beginning, he buries his weapons and puts on a belt of peace, indicating that he tries to start a peaceful revolution. However, he soon has to face the limitations of his endeavor: Even though he is courageous, the majority of people are too afraid of the government because they have informers everywhere, which means that there is an atmosphere of distrust. Moreover, the people are so focused on a glorified leader figure that they do not realize that they themselves are the key to break the chains of oppression: In the prison cell, for example, the murderer says, "Finding your mouth can't really be all that hard." While the murderer does not realize it, his words are an allegory of a call for a peaceful demonstration, where people are courageous enough to demand their rights.

Eventually, Matigari realizes that it is impossible to change the situation by being peaceful. With the Minister of Truth and Justice calling him a madman, he understands that the oppressors cannot be stopped by words or reason, as they have no desire to improve the living conditions of the people. He then decides to start a violent revolution. In the end, after he got shot by the police, he is considered a martyr, with his ideas and ideals living on in the myths told by the people. The child picking up his guns and singing the song of victory is a sign of hope that eventually the situation of the people can be improved.
