= David Gian Maillu =

Kenyan writer and publisher (1939-)

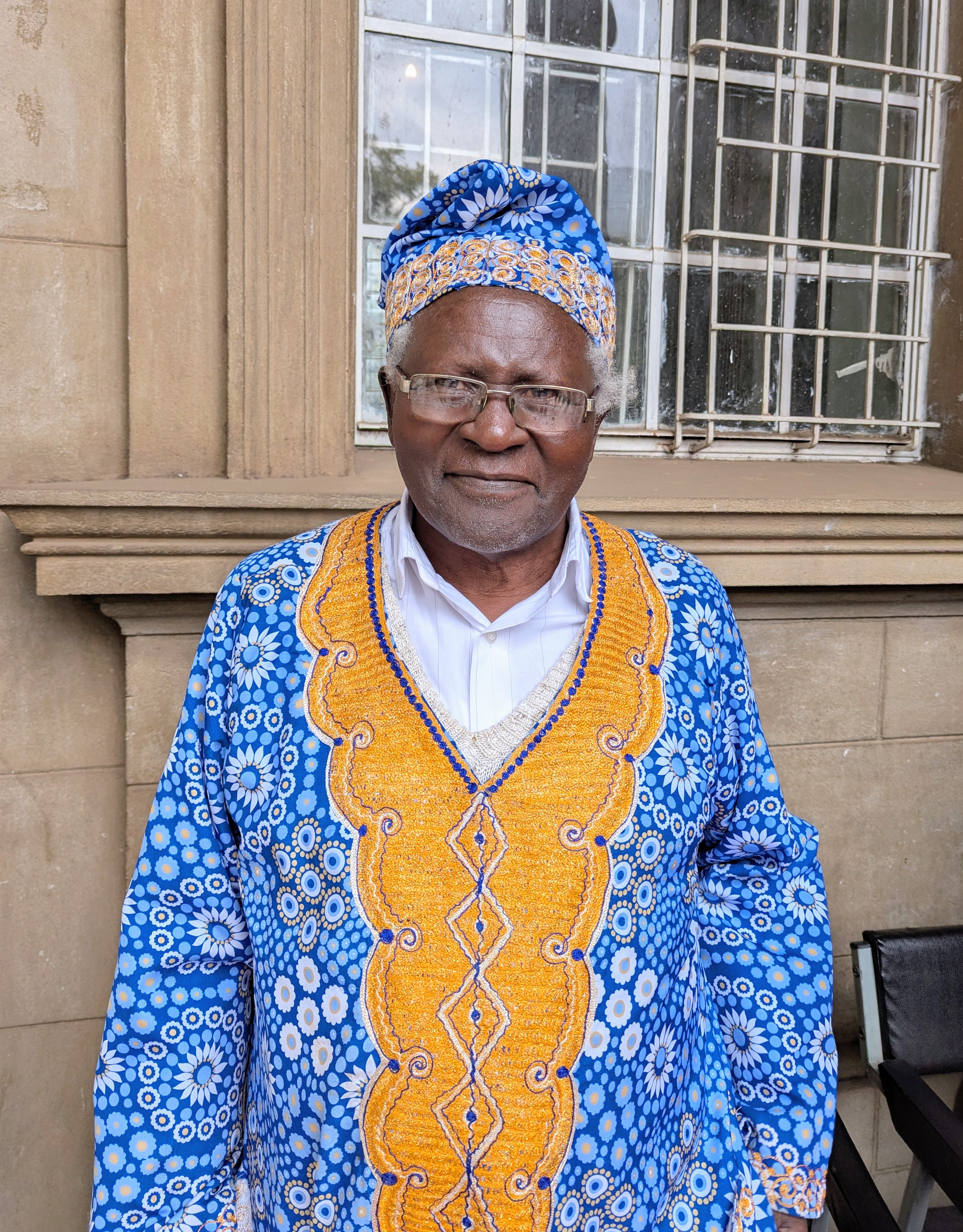
David Gian Maillu I. 2025.

David Gian Maillu (born 19 October 1939) is a Kenyan author and publisher. He is considered East Africa's most prolific writer, having published over 60 books between 1972 and 2021.

Most of his work is in English and Kiswahili, and he also published the first book of poetry in Kikamba.

== Life ==
At first I didn't even know whether an African could write...I had nobody to tell me how to write. I just kept on writing, first traditional stories, and then fiction, even science fiction, and then poetry and anything else. At a later stage I developed an interest in philosophy and practical psychology; in fact, human relations are what I mainly write about now.

— David Maillu, 1976

David G. Maillu was born in Kilungu Location in what was then Kenya Colony. He was the first child of Joseph Mulandi and Esther Kavuli. His parents were poor and illiterate, and their son's exact birthdate was uncertain.

Maillu taught himself to read and write before joining Machakos Technical School in 1951. Four years later, he earned the Cambridge School Certificate, having studied privately through the British Tutorial College.

Maillu then considered enrolling at the University College of Nairobi to study literature, but changed his mind when he discovered the syllabus featured only Western writers. His interest lay with Kenyan writers, including Ngũgĩ wa Thiong'o.

In 1964, he joined the Voice of Kenya radio station as a graphic designer. He soon became dissatisfied, but remained in the role until the early 1974 due to financial constraints.

In 1971, he married Hannelore Nuthmann, a German woman who moved to Kenya in 1967 to work for the Kenya Council of Churches. In 1974 their daughter, Elizabeth Kavuli, was born. Elizabeth was Maillu's second child. His first daughter, Christine Mwende, was born seven years earlier.

== Work ==
When David Maillu could not get any of the established publishers to accept his manuscripts, he set up Comb Books to publish his own work, with typesetting machinery paid for by Danish aid. He also started the cult of the tiny book for the handbag. One of his runaway sellers was After 4.30 which revealed the sexy experiences of secretaries after the office doors closed at the end of the working day; it was bound in a tiny format so that the secretary could discreetly slip the book into her handbag along with her comb when the boss came in.

— James Currey

David Maillu's earliest writing appeared in a magazine called Risk, based in Geneva, and in the East African Publishing House's Ghala magazine. He went on to publish over 60 books between 1972 and 2021. Many of these were self-published, first by his Comb Books imprint, then by David Maillu Publishing. By the 1980s his work was published by Macmillan.

Despite the scope of his work, Maillu has not been taken seriously by academics. Many of his early works were considered sexually explicit, and some were banned in Tanzania in June 1976.

=== Comb Books ===
Maillu established Comb Books in 1972, publishing dozens of books over the next five years. These were mostly written by Maillu himself.

The first release from Comb Books was also the first book of poetry ever published in Kikamba. Appearing under the title Kĩ Kyambonie: Kĩkamba nthimo, the book sold poorly due to the limited market, and Maillu quickly turned his attention to writing in English.

It was Maillu's 1973 thrillers, Unfit for Human Consumption and My Dear Bottle, that brought him his first success as a writer and publisher. These two publications also demonstrated Maillu's versatility, with the first written in prose and the second as a long narrative poem. My Dear Bottle proved controversial, with Maillu presenting AIDS as a new scourge of Africa. These early titles appeared as 'Comb Mini Novels'; small format novellas measuring 3.5 x 5 inches and sold for five East African Shillings.

In 1974 Maillu wrote and published After 4.30, which would again prove controversial. After 4.30 is long poem narrating the troubled life of a single mother, Emili Katongo, who is forced into prostitution. Schatzberg considers Maillu: 'remarkably ahead of his time in his acute perception of gender consciousness'.

In 1975 and 1976, Maillu published his epic verse narrative The Kommon Man over three volumes. The Kommon Man is narrated by an average Kenyan struggling to survive in the difficult economic climate of the day. A series of injustices occur, illustrating the corruption and inequalities faced by many in the country. Maillu's status as one of Kenya's most popular authors was clear by this stage, with the first print run of The Kommon Man running to 10,000 copies. It included a 20-item questionnaire to capture his readership's interests.

1976 also saw Maillu release two epistolary novels, Dear Monika and Dear Daughter, which again proved popular. By this stage, Comb Books employed seven or eight full-time staff and had purchased computerised typesetting equipment. The possibility of establishing offices in Europe and West Africa was considered. But a Tanzanian ban on his work that year, combined with political instability elsewhere in the region, marked the beginning of the end for Comb Books. No books were published in 1977, and in 1978 only two titles appeared. These were released under Maillu's pseudonym Vigad G. Mulila. The firm declared bankruptcy later that year.

=== David Maillu Publishers ===
Literary critics have not been very generous in their assessments of Maillu's work. No one has lavished praise on him, and few have admitted finding any redeeming value in what or how he writes. The general feeling among serious academics appears to be that such literature is beneath criticism for it is wholly frivolous, the assumption being that a scholar should not waste his time on art that aims to be truly popular. Yet Maillu cannot be ignored in any systematic effort to understand the evolution of an East African literature, for he has extended the frontiers of that literature farther than any other single writer.

— Bernth Lindfors, 1982

Maillu quickly established a new publishing company, this time under his own name. David Maillu Publishers first book, Kadosa, was released in 1979. Maillu considered this his favourite work, and it presents a blend of romance, adventure, science fiction, metaphysical speculation, and hallucinogenic horror. Lindfors considered Kadosa as 'remarkable' and 'utterly unlike anything he had written before'.

=== Macmillian and other publishers ===
David Maillu went on to publish for Macmillian and others from the early 1980s.

Titles included the popular Benni Kamba 009 books as well as 1991s Broken Drum, which is the story of a European traveller who believes Africans have AIDS simply because they are African.

== Bibliography ==
- Maillu, David G. (1972). Kisalu and His Fruit Garden and Other Stories. Nairobi: East African Publishing House.
- —— (1972). Kĩ Kyambonie: Kĩkamba nthimo (in Kamba). Nairobi: Comb Books.
- —— (1973). Unfit for Human Consumption. Nairobi: Comb Books.
- —— (1973). My Dear Bottle. Nairobi: Comb Books.
- —— (1974). Troubles. Nairobi: Comb Books.
- —— (1974). The Flesh. Nairobi: Comb Books.
- —— (1974). After 4:30. Nairobi: Comb Books.
- —— (1974). One by One. Nairobi: Comb Books.
- —— (1975). Chupa, mpenzi! (in Swahili). Nairobi: Comb Books.
- —— (1975). The Kommon Man: Part One. Nairobi: Comb Books.
- —— (1975). The Kommon Man: Part Two. Nairobi: Comb Books.
- —— (1976). The Kommon Man: Part Three. Nairobi: Comb Books.
- —— (1976). No!. Nairobi: Comb Books.
- —— (1976). Dear Monika. Nairobi: Comb Books.
- —— (1976). Kujenga na kubomoa (in Swahili). Nairobi: Comb Books.
- —— (1976). Dear Daughter. Nairobi: Comb Books.
- Mulila, Vigad G. (1978). English Punctuation. Nairobi: Comb Books.
- —— (1978). English Spelling and Words Frequently Confused. Nairobi: Comb Books.
- Maillu, David G. (1979). Kadosa. Nairobi: Maillu Publishing House.
- —— (1979). Jese Kristo. Nairobi: National Theatre Company and Maillu Publishing House.
- —— (1980). For Mbatha and Rabeka. London: Macmillan.
- —— (1980). Benni Kamba 009 in The Equatorial Assignment. London: Macmillan.
- —— (1980). Hit of Love: Wendo Ndikilo (in English and Kamba). Nairobi: Maillu Publishing House.
- —— (1983). Kaana ngy'a (in Kamba). Nairobi: Heinemann Educational Books.
- —— (1986). Benni Kamba 009 in Operation DXT. Nairobi: Heinemann Educational Books.
- —— (1987). Untouchable. Nairobi: Maillu Publishing House.
- —— (1988). Our kind of polygamy. Nairobi: Heinemann.
- —— (1988). Thorns of life. London: Macmillan.
- —— (1988). Pragmatic Leadership: Evaluation of Kenya's Cultural and Political Development. Featuring Daniel Arap Moi, President of Republic of Kenya. Nairobi: Maillu Publishing House.
- —— (1988). The poor child. Nairobi: Heinemann.
- —— (1989). Mbengo and the princess. Nairobi: Maillu Publishing House.
- —— (1989). The Principles of Nyayo Philosophy: Standard 7 and 8. Nairobi: Maillu Publishing House.
- —— (1989). The Black Adam and Eve. Nairobi: Maillu Publishing House.
- —— (1989). My Dear Mariana = Kumya ĩvu. Nairobi: Maillu Publishing House.
- —— (1989). Without Kiinua Mgongo. Nairobi: Maillu Publishing House.
- —— (1989). How to Look for the Right Boyfriend. Nairobi: Maillu Publishing House.
- —— (1990). The Ayah. Nairobi: Heinemann.
- —— (1990). Anayekukeep. Nairobi: Maillu Publishing House.
- —— (1991). P.O. Box I Love You: Via my Heart. Nairobi: Maillu Publishing House.
- —— (1991). Broken Drum. Nairobi: Jomo Kenyatta Foundation and Maillu Publishing House.
- —— (1992). The last hunter. Nairobi: Jomo Kenyatta Foundation and Maillu Publishing House.
- —— (1993). The Priceless Gift. Nairobi: East African Educational Publishers.
- —— (1994). Sasa and Sisi. Nairobi: Jomo Kenyatta Foundation and Maillu Publishing House.
- —— (1994). Dancing zebra. Nairobi: Jomo Kenyatta Foundation and Maillu Publishing House.
- —— (1996). The Orphan and his Goat Friend. Nairobi: Jomo Kenyatta Foundation and Maillu Publishing House.
- —— (1996). The Government's Daughter. Nairobi: Jomo Kenyatta Foundation and Maillu Publishing House.
- —— (1997). African Indigenous Political Ideology: Africa's Cultural Interpretation of Democracy. Nairobi: Maillu Publishing House.
- —— (1997). Maillu Revolution. Nairobi: Maillu Publishing House.
- —— (2001). Zawadi. Nairobi: Jomo Kenyatta Foundation and Maillu Publishing House.
- —— (2002). The Rainbow. Alexandria, VA: Alexander Street Press.
- —— (2002). The Survivors. Nairobi: Sasa Sema Publications.
- —— (2004). Sijui Kwetu Kamili (in Swahili). Dar es Salaam: MPB Enterprises.
- —— (2005). Julius Nyerere: Father of Ujamaa. Nairobi: Sasa Sema Publications.
- —— (2005). My Pen-Friend. Oxford: Macmillan.
- —— (2005). Ka: Holy Book of Neter. Nairobi: AfricanComb Books.
- —— (2005). Precious Blood. Nairobi: Phoenix Publishers.
- —— (2006). Kisa Cha Peremende (in Swahili). Nairobi: Moran Publishers.
- —— (2007). Kwame Nkrumah: Passionate Pan-Africanist. Nairobi: Sasa Sema Publications.
- —— (2007). Man from Machakos. Nairobi: Jomo Kenyatta Foundation and Maillu Publishing House.
- —— (2007). Behind the Presidential Motorcade: Maillu's Problems. Nairobi: Communal Democracy Party of Kenya.
- —— (2011). Mfalme Ndovu (in Swahili). Nairobi: Jomo Kenyatta Foundation and Maillu Publishing House.
- —— (2013). Atendaye Mema (in Swahili). Nairobi: Jomo Kenyatta Foundation and Maillu Publishing House.
- —— (2014). Mwanzo the Nairobian. Nairobi: Kenya Literature Bureau.
- —— (2016). "Popular Fiction Publishing in Africa: Does it Have a Place?". In Kamau, Kiarie; Mitambo, Kirimi (eds.). Coming of Age: Strides in African Publishing. Essays in Honour of Dr. Henry Chakava at 70. Nairobi: East African Educational Publishers. pp. 95–105.
- —— (2017). Kidnapped for Sale. Nairobi: Queenex Publishers.
- —— (2019). Black Madonna. Nairobi: Moran Publishers.
- —— (2021). Crossing the red line. Nairobi: Moran Publishers.

== Sources ==
- Apronti, E.O. (1980). "David G. Maillu and his Readers - an unusual poll of readers". The African Book Publishing Record. 6 (3–4): 219–224. doi:10.1515/abpr.1980.6.3-4.219. S2CID 154451809.
- Currey, James (2008). Africa Writes Back: The African Writers Series and the Launch of African Literature. Oxford: James Currey.
- Gikandi, Simon; Mwangi, Evan (2007). The Columbia guide to East African Literature in English since 1945. New York: Columbia University Press. ISBN 978-0-231-12520-8.
- Indangasi, Henry (1996). "David G. Maillu". In Lindfors, Bernth (ed.). Twentieth-century Caribbean and Black African writers. Third series. Gale. pp. 150–158. ISBN 978-0-8103-9352-3.
- Larson, Charles R. (1973). "Pop Pulp Goes Soft Core in Nairobi". The Journal of Popular Culture. 7: 606–611. doi:10.1111/j.0022-3840.1973.0703_606.x.
- Lindfors, Bernth (1979a). "Interview with David Maillu". The African Book Publishing Record. 5 (2): 81–93. doi:10.1515/abpr.1979.5.2.81.
- Lindfors, Bernth (1982). "The new David Maillu". Kunapipi. 4 (1): 130–143.
- Odhiambo, Tom (2008). "Kenyan Popular Fiction in English and the Melodramas of the Underdogs". Research in African Literatures. 39 (4): 72–82. doi:10.2979/RAL.2008.39.4.72. JSTOR 30135304. S2CID 145790417.
- Pugliese, Cristiana (1994). "Kenyan Publishers in Vernacular Languages: Gikuyu, Kikamba and Dholuo". Africa: Rivista trimestrale di studi e documentazione dell'Istituto italiano per l'Africa e l'Oriente. 49 (2): 250–259. ISSN 0001-9747. JSTOR 40760883.
- Schatzberg, Michael G. (1993). "Power, Legitimacy and 'Democratisation' in Africa". Journal of the International African Institute. 63 (4): 445–461. doi:10.2307/1161001. JSTOR 1161001. S2CID 146353951.
