= A Meeting In The Dark =

1974 story by Ngugi wa Thiong'o

A Meeting In the Dark (1974) is a short story written by Ngugi wa Thiong’o. A Kenyan playwright. The play is centered on John, the son of a christianized preacher. His dream is to further his education outside the country. His lover Wamuhu is pregnant. Out of anxiety and overwhelmed by the situation, he strangles her to death.

== Plot ==
The play is set in the Kikuyu community of Kenya. John is a very respected person in the community, as he is the son of the Christian village preacher. John is well educated and he also has his traditional community in mind, but he has dreams of furthering his education outside Kenya with the hope of a better future.

Months before his travel, his lover Wamuhu gets pregnant. As they are not married, the child would ruin his chances of going to university in Uganda.

He tries to persuade her not to inform her parents about it or tell them it's another person's child, but she disagrees, even when he offers her money. Desperate and out of anxiety, he strangles her till she dies. Only then does he realise that he just killed his lover and the unborn child.

== Characters ==
- John (the protagonist)
- Stanley (John's father, the preacher)
- Sussana (John's mother)
- Wamuhu (John's lover)
