= A Leopard Lives in a Muu Tree =

Poem by Jonathan Kariara

"A Leopard Lives in a Muu Tree" is a poem by the Kenyan poet Jonathan Kariara. It concerns a native farmer besieged by a tree-bound leopard that has apparently broken his fences, torn his medicine bags and stifled his wives' sensuality. Featured in such poesy anthologies as An Introduction to East African Poetry, The Penguin Book of Modern African Poetry and Over This Soil, it has been subjected to a wide range of interpretations. While the most obvious interpretation is erotic, the poem allegorizes the experience of exploitation by a colonial power.

The poem begins with the line that also constitutes its title, adding that the leopard's gaze is fixed on the home of the speaker, whose lambs(read children) are born with speckles and whose wives "tie their skirts tight / And turn away" (4-5), fearing that (presumably through the leopard's voracious attentions) they might spawn similarly stippled offspring. Nonetheless, while bathing late at night, "when the moon is high" (7), they make an exhibition of themselves, splashing the "cold mountain stream water on their nipples" (9), removing their skirts and imprecating loudly. Realizing that he is besieged and resolving to fell the Muu tree, the speaker walks about "stiff / Stroking my loins." (14-15)

From its residence outside his homestead, the leopard is seen eyeing the women. The speaker recalls addressing it as "elder" (18) and "one-from-the-same-womb" (18), but it holds its head high and merely peers at him "with slit eyes" (19). The speaker's sword has corroded in its sheath, and his wives, whenever the owls emit their mating call, do nothing but purse their lips. Again the speaker deplores his besieging.

Although the wives "fetch cold mountain water" (25) and "crush the sugar cane" (26), they decline to touch their husband's "beer horn" (27). With his fences broken, his medicine bags torn and the post at his gate fallen, the speaker's pubic hair is singed (burnt, charred). Presently, the leopard arches over the homestead, and the wives become frisky. The final two lines detail the former's lamb feast, which resuscitates it.

The speaker uses the imagery of a leopard to mean stealthy and dangerous, he goes further to suggest that they are of the same womb, from which we can infer that he speaks of a brother; older, and with more status than he. The persona's lambs are born with speckles, suggesting that the lecherous elder brother has already spawned children with the persona's wives; and, the persona has not had conjugal relations with them, as his elder visits upon his home frequently. This is suggested by the lines: "The upright post at the gate has fallen / My women are frisky / The leopard arches over my homestead".

== Bibliography ==
- Moore, Gerald, and Ulli Beier. The Penguin Book of Modern African Poetry. Harmondsworth: Penguin, 1984.
- Killam, G. D. The Writing of East and Central Africa. East African Publishers, 1984. ISBN 978-0-435-91671-8
