= Rebeka Njau =

Kenyan educator, writer and textile artist (born 1932)

Rebeka Njaū
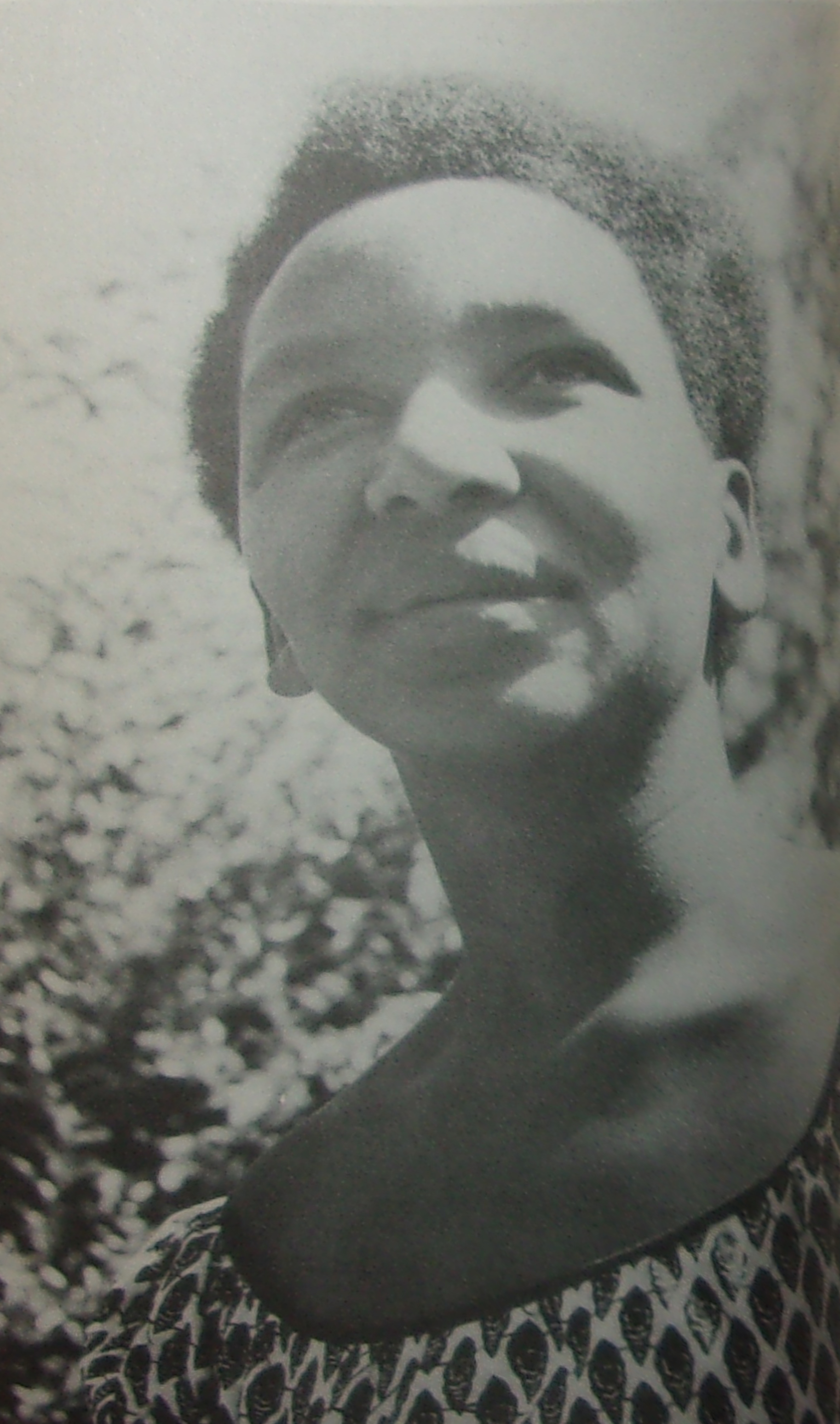
- Njau in 1965
- Born: Rebeka Nyanjega; 15 December 1932 (age 93); Kanyariri, Kiambu County, Kenya
- Education: Alliance Girls High School; Makerere University College
- Occupations: Writer and educator
- Spouse: Elimo Njau (separated 1983)
- Relatives: Binyavanga Wainaina (nephew)
- Writing career
- Pen name: Rebecca Njau; Marina GasheE
- Notable works: The Scar (1963); Ripples in the Pool (1975); The Sacred Seed (2003)

Rebeka Njaū (née Nyanjega; born 15 December 1932) is a Kenya educator and writer, who was Kenya's first female playwright and a pioneer in the representation of African women in literature. Her writing has addressed topics such as female genital mutilation and homosexuality. Her first novel, Ripples in the Pool (1975), appeared as number 203 in the Heinemann African Writers Series.

Her earliest works were published under the name "Rebecca Njaū", and she also used the pseudonym "Marina Gashe".

== Biography ==
=== Early life ===
Rebeka Njaū was born in 1932 in the village of Kanyariri, in Kiambu County to the northwest of Nairobi. Her family was Christian and she recalled the division this created with those around them:

It was interesting for us, especially in our home, because we were surrounded by people [that] we would call primitive. They circumcised their girls. In our home my parents were Christians. It's like we lived in two countries because we were separated by traditions. We had nothing to do with one another.

Her mother's stance against female genital mutilation bought her into contact with the Mau Mau:

She was such a brave woman and [the] Mau Mau wanted to kill her. They changed [eventually]—I don't know why. They came to kill her but then on second thought, just before they neared our home, they went back.

=== Education and career ===
Njaū was one of only 14 girls admitted to Alliance Girls High School in its inaugural year, before attending Makerere University College in Kampala. While at Makerere, she attended the 1962 African Writers Conference.

She returned to Kenya after graduation to teach at Alliance, before co-founding Nairobi Girls School in 1964. She married Elimo Njaū, an artist from Tanzania. Njaū's teaching career came to an end in 1968, and she and her husband then became increasingly involved with the Paa Ya Paa Gallery in Nairobi, before going on to edit Target, the magazine of the National Council of Churches of Kenya. Njaū separated from husband in 1983, and she published her memoirs, Mirrors of My Life, in 2019.

Her son, Morille Njaū, is an artist and a consultant based in the UK and her daughter Hana Njaū-Okolo is a poet, and published author who lives and works in Atlanta, Georgia. Her nephew was the author Binyavanga Wainaina.

The Scar, 1965

=== The Scar (1963) ===
The Scar, a one-act play, is considered the first play written by a Kenyan woman when it appeared in Transition journal in March 1963. It was republished in 1965 by Kibo Art Gallery in Marangu, which was run by Elimo Njaū.

The Scar premiered at the Uganda National Theatre in 1963 and went on to be performed in Kenya, Ghana, Tanzania and the USA. The play centres on the issue of female genital mutilation. The main character is Mariana, a former prostitute who tries to help girls escape female genital mutilation, which she regards as a "brutal custom". She advocates for alternative forms of initiation that can empower girls. Mariana is opposed by other women, who claim to be acting on behalf of the community's elders. The play ends with Mariana being shamed for having an illegitimate child and losing her status.

In 1964, a second play by Njaū, In the Round Chain, was performed before being banned by the Ugandan government.

Ripples in the Pool, 1975

=== Ripples in the Pool (1975) ===
In 1964, Njaū won a prize in an East African novel competition with her manuscript Alone with the Fig Tree. Following substantial revisions, it was published as Ripples in the Pool by TransAfrica Press in 1975. TransAfrica went bankrupt shortly afterwards, and Njaū contacted Henry Chakava, editor of Heinemann Educational Books East Africa, to see if the novel could be republished. A subedited edition appeared in the African Writers Series in 1978.

The novel tells the story of Selina, a prostitute living in the city who is a modern, independent woman. She decides to marry her younger lover, Gìkere, and they move to his village. Selina miscarries and Gìkere's mother, who already had little respect for her, calls her "an infertile witch". Gìkere responds by trying to assert authority in the relationship by beating Selina. As she becomes more isolated, Selina turns her sexual desires towards Gìkere's younger sister, Gacirū. She experiences a mental breakdown and tries to hang herself, before strangling Gacirū in her sleep. The novel ends with Selina as a "stray woman" wandering the countryside.

At least one reviewer was left confused by the rapid shifts in plot and point of view, but writing in 1982 Frank Birbalsingh concludes:

"...it is clear that Njaū is continuing the tradition of social realism, established in the modern African novel by Achebe's Things Fall Apart, updated by Armah's The Beautyful Ones are not yet Born, and made politically significant in the most recent writings of Ngugi wa Thiong'o."

Ripples in the Pool is considered the first Kenyan novel, and for many the first African novel, to both portray lesbian relationships and treat lesbianism sensitively. The author reported that readers believed that it "wasn't her" because of its subject matter.

The Sacred Seed, 2003

=== The Sacred Seed (2003) ===
Njaū's second novel was published in 2003. The Sacred Seed is described by Alex Wanjala as a quasi-autobiographical novel that brings together elements of social realism and the supernatural. He views the novel as Njaū's attempt to expose the malaise in contemporary Kenyan society and its roots in patriarchal relations that stem from both the pre-colonial and colonial periods.

In the words of The Daily Nation, the author "delves into the minds of her characters to reveal the psychological wounds they have suffered under patriarchy and dictatorship and their determination to heal the society. ... The narrator presents the destruction of the resourcefulness of women in the traditional African societies by modern regimes and points to ways women's power can be restored through the demolition of class hierarchies."

=== Other works ===
Njaū, under the pseudonym Marina Gashe, published a poem entitled "The Village", in 1963.

In 1964, she published a short story called "Muma" in Présence Africaine 50, although there is confusion over authorship.

She is also the author of The Hypocrite and other Stories (1977), a reworking of traditional oral narratives, and of Kenya Women Heroes and their Mystical Power (1984), which records the overlooked historical contribution of women. Njau is included in the anthology Daughters of Africa (ed. Margaret Busby, 1992).

== Critical reception ==
Alex Wanjala has said: "Like Grace Ogot, Rebeka Njaū is a very important writer in Kenya.... She addresses issues that affect women directly and then demonstrates how women's issues are symptomatic of a malaise in the larger Kenyan society." According to John Mugubi of Kenyatta University, "The uniqueness and power of Rebeka's style cannot be understated. She has a penchant for subversion of literary conventions in order to drive points home."

== Bibliography ==
=== Novels ===
- Ripples in the Pool (TransAfrica Press, 1975; republished by Heinemann in 1978 as number 203 in the Heinemann African Writers Series; translated into Dutch as Rimpels in de poel by Joke Schretlen and published by Dekker, 1988). Extracted in Daughters of Africa, edited by Margaret Busby, London: Jonathan Cape, 1992
- The Sacred Seed (Books Horizon, 2003)

=== Short stories ===
- "Muma"" (included in Présence Africaine 50, 1964)
- Vine in the Church-Yard" (Literary Review 34, 1991)

=== Poems ===
- "The Village" (credited as Mrs Elimo Njaū in Poems from Black Africa, edited by Langston Hughes, 1963; credited as Marina Gashe in The Heinemann book of African Women's Poetry, 1995)

=== Short-story collections ===
- The Hypocrite and other stories (Uzima, 1977)

=== Plays ===
- The Scar: A Tragedy in One Act (Transition, 1963; republished by Kibo Art Gallery in 1965; Books Horizon, 2019)
- In the Round Chain (unpublished, 1964)

=== Memoirs ===
- Mirrors of my Life (Books Horizon, 2019)

=== Other non-fiction ===
- Kenya Women Heroes and their Mystical Power (with Gideon Mulaki; Risk Publications, 1984)
