= Secure the Base =

2016 non-fiction book by Ngũgĩ wa Thiong'o

Secure the Base: Making Africa Visible in the Globe
- Author: Ngũgĩ wa Thiong'o
- Language: English
- Genre: Non-fiction
- Publisher: Seagull Books
- Publication date: 15 February 2016
- Publication place: Nigeria
- ISBN: 0-857-42313-4

Secure the Base: Making Africa Visible in the Globe is a 2016 book by Kenyan author Ngũgĩ wa Thiong'o. The book addresses the issues of Africa's historical relationship with capitalism, the impact of slavery and colonialism, and the role of African intellectuals in fostering social change. He critiques the reductionist portrayal of African conflicts, advocates for the recognition of historical injustices, and calls for the use of African languages in building the continent, Africa. Secure The Base discusses global issues of economic inequality and nuclear disarmament, calling for united African leadership and a more equitable global order.

== Synopsis ==
Ngũgĩ wa Thiong'o focuses on the repercussions of both external and internal injustices inflicted upon African people. While emphasizing the significant impact of crimes imposed by external forces, particularly Africa's historical ties with the Western world, he sheds light on internal challenges of the continent. He critically examines the language and narratives surrounding African conflicts, particularly tribes and its derivatives. In the book, he argues that these terms, rooted in a biological perspective, oversimplify complex issues and contribute to another understanding of the African societies. To him, by focusing solely on these divisions, such as ethnicity or tribal identity, without considering the historical context and socio-economic disparities imposed by colonialism, these conflicts are termed unsolvable. While he highlights the colonial legacy ending up in dividing communal identities and fostering uneven development within Africa, he analyses such conflicts exist in other parts of the world, which are limited to tribalism.

The second essay of the book was on Africa's historical interaction with capitalism. From the commodification of African bodies during the era of slavery to the exploitation of unpaid labor on slave plantations, he thus concluded Africa has long been subjected to economic exploitation. During the colonial period, he argued that Africa served primarily as the land source of raw materials, and the Europeans buying from them now is the vice versa. European powers further perpetuated the economic subjugation. However, his argument included the wave of decolonization after the World War II. He analysed that many African countries ventured into financial houses such as the World Bank or the IMF instead of achieving true independence.

Ngũgĩ's analysis underscores the enduring legacy of colonialism and the persistent challenges that African nations face in asserting their economic sovereignty. By contextualizing Africa's economic struggles within a historical framework, he sheds light on the systemic inequalities and injustices that continue to shape the continent's development trajectory.

As Kingsley Moghalu cautiously questions the narrative of Africa as a frontier for capitalism, Ngũgĩ advocates for a united African leadership to foster more equitable global interactions.
