= The Perfect Nine: The Epic of Gĩkũyũ and Mũmbi =

2020 book by Ngũgĩ wa Thiong'o

- Author: Ngugi wa Thiong’o
- Language: Gikuyu
- Genre: Epic poetry
- Publisher: Harvill Secker
- Publication date: 2020
- Publication place: Kenya

The Perfect Nine: The Epic of Gĩkũyũ and Mũmbi is a Gikuyu book-length prose poem by the Kenyan author and playwright Ngũgĩ wa Thiong'o, published in 2020. The work is a retelling of the Gikuyu creation myth, using a combination of Homeric verse with oral storytelling techniques such as choruses, chants, songs. It became the first book originally written in an indigenous African language to be longlisted for the International Booker Prize in 2021, when Ngugi summarized it by saying: "It is a celebration of feminist creative power and glory."

== Plot ==
After escaping starvation and conflict, Gikuyu and Mumbi make their home at the base of Mount Kenya. "The Perfect Nine" are their daughters, renowned for their beauty; when ninety-nine suitors show up on their estate, the parents advise their girls to make their own decisions, but to make informed ones.

Before doing so, the young women – accompanied by the suitors – go off on a quest to locate a cure for their youngest sister Warigia, who is paralyzed. The Perfect Nine must overcome fear, doubt, hunger, and numerous dangerous ogres.

== Reception ==
A review in the journal World Literature Today described The Perfect Nine as a "triumph" and praised the dreamlike and timeless quality of the poetry, additionally noting: "Ngũgĩ retells this epic story from a strongly feminist perspective, with the Perfect Nine being the heroines of their own legend."

The Perfect Nine was nominated for the International Booker Prize in 2021, making Thiong'o the first individual to be nominated both as author and translator. It is also the first nominated book to have been written in an indigenous African language.
