= The Black Hermit =

1963 play written by Ngũgĩ wa Thiong'o

The Black Hermit was the first play by the Kenyan author Ngũgĩ wa Thiongʼo, and the first published East African play in English. The travelling theatre of Makerere College was the first to produce the play, putting it on in honour of Ugandan independence at the Ugandan National Theatre in Kampala in November 1962. The play was published in a small edition by Makerere University Press in 1963, and republished in the Heinemann African Writers Series in 1968.

== Plot ==
The Black Hermit is the story of a young man, Remi, who is the first of his tribe to attend university. Amidst the backdrop of a politically torn country, Remi himself is torn between his sense of tribalism and nationalism. This struggle runs deep, as he finds it at the heart of his afflictions between himself, his marriage and familial relations, and his greater sense of obligations to his people and the country. The overwhelming nature of these problems drives him into isolation as a black hermit. His self-imposed exile into the city leads him to find contentment in Jane, his new lover, and nightly clubbing. However, after he is lobbied to return to the tribe, he must now confront the demons of his past.

=== Act 1 ===
Scene 1 The play opens with Remi's wife and mother, Thoni and Nyobi, respectively, carrying out household chores. A conversation is struck as both admit to suffering from the absence of their beloved Remi. Thoni's distress is caused by her lack of fulfillment of motherly and womanly obligations to her tribe. Nyobi seeks to comfort her daughter-in-law, directing her to escape her sorrow: "I hate to see your youth wearing away, falling into bits like a cloth hung in the sun." [quote].

A knock at the door distracts them only to reveal the presence of one of the tribe's elders. A premonition had occurred in the village messenger, an oracle, that the strength and bounty of the village would return should the green seed, Remi, along with his university education, be planted. The elder, on behalf of the other elders, approaches Nyobi asking for her blessing in the plan to bring Remi back to the tribe. She obliges the messenger and mission her blessing but seeks out the power of Christ to return her son.

Scene 2

The elders of the tribe are congregating to discuss the plight of the tribe. Uhuru, or freedom, was promised yet not delivered by the Africanist Party and their neighbours who they conceive to be aspiring against them are surely to be blamed for their misfortune. Their salvation would be in Remi, the prodigal, educated son of the tribe, would lead their tribe back to strength and influence; therefore, the leader along with additional elders, along with Nyobi's blessing, elect to travel to the city.

Scene 3

Nyobi fears the elder's efforts will not work without divine intervention from the God of Christ. She visits the tribe's priest for spiritual guidance and comfort, not only for herself but for her daughter-in-law, Thoni, whose demeanour is affected by Remi's absence. She doubts the tribe's elders will be effective in returning him, so after the priest offers her words of comfort, she pleads the case for him to travel to the city and convince Remi to return. He obliges.

=== Act 2 ===
Scene 1

Over the last few weeks, Remi has become increasingly mindful of home. Jane, his long time lover since moving to the city, has noticed this and addressed him about it. His thoughts and concerns are with his mother, so much so that he has become distant from Jane and negligent in remembering their plans. Jane wants for Remi to open up about his past, even suggesting that the two should visit his home. Nevertheless, he evades her inquiries, and the two depart to a night club.

Scene 2

Remi then gets a surprise visit from a long-time friend and colleague, Omange. The two engage in an impassioned debate about social issues in the country. At a glance, it appears to be of the typical matters. race relations, politics and regime transitions, tribalism versus nationalism, etc., are all brought up. Yet, things take a turn, as Remi discusses his politically active past at his university and in his tribe.

He goes on to reveal that his childhood crush, who was to be married to his brother, was left widowed following his brother's accidental death, and that under tribal custom, he was to marry her. This was his reason for leaving, as surely she could not have loved him, and, given his political ideology, he could not agree with following tribal law.

Just as Omange suggests that Remi return home to reconcile this grievance, the elders enter; Remi requests of Omange to depart and to prevent Jane from entering. The elders lobby Remi regarding the same manner, his return to the tribe. However, they desire of him to lead them politically and to be the liaison between them and the government. Remi grows agitated, as the same tribalistic passions he once escaped have followed him. He sends them off, as he vaguely fails to agree or disagree with their demand.

Their departure is followed shortly by the arrival of the tribe's Christian Priest. Shockingly, he too arrives to ask for Remi's return. This time, he approaches the task from a religious and emotional perspective: "God needs you... Your mother needs you." Finally, after this emotional lobby, Remi agrees to return. He comes to the realization that up until now he has been a hermit, hiding from his conflictions.

Scene 3

Days pass and the date of departure draws near. For obvious reasons, Jane is upset that he is leaving and begs him to let her join him. He provides the reasoning that their cultural differences would not permit her to function within the tribe. Further interrogation reveals that Remi's true reasoning for denying her the trip, and the reason for his coming to the city: his tribal marriage. She becomes distraught and leaves him.

=== Act 3 ===
Scene 1

The day has now come when Remi is to return. While Nyobi is filled with excitement, Thoni have fear in her heart. Premonitions and dreams fill her mind with symbols that signal to her a less than harmonious return of her beloved. Comforting by both Nyobi and the Pastor prove ineffective, and upon the arrival of Remi, her feelings are proved true. In his return, he detests the tribalistic urges pushed by the elders and rejects the efforts of both his mother and the Pastor to reunite with his wife.

Scene 2

Filled deeply with sorrow, Thoni attempts to escape the village. Her destiny is to be exiled to the country of darkness – a place she has visited before – of where she will be free of the pain she experiences. A local woman petitions her to abandon the voyage and return to the tribe. Her efforts are to no avail, however, as Thoni disappears.

Scene 3

Remi remains blinded to Thoni's love until the delivery of her letter, where she pours out her heart. This news transforms his demeanour instantaneously, as he rushes to his house in pursuit of her. He finds nothing but Nyobi and the pastor. Nyobi unaffectionately brushes his concerns until she acknowledges the sincerity of them, which causes her to attitude to shift. Nevertheless, all parties become disheartened at the return of Thoni's corpse to the house. Remi is left in pain and sorrow at the sight of his deceased wife as the play concludes.

== Structure and genre ==
This work is an African genre and play, and also a tragedy.

== Themes and concepts ==
Multiple themes reoccur throughout the play and factor into the plot and character development. One of the main themes involves the pull between Nationalism and Tribalism that exists in the Post-Colonial country. We see these two varying attitudes on political life expressing themselves in how Remi and the elders in his tribe seek to address the tribe's issues. This can be seen directly in Scene three of Act three where Remi and his friend, Omange, agree that to deal with tribalism with ruthless vigour is a part of the solution.

== Origins ==
The nature of this work's origin is unclear, being that it was written in one of Ngugi's early years. However, it is believed that the chief of his influences for writing The Black Hermit is his personal experience of regime change following independence from a colonizer. In the words of James Ogude: "In the early 1960s, when Ngugi was writing, the relationship between ethnicity and nationalism was clearly a vexed one."

== Publishing history ==
The Black Hermit was the first play by Kenyan author Ngũgĩ wa Thiongʼo, and the first published East African play in English. The travelling theatre of Makerere College were the first to produce the play, putting it on in honour of Ugandan independence at the Ugandan National Theatre in Kampala in November 1962. The play was published in a small edition by Makerere University Press in 1963, and republished in Heinemann's African Writers Series in 1968.

=== Translations ===
Ngugi originally produced this work in English. Later on, however, a change in perspective of writing in English rather than his native tongues drove him to print the work in Swahili and Giyuku. Today, the work is published in more than thirty languages.
