= Weep Not, Child =

1964 debut novel by Ngũgĩ wa Thiong'o

- Cover of the first edition, published in 1965
- Author: James Ngugi (Ngũgĩ wa Thiong'o)
- Language: English
- Genre: Historical novel
- Publisher: Heinemann
- Publication date: 1964; 62 years ago
- Publication place: Kenya
- Media type: Print (hardback & paperback)
- Pages: 144
- ISBN: 0435908308
- Preceded by: The Black Hermit (play)
- Followed by: The River Between

Weep Not, Child is the 1964 debut novel by Kenyan author Ngũgĩ wa Thiong'o. It was published in 1964 under the name James Ngugi. It was in the African Writers Series of the Heinemann publishing company. Weep Not, Child was the first English-language novel by an East African to be published. Thiong'o's works deal with the relationship between Africans and white settlers in colonial Kenya, and are heavily critical of colonial rule. Specifically, Weep Not, Child deals with the Mau Mau Uprising, and "the bewildering dispossession of an entire people from their ancestral land." Ngũgĩ wrote the novel while he was a student at Makerere University in Uganda.

The novel is divided into two parts and eighteen chapters. Part one deals mostly with the education of Njoroge, while part two deals with the rising Mau Mau movement.

== Plot summary ==
Njoroge, a little boy, is urged to attend school by his mother. He is the first one of his family able to go to school. His family lives on the land of Jacobo, an African made rich by his dealings with white settlers, namely Mr. Howlands, the most powerful land owner in the area. Njoroge's brother Kamau works as an apprentice to a carpenter, while Boro, the eldest living son, is troubled by his experiences while in forced service during World War II, including witnessing the death of his elder brother. Ngotho, Njoroge's father and a respected man in the surrounding area, tends Mr. Howlands' crops, but is motivated by his passion to preserve his ancestral land, rather than for any compensation or loyalty.

One day, black workers call for a strike to obtain higher wages. Ngotho is ambivalent about participating in the strike because he fears he will lose his job. However, he decides to go to the gathering, even though his two wives do not agree. At the demonstration, there are calls for higher wages. Suddenly, the white police inspector brings Jacobo to the gathering to pacify the native people. Jacobo tries to put an end to the strike. Ngotho attacks Jacobo, and the result is a riot where two people are killed. Jacobo survives and swears revenge. Ngotho loses his job and Njoroge's family is forced to move. Njoroge's brothers fund his education and seem to lose respect for their father.

Mwihaki, Jacobo's daughter and Njoroge's best friend, enters a girls' only boarding school, leaving Njoroge relatively alone. He reflects upon her leaving, and realizes that he was embarrassed by his father's actions towards Jacobo. For this reason, Njoroge is not upset by her exit and their separation. Njoroge switches to another school.

For a time, everyone's attention is focused on the upcoming trial of Jomo Kenyatta – a revered leader of the movement. Many blacks think that he is going to bring forth Kenya's independence. But Jomo loses the trial and is imprisoned. This results in further protests and greater suppression of the black population.

Jacobo and a white landowner, Mr. Howlands, fight against the rising activities of the Mau Mau, an organization striving for Kenyan economic, political, and cultural independence. Jacobo accuses Ngotho of being the leader of the Mau Mau and tries to imprison the whole family. Meanwhile, the situation in the country is deteriorating. Six black men are taken out of their houses and executed in the woods.

One day Njoroge meets Mwihaki again, who has returned from boarding school. Although Njoroge had planned to avoid her due to the conflict between their fathers, their friendship is unaffected. Njoroge passes an important exam that allows him to advance to High School. His village is proud of him, and collects money to pay Njoroge's High School tuition.

Several months later, Jacobo is murdered in his office by a member of the Mau Mau. Mr. Howlands has Njoroge removed from school for questioning. Both father and son are brutally beaten before release and Ngotho is left barely alive. Although there doesn't seem to be a connection between Njoroge's family and the murder, it is eventually revealed that Njoroge's brothers are behind the assassination, and that Boro is the real leader of the Mau Mau. Ngotho soon dies from his injuries and Njoroge finds out that his father was protecting his brothers. Kamau has been imprisoned for life. Only Njoroge and his two mothers remain free, and Njoroge is left as the sole provider of his two mothers. Njoroge fears that he cannot make ends meet; he gives up hope of continuing in school and loses faith in God.

Njoroge asks Mwihaki's for support, but she is angry because of her father's death. When he finally pledges his love to her, she refuses to leave with him, realizing her obligation to Kenya and her mother. Njoroge decides to leave town and makes an attempt at suicide; however, he fails when his mothers find him before he is able to hang himself. The novel closes with Njoroge feeling hopeless, and ashamed of cowardice.

== Characters in Weep Not, Child ==
- Njoroge: the main character of the book, whose main goal throughout the story is to become as educated as possible.
- Ngotho: Njoroge's father. He works for Mr. Howlands and is respected by him until he attacks Jacobo at a workers strike. He is fired and the family is forced to move to another section of the country. Over the course of the book, his position as the central power of the family weakened, to the point where his self-realization that he has spent his whole life waiting for the prophecy (that proclaims the blacks will be returned their land) to come true rather than fighting for Kenyan independence, leads to his depression.
- Nyokabi and Njeri: the two wives of Ngotho. Njeri is Ngotho's first wife, and mother of Boro, Kamau, and Kori. Nyokabi is his second wife, and the mother of Njoroge and Mwangi.
- Njoroge has four brothers: Boro, Kamau, Kori and Mwangi (who is Njoroge's only full brother, who died in World War II).
- Boro: Son of Njeri, who fights for the Allies in World War II. Upon returning, his anger against the colonial government is compounded by their confiscation of his land. Boro's anger and position as eldest son leads him to question and ridicule Ngotho, which eventually defeats their father's will (upon realizing his life was wasted waiting and not acting). It is eventually revealed that Boro is the leader of the Mau Mau (earlier alluded to as "entering politics") and murders Mr. Howlands. He is caught by police immediately after and is scheduled to be executed by the book's end. It is highly likely that it is also Boro who kills Jacobo.
- Mwihaki: Njoroge's best friend (who later develops into his love interest), daughter of Jacobo. When it is revealed that his family killed Jacobo (most likely Boro), Mwihaki distances herself from Njoroge, asking for time to mourn her father and care for her mother.
- Jacobo: Mwihaki's father and an important landowner. Chief of the village.
- Mr. Howlands: A white settler, who emigrated to colonial Kenya and now owns a farm made up of land that originally belonged to Ngotho's ancestors. Has three children: Peter who died in World War II before the book's beginning, a daughter who becomes a missionary, and Stephen who met Njoroge while the two were in high school.

== Themes and motifs ==
Weep Not, Child integrates Gikuyu mythology and the ideology of nationalism that serves as catalyst for much of the novel's action. The novel explores the negative aspects of colonial rule over Kenya. Njoroge's aspiration to attend university is frustrated by both the violence of the Mau Mau rebels and the violent response of the colonial government. This disappointment leads to his alienation from his family and ultimately his suicide attempt.

The novel also ponders the role of saviours and salvation. The author notes in his 1965 novel The River Between: "Salvation shall come from the hills. From the blood that flows in me, I say from the same tree, a son shall rise. And his duty shall be to lead and save the people." Jomo Kenyatta, the first prime minister of Kenya, is immortalised in Weep Not, Child. The author says, "Jomo had been his (Ngotho's) hope. Ngotho had come to think that it was Jomo who would drive away the white man. To him, Jomo stood for custom and traditions purified by grace of learning and much travel." Njoroge comes to view Jomo as a messiah who will win the struggle against the colonial government.

== See also ==
- Things Fall Apart
- Death and the King's Horseman
