= Kikuyu Home Guard =

Former Kenyan paramilitary force

The Kikuyu Home Guard (also Home Guard or Kikuyu Guard) was a government paramilitary force in Kenya from early 1953 until January 1955. It was formed in response to insurgent attacks during the Mau Mau Uprising.

== History ==
The Kikuyu Home Guard was named after the British Home Guard from World War II. The Kikuyu Guard was formed from several hundred Tribal Police and the private armies created by loyalist leaders in the wake of Mau Mau attacks. Clayton calls these early, ad hoc anti-Mau Mau groups the Kikuyu Resistance Groups, which appeared in the last part of 1952. Its creation was an extremely divisive development within Kikuyu society.

Its divisive nature was ensured by Sir Evelyn Baring's government's tentative desire to give the Home Guard the appearance of being a Kikuyu-led initiative. Officially sanctioned by the colonial government, at its peak, in 1954, the Home Guard numbered more than 25,000 men—more than the number of Mau Mau fighters in the reserves. Many joined voluntarily for a variety of reasons, but particularly once the battle had begun to shift decisively against Mau Mau by late 1954; however, in some districts, up to 30% of Home Guard members were press-ganged.

Major-General Sir William Hinde put the Home Guard under command of European district officers—these district officers were not trained military personnel, but rather settlers or career, often quite junior, colonial-officers. Hinde recruited Colonel Philip Morcombe to head up the Home Guard. Once set up, it began working alongside the British military. Within a month of the Lari massacre, 20% of the Home Guard were armed with shotguns and given a uniform, and eventually nearly all of them would be supplied with precision weapons of some kind and uniformed.

By 1955, the majority of the Guard were stood down, since Mau Mau no longer constituted a major threat, and the remainder of the guard were absorbed into the Tribal Police.

== Organisation ==
As noted above, the Guard was organised by the Kenya Administration, rather than the Army or Police, and Temporary District Officers were appointed to officer the guard. In most cases, individual platoons and sections of the Guard were officered by junior administration officials, such as chiefs and headmen.

== Role ==
The Guard undertook a variety of mission roles. For the majority of the time, they guarded the concentration camps set up by the British Colonial Administration to prevent the Mau Mau from getting food and other supplies from the Kikuyu People forced to live in the camps. In the early period of the Guard, it was common for the Mau Mau to overrun these fortified positions because the Guard lacked sufficient firepower to resist their attackers. In due course, as the Guard demonstrated its political and military reliability, the Kenya Government supplied shotguns and rifles to the Guard.

The Guard also took part in anti-Mau Mau sweeps and local patrolling. Their local knowledge and intimate understanding of the Mau Mau made them very effective in this role. It is estimated that the Tribal Police and the Home Guard were responsible for some 42% of all Mau Mau deaths, making them the most effective branch of the Kenya security forces.

The Tribal Police / Home Guard was behind the capture of the head of the Mau Mau, Dedan Kimathi.

== Bibliography ==
- Anderson, David (2005). Histories of the Hanged: The Dirty War in Kenya and the End of Empire. London: Weidenfeld and Nicolson. ISBN 0-393-05986-3.
- Branch, Daniel (2007). "The Enemy Within: Loyalists and the War Against Mau Mau in Kenya" (PDF). The Journal of African History. 48 (2). Cambridge University Press: 291–315. doi:10.1017/S0021853707002812. hdl:10036/30200. S2CID 145734278.
- Clayton, Anthony (1976). Counter-Insurgency in Kenya, 1952–60: A Study of Military Operations against Mau Mau. Nairobi: Transafrica.
- Elkins, Caroline (2005). Britain's Gulag: The Brutal End of Empire in Kenya. London: Pimlico. ISBN 1-84413-548-9.
- Majdalany, Fred (1962). State of Emergency (First ed.). London: Longmans.
- Pinney, John (1957). David Lovatt Smith (ed.). A History of the Kikuyu Guard (2003 ed.). Fort Hall: privately published. ISBN 0-9544713-1-8.
