= The River Between =

1965 novel by Ngũgĩ wa Thiong'o

- First edition
- Author: Ngũgĩ wa Thiong'o
- Language: English
- Publisher: Heinemann – African Writers Series
- Publication date: 1965
- Publication place: Kenya
- Media type: Print Paperback
- Preceded by: Weep Not, Child
- Followed by: A Grain of Wheat

The River Between is a 1965 novel by Kenyan author Ngũgĩ wa Thiong'o that was published as part of the influential Heinemann African Writers Series. It tells the story of the separation of two neighbouring villages of Kenya caused by differences in faith set in the decades of roughly the early 20th century. The bitterness between them caused much hatred between the adults of each side. The story tells about the struggle of a young leader, Waiyaki, to unite the two villages of Kameno and Makuyu through sacrifice and pain.

The novel is set during the colonial period, when white settlers arrived in Kenya's "White Highlands", and has a mountain setting.

== Plot summary ==
A young man called Waiyaki is the focal point in Ngugi's story. At an early age, Waiyaki was already considered to have special gifts. He once encountered two boys fighting and attempted to break up the squabble. Although he was the youngest of the three, he managed to stop to the violence. Ngugi reveals that the three boys, Waiyaki, Kamau and Kinuthia, are destined to study at a local mission school nearby and, from there, to become teachers. Waiyaki is eventually enrolled at the school at the behest of his father, Chege. He explains to young Waiyaki the legend of a savior who would be born into their village and accomplish great things for his people. Waiyaki's father believes that he is that savior. Although Waiyaki is skeptical of such a fantastical prophesy, he excels in the school and is well on his way to playing a vital role in the development of his people. The significance of Chege's eagerness to send Waiyaki to the mission school rests on the fact that the boy would be in a position to learn the wisdom of the colonists. This knowledge would equip Waiyaki for the struggle against the colonial government. Despite the liberating potential of this knowledge, Waiyaki must ensure he does not embrace the colonial system, as doing so would defeat the purpose of his training.

As the story progresses, the division between the two villages intensifies, and the proposed circumcision of the young girl Muthoni causes much dissent within the community. Her death galvanizes the missionary school—in which Waiyaki is enrolled—into action, going so far as to expel children whose parents still uphold the tradition of circumcision. Waiyaki is among those forced from the school. In response, he decides to take up the challenge of building a school for the expelled children. While he still does not fully understand the leadership role his father predicted he would take up, he begins to realize that his mission is to enable education for the children of the villages. He becomes so preoccupied with this goal that he fails to recognize and address the other needs of his community, such as reclaiming lands seized by the colonists. Some villagers begin conspiring behind closed doors, eventually forming a secret organization known as Kiama, whose singular purpose is to ensure the purity of the tribe.

As a result of this upheaval, Waiyaki makes enemies. Among them is Kabonyi, who begins to provoke dissenters in the community to undermine and destroy Waiyaki. Eventually, Waiyaki succumbs to Kabonyi's trickery. While he desires nothing more than to quell the growing unrest within the village and heal the angst among the people, he is powerless to undo the polarizing effects of colonialism. Waiyaki blames himself for having failed to address the lack of unity in time.

The story concludes on an ominous note. Waiyaki and his new love interest Nyambura find themselves in the hands of the Kiama who would then decide their fate. What happens beyond that remains a mystery.

== Characters ==
- Waiyaki: an ambitious young man who tries to save his people from the white man by building schools and providing education.
- Chege: Waiyaki's father. He is a well-respected elder of his tribe, presiding over a range of ceremonies. He also knows all the prophecies, including the invasion of the white people with their clothes like butterflies, and a savior rising to face this threat.
- Joshua: father of Muthoni and Nyambura, he represents the influence of the white man and is one of Waiyaki's antagonists. He was one of the first people to be converted to Christianity, seeking refuge in Siriana because he feared the revenge and anger of his people, who felt betrayed. He becomes increasingly zealous, renouncing his tribe's rituals and traditions. Considering his people to live in darkness, he is dedicated to converting as many people as possible to save them from hell.
- Muthoni: she is Joshua's younger daughter; instead of following the Christian way of life, she follows the traditional path and chooses to get circumcised to become a woman. However, the circumcision leads to medical complications, and even though Waiyaki managed to get her to a hospital, she dies after claiming that she sees Jesus.
- Nyambura: Muthoni's older sister, but not as revolutionary because she is not as independent. While Muthoni openly rebels against her father, Nyambura follows him because she fears his anger. She falls in love with Waiyaki and starts a secret affair, which leads to his downfall, as their relationship is considered a treason among the council.
- Kabonyi: He is the father of Kamau. He represents the council of the elders and therefore the conservative forces within the community. He detests Waiyaki due to conflicting ideologies and the fear that Waiyaki may be the one sent to save the people. Eventually, however, Kabonyi is able to punish Waiyaki during a council meeting, effectively ending the struggle for reconciliation.
- Kinuthia: A close and loyal friend of Waiyaki's and a teacher at Marioshoni. Kinuthia loves Waiyaki and thinks he is a great leader, but he often warns his friend of imminent trouble. At Waiyaki's final stand, he is nearly crippled with fear and foreboding; he can say nothing to dissuade the Kiama from punishment.
- Kamau: Kabonyi's son and peer of Waiyaki; he is a teacher at Marioshoni. Kamau is extremely jealous of Waiyaki, especially when he realizes Nyambura loves Waiyaki. He works with his father to topple Waiyaki from his perch of power.
- Livingstone: A Protestant missionary who founds Siriana and carries on a more than twenty-five-year outreach in the ridges. He is devoted to getting rid of circumcision, which he considers to be a barbaric practice.
- Miriamu: Joshua's wife and mother to Muthoni and Nyambura. She is a devout Christian, but she still has a Gikuyu spirit inside. She loves her daughters and weeps for their sorrows, but she believes that they must obey their father.

== Bibliography ==
- Amoko, Apollo O. 2005. "The resemblance of colonial mimicry: A revisionary reading of Ngugi wa Thiong'o's The River Between". Research in African Literatures 36, : 34–50.
- Bongmba, Elias. 2001. "On love: Literary images of a phenomenology of love in Ngugi wa Thiong'o's The River Between". Literature & Theology: An International Journal of Theory, Criticism and Culture 15 (4): 373–395.
- Gordon, Natasha Maria. 2004. "To write what cannot be written: Female circumcision in African and Middle Eastern literature". Changing English: Studies in Culture and Education 11 (1): 73–87.
- Alphonse Odhiambo. 2016 made a secrete change on the unity of the two antagonizing communities that struggle over faith with the people they should lead, but the elders show their dignity and their readiness to follow change, a change that is brought by a young leader who is WAIYAKI.
- Grobler, G. M. M. 1998. "And the river runs on ...: Symbolism in two African novels". South African Journal of African Languages/Suid-Afrikaanse Tydskrif Vir Africa tale 18 (3): 65–67.
- James, Trevor. 2001. "Theology of landscape and Ngugi wa Thiong'o's The River Between; Mapping the sacred: Religion, geography and postcolonial literatures; Cross/Cultures: Readings in the Post/Colonial literatures in English." In (pp. 227–40) Scott, Jamie S. (ed. and introd.); Simpson-Housley, Paul (ed.), Mapping the Sacred: Religion, geography and postcolonial literatures. Amsterdam, Netherlands: Rodopi, 2001, xxxiii, 486 pp. (Amsterdam, Netherlands: Cross/Cultures: Readings in the Post/Colonial literatures in English 48), eds. Jamie S. Scott, Paul Simpson-Housley, 486. Amsterdam, Netherlands: Rodopi.
- Karambiri, Sarah. 2003. "Hybridity and mimicry in two novels: The River Between and In Search of April Raintree; intercultural Journeys/Parcours interculturels". In (pp. 83–96) Dagenais, Natasha (ed.); Daxell, Joanna (ed.); Rimstead, Roxanne (collaborator and preface), Intercultural Journeys/Parcours interculturels. Baldwin Mills, QC: Topeda Hill, 2003. xiv, 270 pp., eds Natasha Dagenais, Joanna Daxell and Roxanne Rimstead, 270. Baldwin Mills, QC: Topeda Hill.
- Nicholls, Brendon. 2003. "Clitoridectomy and gikuyu nationalism in Ngũgĩ wa Thiong'o's The River Between". Kunapipi: Journal of Post-Colonial Writing 25 (2): 40–55.
- Raditlhalo, Sam. 2001. "'Kenyan sheroes': Women and nationalism in Ngugi's novels". English Studies in Africa: A Journal of the Humanities 44 : 1–12.
- Wise, Christopher. 1995. "Messianic hallucinations and manichean realities: Ngũgĩ wa Thiong'o, Christianity, and the Third World novel". Christianity and Literature 45 (1): 31–51.
