= African literature =

Literature originating from Africa

African literature is literature from Africa, either oral ("orature") or written in African and Afro-Asiatic languages. Examples of pre-colonial African literature can be traced back to at least the fourth century AD. The best-known is the Kebra Negast, or "Book of Kings", from the 14th century AD. Another well-known book is the Garima Gospels, one of the oldest known surviving bibles in the world, written in Ge'ez around 500 AD.

A common theme during the colonial period is the slave narrative, often written in English or French for Western audiences. Among the first pieces of African literature to receive significant worldwide critical acclaim was Things Fall Apart, by Chinua Achebe, published in 1958. African literature in the late colonial period increasingly features themes of liberation and independence.

Post-colonial literature has become increasingly diverse, with some writers returning to their native languages. Common themes include the clash between past and present, tradition and modernity, self and community, and politics and development. Overall, female writers are today far better represented in African literature than they were before independence. The internet has also changed the landscape of African literature, leading to the rise of digital reading and publishing platforms such as OkadaBooks.

== List ==
- North African literature
  - Algerian literature
  - Egyptian literature
  - Libyan literature
  - Mauritanian literature
  - Moroccan literature
  - Tunisian literature
- East African literature
  - Comorian literature
  - Djiboutian literature
  - Eritrean literature
  - Ethiopian literature
  - Kenyan literature
  - Malagasy literature
  - Mauritian literature
  - Rwandan literature
  - Seychellois literature
  - Somali literature
  - South Sudanese literature
  - Sudanese literature
  - Tanzanian literature
  - Ugandan literature
- Middle African literature
  - Brazzaville-Congolese literature
  - Burundian literature
  - Cameroonian literature
  - Central African literature
  - Chadian literature
  - Equatoguinean literature
  - Gabonese literature
  - Kinshasa-Congolese literature
  - Santomean literature
- West African literature
  - Beninese literature
  - Bissau-Guinean literature
  - Burkinabe literature
  - Cape Verdean literature
  - Gambian literature
  - Ghanaian literature
  - Guinean literature
  - Ivorian literature
  - Liberian literature
  - Malian literature
  - Nigerien literature
  - Nigerian literature
  - Senegalese literature
  - Sierra Leonean literature
  - Togolese literature
- Southern African literature
  - Angolan literature
  - Botswanan literature
  - Eswatinian literature
  - Lesothan literature
  - Malawian literature
  - Mozambican literature
  - Namibian literature
  - South African literature
  - Zambian literature
  - Zimbabwean literature

== Overview ==
As George Joseph notes in his chapter on African literature in Understanding Contemporary Africa, whereas European views of literature stressed a separation of art and content, African awareness is inclusive and "literature" can also simply mean an artistic use of words for the sake of art alone. Traditionally, Africans do not radically separate art from teaching. Rather than write or sing for beauty in itself, African writers, taking their cue from oral literature, use beauty to help communicate important truths and information to society. An object is considered beautiful because of the truths it reveals and the communities it helps to build.

== Oral literature ==
Oral literature (or orature, the term coined by Ugandan scholar Pio Zirimu) may be in prose or verse. The prose is often mythological or historical and often includes tales of the trickster character. An example of such prose is the tortoise-and-birds fable that Okonkwo's wife Ekwefi tells her daughter Ezinma in Things Fall Apart by Chinua Achebe. Moreover, Bascom discusses a selection of short animal trickster stories in chapter 4 of African Folktales in the New World. Storytellers in Africa sometimes use call-and-response techniques to tell their stories. Poetry describes a narrative poem based on a short, ribald anecdote. It is often sung through narrative epic, occupational verse, ritual verse, and praise poems of rulers and other prominent figures. Praise singers, bards sometimes known as "griots", tell their stories with music. Also recited, often sung, are love songs, work songs, children's songs, along with epigrams, proverbs and riddles. These oral traditions exist in many languages including Fula, Swahili, Hausa, and Wolof.

In Algeria, oral poetry was an important part of Berber traditions when the majority of the population was illiterate. These poems, called Isefra, were used in both religious and secular contexts. The religious poems included devotions, prophetic stories, and poems honoring saints. Secular poetry may concern celebrations such as births and weddings, or accounts of heroic warriors. As another example, in Mali, oral literature or folktales continue to be broadcast on the radio in the native language Booma.

== Precolonial literature ==
Examples of pre-colonial African literature are numerous. In Ethiopia, there is a substantial body of literature in Ge'ez dating back at least to the fourth century AD; the best-known work in this tradition is the Kebra Nagast, or "Book of Kings." One popular form of traditional African folktale is the "trickster" story, in which a small animal uses its wits to survive encounters with larger creatures. Examples of animal tricksters include Anansi, a spider in the folklore of the Ashanti people of Ghana; Ijàpá, a tortoise in Yoruba folklore of Nigeria; and Sungura, a hare found in central and East African folklore. Other works in written form are abundant, namely in North Africa, the Sahel regions of west Africa, and on the Swahili coast. From Timbuktu alone, there are an estimated 300,000 or more manuscripts tucked away in various libraries and private collections, mostly written in Arabic but some in the native languages (namely Fula and Songhai). Many were written at the famous University of Timbuktu. The material covers a wide array of topics, including astronomy, poetry, law, history, faith, politics, and philosophy. Swahili literature, similarly, draws inspiration from Islamic teachings but developed under indigenous circumstances, one of the most renowned and earliest pieces of Swahili literature being Utendi wa Tambuka or "The Story of Tambuka" (dated 1728).

Precolonial African literature also included extensive manuscript traditions, particularly in regions connected to Islamic scholarly networks. Research conducted under the European Research Council-funded project Islam in the Horn of Africa documented more than 4,500 previously unrecorded manuscript texts produced in Arabic and local African languages across the Horn of Africa (Ethiopia, Eritrea, Djibouti, Somalia, Somaliland). The study identified over 3,500 individuals involved in manuscript production and transmission, including authors, copyists, teachers, and owners, as well as approximately 50 previously unknown authors active in the region. These manuscripts reflect a wide range of genres, including theology, law, poetry, history, and pedagogy, and illustrate the role of African scholars in transregional intellectual exchanges linking East Africa, the Red Sea, and the broader Islamic world. Such findings highlight the scale and diversity of written literary production in precolonial Africa alongside well-documented oral traditions.

In the Maghreb, North Africans such as Ibn Khaldun attained great distinction in Arabic literature. Medieval North Africa boasted universities such as those in Fes and Cairo, with extensive literature to supplement them.

== Colonial African literature ==
The African works best known in the West from the periods of colonization and the slave trade are primarily slave narratives, such as Olaudah Equiano's The Interesting Narrative of the Life of Olaudah Equiano (1789).

In the colonial period, Africans who were exposed to Western languages began to write in those languages. In 1911, Joseph Ephraim Casely Hayford (also known as Ekra-Agiman) of the Gold Coast (now Ghana) published what is probably the first African novel written in English, Ethiopia Unbound: Studies in Race Emancipation. Although the work moves between fiction and political advocacy, its publication and positive reviews in the Western press mark a watershed moment in African literature.

During this period, African plays written in English began to emerge. Herbert Isaac Ernest Dhlomo of South Africa published the first English-language African play, The Girl Who Killed to Save: Nongqawuse the Liberator in 1935. In 1962, Ngũgĩ wa Thiong'o of Kenya wrote the first East African drama, The Black Hermit, a cautionary tale about "tribalism" (discrimination between African tribes).

Among the first pieces of African literature to receive significant worldwide critical acclaim was the novel Things Fall Apart, by Chinua Achebe. Published in 1958, late in the colonial era, Things Fall Apart analysed the effects of colonialism on traditional African society.

African literature in the late colonial period (between the end of World War I and independence) increasingly showed themes of liberation, independence, and (among Africans in francophone territories) négritude. One of the leaders of the négritude movement, the poet and eventual president of Senegal, Léopold Sédar Senghor, published in 1948 the first anthology of French-language poetry written by Africans, Anthologie de la nouvelle poésie nègre et malgache de langue française (Anthology of the New Black and Malagasy Poetry in the French Language), featuring a preface by the French existentialist writer Jean-Paul Sartre.

For many writers, this emphasis was not restricted to their publishing. Many, indeed, suffered deeply and directly: censured for casting aside their artistic responsibilities to participate actively in warfare, Christopher Okigbo was killed in battle for Biafra against the Nigerian movement of the 1960s' civil war; Mongane Wally Serote was detained under South Africa's Terrorism Act No 83 of 1967 between 1969 and 1970, and subsequently released without ever having stood trial; in London in 1970, his countryman Arthur Norje committed suicide; Malawi's Jack Mapanje was incarcerated with neither charge nor trial because of an off-hand remark at a university pub; and, in 1995, Ken Saro-Wiwa was hanged by the Nigerian junta.

== Postcolonial African literature ==
With liberation and increased literacy following most African nations' independence in the 1950s and 1960s, African literature has grown dramatically in both quantity and recognition, with numerous African works appearing in Western academic curricula and on "best of" lists compiled since the end of the 20th century. African writers in this period wrote both in Western languages (notably English, French, and Portuguese) and in traditional African languages such as Hausa.

Ali A. Mazrui and others mention seven conflicts as themes: the clash between Africa's past and present, between tradition and modernity, between indigenous and foreign, between individualism and community, between socialism and capitalism, between development and self-reliance and between Africanity and humanity. Other themes in this period include social problems such as corruption, the economic disparities in newly independent countries, and the rights and roles of women. Female writers are today far better represented in published African literature than they were before independence (see Daughters of Africa, edited by Margaret Busby, 1992).

In 1986, Nigeria's Wole Soyinka became the first post-independence African writer to win the Nobel Prize in literature. Previously, Algerian-born Albert Camus had been awarded the prize in 1957. Other African Nobel laureates in literature are Naguib Mahfouz (Egypt) in 1988, Nadine Gordimer (South Africa) in 1991, J. M. Coetzee (South Africa) in 2003, Doris Lessing (UK/Zimbabwe) in 2007, and Abdulrazak Gurnah (Tanzania) in 2021.

In 1991, Ben Okri's novel The Famished Road won the Booker Prize. The Caine Prize for African Writing, an award for short stories, was established in 2000.

== Contemporary developments ==
There have been numerous literary productions in Africa since the early 2010s, although readership has not always been large. One can also notice the appearance of certain writings that break with the academic style. In addition, the shortage of literary critics can be deplored on the continent nowadays. Literary events seem to be very fashionable, including literary awards, some of which can be distinguished by their original concepts. As noted by Eric Essono Tsimi, the case of the Grand Prix of Literary Associations is quite illustrative. Brittle Paper, an online platform founded by Ainehi Edoro, has been described as "Africa's leading literary journal". Bhakti Shringarpure notes that "the dynamic digital impulses of African creativity have not only changed African literature but have also fundamentally altered literary culture as we know it."

The increasing use of the internet has also changed the way readers of African literature access content, which has led to the rise of digital reading and publishing platforms such as OkadaBooks.

== Literature published in Africa ==
Inaugurated in 1980 and operating until 2009, the Noma Award for Publishing in Africa was presented for outstanding African writers and scholars published in Africa.

== Notable novels by African writers ==
- Peter Abrahams (South Africa): Mine Boy (1946), A Wreath for Udomo (1956), This Island Now (1966)
- Baalu Girma (Ethiopia): Oromay ("The End")
- Chinua Achebe (Nigeria): Arrow of God (1964), No Longer At Ease (1960), Things Fall Apart (1958), A Man of the People (1966), Anthills of the Savannah (1987),
- Chimamanda Ngozi Adichie (Nigeria): Purple Hibiscus (2003), Half of a Yellow Sun (2006), Americanah (2013)
- Chigozie Obioma (Nigeria): The Fishermen (2015), An Orchestra of Minorities (2019)
- José Eduardo Agualusa (Angola): Rainy Season, Creole, The Book of Chameleons, My Father's Wives
- Ama Ata Aidoo (Ghana): Our Sister Killjoy (1977), Changes: a Love Story (1991)
- Germano Almeida (Cape Verde): O dia das calças roladas (1982), The Last Will and Testament of Senhor da Silva Araújo
- Elechi Amadi (Nigeria): The Concubine (1966), The Great Ponds, Sunset in Biafra
- Ayi Kwei Armah (Ghana): The Beautyful Ones Are Not Yet Born (1968), Two Thousand Seasons (1973)
- Sefi Atta (Nigeria): Everything Good Will Come (2005)
- Ayesha Harruna Attah (Ghana): Harmattan Rain
- Mariama Bâ (Senegal): Une si longue lettre (So Long a Letter)
- Chris Barnard (South Africa): Bundu, Mahala (1971)
- Ishmael Beah (Sierra Leone): A Long Way Gone (2007), Radiance of Tomorrow
- Mongo Beti (Cameroon): Poor Christ of Bomba (1956 as Le Pauvre Christ de Bomba)
- André Brink (South Africa): 'n Droe Wit Seisoen (A Dry White Season), Gerugte van Reen (Rumours of Rain)
- J. M. Coetzee (South Africa): Disgrace (1999), Life & Times of Michael K (1983)
- Mia Couto (Mozambique): Terra Sonâmbula (Sleepwalking Land)
- Ungulani Ba Ka Khosa (Mozambique): Ualalapi (1987)
- Luís Bernardo Honwana (Mozambique): Nós Matamos O Cão-Tinhoso e Outros Contos, translated as We Killed Mangy Dog and Other Stories (1964)
- Tsitsi Dangarembga (Zimbabwe): Nervous Conditions (1988), The Book of Not (2006), This Mournable Body (2020)
- Mohammed Dib (Algeria): La grande maison
- E. K. M. Dido (South Africa): 'n Stringetjie Blou Krale (A String of Blue Beads), Die Storie van Monica Peters (The Story of Monica Peters)
- Assia Djebar (Algeria): Les Enfants du Nouveau Monde
- K. Sello Duiker (South Africa): Thirteen Cents (2000), The Quiet Violence of Dreams (2001)
- Buchi Emecheta (Nigeria): The Bride Price (1976), The Slave Girl (1977), The Joys of Motherhood (1979), Destination Biafra (1982)
- Daniel Olorunfemi Fagunwa (Nigeria): Ogboju odẹ ninu igbo irunmalẹ (The Forest of a Thousand Demons)
- Nuruddin Farah (Somalia): From a Crooked Rib (1970), Sweet and Sour Milk (1979), Maps (1986)
- Athol Fugard (South Africa): Tsotsi
- Nadine Gordimer (South Africa): Burger's Daughter (1979), The Conservationist (1974), July's People (1981)
- Alex La Guma (South Africa): In the Fog of the Seasons' End (1972), The Stone-Country (1967), Time of the Butcherbird (1979), A Walk in the Night (2020)
- Abdulrazak Gurnah (Tanzania): Paradise (1994), By the Sea (2001), Afterlives (2020)
- Bessie Head (Botswana): When Rain Clouds Gather (1968), Maru (1971), A Question of Power (1973)
- Moses Isegawa (Uganda): Abyssinian Chronicles (1998)
- Rayda Jacobs (South Africa): The Slave Book, Eyes of the Sky, Confessions of a Gambler
- Tahar Ben Jelloun (Morocco): The Sacred Night, The Sand Child (1985), This Blinding Absence of Light (2001)
- Cheikh Hamidou Kane (Senegal): L'Aventure ambiguë (1961)
- Malama Katulwende (Zambia): Bitterness (2005)
- Yasmina Khadra (Algeria): The Swallows of Kabul (2002)
- Camara Laye (Guinea): The African Child (L'Enfant noir, 1953), The Radiance of the King (1954)
- Naguib Mahfouz (Egypt): The Beginning and the End (1949), Cairo Trilogy, Children of Gebelawi, Midaq Alley
- Charles Mangua (Kenya): Son of Woman (1971), A Tail in the Mouth
- Sarah Ladipo Manyika (Nigeria): In Dependence (2008)
- Dambudzo Marechera (Zimbabwe): The House of Hunger (1978)
- Dalene Matthee (South Africa): Kringe in 'n bos (Circles in a Forest)
- Zakes Mda (South Africa): Ways of Dying (1995), The Heart of Redness
- Thomas Mofolo (South Africa/Lesotho): Chaka (1925)
- Nadifa Mohamed (Somalia) Black Mamba Boy (2010), The Orchard of Lost Souls (2013), The Fortune Men (2021)
- Bai Tamia Moore (Liberia): Murder in the Cassava Patch (1968)
- Fadhy Mtanga (Tanzania): Kizungumkuti, Huba, Fungate
- Meja Mwangi (Kenya): Carcase for Hounds (1974), Going Down River Road (1976), Kill Me Quick (1973)
- Ngũgĩ wa Thiong'o (Kenya): A Grain of Wheat (1967), Matigari (1986), Petals of Blood (1977), Weep Not, Child (1964), Wizard of the Crow (2006)
- Lewis Nkosi (South Africa): Mandela's Ego (2006), Mating Birds (1986), Underground People (2002)
- Flora Nwapa (Nigeria): Efuru (1966), Idu (1970), One is Enough, Never Again, Women are Different
- Nnedi Okorafor (Nigeria): Zahrah the Windseeker (2005)
- Ben Okri (Nigeria): The Famished Road (1991), Songs of Enchantment (1993)
- Yambo Ouologuem (Mali): Le Devoir de Violence (Bound to Violence)
- Alan Paton (South Africa): Cry, The Beloved Country (1948)
- Pepetela (Angola) : Muana Puó, Mayombe, A Gloriosa Família (1997)
- Sol Plaatje (South Africa): Mhudi (1930)
- Nawal El Saadawi (Egypt): Woman at Point Zero (1975)
- Tayeb Salih (Sudan): Season of Migration to the North (1966)
- Wilton Sankawulo (Liberia): Birds Are Singing
- Karel Schoeman (South Africa): n Ander Land (Another Country), Na die Geliefde Land (Promised Land)
- Olive Schreiner (South Africa): The Story of an African Farm (1883)
- Benjamin Sehene (Rwanda): Le Feu sous la Soutane (Fire under the Cassock)
- Ousmane Sembène (Senegal): Xala (1973), The Black Docker (Le Docker Noir), God's Bits of Wood (Les Bouts de Bois de Dieu), The Last of the Empire (Le dernier de l'Empire), Tribal Scars (Voltaïque), (1962)
- Wole Soyinka (Nigeria): The Interpreters (1965), Seasons of Anomy (1973), Chronicles from the Land of the Happiest People on Earth (2021)
- Amos Tutuola (Nigeria): The Palm Wine Drinkard (1952), My Life in the Bush of Ghosts (1954), Simbi and the Satyr of the Dark Jungle, Feather Woman of the Jungle, The Witch-Herbalist of the Remote Town, Ajaiyi and his Inherited Poverty
- Marlene van Niekerk (South Africa): Triomf (Triumph, 1994)
- Yvonne Vera (Zimbabwe): Butterfly Burning (1998)
- José Luandino Vieira (Angola): Luuanda (1963)
- Joseph Jeffrey Walters (Liberia): Guanya Pau: A Story of an African Princess (1891)
- Berhanu Zerihun (Ethiopia): Ye'imba debdabbéwoch ("Tearful Letters")

== Notable African poets ==
- Chinua Achebe (Nigeria)
- Ama Ata Aidoo (Ghana)
- Jared Angira (Kenya)
- Kofi Anyidoho (Ghana)
- Kofi Awoonor (Ghana)
- Fadhy Mtanga (Tanzania)
- Breyten Breytenbach (South Africa)
- Dennis Brutus (South Africa)
- Tendai M. Shaba (Malawi)
- Abena Busia (Ghana)
- John Pepper Clark (Nigeria)
- José Craveirinha (Mozambique)
- Viriato Clemente da Cruz (Angola)
- Hadraawi (Somalia)
- Beyene Haile (Eritrea)
- Ingrid Jonker (South Africa)
- Jonathan Kariara (Kenya)
- Susan Kiguli (Uganda)
- Ahmadou Kourouma (Ivory Coast)
- Antjie Krog (South Africa)
- Mumbi Macharia (Kenya)
- Jack Mapanje (Malawi)
- Eugene Marais (South Africa)
- Don Mattera (South Africa)
- Bai Tamia Moore (Liberia)
- Micere Githae Mugo (Kenya)
- Togara Muzanenhamo (Zimbabwe)
- Christopher Mwashinga (Tanzania)
- Arthur Nortje (South Africa)
- Gabriel Okara (Nigeria)
- Nii Parkes (Ghana)
- Christopher Okigbo (Nigeria)
- Ben Okri (Nigeria)
- Marjorie Oludhe Macgoye (Kenya)
- Okot p'Bitek (Uganda)
- Lenrie Peters (Gambia)
- Dada Masiti (Somalia)
- Jean-Joseph Rabearivelo (Madagascar)
- Jacques Rabemananjara (Madagascar)
- Elie Rajaonarison (Madagascar)
- Ny Avana Ramanantoanina (Madagascar)
- Jean Verdi Salomon Razakandraina (Dox) (Madagascar)
- David Rubadiri (Malawi, Uganda)
- Tijan Sallah (Gambia)
- Dina Salústio (Cabo Verde)
- Léopold Sédar Senghor (Senegal)
- Bewketu Seyoum (Ethiopia)
- Warsan Shire
- Adam Small (South Africa)
- Wole Soyinka (Nigeria)
- Véronique Tadjo (Ivory Coast)
- Arménio Vieira (Cape Verde)
- Patricia Jabbeh Wesley (Liberia)

== See also ==
- African cinema
- African-American literature
- Caine Prize for African Writing
- Heinemann African Writers Series
- International Research Confederacy on African Literature and Culture
- List of African novelists
- List of African writers by country
- Poetry in Africa
- Best African Thriller or Suspense

== Bibliography ==
- Werku, Dagnachew, The Thirteenth Sun, 1968.
- Berhanemariam, Sahlesillasse, The Warrior King, 1974.
- Moore, Gerald (1980). Twelve African Writers. Bloomington: Indiana University Press. ISBN 9780253196194.
- Alain Ricard (1987). "Museum, Mausoleum, or Market: The Concept of National Literature". Research in African Literatures. 18 (3): 293–303. JSTOR 4618186.
- Schipper, Mineke (1987). "National Literatures and Literary History". Research in African Literatures. 18 (3): 280–292. JSTOR 4618185.
- Busby, Margaret (ed.), Daughters of Africa: An International Anthology of Words and Writings by Women of African Descent from the Ancient Egyptian to the Present, Jonathan Cape, 1992.
- Mazrui, Ali A. (ed.), General History of Africa, vol. VIII, UNESCO, 1993, ch. 19, Ali A. Mazrui et al., "The development of modern literature since 1935".
- Marvin X. Black Theatre: a periodical of the black theatre movement, New York: 1994
- Gordon, April A., and Donald L. Gordon, Understanding Contemporary Africa, London: Lynne Rienner, 1996, ch. 12, George Joseph, "African Literature".
- Gikandi, Simon (ed.), Encyclopedia of African Literature, London: Routledge, 2003.
- Irele, Abiola, and Simon Gikandi (eds), The Cambridge History of African and Caribbean Literature, 2 vols, Cambridge [u.a.]: Cambridge University Press, 2004. Table of contents
- Shamim, Amna. Gynocentric Contours of the Male Imagination: A Study of the Novels of Chinua Achebe and Ngugi wa Thiong'o. New Delhi: Idea Publishing, 2017. ISBN 9788193326978
