= Outline of literature =

Written works of art

The following outline is provided as an overview of and topical guide to literature:

Literature is any collection of written work. The term is also used more narrowly for writings considered an art form, especially novels, plays, and poems. It includes both print and digital writing. In recent centuries, the definition has expanded to include oral literature, much of which has been transcribed. Literature is a method of recording, preserving, and transmitting knowledge and entertainment. It can also have a social, psychological, spiritual, or political role.

See also the Outline of poetry.

== What type of thing is literature? ==
Literature can be described as all of the following:

- Communication – activity of conveying information. Communication requires a sender, a message, and an intended recipient, although the receiver need not be present or aware of the sender's intent to communicate at the time of communication; thus communication can occur across vast distances in time and space.
  - Written communication (writing) – representation of language in a textual medium through the use of a set of signs or symbols (known as a writing system).
- Subdivision of culture – shared attitudes, values, goals, and practices that characterizes an institution, organization, or group.
  - One of the arts – imaginative, creative, or nonscientific branch of knowledge, especially as studied academically.

== Essence of literature ==
- Composition –
- World literature –
- Creative writing –

== Forms of literature ==
=== Oral literary genres ===
Oral literature

- Oral poetry –
  - Epic poetry –
    - Legend –
    - Mythology –
    - Ballad –
- Folktale –
- Oral Narrative –
  - Oral History –
  - Urban legend –
- Christian literature –

=== Written literary genres ===
- Cordel Literature
- Children's literature –
- Constrained writing –
- Electronic literature – Literary fiction and poetry that uses the capabilities of computers and networks
  - Digital poetry –
  - Audiobook –
  - Interactive fiction –
  - Hypertext fiction – literary fiction written with hypertextual links
  - Fan fiction
  - Cell phone novel
  - Chatbot –
  - e-reader –
  - e-books –
  - Podcast – although not a form of literature in the traditional sense. It is often attributed by many as the neo-"Digital Oratory" form of literature.
- Liberature - literature where the material form is an essential part of the work.
- Poetry (see that article for an extensive list of subgenres and types)
  - Aubade –
  - Clerihew –
  - Epic –
  - Grook – form of short aphoristic poem invented by the Danish poet and scientist Piet Hein, who wrote more than 7,000 of them.
  - Haiku – form of short Japanese poetry consisting of three lines.
  - Instapoetry
  - Tanka – classical Japanese poetry of five lines.
  - Lied –
  - Limerick – a kind of a witty, humorous, or nonsense poem, especially one in five-line anapestic or amphibrachic meter with a strict rhyme scheme (aabba), which is sometimes obscene with humorous intent.
  - Lyric –
  - Ode –
  - Rhapsody –
  - Song –
  - Sonnet –
  - Speculative poetry –
- Prison literature –
- Rhymed prose –
  - Saj'
    - Maqama
  - Fu (literature)
  - Rayok

==== Non-fiction ====
Non-fiction

- Autobiography –
- Biography –
- History –
- Diaries and Journals –
- Magazine –
- Literary criticism –
- Memoir –
- Outdoor literature –
- Self-Help –
- Spiritual autobiography –
- Travel literature –
- Dictionary –

==== Fiction genres ====
Fiction

- Adventure novel –
- Airport novels –
- Comedy –
- Parody –
- Satire –
- Crime fiction –
  - Detective fiction –
    - Hardboiled –
    - Whodunit –
  - Newgate novel –
- Erotic literature –
- Fable –
- Fairy tale –
- Family saga –
- Gothic –
  - Southern Gothic –
- Historical fiction –
  - Western fiction literature –
- Inspirational fiction –
- Invasion literature –
- Mystery –
- Philosophical literature –

Inspirational fiction (religious literature) –

- Psychological fiction –
- Psychological thriller –
- Romance (heroic literature) –
- Romance –
  - Historical romance –
    - Regency romance –
  - Inspirational romance –
  - Paranormal romance –
- Saga –
- Speculative fiction –
  - Alternate history –
  - Fantasy – (for more details see Fantasy subgenres, fantasy literature)
    - Epic fantasy –
    - Science fantasy –
    - Steampunk –
    - Urban fantasy –
    - Weird fantasy –
  - Horror –
    - Lovecraftian horror –
    - Weird menace –
  - Science fiction – (for more details see Science fiction genres and related topics
    - Cyberpunk –
    - Hard science fiction –
    - Space opera –
  - Supernatural fiction –
- Sensation novel –
- Slave narrative –
- Thriller –
  - Conspiracy fiction –
  - Legal thriller –
  - Spy fiction/Political thriller –
  - Techno-thriller –

== Literature by region and country ==
=== Asia ===
- East Asian literature
  - Chinese literature
  - Japanese literature
    - Manga
  - Korean literature
  - Mongolian literature
  - Taiwanese literature
- South Asian literature
  - Bangladeshi literature
  - Bhutanese literature
  - Indian literature
    - Assamese literature
    - Bengali literature
    - Bhojpuri language#Bhojpuri literature
    - Indian English literature
    - Gujarati literature
    - Hindi literature
    - Kannada literature
    - Kashmiri literature
    - Konkani literature
    - Malayalam literature
    - Maithili literature
    - Meitei literature
    - Marathi literature
    - Mizo literature
    - Nepali literature
    - Odia literature
    - Punjabi literature
    - Rajasthani literature
    - Sanskrit literature
    - Sindhi literature
    - Tamil literature
    - Telugu literature
    - Urdu literature
  - Maldivian literature
  - Nepalese literature
  - Pakistani literature
  - Sri Lankan literature
- Southeast Asian literature
  - Brunei literature
  - Burmese literature
  - Cambodian literature
  - Indonesian literature
  - Laotian literature
  - Malaysian literature
  - Philippine literature
  - Singaporean literature
  - Thai literature
  - Timoran literature
  - Vietnamese literature
- Central Asian literature
  - Kazakh literature
  - Kyrgyz literature
  - Tajik literature
  - Turkmen literature
  - Uzbek literature

=== Europe ===
  - Albanian literature
  - Andorran literature
  - Armenian literature
  - Aromanian literature
  - Austrian literature
  - Azerbaijani literature
  - Basque literature
  - Belarusian literature
  - Belgian literature
    - Flemish literature
  - Bosnian literature
  - Bulgarian literature
  - British literature
    - Cornish literature
    - English literature
    - Manx literature
    - Jèrriais literature
    - Scottish literature
      - Scots-language literature
      - Scottish Gaelic literature
    - Ulster literature
    - Welsh literature in English
    - Welsh-language literature
  - Croatian literature
  - Cypriot literature
    - Turkish Cypriot literature
  - Czech literature
  - Danish literature
    - Faroese literature
    - Greenlandic literature
  - Dutch literature
    - Frisian literature
  - Esperanto literature
  - Estonian literature
  - Finnish literature
    - Åland literature
  - French literature - also Francophone literature
    - Breton literature
    - Occitan literature
  - Georgian literature
    - Abkhaz literature
    - Chechen literature
    - Ossetian literature
  - German literature
  - Greek literature
  - Hungarian literature
  - Icelandic literature
  - Irish literature
    - Gaelic literature
    - Literature of Northern Ireland
  - Italian literature
    - Friulian literature
    - Sardinian literature
    - Venetian literature
    - Western Lombard literature
  - Kazakh literature
  - Kosovar literature
  - Latvian literature
  - Liechtensteiner literature
  - Lithuanian literature
  - Luxembourg literature
  - Macedonian literature
  - Maltese literature
  - Moldovan literature
  - Monégasque literature
  - Montenegrin literature
  - Norwegian literature
  - Polish literature
  - Portuguese literature
  - Romanian literature
  - Russian literature
  - Sammarinese literature
  - Serbian literature
  - Slovak literature
  - Slovene literature
  - Spanish literature
    - Aragonese literature
    - Asturian literature
    - Catalan literature
    - Galician-language literature
  - Swedish literature
  - Swiss literature
  - Turkish literature
  - Ukrainian literature
  - Yiddish literature

=== Middle East and North Africa ===
  - Afghan literature
  - Algerian literature
  - Arabic literature
  - Bahraini literature
  - Egyptian literature
  - Ethiopian literature
  - Emirati literature
  - Iranian literature
  - Iraqi literature
  - Israeli literature
  - Jordanian literature
  - Kuwaiti literature
  - Kurdish literature
  - Lebanese literature
  - Libyan literature
  - Moroccan literature
  - Oman literature
  - Pakistani literature
  - Palestinian literature
  - Persian literature
  - Qatari literature
  - Saudi literature
  - Syrian literature
  - Tunisian literature
  - Turkish literature
  - Yemeni literature

=== North and South America ===
- North American literature
  - American literature
    - African American literature
    - Native American literature
    - Southern literature
    - Deaf American literature
  - Canadian literature
    - Quebec literature
  - Mexican literature
- Caribbean literature
  - Cuban literature
  - Dominican Republic literature
  - Guadeloupean Literature
  - Haitian literature
  - Jamaican literature
  - Martinican Literature
  - Puerto Rican literature
  - Barthélemois literature
  - Trinidad and Tobago literature
- Central American literature
  - Costa Rican literature
  - Salvadoran literature
  - Guatemalan literature
  - Honduran literature
  - Nicaraguan literature
  - Panamanian literature
- South American literature
  - Argentine literature
  - Bolivian literature
  - Brazilian literature
  - Chilean literature
  - Colombian literature
  - Ecuadorean literature
  - Guyanese literature
  - Paraguayan literature
  - Peruvian literature
  - Uruguayan literature
  - Venezuelan literature

=== Oceania ===
- Oceanian literature
  - Australian literature
  - Fijian literature
  - Kiribati literature
  - Marshall Islands literature
  - Micronesian literature
  - Nauran literature
  - New Zealand literature
  - Papua New Guinean literature
  - Palau literature
  - Samoan literature
  - Solomon Islands literature
  - Tongan literature
  - Tuvalan literature
  - Vanuatu literature

=== Sub-Saharan Africa ===
- East African literature
  - Burundian literature
  - Comorian literature
  - Djibouti literature
  - Eritrean literature
  - Kenyan literature
  - Madagascar literature
  - Malawian literature
  - Mauritian literature
  - Mozambique literature
  - Réunion literature
  - Rwandan literature
  - Seychelles literature
  - Somali literature
  - Somaliland literature
  - South Sudanese literature
  - Sudanese literature
  - Tanzanian literature
  - Ugandan literature
  - Zambian literature
  - Zimbabwean literature
- Central African literature
  - Angolan literature
  - Cameroonian literature
  - Literature of Central African Republic
  - Chadian literature
  - Congolese literature
  - Equatorial Guinea literature
  - Gabonese literature
  - São Tomé and Príncipe literature
- Southern African literature
  - Botswanan literature
  - Swazi literature
  - Lesotho literature
  - Namibian literature
  - South African literature
    - Afrikaans literature
- West African literature
  - Beninese literature
  - Burkina Faso literature
  - Literature of Cape Verde
  - Gambian literature
  - Ghanaian literature
  - Guinean literature
  - Guinea-Bissau literature
  - Ivory Coast literature
  - Liberian literature
  - Malian literature
  - Mauritanian literature
  - Literature of Niger
  - Nigerian literature
    - Yoruba literature
  - Senegalese literature
  - Sierra Leonean literature
  - Togo literature

== History of literature ==
History of literature

- History of the book
- History of theater
- History of science fiction
- History of ideas
- Intellectual history

=== Literature by written language ===
- Bronze Age literature
  - Sumerian
  - Ancient Egyptian
  - Akkadian
- Classical literature
  - Avestan
  - Chinese
  - Greek
  - Hebrew
  - Latin
  - Pali
  - Prakrit
  - Sanskrit
  - Syriac
  - Sangam literature
  - Middle Persian literature
- Medieval literature
  - Medieval Dutch literature
  - Medieval French literature
  - Byzantine literature
  - Medieval Bulgarian literature
  - Old English literature
  - Middle English literature
  - Medieval German literature
  - Old Irish literature
  - Old Norse literature
  - Georgian literature
  - Catalan literature
  - Medieval Welsh literature
  - Renaissance literature
  - Early Modern literature
  - Baroque
  - English literature
  - French literature
  - German literature
  - Italian literature
  - Spanish literature
  - Bengali literature
  - Hindi literature
  - Kannada literature
  - Newari literature
  - Telugu literature
  - Chinese literature
  - Japanese literature
  - Korean literature
  - Arabic literature
  - Persian literature
  - Armenian literature
  - Turkish literature

==== Literature by century ====
- Ancient literature - until the 6th century CE
- Early medieval literature - 6th through 9th centuries
- 10th century in literature
- 11th century in literature
- 12th century in literature
- 13th century in literature
- 14th century in literature
- 15th century in literature
- 16th century in literature
- 17th century in literature
- 18th century in literature
- 19th century in literature
- 20th century in literature
- 21st century in literature

==== Literature by year ====
- List of years in literature
- Table of years in literature

== General literature concepts ==
- Book
- Western canon –
- Teaching of writing:
  - Composition –
  - Rhetoric –
- Poetry –
  - Prosody –
  - Meter –
  - Scansion –
  - Constrained writing –
- Poetics –
  - Villanelle –
  - Sonnet –
  - Sestina –
  - Ghazal –
  - Ballad –
  - Blank verse –
  - Free verse –
  - Epic poetry –
- Prose –
  - Fiction –
  - Non-fiction –
  - Biography –
- Prose genres –
  - Essay –
  - Flash prose –
  - Hypertext fiction –
  - Journalism –
  - Novel –
  - Novella –
  - Short story –
- Theater –
  - History of theater –
- Rhetoric –
  - Metaphor –
  - Metonymy –
  - Symbol –
  - Allegory –
- Basic procedural knowledge
  - Poetry analysis –
  - effective reasoning in argument writing
- Narratology
  - Frame tale –
  - Anecdote –
  - In Medias Res –
  - Point of view –
- Literary criticism – an application of literary theory
  - Marxist literary criticism –
  - Semiotic literary interpretation –
  - Psychoanalytic literary interpretation –
  - Feminist literary interpretation –
  - New historicism –
  - Queer literary interpretation –

== Literary awards ==
- List of literary awards
- List of poetry awards

== Persons influential in the field of literature ==
- List of authors
- Category:Literary critics
- List of writers
  - List of women writers

== Literature creation ==
- Author
- Publisher
- Editor
- Copy editor
- Writer

== Literature distribution ==
- Publishing
- Library
- Bookselling
- Magazine

== See also ==
- Index of literature articles
- Lists of books
- English studies
- List of poems
- List of poetry collections
