= Francophone literature =

Literature from the French-speaking world

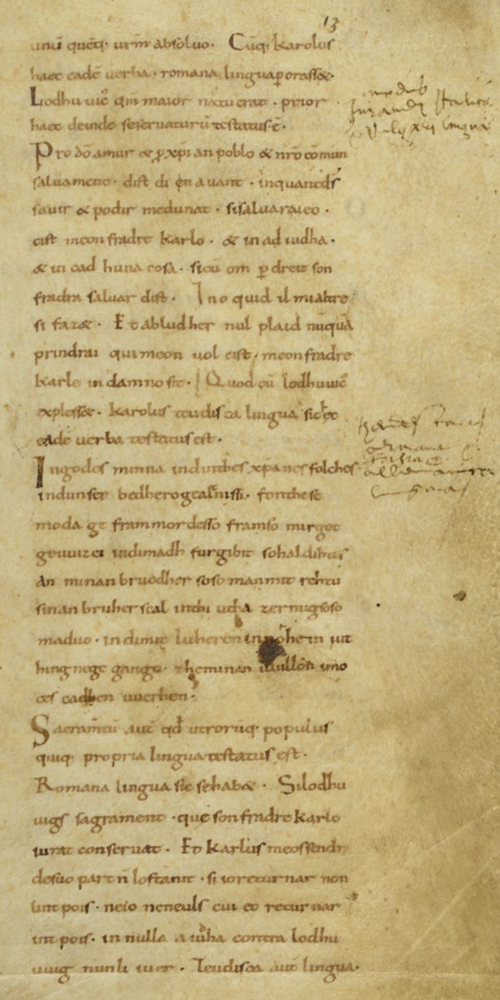
The Serments de Strasbourg, the oldest preserved text in the French language.

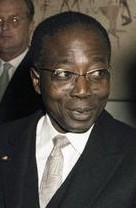
Léopold Sédar Senghor a prominent Francophone writer and politician. Senghor was the first African elected as a member of the Académie française.

Francophone literature is literature written in the French language. The existence of a plurality of literatures in the French language has been recognised, although the autonomy of these literatures is less defined than the plurality of literatures written in the English language. Writings in the French language from Belgium, Canada and Switzerland were recognised as belonging to distinct traditions long before writings from colonial territories of France. Writing in French by Africans was formerly classified as "colonial literature" and discussed as part of colonial studies for its ethnographical interest, rather than studied for its literary merit. Any texts in French from the colonies and territories that were considered to have merit were subsumed under the classification of French literature. The nature and importance of Francophone literature in various territories of the former French Empire depends on the concentration of French settlers, the length of time spent in colonial status, and how developed indigenous languages were as literary languages. It was only following the Second World War that a distinction started to be made in literary studies and anthologies between French literature and other writing in French. In 1960 Maurice Bémol published Essai sur l'orientation des littératures de langue française au XXe siècle; the plural in the title emphasised the study's new approach of examining the level of autonomy of the languages.

Paris remains the most powerful centre of Francophone publishing, although important publishers have developed elsewhere, notably in Quebec where influential publishing houses have long attracted Francophone writers from across the world.

The term has historically been used to refer only to literature from Francophone countries outside France, but modern usage includes any literature written in French. Francophone literature therefore applies to the whole French-speaking world in the broadest sense of the term.

== By Country ==
Francophone literature may refer to aspects of:

- Literature of French-speaking European countries
  - Literature of France
  - Literature of Belgium
  - Literature of the Grand Duchy of Luxembourg
  - Literature of Switzerland
- Literature of Canada
  - List of French Canadian writers from outside Quebec
  - Literature of Quebec
    - List of Quebec authors
- Literature of the United States
  - Literature of Louisiana
  - Luterature of New England
- Literature of the French Caribbean countries and dependencies
  - Literature of Guadeloupe
  - Literature of Haiti
  - Literature of Martinique
- Literature of French South America
  - Literature of French Guiana
- Literature of Francophone Africa
  - Literature of Algeria
  - Literature of Benin
  - Literature of Burkina Faso
  - Literature of Burundi
  - Literature of Cameroun
  - Literature of the Central African Republic
  - Literature of Chad
  - Literature of the Comoros
  - Literature of the Democratic Republic of the Congo
  - Literature of the Republic of the Congo
  - Literature of Côte d'Ivoire
  - Literature of Djibouti
  - Literature of Gabon
  - Literature of Guinea
  - Literature of Madagascar
  - Literature of Mali
  - Literature of Mauritania
  - Literature of Mauritius
  - Literature of Morocco
  - Literature of Niger
  - Literature of Rwanda
  - Literature of Réunion
  - Literature of Senegal
  - Literature of the Seychelles
  - Literature of Togo
  - Literature of Tunisia
  - Postcolonial literature
  - List of African writers (by country)
- Francophone literature of countries in Asia
  - Literature of Lebanon (see: Écrivains libanais francophones)
  - Literature of Cambodia
  - Literature of Laos
  - Literature of Vietnam

== Francophone writers ==
- List of French-language poets
- List of French-language authors
- Georges Simenon (Belgium)
- Maurice Maeterlinck (Belgium)
- Jacques Roumain (Haiti)
- Léopold Sédar Senghor (Senegal)
- Blaise Cendrars (Switzerland)
- Alfred Mercier (Louisiana)
- Simonie de la Houssaye (Louisiana)
- Victor Séjour (Louisiana)
- Émile Nelligan (Canada)

== See also ==
- Francophonie
- Geographical distribution of French speakers
- Acadian literature
