= Malama =

Malama may refer to:

== People ==
Given name

- Malama Katulwende, Zambian author, poet and thinker
- Malama Meleisea, Samoan historian
- Malama Solomon (born 1951), American politician and member of the Hawaii Senate

Surname

- Donashano Malama (born 1991), Zambian footballer
- Happy Malama (born 1947), Zambian footballer / goalkeeper

== Other uses ==
- SS Malama, a United States cargo ship that saw service in World War II
- Uroplatus malama a species of lizard

== See also ==
- Malamas, a surname
