= Kiru Taye =

Nigerian writer

- Writing career
- Genre: Romance
- Notable awards: 2015 Romance Writer of the Year at Nigeria Writer Awards

Kiru Taye is a Nigerian writer, who specializes in romance novels.

== Career ==
Taye began writing romantic novels after her inability to find localized romantic novels. In 2015, Taye wrote a short story, "Lunch with Ifemelu", which she claims was inspired from Americanah by Chimamanda Ngozi Adichie. The story is centered on Obinze, a married man who intends to have an affair with an old admirer, Ifemelu.

In 2017, she was listed as the 3rd best selling Nigerian authors by OkadaBooks. Notwithstanding, in a 2017 blogpost on Brittle Paper, she described how it is an uphill task for her to increase readership for her writings. In June 2018, her books were the subject of an exploratory discussion on the genesis and acceptance of pleasurable sex among Africans, and the role of novelist in documenting it. Excerpts from Taye's book, His treasure was investigated in the publication.

=== Books ===
- An Engagement challenge (2012)
- Keeping Secrets (2014)
- Making Scandal (2014)
- Riding Rebel (2015)
- Bound to Fate (2016)
- Bound to Ransom (2016)
- Bound to Passion (2016)
- Bound to Favor (2018)

== Awards ==
In 2017, she won the UFERE Awards as the 2017 Author of the year.
