= Bhutanese Nepali literature =

Literature in Nepali language in Bhutan

Bhutanese Nepali literature refers to the literary works in the Nepali language by Bhutanese people. This started from 1962 with the publishing of Kuensel (first national newspaper).

== History ==
More than 90% of Bhutanese people used Nepali as a common language before 1960.

In 1962, Bhutan started to publish Kuensel (first national newspaper) from Madi printing press of Kalimpong, India, and Nepali literature in Bhutan had an opportunity to broaden its area. In those days, Nepali articles written by the writers from, primarily, Kalimpong and Darjeeling used to be published in Kunsel. This provided the interest in Nepali literature to the Nepali speaking southern Bhutanese. In the process of developing language and literature, in 1970, the government of Bhutan started to publish another magazine "Drucklosal" quarterly. The editor of the magazine was Gauri Shankar Upadhaya. Gradually, the magazine piqued the interest of many Nepali-speaking Bhutanese. The magazine was published 19 volumes.

In 1984, the government banned the magazine. And in 1987, the government burned all the Nepali books that were taught in Bhutanese schools. The government banned both written and spoken Nepali language. Until 1980, in the process of development of Nepali literature, Devi Bhakta Lamitare's political article "Dankido Bhutan" (Murder of Democracy) (1970), "Kumbhaparva”, “Himachal philosophy” and Narayan Luitel's religious literature "Shivalaya Mahatme" (1977) had been published. Government ban and lack of resources and favorable environment for the study of literature were the obstacles in the development of Bhutanese Nepali literature. In the beginning of the 1980s, Gauri Shankar Upadhyaya was considered as the first literary figure who wrote Nepali literature. He wrote his works while living in Banaras, India.

== Literature in refugee camps in Nepal ==
Bhutanese refugee camps were established in the beginning of the 1990s. They received food from the World Food Programme (WFP), and clothing and housing from Lutheran Social Service (LSS) and education from Caritas Nepal. United Nations High Commissioner for Refugees (UNHCR) provided them with basic humanitarian assistance and international protection in co-operation with other national and international partners, including WFP. Later Bhutani Bhasa Parisad Nepal, a Nepali classes for elderly people focused on Bhutanese literature, was established. According to the census of 2007, a total of 107,807 refugees were registered by the UNHCR as a result of a joint verification process conducted with the government of Nepal. They were resettled in eight countries.

== Bhutanese literature after resettlement ==
By the end of 2008, Bhutanese refugees started resettling in eight countries: Australia, Denmark, Netherlands, New Zealand, Norway, United Kingdom, and United States. Efforts are being made by the Literature Council of Bhutan (LCOB) in promoting the Bhutanese Nepali literature.

== See also ==
- Bhutanese literature

== Bibliography ==
- Bhutan Hijo Ajaa by Balaram Poudel
- Albeda Belgadi by Shiva Lal Dahal
- "Badalbhitrako Phool" by Keeran Sharma Gautam
