= Malamas =

Malamas is a Greek surname. Notable people with the surname include:

- Ilias Malamas (born 1966), Greek swimmer
- Sokratis Malamas (born 1957), Greek singer and songwriter

== See also ==
- Malama (disambiguation), a given name and surname
