= Beninese literature =

Benin is a country in western Africa. It consists of a narrow wedge of territory extending northward for about 420 miles (680 km) from the Gulf of Guinea in the Atlantic Ocean, on which it has a 75-mile seacoast, to the Niger River, which forms part of Benin’s northern border with Niger. The official capital is Porto-Novo, but Cotonou is Benin’s largest city, its chief port, and its de facto administrative capital.

French is the official language and is usually used in literature, but there is also literature in Fon, Yom, Yoruba, Gen, Kabiyé, Tammari, Bariba, Fulfulde and other national languages.

Folk stories and feminist works hold high significance in Benin literature.

== Oba of Benin ==
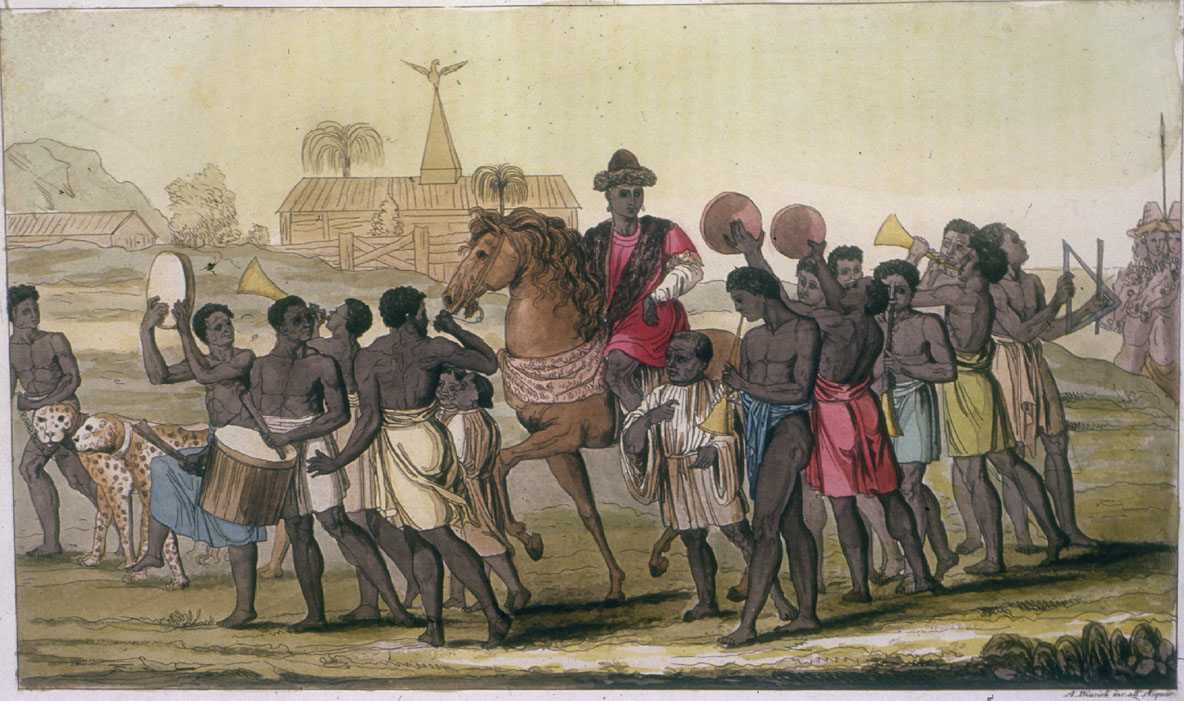
Oba of Benin

The modern Republic of Benin (La République du Bénin) is not ruled by a king. The Oba of Benin is active in modern times as a literary figure in theater and literature. Historically, the ruler of the Kingdom of Dahomey was known as the Oba of Benin. In the oral tradition of Benin, the Oba (King) of Benin is a demigod personified, as a cultural symbol, a spiritual icon, and a political figure. During the period of the Kingdom of Dahomey, the Oba entered any occasion with his vassals, who would sing to demonstrate his mythical status. These deified honorific titles and ceremonies elevated the Oba to an idealized status. The mythic overtones of the Oba of Benin symbolize not only the sanctity of the royal power but also the religious and cultural symbols of Benin. Threatened by political turmoil and commercial adventures in the white world, the Benin Empire has been in a turbulent era for a long time. As a representative of the male spirit, the Oba maintains the social order of Benin in literature, which is organized around the power of God. Historical figures, as the common point of Nigerian literature, are further expanded from the oral sources of historical sources. Written and oral literature simultaneously, and through the study of drama, convey that the Oba in Benin plays a pivotal role in the rich cultural heritage of indigenous people.

== Feminist literature ==
Patriarchy exists in the contemporary social structure of Benin society in southern Nigeria. Women are placed at a disadvantage. There are obvious discriminatory cultural customs in the social environment of Benin. In ancient times, an Oba (national leader/king of the country) ruled the kingdom of Benin. Beninese in Nigeria have a tradition of primogeniture; therefore, Oba has always been held by men, except Iyoba of Benin, Beninese women have been in a lower social class since ancient times. The Oba of Benin had a wife and many concubines, and these women could be given as gifts or commodities to the loyal sheikhs. In the classical patriarchal Beninese society, male exploitation and oppression of women were ubiquitous. Even in modern Beninese society, which has recognized occurrences of female genital mutilation, the number of incidences has not decreased.

The practice of widowhood is another patriarchal trait that persecutes African women for their feudal superstitions. In Benin, if a man dies prematurely, his widow will be summoned and asked to prove her innocence. The widow of the deceased is required to shave her head, sleep on the floor with the body for a few days, drink the water used to bathe the deceased and swear on his forehead. If the widow, unfortunately, dies in the process, then she will be considered guilty for the death of her husband. However, a widower who lost his wife was not required to perform this ritual. Instead, in some areas of Edo, the widower's family and friends would find another woman for him to sleep with until his wife was buried. In this way his wife's spirit would not disturb his sleep. In the 1980s, women in Africa began to give themselves a voice by writing articles, and many female writers and theorists centered on women emerged. Many outstanding writers and works have criticized patriarchal practices and supported women's political empowerment. West African literature and popular art forms are often linked to local women-centered theories, which can further achieve broader emancipation.

In historical Benin literature, most of the male images are bold, independent of the main power, and occupy the dominant position in society. Women are often dominated by their roles, engaged in simple work, and bear family responsibilities. With the rise of women's consciousness, many works from the perspective of women in the French-speaking Republic of Benin reflect the oppression of women's roles and great dissatisfaction with the unequal relationship between men and women.

== Language in literature ==
As a former French colony, Benin uses French as the official language of government and education. However, the widespread use of French as an official language is partly due to the restricted use of the local languages. In social and cultural aspects, language influences the choice and acceptance of writing conventions. Most African languages are ethnic minority languages, characterized by limited areas of use and inadequate description. The lack of formalized grammar and vocabulary and standardized orthography causes the language to be underdeveloped, which limits its use in society and literary works and promotes the widespread use of the French language. The French language is mostly taught in school. The low education rate of Benin leads to the frequency of the local Benin language in literary works being lower than in French works. In 1972, the government of Benin issued the Le Discours (Discourse) program, a government document calling for the establishment of a National Linguistic Institute to promote the development of all Beninese languages. As a follow-up to this policy, the National Linguistic Commission was established in 1974, and "National Linguistic Training Seminars" were held from 1979 until the 1980s. The seminars showed an alphabet for the Beninese, officially recognized 19 Beninese people, and set up local sub-commissions for the development of orthography in various locations. In 1984, the National Linguistic Training Seminars were renamed the National Center for Applied Linguistics.

Le Discours set up the Division d'alphabétisation et la presse rurale, which works to enhance the literacy of Beninese. At the same time, the government also created a literacy department for adults. By the 1990s, changes in Benin's regime led to a concomitant change in language policy. At a national conference held in February 1990, attendees unanimously agreed to adopt legislation in both French and Beninese. This conference officially selected Fon, Yoruba, Baatonum, Dendi, Aja and Ditammari for formal education and adult literacy. However, these six languages are still not truly national in Benin.

== Beninese folktales and oral literature ==
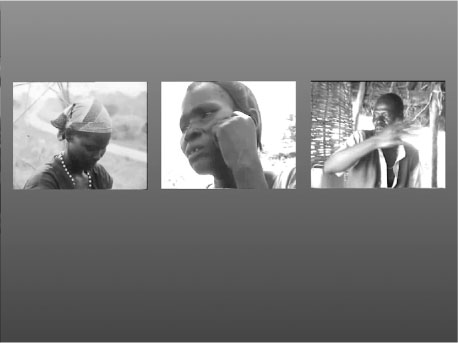
Oral Literature

Folk stories are an important cultural tradition in Benin. Literature in Benin had a strong oral tradition long before French became the dominant language. The Beninese folk story is the expression of the Beninese people's experience of the world.

Most African civilizations and traditions have been transmitted through oral communication. Benin has a long and rich oral tradition that can be traced back centuries. Benin's oral literature is not limited to stories; it also includes riddles, pins, tongue-twisters, proverbs, recitations, chants, and songs. Storytellers interpret the folklore of past tribes in these ways as well. Professor Dan Ben-Amos of the University of Pennsylvania believes that storytelling, one of the most important art forms in Africa, is a cultural legacy that perpetuates tribal history and mythology through oral narration to the next generation.

In contemporary times, oral literature is gradually dying out. Although linguists and anthropologists in Benin have collected as many oral stories as possible through visits to local families and villages in Benin, they have not been able to prevent the disappearance of many stories. Due to the strict assimilation policy in the French colonial system, the use of the Beninese languages is declining. Although the local Benin language has a formal income system, the oral literature of Benin has rarely been printed or transcribed. The colonial education system, urbanization, increasing economic difficulties, and foreign TV programs have all led to the gradual extinction of local oral literature and folk stories in Benin.

== From oral to written literature ==
Félix Couchoro wrote the first Beninese novel, L'Esclave, in 1929. This was the first written literary work in the history of Beninese literature. Although the book is not widely known, it has symbolic significance in Benin's literary history. L'Esclave is the development from oral description to written record. Another milestone in the development of African literature is Doguicimi by Beninese writer, Paul Hazoumé, which has been described as "the first historical novel of African literature". Kusum Aggarwal from the University of Delhi has said that Doguicimi conveys the perspectives of the colonized people in the colonies through ethnography, and she believes the book is an effort by Africans to reflect on themselves.

== Notable Beninese writers ==
- Olympe Bhêly-Quénum
- Jean Pliya
- Colette Senami Agossou Houeto
- Florent Couao-Zotti
- Richard Dogbeh
- Adelaide Fassinou
- Paulin J. Hountondji
- Paulin Joachim
- José Pliva

== See also ==
- List of Beninese writers
- Music of Benin
