= Abyssinian Chronicles =

1998 novel by Moses Isegawa

Abyssinian chronicles
- Author: Moses Isegawa
- Original title: Abessijnse kronieken
- Language: English
- Publisher: Alfred A. Knopf
- Publication date: 1998
- Publication place: Uganda
- Media type: Print (hardback & paperback)
- Pages: 512
- ISBN: 9780375406133

Abyssinian Chronicles (Abessijnse kronieken) is a 1998 novel by Ugandan author Moses Isegawa.

== Plot ==
The book is set in Uganda, in the 1970s and '80s. The book follows the life of narrator Mugezi Muwaabi, as he plots his own independence from his parents and capitalizes on his considerable natural resources of charm and intelligence. A grandfather, a father and his son are the three figures that form a tripod from which the novel is set. Grandpa represents the traditional order, his son Serenity the chaos of transition, and Mugezi the despair of a younger generation over the dead end of transition and its own prospects. Rootless and bitter, Mugezi flees to Europe from Uganda. The first part of the book centres on Mugezi, a young man growing up in post-colonial Uganda. Born in 1961, a year before Uganda attained independence, Mugenzi describes a troubled childhood living under the tyranny and strict rules of his parents. The family moves to Kampala, the nation's capital about the time Idi Amin comes to power in 1971. In the second half of the book Mugezi is excited about the country's prospects under Idi Amin, following the ouster of Milton Obote and his corrupt government. Soon, however, Amin's regime descends to the depths of brutality and mismanagement – starting with a botched "Africanization" campaign that leads to the expulsion of thousands of Asian businessmen.

== Critical reception ==
The book received mixed reviews. Richard Eder of The New York Times said : Abyssinian Chronicles suffers from a disabling split. It is best as a chronicle of Ugandan history and of the struggles of different generations of a family to cope with it. It is weakest as a third world bildungsroman. Anderson Tepper in a review in Salon noted: "Abyssinian Chronicles doesn’t quite synthesize the jumble. Instead, the reader is left, like Mugezi at the end, alone, a bit wobbly and haunted from such a long journey." Maya Jaggi in The Guardian wrote: "Abyssinian Chronicles may lack the sedate control of distance, but it has a momentum and energy that derive from the trauma it tells from the inside."
