= International Research Confederacy on African Literature and Culture =

The International Research Confederacy on African Literature and Culture (IRCALC) is an online non-profit, non-governmental confederation of writers, scholars and researchers from all over the world. IRCALC's scholarly initiative is mainly in research in African literature and providing a common ground for interaction between organizations, college departments, libraries and individuals for the exchange of information, ideas, and research findings that enrich the understanding of Africa's cultural heritage. The IRCALC board edits the Journal of African Literature and Culture (JALC) and the New Poetry (NP), both published by Progeny (Africa Research) International.
