= Guanya Pau: A Story of an African Princess =

Novel by Joseph Jeffrey Walters

- Author: Joseph Jeffrey Walters
- Language: English
- Genre: Fiction
- Set in: Liberia
- Publisher: Lauer & Mattill, Cleveland, Ohio
- Publication date: 1891
- Publication place: Liberia
- Pages: 149

Guanya Pau: A Story of an African Princess is an 1891 novel by Joseph Jeffrey Walters and is the earliest surviving novel published in English by a Black African.

== Background ==
Joseph Jeffrey Walters was born in Liberia to Vey parents some time in the 1860s (his exact birth date is not known). Between 1878 and 1882 Walters joined the Cape Mount Mission and later moved to the United States pursuing a college education. He studied at Storer College in West Virginia and in 1889 began studying at Oberlin College in Ohio. After completing his bachelor's degree, he returned to Liberia in 1893 on account of his worsening tuberculosis. He began teaching at the Cape Mount Mission in 1894 but died in November of the same year.

As a Christian missionary, Walters would have seen first-hand how the Protestant Church particularly operated a system of proselytism in Africa which often involved the teaching of Western cultural values to locals.

== Plot summary ==
The story begins with a descriptive introduction to a tribe of people called the Vey (today called the 'Vai'), of which Guanya Pau is a part, daughter of a chief of a town called Gallenah. Upon her father's death at the age of four, Guanya Pau was betrothed to a man called Kai Kundu who paid a handsome sum of money for her future hand in marriage. But Guanya, with her "independent bearing" and "scornful air", grew up to resent this man and this local system of the purchasing of multiple wives, falling in love instead with a local youth called Momo and vowing that she would rather drown than marry her appointed suitor.

On her sixteenth birthday, Kai Kundu comes to see her to discuss the prospect of their marriage but she rejects him, saying she would "just as soon love a monkey", a gesture which is ultimately futile as her marital fate has already been determined. As a result, Guanya decides to run away with her friend, Jassah.

The two girls hide in an ant hill for a day for fear of being detected and continue their journey at night. They are immediately panicked by the approaching presence of a group of local man but they move along before coming across the girls. Just after their departure, an injured elephant pursued by a Vey hunters stomps past the girls and inadvertently crushes a side of the ant hill and exposes the hiding location of the girls. The hunters fortunately fail to notice them and continue in their chase of the animal.

Travelling on, the girls come to a rice farm and, after disguising their faces, they join a crowd assembled at a king's house celebrating a wedding. Horrified that another woman may be being subjected to the same treatment of forced marriage that Guanya herself had experienced, the two girls endeavour to enquire about the couple and are told that the husband in question purchased his bride after she had been previously accounted for by another man, a gross breach of marital tradition. The girl herself ultimately "had no decision to make" in the affair.

The next day, Guanya encounters a woman who tells her of her own life story and her unhappy marriage to a man she does not love. The woman's story, one of her separation from her true love, is not dissimilar to Guanya's own experience. Her story ends with the disheartening conclusion of her resignation to an unhappy life and to the fact she will never see her lover again.

The girls travel onward and come across a "beautiful grove", a sacred spot for the burial of kings. They encounter a Council in session reviewing judicial cases in which local men have been accused of certain behaviours towards their wives. The men are acquitted under the pretence that a man's wife is his property to do with what he likes and Guanya is furious but says nothing upon Jassah's advice.

Moving on, the girls travel for a few days, enjoying their surroundings and the gaiety of life until they are forced to hide behind a mango tree from a group of men that approach. Guanya and Jassah overhear the men talking about their search for them and the reward that Kai Kundu has offered for their return. Hiding "half-dead with fright", the girls wait until the men move on and quickly head in the opposite direction.

The girls come across a village the next day to find in progress a mourning ceremony for a recently deceased local man. Tribal customs dictate that all in the village must mourn for the deceased, but as the man "had been a terror to his wives" whilst he was alive, his wives are pleased to hear of his death. As a result, they are killed for their behaviour, one murdered and two forced to drink a "fatal draught" of "sassa wood". Seeing this, Guanya Pau and Jassah quickly leave and head back to the road.

The girls come across another village where they are welcomed warmly by a family into their home. As they are preparing to sleep for a night, a "modest-looking fellow" enters the home and identifies Guanya Pau upon sight. Not knowing who the man is, the girls take flight.

They continue to run for many hours into the next day. As they slow down in an open field they realise they've been spotted by a group of men carrying weapons. One of the men identifies himself as a fellow native of Gallanah and explains that he recognises her as the daughter of the town's chief. Conceding that this is the case, Guanya and Jassah head back to the village escorted by the men.

Upon arrival, they are taken to the town's court. The questioner does not believe Guanya's claims of her heredity and royal importance and so the two girls are placed in the stocks for the night while someone is sent to ascertain the truth. During the night, the girls manage to break themselves free and escape.

While on the run they come across a stream by which there are a few fishermen, one of which offers the girls a lift in his canoe. After navigating a brief storm, they land in a nearby fishing village, where they find work on a rice farm. They work so effectively that their fellow workers are impressed by their prowess. At the end of the day over a meal, one of the worker women makes a speech praising the conviviality of life. The male overseer interrupts the women's conversation to reprimand them for slacking off work.

The next day, Guanya Pau and Jassah set about joining a group to go fishing in a sacred river. Local religious tradition holds that "no-one is permitted to put his hand or foot in the stream" for fear of angering the spirits who convene there. In her haste to cross the river, Guanya plunges into the water, much to the horror of the locals that are accompanying her. After hearing "nothing more" of Guanya's "sin" for the rest of the day, the two girls decide to leave the following morning.

That evening, as the girls are laying down to sleep, they are visited by a man claiming to have been sent searching for Guanya by Momo, who had hoped to buy her hand in marriage before she ran away. Thrilled by the news, Guanya struggles to sleep and passes the time recounting to Jassah how she and Momo met.

Guanya eventually sleeps and experiences a sequence of dreams involving a demon and later a chance meeting with Momo in the ranks of a religious congregation.

The following day, the two girls leave with their escort to find Momo. They reach a town where, while the man is enquiring about Momo, Guanya recognises another male from Gallanah and flees with Jassah in a canoe. By the next morning they are on Tosau Island.

After making arrangements to travel with the town's chief by canoe, they board his vessel along with another man who eye the girls "rather suspiciously". Arriving a few hours later and following directions in the town they have landed, the girls find themselves accosted by their fellow passenger who announces that Kai Kundu has men all over the region looking for them and that he will be bringing them back to him.

On the canoe ride back, Guanya Pau jumps overboard, shouts that she would prefer to drown than to be Kai Kundu's wife and dies.

== Themes ==
=== Oppression of Women ===
The treatment of women in Vey culture is thematically central to Walters' text. Guanya Pau's journey sees her interact with a number of women who have been victimised and marginalised as a result of gender inequality ingrained into African culture. It is through these interactions that Walters attempts to present his persuasive discourse on the flawed marital system of marrying off girls at a young age and the common practice of men taking multiple wives. This is seen, for example, in the story that the old lady with the baby on her back tells to Guanya, explaining that she is unhappy with her betrothal to a man she does not love and that she feels she has wasted her life serving a husband she did not desire to marry.

Institutionalised misogyny permeates the text: men frequently condemn the position of women in their society, equating them to cattle or objects to be traded. Men in positions of power (the judge at the court in the "beautiful grove", the Muslim cleric, the judge who refutes Guanya's royal status, for example) subscribe particularly vehemently to this attitude.

=== African Religion vs American Christianity ===
Walters often uses references to and excerpts from the Bible in order to embellish his narrative. As a Christian missionary, this perspective shapes the way he presents Vey culture; relevant passages taken from the Bible and even various quotes attributed to William Shakespeare seek to make the plight of the African nation more approachable for his intended American Christian readership. While the text is, compared to similar novels, accepting of Africa and its "potential", it operates on the assumption that Africa can be made better through the introduction of Western ideals (particularly those of Protestantism).

=== Nature ===
Walters often celebrates the geographical beauty of Africa as an element of its undiscovered, potential value; long, episodic passages of natural imagery intersects Guanya Pau's journey. Encounters with animals and humans alike (particularly men) presents the creatures (tigers, leopards, elephants, etc.) as allies in the girls' mission, whereas the more substantial threat to their safety is more often in the form of man.
