= Robert Zotoumbat =

Gabonese writer and teacher

- Born: 19 September 1944; Mékambo, Gabon
- Died: 22 April 2017 (aged 72); Libreville, Gabon
- Occupations: Writer, English teacher, Administrator
- Writing career
- Notable work: Histoire d'un enfant trouvé

Robert Zotoumbat (born 19 September 1944 in Mékambo, Gabon; died 22 April 2017 in Libreville) was a Gabonese writer, often regarded as either the first Gabonese novelist or a precursor of Gabonese novels.

== Biography ==
Robert Zotoumbat was born on 19 September 1944 in Mékambo, Gabon. After completing his studies, he became an English teacher and later took on administrative roles within private Protestant education as the director of secondary education. In 1971, he published Histoire d'un enfant trouvé. This 58-page autobiographical account tells the story of Ngoye, a child orphaned by famine in 1905. As a "moana-wa-za," or "child of the famine," Ngoye is adopted by a wealthy merchant, Mboula, but is mistreated by Mboula's wife, who acts like a wicked stepmother. Ngoye embarks on a quest to learn about his origins. Histoire d'un enfant trouvé is frequently considered the first Gabonese novel by some specialists in African literary history and the media. Robert Zotoumbat died in 2017. Jean-Léonard Nguéma Ondo, in an article on the history of the Gabonese novel, refers to him as "the precursor of the Gabonese novel and its successors from the 1980s generation."

== Work ==
The literary genre of Histoire d'un enfant trouvé is subject to debate, with several specialists disputing its status as a novel. Ludovic Emane Obiang notes that the text vacillates between the genre of a short story and a tale but considers that, despite its weaknesses, it is the first Gabonese text resembling a novel. Nguéma Ondo argues that the text uses more techniques from the tale genre.

=== Works ===
- 1971: Histoire d'un enfant trouvé. Yaoundé, Éditions CLE. Reissued in Libreville, Gabon, Maison gabonaise du livre, 2007.

== Bibliography ==
- Éric Joël Békalé, 50 figures de la littérature gabonaise de 1960 à 2010, Achères, Dagan, 2013. ISBN 978-2-919612-24-6
- Flavien Enongoué and Sylvère Mbondobari (eds.), Terre d’espérance, hommage à Robert Zotoumbat, preface by Emmanuel Issoze Ngondet, Libreville, Gabon, éditions Raponda Walker, 2019, 263 pages.
- Judicaël Gnangui, Statut et dynamique du personnage de l’orphelin dans le roman francophone d’Afrique subsaharienne, doctoral thesis in literatures defended at the University of the Sorbonne Nouvelle - Paris III, 2013. [Read online](https://tel.archives-ouvertes.fr/tel-00968888/document) (Histoire d'un enfant trouvé is one of the seven novels in the corpus of this study.)
- Jean-Léonard Nguéma Ondo, "Le roman gabonais des origines à nos jours", Annales de la Faculté des lettres et sciences humaines de l'Université Omar Bongo, Les Éditions du Silence, No. 12, pp. 103–123. [Read online](https://web.archive.org/web/20170517124205/http://pug-uob.org/pdf/annales/auteurs/roman_gabonais.pdf) (PDF article on the journal's website, preserved on the Internet Archive as of May 17, 2017.)
- Ludovic Emane Obiang, "Voyage au bout du silence", Notre Librairie, Revue des littératures du sud, Actualité littéraire 1998–1999, No. 138-139, September 1999-March 2000, p. 31.
