= Charles Mangua =

Kenyan writer (1939–2021)

Charles Mangua (1939 – 20 March 2021) was a Kenyan fiction writer. His novels explore, among other issues, the "hardship and urban poverty" experienced by ordinary people in places such as Nairobi, the capital of Kenya.

Mangua died on 20 March 2021, at the age of 85–86.

== Style and Works ==
Mangua's style was irreverent and often humorous. His early works, Son of Woman (1971) and A Tail in the Mouth (1972), sold more copies than any previous works of literature published in East Africa. His work had an influence on other Kenyan writers and he was awarded the Jomo Kenyatta Prize for Literature for A Tail in the Mouth.

== Bibliography ==
- 1971: Son of Woman, Nairobi: East African Publishing House.
- 1972: A Tail in the Mouth, Nairobi: East African Publishing House.
- 1986: Son of Woman in Mombasa, Nairobi: Heinemann.
- 1994: Kanina and I, East African Educational, Nairobi.
