= José Pliva =

Beninese actor, stage director and playwright (1966–2025)

- Born: 17 April 1966; Cotonou, Dahomey (now Benin)
- Died: 12 April 2025 (aged 58); Miami, Florida, U.S.
- Citizenship: Benin
- Occupations: Actor; stage director; playwright

José Pliya (17 April 1966 – 12 April 2025) was a Beninese actor, stage director and playwright. In 2003 he won the Young Writers' Award from the Académie française. Pliya died on 12 April 2025, at the age of 58.
