= Tendai M. Shaba =

Malawian poet, author, and spoken word artist

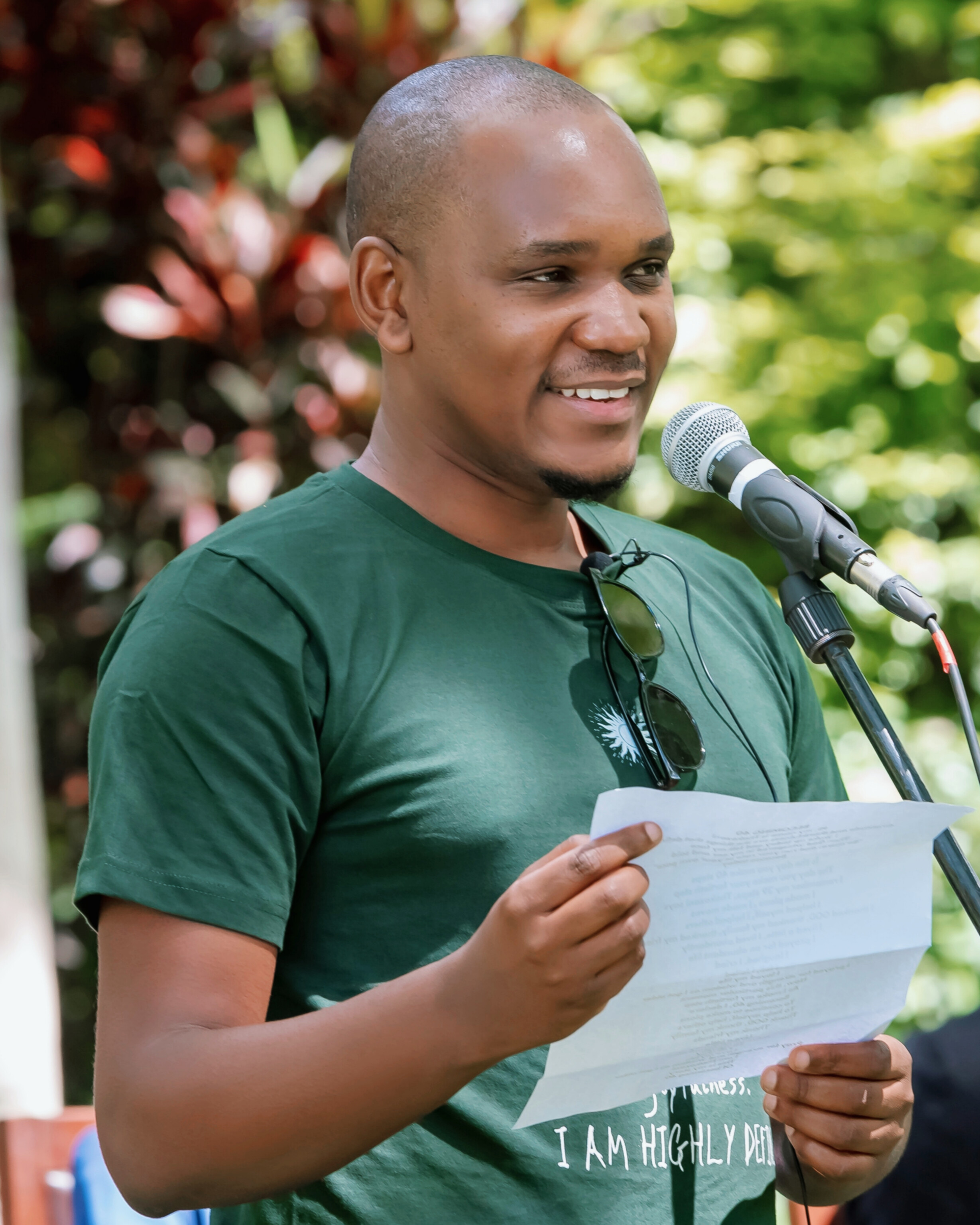
- Shaba in 2021
- Born: 1989 (age 36–37)
- Occupations: Author, poet, spoken word artist, activist
- Writing career
- Genres: Poetry, spoken word, fiction
- Website: tendaishaba.com

Tendai M. Shaba (born 1989) is a Malawian author, poet, activist, and spoken word artist.

== Career ==
=== Literary works ===
Shaba’s literary debut, Moments to Cherish (2020), is a self-published poetry collection exploring self-awareness and emotional healing. His second collection, A Lady in a Yellow Dress (2023), published by Pachulu Publishing, contains 195 poems addressing emotional wellness. In 2024, Shaba released his third collection, Living with the Wildflowers, which focuses on themes of grief, loss, and healing.

In April 2020, Shaba released Realizing Myself, a seven-poem series on self-actualization.

Shaba's debut novel, How to Make Money Grow on Trees, published in 2025, explores themes related to personal finance and financial literacy in an African context.

=== Spoken word and international recognition ===
Shaba is a spoken word performer whose work has been showcased locally and internationally. In 2021, he was featured on Voice of America's Music Time in Africa program, which highlighted his spoken word poetry among African artists.

In March 2024, Shaba appeared on the Commonwealth Poetry Podcast, representing Malawi in its 46th episode.

=== Social advocacy and public engagement ===
In May 2022, Shaba met with Malawi’s Minister of Health, Khumbize Chiponda, to discuss using poetry to promote mental health awareness. In March 2023, he collaborated with former President Joyce Banda on the poem No One Left Behind, released to address gender gaps for International Women’s Day.

== Selected bibliography ==
- Realizing Myself (2020), Self-published. ASIN B086L7B847 (Kindle edition)
- Moments to Cherish (2020), Self-published. ISBN 9798671316841
- A Lady in a Yellow Dress (2023), Pachulu Publishing. ISBN 9789996093470
- Living with the Wildflowers (2024), Pachulu Publishing. ISBN 9789996083303
- How to Make Money Grow on Trees (2025), Pachulu Publishing. ISBN 9789996083327
