= Adélaïde Fassinou =

Beninese writer and Benin's General Secretary for UNESCO

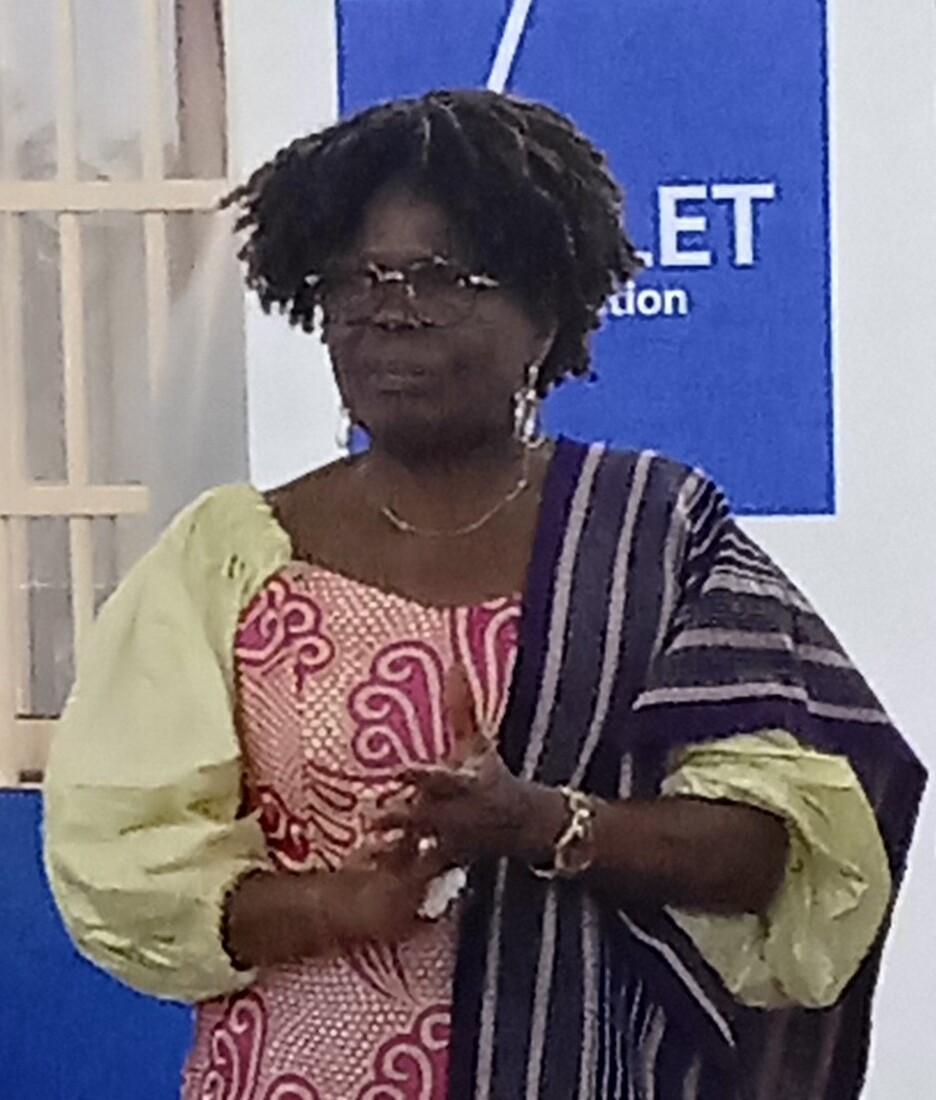
Adélaïde Fassinou

Adélaïde H. Edith Bignon Fassinou (born September 15, 1955, in Porto-Novo) is a Beninese writer and Benin's General Secretary for UNESCO. She has written four novels in French. Her married name is Allagbada.

== Publications ==
- Modukpè, le rêve brisé. Paris: L'Harmattan (Collection Encres Noires no 194), 2000. (130 pp.). ISBN 978-2-7384-9091-9. Novel.
- Yémi ou le miracle de l'amour. Cotonou (Bénin): Editions du Flamboyant, 2000 (142 pp.). ISBN 99919-41-04-5.
- L'Oiseau messager. Cotonou: Editions Ruisseaux d'Afrique, 2002 (24 pp.). ISBN 99919-972-3-7.
- Toute une vie ne suffirait pas pour en parler. Paris: L'Harmattan, 2002 (194 pp.). ISBN 2-7475-3344-1. Nouvelles.
- Enfant d'autrui, fille de personne. Cotonou: Editions du Flamboyant, 2003 (172 pp.). ISBN 99919-41-39-8. Roman.
- Jeté en pâture. Paris: L'Harmattan, 2005 (228 pp.). ISBN 2-7475-8718-5. Roman.
- La petite fille des eaux. Bertoua/Cameroun: Editions Ndzé: 2006 (96 pp.). ISBN 2-911464-12-5. Roman (co-written with 10 other writers).
