= Bhutanese literature =

Published writing of Bhutan

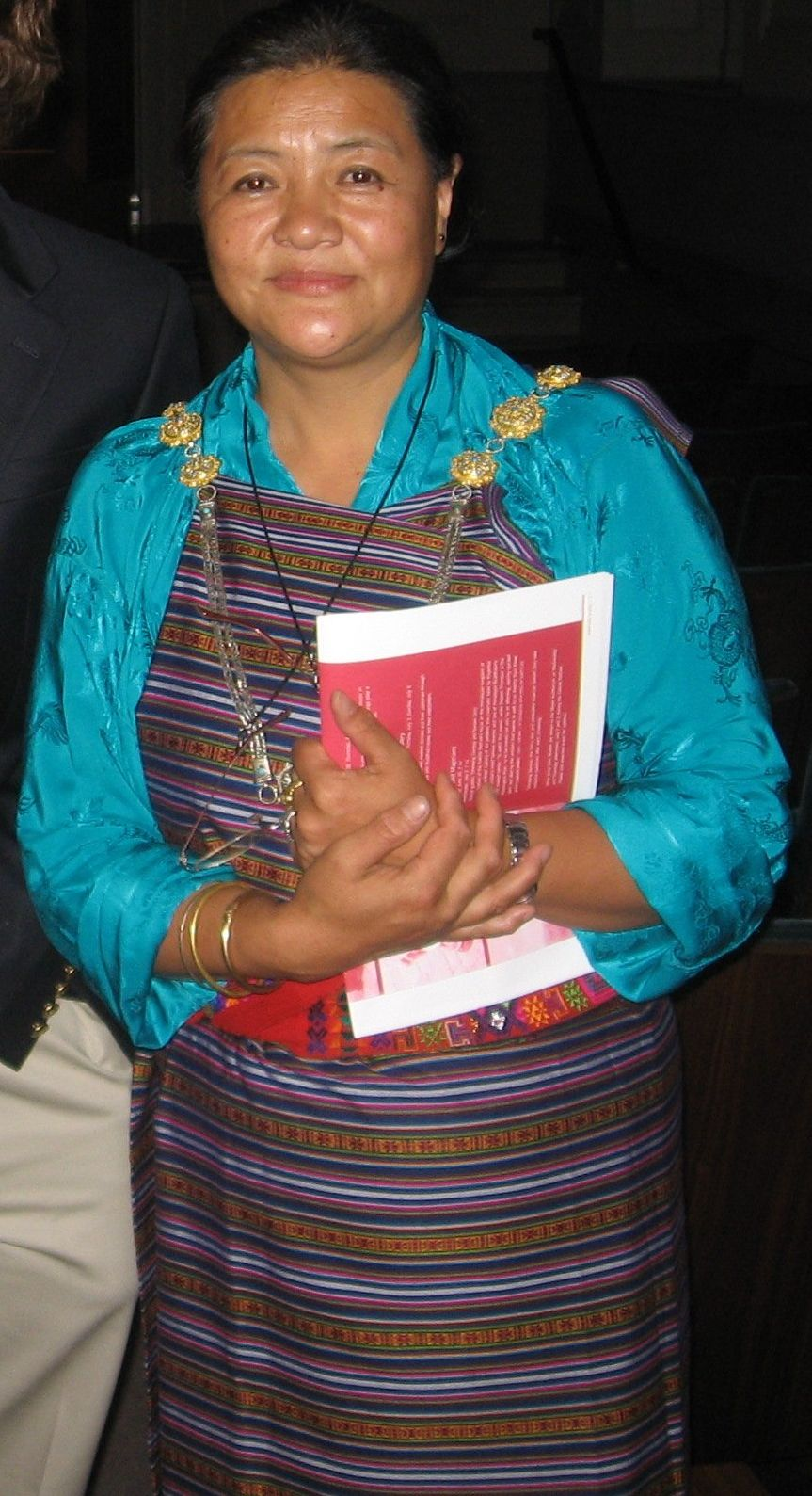
Bhutanese author Kunzang Choden

Bhutanese Literature is written in various languages including Nepali language and Dzongkha in Bhutan. It dates back to the 1950s. Earlier, Bhutanese literature used to be centered on religious teachings, and, now, it is more focused on folklores.

== Development ==
Literature in Bhutan dates back to the 1950s. It is rich and full of folklore, but due to lack of reading culture, it is growing very slowly as compared to other contemporary literatures. New writers are more and more engaged in writing short stories and poems. The traditional Bhutanese Literature had more of Buddhist's teachings and verses, and had a rich tradition of writing biographies of Je Khenpos and Druk Desis.

== Languages ==
In Bhutan, eighteen different languages are spoken; and of those only Dzongkha has a native literary tradition. The other literary languages, Nepali and Lepcha, have not featured in Bhutan's own literature. In Western Bhutan the predominant language is Dzongkha, in the east it is Tshangla and along the southern belt it is Nepali. Several other important regional languages also exist.

Dzongkha is a descendant of Chöke (Classical Tibetan), which was the language of education in Bhutan until the early 1960s.

=== Nepali literature ===
In 1962, Bhutan started to publish Kuensel (first national newspaper) from Madi printing press of Kalimpong, India, and Nepali literature in Bhutan had an opportunity to broaden its area. In those days, Nepali articles written by the writers from, primarily, Kalimpong and Darjeeling used to be published in Kunsel. This provided the interest in Nepali literature to the Nepali speaking southern Bhutanese.

== See also ==
- Bhutanese Nepali literature
