= Son of Woman =

Son of Woman is a postcolonial crime fiction novel by Kenyan writer Charles Mangua, first published in Nairobi, Kenya. It follows Dodge Kiunya, a character that is "returning to a homeland….using an available asset to begin a new career;" a character and story that resonates with the larger population.

== Summary ==
Dodge Kiunya was raised by his prostitute mother until her death, then raised by her prostitute friend before being sent off to the countryside at 11 years of age He eventually graduates college and obtains a civil service job with the Ministry of Labour and Social Services, Dodge's life is "littered with illicit dealings and fast living, climaxing with a bungled robbery." Upon being released from prison, Dodge claims that "Prison didn't change [him]. It hardened [him]." He finds out his childhood friend, Tonia, has been in prison and bails her out. The two then decide that with both of their pasts, they might as well get married and move to Mombasa where nobody knows them.

== Awards ==
The novel has run into 6 reprints, and Mangua published the sequel, Son of Woman in Mombasa, in 1986. Son of Woman won the Jomo Kenyatta Prize for Literature in 1970.

== Criticism ==
It has been argued that Mangua misrepresented Kenyan women and provided them with a bad label, particularly with Dodge's mother and her friend. Nici Nelson argued in his article "Representations of Men and Women, City and Town in Kenyan Novels of the 1970s and 1980s" that "women are often represented in these [Kenyan] novels…manipulating their sexual attractiveness to men to entice, tantalize, and entrap male characters." Tom Odhiambo also argues that in Son of Woman, "the female subject appears most often as the victim, the loser, or the underprivileged," while pointing out that those individuals on the periphery of socioeconomic class in postcolonial Africa "have historically invented means and strategies of survival that perpetually play on the possibilities of success."
