= Florent Couao-Zotti =

Beninese writer

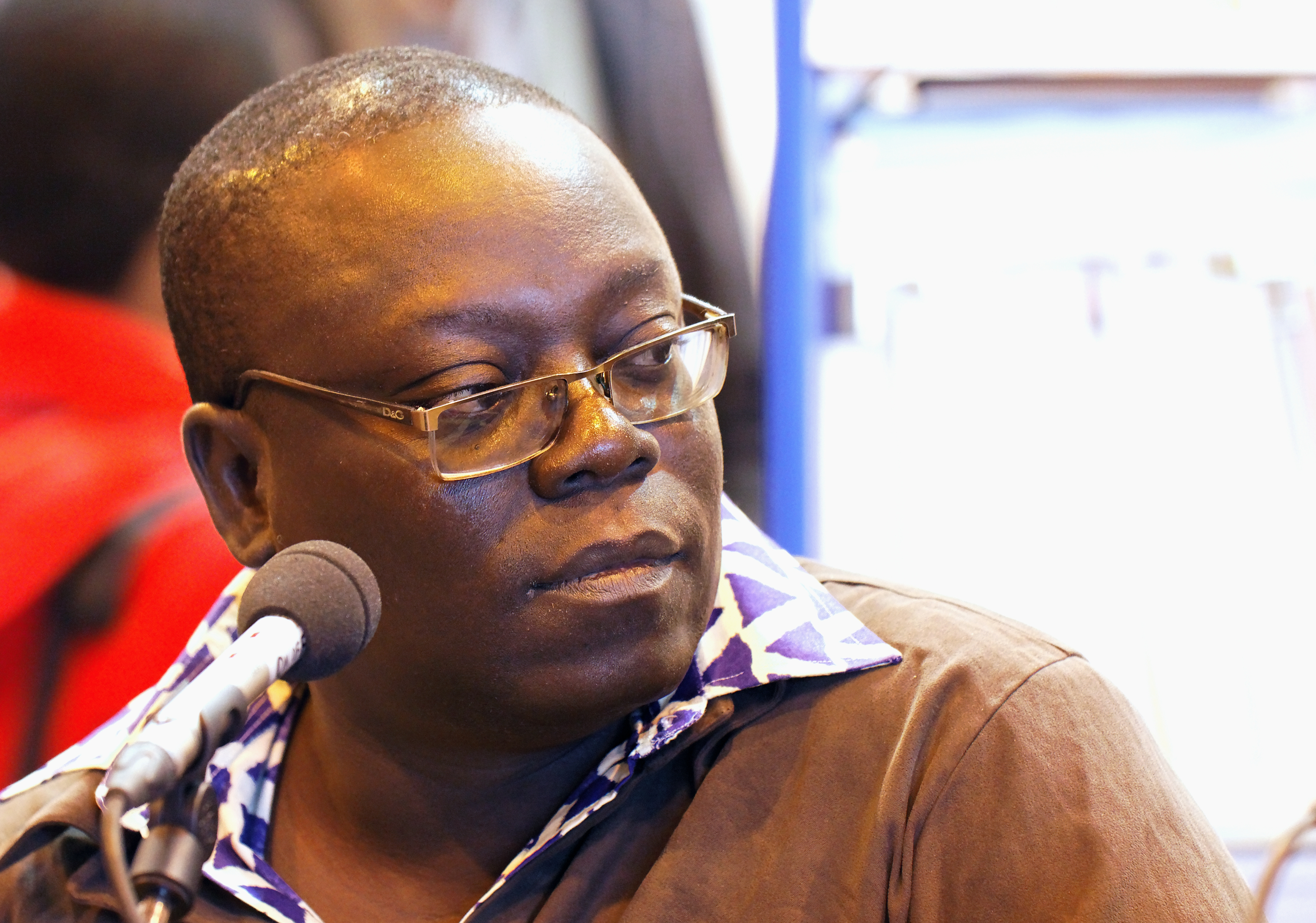
Florent Couao-Zotti (2011).

Florent Couao-Zotti (born 1964) is a writer of comics, plays, and short stories, who lives in Cotonou, Benin. He is fond of employing the short-story as a form. He is also editor of several satirical magazines and a cultural columnist.

== Publications ==
This list is incomplete: please add to it.

- Ce soleil où j’ai toujours soif (play). 1996. ISBN 978-2-7384-2734-2
- Notre pain de chaque jour (play). 1998: Le Serpent à plumes, Paris. ISBN 978-2-84261-042-5
- L'homme dit fou et la mauvaise foi des hommes (short stories). 2000: Le Serpent à plumes, Paris. ISBN 978-2-84261-204-7
- Notre pain de chaque nuit (novel). 2000: J'ai lu, Paris. ISBN 978-2-290-30242-2
- Charly en guerre (youth novel). 2001: Éditions Dapper, 2001. ISBN 978-2-906067-69-1
- La diseuse de mal-espérance (play). 2001. ISBN 978-2-7475-0578-9
- Small hell in Street corners, (short story in Fools, Thieves and other Dreamers). 2001: Weaver Press, Harare.
- La Sirène qui embrassait les étoiles. 2003: L'œil, Paris. ISBN 978-2-912415-63-9
- Le collectionneur de vierges (play). 2004: Editions Ndzé. ISBN 978-2-911464-20-1
- Le Cantique des cannibales. 2004: Le Serpent à plumes, Paris. ISBN 978-2-84261-485-0
- Retour de tombe. 2004: Editions Joca Seria. ISBN 978-2-84809-025-2
- Les Fantômes du Brésil. 2006: UBU éditions. ISBN 978-2-35197-002-7
- 2070 en Sexe Exquis
- Si la cour du mouton est sale, ce n'est pas au porc de le dire. (roman noir) 2010: Editions du Rocher. ISBN 978-2-268-06890-9
- Western Tchoukoutou. 2018: Editions Gallimard. ISBN 9782072780066
- Comment tuer dix fois un criminel…, Lomé (Togo), Continents, 2024, 122 p.
