= Gabonese literature =

Gabonese literature, like many African literatures, began as an oral tradition.

== Colonial writing ==
Many American and European, especially French, writers penned works on Gabon. Père Trilles is one of the main writers of these texts with Mille lieu's dans l'inconnu: de la côte aux rives du Djah (A Thousand Leagues Into the Unknown: From the Coast to the Banks of the Djah).

== See also ==
- Robert Zotoumbat
