= Moses Isegawa =

Ugandan novelist (born 1963)

- Born: Sey Wava; 10 August 1963 (age 63); Kampala, Uganda
- Occupation: Novelist
- Writing career
- Period: 1990s–present
- Genre: Literary fiction

Moses Isegawa, also known as Sey Wava (born 10 August 1963), is a Ugandan author. He has written novels set against the political turmoil of Uganda, which he left in the 1990s for the Netherlands. His debut novel, Abyssinian Chronicles, was first published in Amsterdam in 1998, selling more than 100,000 copies and gaining him widespread national attention. It was also very well reviewed when published in English in the United Kingdom and United States, in 2001. Isegawa became a naturalized Dutch citizen, but he returned to live in Uganda in 2006.

== Early life and education ==
Sey Wava was born to a middle-class Catholic family in Kampala, Uganda. His parents sent him to good schools, and he attended a Catholic seminary and the University of Makerere.

== Career ==
Wava worked as a history teacher before leaving for the Netherlands in 1990 at the age of 27.

When he began publishing his writing formally, he used the pseudonym Moses Isegawa. His first novel, Abyssinian Chronicles, a Bildungsroman set during the 1970s and 1980s, was written in English but first published in Dutch in the Netherlands in 1998. It sold more than 100,000 copies in a nation of 16 million people, creating a stir that earned him an invitation to Parliament and a profile on television. the novel was also very reviewed when published in Engilsh in the United Kingdom and the United states. He became a naturalized Dutch citizen, but he returned to live in Uganda in 2006.

When published in English in 2001 in the UK, Australia and North America, the novel was also generally well received, although its faults were also noted by critics. For instance, Michiko Kakutani of The New York Times wrote: "His story has a strange amoral power, an immediacy and raw energy that capture the chaotic move of his times."

His second novel, Snakepit (1999), was set directly in the years of the dictatorship of Idi Amin. It is an examination of evil and corruption.

Isegawa resided for more than 15 years in Beverwijk, a small town near Amsterdam, and became a naturalized Dutch citizen. He regularly visited Kuala Lumpur, and moved back to Uganda in 2006.

== Works ==
- Abyssinian Chronicles (as Abessijnse kronieken, Amsterdam: 1998; in English, United States: Vintage, 2001; UK: Picador, 2001)
- Snakepit (1999, Netherlands, as Slangenkuil; New York: Alfred A. Knopf, 2004, in English)

== Quotes by Isegawa ==
"Each jubiliating hand hand the pontential to vivisect, each hailing mouth had the power to Condemn someone to Death"

" The skyline, gawking with architectural indigence, towered over the bowl like a row of stained, gap-toothed jawbones."

" Life was a journey of discovery, and character was a variable that kept veering left and right in search of a perfect way for a particular day."

" Words were beaten into weapons."
