= Malama Katulwende =

Zambian author and thinker (born 1967)

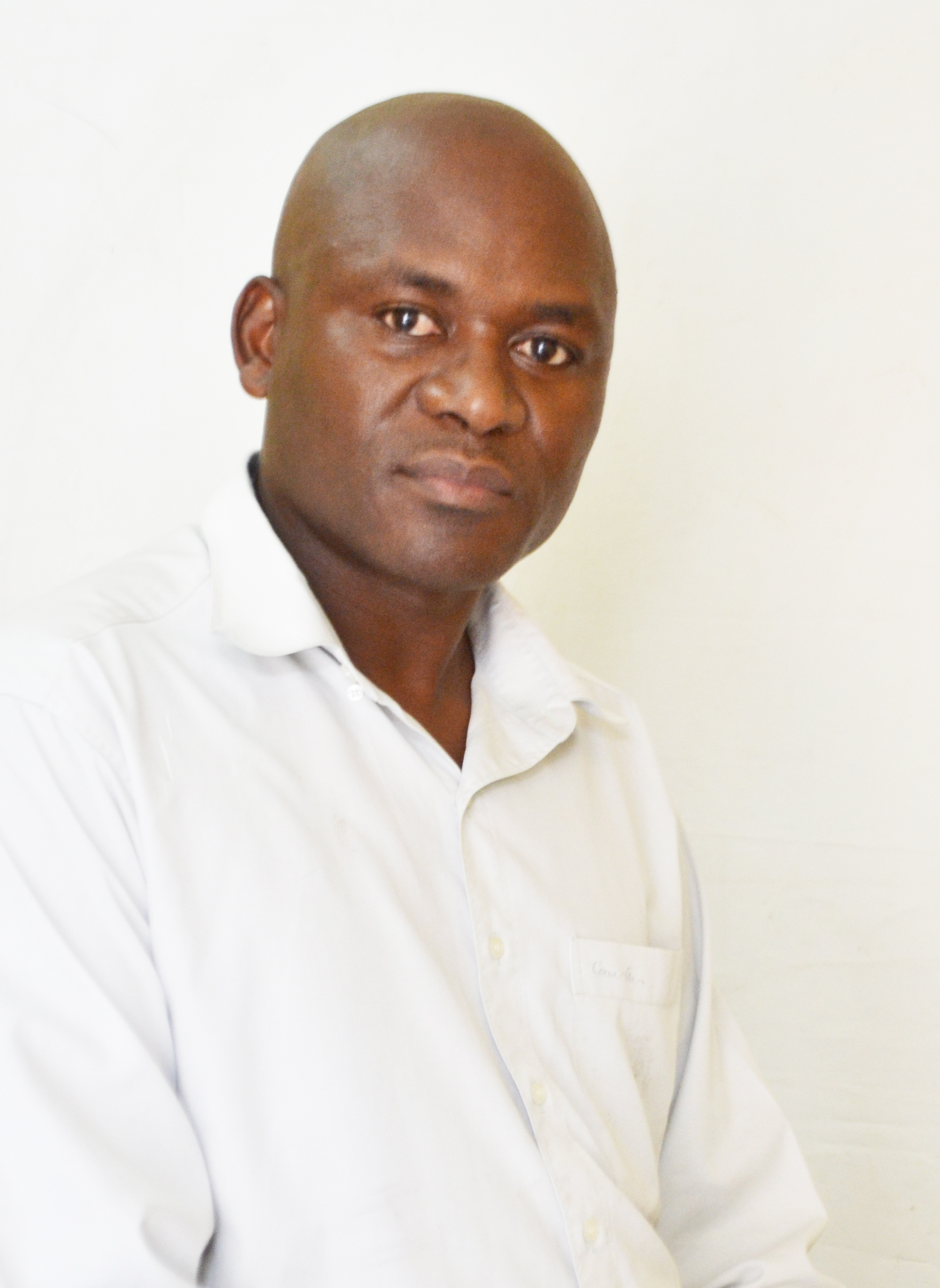
- Born: July 5, 1967 (age 58); Lubwe, Chifunabuli District, Luapula Province of Zambia
- Education: St Charles Lwanga Seminary School, Lubushi Seminary School, University of Zambia (UNZA)
- Occupations: Novelist; poet; essayist
- Awards: Julius Chongo Award 2006 for Best Creative Writing at the Ngoma Awards Ceremony

Malama Katulwende is a Zambian author and thinker, born in the Luapula province. He is a teacher by profession, who got education from catholic seminaries and the University of Zambia (UNZA). He first entered the literary scene in 2001 with poems published in the anthology "Under the African Skies: Poetry from Zambia".

In 2005, Malama Katulwende's novel "Bitterness" was published in the United States, launching him internationally as a promising young African writer. For this novel, he received the 2006 Julius Chongo Best Creative Writer in Zambia award at the Ngoma Awards Ceremony held in Lusaka. The book has also been used in anthropology courses at institutions such as Emory University in Atlanta, Georgia.

In 2011, Malama Katulwende published a collection of philosophical essays titled The Fire at the Core: Discourses on Aesthetics, Music, Jurisprudence, Ethno-Politics, and Good Governance. In these essays, he explored recurring themes of Zambia's underdevelopment and political decadence. Notably, the essays "Why Should We Obey the Law?" and "The Clouds" established him as one of Africa's most profound and compelling thinkers, making his work worthy of study.

His 2018 poetry collection, "Drums of War", further showcased his mastery of the African imagery and solidified his reputation as a distinguished poet.

In addition to his literary achievements, his work at Knowledgegates, which is an Information Technology company he co-founded in 2006, led to the co-writing and publication of the 2014 book Teach Yourself Computers: A Practical Guide to Microsoft Word, Excel, PowerPoint, Publisher, and Internet Applications.

Katulwende is the owner of the Thorn Bird Literary Agency in Lusaka and serves as the editor of The Zambian Teacher, a Zambian magazine.

== Publications ==
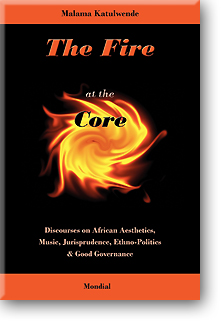
Book cover of Malama Katulwende's "The Fire at the Core"

Books:

- Under the African Skies: Poetry from Zambia, Zambia Women Writers Association (2001), 142 pages.
- Bitterness (novel), New York: Mondial (2005), 288 pages.
- The Fire at the Core: Discourses on Aesthetics, Music, Jurisprudence, Ethno-Politics, and Good Governance (essays), New York: Mondial (2011), 218 pages.
- (with James Kapesa) Teach Yourself Computers: A Practical Guide to Microsoft Word, Excel, PowerPoint, Publisher, and Internet Applications, Lusaka: Mafinga Publishers Limited (2014), 376 pages.
- Drums of War (poetry), AuthorHouseUK (2018), 92 pages.

Other Texts (Selection):

- "Re-evaluating Mwanawasa's Legacy, 3rd Edition." In: Zambian Economist, 13 October 2008.
- "The Lumpa Massacre." In: Zambian Economist, 27 March 2010.
- "A Dogged Abuse of Copyright Rules..." In: Zambian Economist, 29 August 2010.
- Foreword to This Time, Tomorrow: A Compendium of Laboured Voices from the Zambian Komboni – an anthology of poems by the late Mwange Kauseni, edited by Malama Katulwende.
- "Zambia’s Kalindula Music: Death, Drums, and Poetry." In: The Culture Trip, 20 October 2016.
- "Classroom Questions and Their Formulation." In: The Zambian Teacher, 29 January 2018.
- "Schemes of Work." In: The Zambian Teacher, 8 July 2018.
- "Teaching as an Art and as a Science." In: The Zambian Teacher, 8 July 2018.
- "How to Create a Lesson Plan." In: The Zambian Teacher, 26 October 2018.

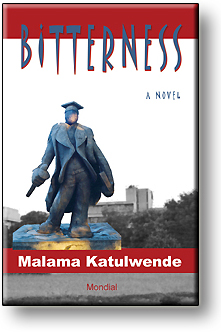
Book cover of Malama Katulwende's novel "Bitterness"
