= Literature of Sierra Leone =

Literature of Sierra Leone is the collection of written and spoken work, mostly fictional, from Sierra Leone. The coastal west-African country suffered a civil war from 1991 until 2002. Before the civil war, Sierra Leone had many writers contributing to its literature and since the end of the war the country has been in the process of rebuilding this literature. This is an overview of some important aspects of the literature of Sierra Leone before, during, and after the war.

== Some notable authors ==
Eustace Palmer is Sierra Leonean by birth. He has taught at the University of Texas at Austin, at Randolph Macon Woman's College, and as a Professor of English at Fourah Bay College, University of Sierra Leone. Currently, he teaches at Georgia College & State University. Palmer is an author and a literary critic. He was President of the African Literature Association (ALA) from 2006 to 2007. He is the recipient of the ALA's Distinguished Member award as well as the Georgia College & State University's Distinguished Professor Award. Palmer has many published books of literary criticism, including Studies in the English Novel, An Introduction to the African Novel, The Growth of the African Novel, Of War and Women Oppression and Optimism: New Essays on the African Novel and Knowledge is More Than Mere Words: A Critical Introduction to Sierra Leonean Literature. Palmer is also the author of the novels A Hanging is Announced, Canfira's Travels, A Tale of Three Women and A Pillar of the Community.

Wilfred "Freddy Will" Kanu Jr. is an author and hip hop recording artist, a naturalized American, and a diplomat in Brussels, Kingdom of Belgium. He was born in Brookfields, Freetown, Sierra Leone, and he attended Christ the King College in Bo, Methodist Boys High School, and Ansarul Muslim Secondary School in Freetown, Sierra Leone. He was further educated at Raritan Valley Community College, where he studied Theater Arts and Edison Job Corps Academy, where he studied Accounting and Hospitality. He also underwent training in Phlebotomy at Robert Wood Johnson University Hospital and Advanced Paramedic Care at Trillium College in Burlington Ontario, Canada. Kanu has authored twelve books on history, philosophy, biography, poetry, personal development, and geopolitics. He also writes and publishes a blog.

Karamoh Kabba is another well known author in Sierra Leone. He founded Sierra Youth Lending Hand as a means to help youth rehabilitate after the war, and he is the organization's President and Chief Executive Officer. Kabba has published three books: A Mother's Saga: An Account of the Rebel War in Sierra Leone, Lion Mountain: A Perilous Evolution of the Dens and Morquee: A Political Drama of Wish over Wisdom. He has published the poem "Poverty amidst Gold and Diamonds" and has written many other poems on Sierra Leone Web, a site dedicated to publishing poems.

Adelaide Casely Hayford was a writer, a feminist, and a cultural nationalist long before the civil war in Sierra Leone. She started a school for girls in Freetown called the Girls Vocational School, which was devoted to helping prepare girls for their lives as women. Adelaide Casely Hayford was a prominent public speaker and made many addresses in her lifetime. In addition to her vocal spread of ideas, she wrote a number of short stories, including "Savages?", "Mista Courifer", "Kobina, A Little African Boy", "Two West African Simpletons", and "A Black and White Encounter, A Tale of Long Ago".

Gladys Casely Hayford was the daughter of Adelaide Casely Hayford and was considered a more prominent writer than her mother. Gladys Hayford was not only a writer but also a musician, a dramatist, and a poet. Her most notable poems include "Creation" published in 1926, "Nativity" published in 1927, and "The Serving Girl" published in 1941. Hayford taught at the school that her mother founded in Sierra Leone.

Syl Cheney-Coker, born in Freetown, Sierra Leone, was a journalist, an editor and a publisher as well as writing poetry and novels. He was the winner of the 1991 Commonwealth Writers Prize, Africa Region. His poem "Ghetto Woman" is highly discussed for its reflection of the Negritude movement. He has published three collections of poetry: Concerto for an Exile, published in 1973; The Graveyard Also Has Teeth with Concerto for an Exile, published in 1980; and The Blood in the Desert's Eyes, published in 1990. He has one published novel, The Last Harmattan of Alusine Dunbar (1990).

Winston Forde was born in Freetown, Sierra Leone. He was trained as a flight cadet at the Royal Air Force College and began a career as a pilot. During his years of work and after his retirement he was an avid writer. Most of his writing is fiction that he based on real life experiences in an attempt to address some of the taboos of Sierra Leonean culture. Forde's published titles include Air Force Cadet, The Runaway, Airborne Soldiers, Reflections on our Independence and Aden to Bliss. He wrote at least one play and, inspired by his schooling in geography, he wrote The Story of Mining in Sierra Leone.

Elvis Gbanabom Hallowell is an established Sierra Leonean poet who has recently branched into storytelling. Aside from his writing, Hallowell is the founder and Executive Director of the project Save Heritage and Rehabilitate the Environment. He is also the Director-General of The Sierra Leone Broadcasting Corporation. His works of poetry include A Little After Dawn; Drumbeats of War; My Immigrant Blood; and Manscape in the Sierra: New and Collected Poems 1991-2011. Hallowell's venires into storytelling include the publishing of Tears of the Sweet Peninsula: May 25, 1997; The Sierra Leone Civil Conflict; and The Lust of Cain.

Ambrose Massaquoi's poetry has been published extensively in Sierra Leonean anthologies and international journals, including Kalashnikov in the Sun, Songs that Pour the Heart, Leoneanthology, The Iowa Review and 100 Words. In 1994, he became the third Sierra Leonean after Syl Cheney-Coker and Yulisa Amadu Madi to participate in Iowa University's prestigious International Writing Program. Massaquoi is an alumnus of Christ the King College in Bo, Fourah Bay College in Freetown, and the International Graduate School of Leadership in the Philippines. Apart from poetry, Massaquoi has published stories and was at a time involved in the Sierra Leonean music scene as a multi-instrumentalist, lead singer, and founder/leader of a gospel band. He has also performed in local adaptations of stage plays like Julius Caesar and Volpone on the platform of his secondary school and university drama groups. Massaquoi presently lives with his family in Nigeria where he heads Africa Centre for Theological Studies. Along the Peal of Drums is his first poetry collection.

Lucilda Hunter was born in Freetown, Sierra Leone. She was trained and worked as a librarian for most of her life. After her retirement, she was named a Fellow of the British Library Association, which has since been renamed The Chartered Institute of Library and Information Professionals. Throughout her life, she wrote under the name Yema Lucilda Hunter. Her novels include Road to Freedom, Bittersweet, Redemption Song and Joy Came in the Morning. Hunter also published an autobiography entitled An African Treasure: In Search of Gladys Casely-Hayford.

Shiekh Umarr Kamarah is both a poet and a linguist. He has worked as a lecturer at Fourah Bay College, the University of Sierra Leone and at the University of Wisconsin at Madison and was a professor at Virginia State University. He is a Consultant on Language Analysis for the Federal Department of Immigration in Switzerland and is an External Examiner in Linguistics at the University of Sierra Leone. Kamarah is also a member of the Linguistic Society of America, the Association of Forensic Linguistics, the International Language and Law Association and of the African Literature Association. Furthermore, he serves on the editorial board for the Sierra Leonean Writers Series and on the editorial board of the Africana Bulletin, journal of the University of Sierra Leone. Kamarah's poetry is collected in two volumes; the first entitled The Child of War was published in 2000 and the second, Singing in Exile, was published in 2002.

Dr. Siaka Kroma is a graduate of the University of Sierra Leone, University of Edinburgh and the University of Toronto. He taught in secondary schools and universities in Sierra Leone and the United States till retirement. He lives in Nairobi, Kenya, and travels regularly to Sierra Leone. He is best known for his works Gomna's Children, A Corner of Time, Manners Maketh Man, Climbing Lilies and Tales from the Fireside: Oral Narratives Retold for Young Readers.

== Civil war literature ==
There are many works of literature that relate to the civil war in Sierra Leone. Of these, Ishmael Beah's account of having been a child soldier himself is among the most popular. His book A Long Way Gone: Memoirs of a Boy Soldier tells a story that many children in Sierra Leone faced during the war. He is also the Founder and President of The Ishmael Beah Foundation, which is aimed at giving youth better vocational skills through study.

Another important piece of literature that relates to the civil war is Black Man's Grave: Letters from Sierra Leone. This book is a collection of letters written in Sierra Leone during the civil war and together they depict many aspects of the suffering that took place. It is similar to other works written about civil war in Africa; however, the personal letters provide a more moving emotional experience for the reader.

== Non-fiction ==
Non-fiction literature also plays an important role in the Sierra Leone society. Sierra Leone is home to a number of schools and universities that rely on academic literature in addition to traditional fiction literature. Sierra Leonean non-fiction authors include the following:

Joe A. D. Alie, born in Moyamba, Sierra Leone, is a professor at Fourah Bay College, the University of Sierra Leone. He has published a number of textbooks, including A New History of Sierra Leone and A Concise Guide to Writing College and Research Papers.

Osman A. Sankoh was born in Warima, Sierra Leone. He has been awarded the 1987 University of Sierra Leone Prize for Academic Excellence as well as the 1996 German Academic Exchange Service Prize for Academic Excellence and Exceptional Social Engagements by a Foreign Student. In 2007, he became the Executive Director of the INDEPTH Network. He has had work on a variety of topics published in Tropical Medicine and International Health, Journal of Public Health, Global Health Action, The International Journal of Epidemiology, African Journal of Environmental Assessment and Management, The Journal of Environmental Management and Environmental Impact Assessment Review. Sankoh has also done some work on creative writing in Hybrid Eyes - Reflections of an African in Europe and Beautiful Colours - Reflections on the Problem of Racism.

Aisha Fofana Ibrahim is a feminist scholar, who is the Director of the Institute for Gender Research and Documentation at Fourah Bay College, the University of Sierra Leone. She is also an executive member of the 50/50 Group, a group in support of women's empowerment. Her published works include her dissertation, entitled "Wars other Voices: Testimonies by Sierra Leonean Women", along with other works such as her "Introduction: Everyday Life in Postwar Sierra Leone" and The Integration of a Gender Perspective in the Sierra Leone Police.

== Children's literature ==
Children's literature in Sierra Leone has played a large role in the country's postwar development of the country. PEN Sierra Leone, a branch of PEN International, has been working to develop the publishing industry since the civil war. Working in conjunction with the Canadian Organization for Development through Education, these organizations have created the Reading Sierra Leone Collection. This is a collection of children's books written at a number of different levels that have storylines relating to things children in Sierra Leone experience. The books are all written and illustrated by Sierra Leoneans. The plots range from developing social ties, to staying out of trouble, and even to the problems faced by children who have been orphaned in the war. This collection contains the titles Tibujang Must Not Come by Mohamed Sheriff; Amidu's Day Off by Foday M. B. Sawi; City Girl by Jacqueline Leigh; Gbargbartee and Tumbu by Sam C. K. Jarlwood; Yamah and the Tumbeke Project by Nathaniel A. Pearce; Sia and the Magic Basket by Theresa Amui; Our Bird by Rainny Richard Ansumana; and A Hunting Trip by Ahmed Din-Gabisi. Memunatu Bangura,
