= OkadaBooks =

Self-publishing platform

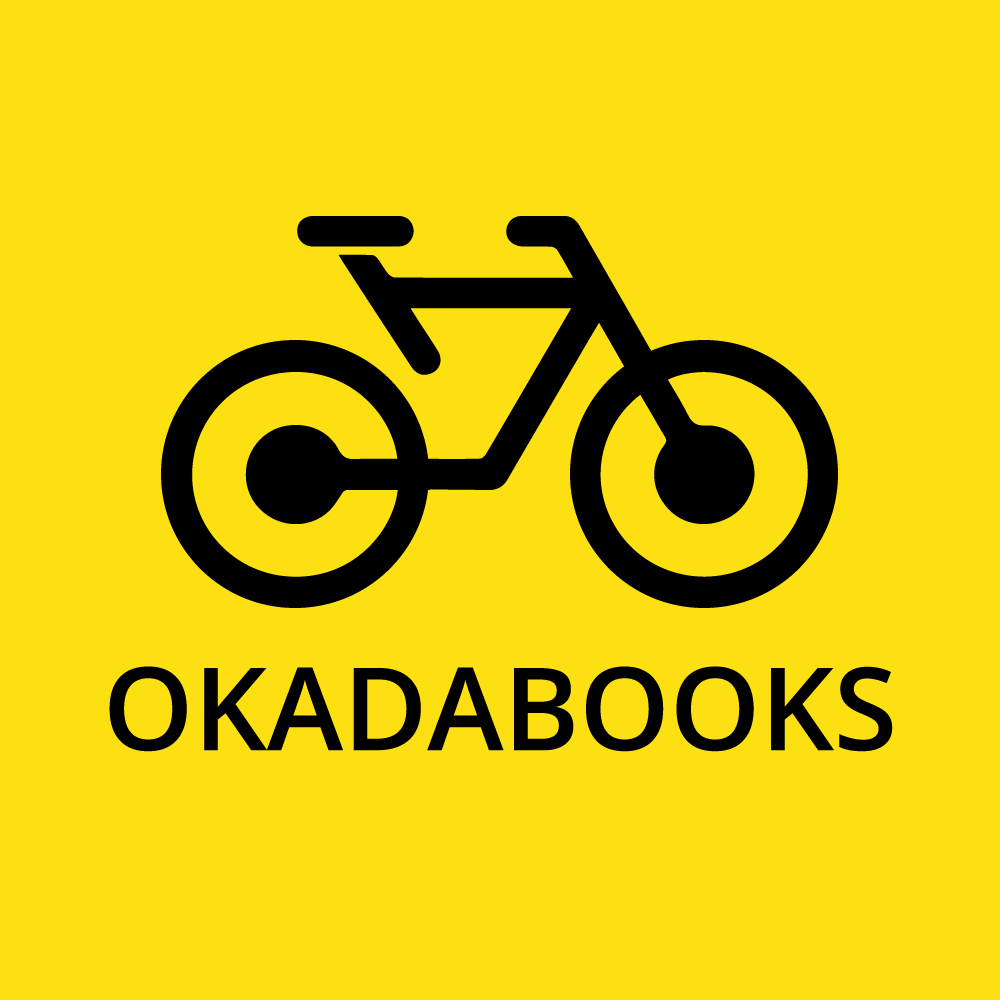
- OkadaBooks logo
- Company type: Internet company
- Website type: Reading app, self-publishing
- Available in: English
- Dissolved: 30 November 2023; 2 years ago
- Headquarters: Yaba, Lagos, Lagos State, Nigeria
- Area served: Worldwide
- Owner: OkadaBooks
- Founder: Okechukwu Ofili
- Website: okadabooks.com
- Registration: Required
- Launched: 2013 (13 years ago)
- Current status: Defunct
- Native clients on: Android, iOS, Web

OkadaBooks was a self-publishing and bookselling platform based in Nigeria, founded by Okechukwu Ofili in 2013. It was selected by Google's "Google for Start-up Accelerator" in 2017. In 2018, it hosted a writing competition in partnership with Guaranty Trust Bank called "Dusty Manuscript".

== History ==
OkadaBooks was founded by Okechukwu Ofili in 2013. The name is a combination of okada – a motorcycle taxi typically used to circumvent traffic in Nigeria and other West African countries – and books. The platform was started when the founder was still an author at BellaNaija and YNaija, and was frustrated at the fact that bookshops were not paying him for books already sold. OkadaBooks offers books as mobile phone downloads.

On 30 November 2023, the platform was closed with the owners citing "insurmountable challenges" as the reason.
