= Literature of Djibouti =

The literature of Djibouti has a longstanding poetic tradition. Several well-developed Somali forms of verse include the gabay, jiifto, geeraar, wiglo, buraanbur, beercade, afarey and guuraw. The gabay (epic poem) has the most complex length and meter, often exceeding 100 lines. It is considered the mark of poetic attainment when a young poet is able to compose such verse, and is considered the height of poetry. Groups of memorizers and reciters (hafidayaal) traditionally propagated the well-developed art form. Poems revolve around several main themes, including baroorodiiq (elegy), amaan (praise), jacayl (romance), guhaadin (diatribe), digasho (gloating) and guubaabo (guidance). The baroorodiiq is composed to commemorate the death of a prominent poet or figure. The Afar are familiar with the ginnili, a kind of warrior-poet and diviner, and have a rich oral tradition of folk stories. They also have an extensive repertoire of battle songs.

Additionally, Djibouti has a long tradition of Islamic literature. Among the most prominent such historical works is the medieval Futuh al-Habasha by Shihāb al-Dīn, which chronicles the Adal Sultanate army's conquest of Abyssinia during the 16th century. In recent years, a number of politicians and intellectuals have also penned memoirs or reflections on the country.
