= Lesotho literature =

Notable authors in the African kingdom of Lesotho include Moroesi Akhionbare (1945–2020 ), Thomas Mofolo (1876–1948), Caroline Ntseliseng Khaketla (1918–2012), Mzamane Nhlapo and Mpho 'M'atsepo Nthunya.

Only a limited amount of Lesotho literature is available in the English language. Among these works is Chaka (1931)—the most famous novel by the writer Thomas Mofolo. Written in Sesotho, it tells the story of the rise and fall of a Zulu emperor-king. It was named one of the twelve best works of African literature of the 20th century by a panel organized by Ali Mazrui. The book has been translated into English twice.
