= Malian literature =

Malian literature is the literature of Mali.

== Early Malian literature ==
The ruler of the Songhai Empire at the time, Askia the Great was a patron of literature. According to the 16th-century Moroccan explorer Leo Africanus, writing in 1510 CE,

In Timbuktu there are numerous judges, doctors and clerics, all receiving good salaries from the king. He pays great respect to men of learning. There is a big demand for books in manuscript, imported from Barbary (North Africa). More profit is made from the book trade than from any other line of business.

== Modern Malian literature ==
Though Mali's literature is less famous than its music, Mali has always been one of Africa's liveliest intellectual centers. Mali's literary tradition is largely oral, with jalis reciting or singing histories and stories from scared texts. Amadou Hampâté Bâ, Mali's best-known historian, spent much of his life recording the oral traditions of his own Fula teachers, as well as those of Bambara and other Mande neighbors.

The best-known novel by a Malian writer is Yambo Ouologuem's Le devoir de violence, which won the 1968 Prix Renaudot but whose legacy was marred by accusations of plagiarism. It is a dark history of a loosely disguised Bambara Empire, focused on slavery, injustice and suffering.

Massa Makan Diabaté, a descendant of griots, is known in the Francophone world for his work on The Epic of Sundiata as well as his "Kouta trilogy," a series of realist novels loosely based on contemporary life in his hometown of Kita. A griot is a traditional story-teller. Other well-known Malian writers include Modibo Sounkalo Keita, Maryse Condé (a native of the French Antilles, has made a career writing about the Bamabara people from whom she descends), Moussa Konaté, and Fily Dabo Sissoko.

Ousmane Sembène, a Wolof Senegalese novelist, set half of his novel God's Bits of Wood in Bamako.

== See also ==
- List of Malian writers
- Media of Mali
