= 1977 in literature =

This article contains information about the literary events and publications of 1977.

== Events ==
- January 21 – The Times Literary Supplement runs an article in which high-profile writers and academics name their most underrated and overrated books or authors of the previous 75 years (the lifetime of the UK publication). Novelist Barbara Pym is chosen as the most underrated writer by both Philip Larkin and Lord David Cecil, being the only person to be selected by two contributors. On the strength of this, literary interest in Pym is revived after 16 years of non-publication.
- February 20 – An episode of Doctor on the Go, co-written by Douglas Adams and Graham Chapman, marks the beginning of Adams' career as a writer for BBC radio.
- March 4 – Andrés Caicedo commits suicide by overdose, aged 25, about a month after the publication of his novel ¡Que viva la música! ("Let Music Live!", translated as Liveforever) in his home town of Cali, Colombia.
- April 27 – Héctor Germán Oesterheld, Argentine comic book writer born 1919), is kidnapped by the military authorities; he is believed to have died in detention a few months later.
- July 11 – The English magazine Gay News is found guilty of blasphemous libel for publishing a homoerotic poem, "The Love That Dares to Speak Its Name" by James Kirkup, in a case (Whitehouse v Lemon) at the Old Bailey in London, on behalf of Mary Whitehouse's National Viewers and Listeners Association. John Mortimer appears for the defence. It is the first such prosecution since 1921 and will be the last before the offense is abolished in 2008.
- September 15 – Christopher Tolkien, with Guy Gavriel Kay, completes and publishes his late father's work, The Silmarillion.
- Fall – Philosophy and Literature appears as an academic journal founded at Johns Hopkins University. It explores connections between literary and philosophical studies, presenting ideas on the aesthetics of literature, critical theory, and the philosophical interpretation of literature.
- October – Norman Mailer punches Gore Vidal in the face at a New York City party.
- December 31 – Ngũgĩ wa Thiong'o and Ngugi wa Mirii are detained in Kamiti Maximum Security Prison, Kenya, six weeks after the première of their political Kikuyu language play Ngaahika Ndeenda (I Will Marry When I Want) at the open-air Kamiriithu Community Education and Cultural Centre. While imprisoned, Ngũgĩ will write the first modern novel in Kikuyu, Devil on the Cross (Caitaani mũtharaba-Inĩ), on prison-issue toilet paper.

== New books ==
=== Fiction ===
- Ales Adamovich, Janka Bryl and Uladzimir Kalesnik – Я из огненной деревни (Belarusian: Я з вогненнай вёскі; Out of the Fire)
- Jorge Amado – Tieta do Agreste
- Eric Ambler – Send No More Roses
- Jay Anson – The Amityville Horror
- Margaret Atwood – Dancing Girls
- Richard Bach – Illusions
- Richard Bachman – Rage
- Leland Bardwell – Girl on a Bicycle
- Caroline Blackwood – Great Granny Webster
- Gerd Brantenberg – Egalias døtre (The Daughters of Egalia, 1985, also Egalia's Daughters, 1986)
- Terry Brooks – The Sword of Shannara
- Andrés Caicedo – ¡Que viva la música!
- J. M. Coetzee – In the Heart of the Country
- Robin Cook – Coma
- Robert Coover – The Public Burning
- Basil Copper – And Afterward, the Dark
- L. Sprague de Camp
  - The Hostage of Zir
  - The Queen of Zamba
- L. Sprague de Camp and Lin Carter – Conan of Aquilonia
- Edmund Crispin – The Glimpses of the Moon
- Michel Déon – The Foundling's War
- Kay Dick – They: a sequence of unease
- Philip K. Dick – A Scanner Darkly
- Joan Didion – A Book of Common Prayer
- Buchi Emecheta – The Slave Girl
- Howard Fast – The Immigrants
- Timothy Findley – The Wars
- Leon Forrest – The Bloodworth Orphans
- John Fowles – Daniel Martin
- Marilyn French – The Women's Room
- Jane Gardam – Bilgewater
- Helen Garner – Monkey Grip
- Pauline Gedge – Child of the Morning
- Richard Gordon – The Invisible Victory
- Günter Grass – The Flounder (Der Butt)
- Mark Helprin – Refiner's Fire
- Hammond Innes – The Big Footprints
- Elias Khoury – الجبل الصغير (al-Jabal al-saghir, The Little Mountain)
- Stephen King – The Shining
- Derek Lambert – Blackstone on Broadway
- John le Carré – The Honourable Schoolboy
- Ernest Lehman – The French Atlantic Affair
- Robert Ludlum – The Chancellor Manuscript
- Brian Lumley – The Horror at Oakdeene and Others
- Ngaio Marsh – Last Ditch
- George R. R. Martin – Dying of the Light
- Colleen McCullough – The Thorn Birds
- Larry McMurtry – Terms of Endearment
- Robert Merle – Fortune de France
- Toni Morrison – Song of Solomon
- Guido Morselli - Dissipatio H. G. (posthumous)
- Iris Murdoch – The Sea, the Sea
- Péter Nádas – The End of a Family Story
- John Neal – The Genius of John Neal: Selections from His Writings (edited by Benjamin Lease and Hans-Joachim Lang)
- Patrick O'Brian – The Mauritius Command
- Ellis Peters – A Morbid Taste for Bones
- Barbara Pym – Quartet in Autumn
- Ruth Rendell – A Judgement in Stone
- Alun Richards – Ennal's Point
- Harold Robbins – Dreams Die First
- Paul Scott – Staying On
- Erich Segal – Oliver's Story
- Irwin Shaw – Beggarman, Thief
- M. P. Shiel – Prince Zaleski and Cummings King Monk
- Sidney Sheldon – Bloodline
- Leslie Marmon Silko – Ceremony
- Botho Strauß – Devotion
- Remy Sylado – Gali Lobang Gila Lobang
- Craig Thomas – Firefox
- J. R. R. Tolkien (died 1973) – The Silmarillion
- Melvin Van Peebles – The True American, A Folk Fable
- Mario Vargas Llosa – Aunt Julia and the Scriptwriter (La tía Julia y el escribidor)
- P. G. Wodehouse (died 1975) – Sunset at Blandings
- Christopher Wood – James Bond, the Spy Who Loved Me

=== Children and young people ===
- Chinua Achebe
  - The Drum
  - The Flute
- Richard Adams
  - The Plague Dogs
  - The Ship's Cat
- Sandra Boynton – Hippos Go Berserk!
- Helen Cresswell – The Bagthorpe Saga
- Willi Glasauer – Le Journal Enseveli (The Buried Newspaper)
- Rumer Godden – The Rocking Horse Secret
- Shirley Hughes – Dogger
- Diana Wynne Jones – Charmed Life
- Ruth Manning-Sanders – A Book of Enchantments and Curses
- C. L. Moore (with Alicia Austin) – Black God's Shadow
- Daniel Pinkwater - The Big Orange Splot
- Daniel Pinkwater and Jill Pinkwater - The Hoboken Chicken Emergency
- Maurice Sendak – Seven Little Monsters
- Barbara Smucker – Underground to Canada (also Runaway to Freedom: A Story of the Underground Railway)
- Peter Spier – Noah's Ark
- Judith Viorst – Alexander, Who Used to be Rich Last Sunday

=== Drama ===
- Robert Bolt – State of Revolution
- Roger Hall – Middle-Age Spread
- Tony Harrison (adapter) – The Mysteries
- Mike Leigh – Abigail's Party
- Heiner Müller – Die Hamletmaschine (written)
- Mary O'Malley – Once a Catholic
- Dennis Potter – Brimstone and Treacle
- Ngũgĩ wa Thiong'o and Ngugi wa Mirii – Ngaahika Ndeenda
- John Wells – The Immortal Haydon

=== Poetry ===
- Frank Belknap Long – In Mayan Splendor

=== Non-fiction ===
- Wendell Berry – The Unsettling of America: Culture and Agriculture
- Alfred D. Chandler, Jr. – The Visible Hand: The Managerial Revolution in American Business
- Bruce Chatwin – In Patagonia
- Robert Coles – Children of Crisis
  - vol. 4, Eskimos, Indians, Chicanos
  - vol. 5, The Privileged Ones: The Well-off and the Rich in America
- Esther Deans – Esther Deans' Gardening Book: Growing Without Digging
- Len Deighton – Fighter: the True Story of the Battle of Britain
- Patrick Leigh Fermor – A Time Of Gifts
- Jim Fixx – The Complete Book of Running
- Simon Goodenough - Military Miniatures
- Robert B. Gottlieb – Thinking Big
- Michael Herr – Dispatches
- Edith Holden (died 1920) – The Country Diary of an Edwardian Lady
- R. C. Majumdar – The History and Culture of the Indian People, vol. 11
- Bharati Mukherjee and Clark Blaise – Days and Nights in Calcutta
- V. S. Naipaul – India: A Wounded Civilization
- David M. Potter – The Impending Crisis, 1848–1861
- E. F. Schumacher – A Guide for the Perplexed
- A. T. Q. Stewart – The Narrow Ground: Aspects of Ulster 1609–1969
- Lawrence Stone – The Family, Sex and Marriage in England, 1500–1800
- Peter Ustinov – Dear Me

== Births ==
- February 21 – Jonathan Safran Foer, American novelist
- March 4 – Dan Wells, American horror and science fiction author
- May 2 – Alessandro D'Avenia, Italian writer
- July 18 – Alfian Sa'at, Singaporean writer, poet and playwright
- August 24 – John Green, American author and YouTube vlogger
- October 16 – Laura Wade, English playwright
- September 5 – Tena Štivičić, Croatian playwright
- September 15 – Chimamanda Ngozi Adichie, Nigerian novelist
- November 12 – Richelle Mead, American young-adult novelist

== Deaths ==
- January 5 – Artur Adson, Estonian poet, writer and theatre critic (b. 1889)
- January 14 – Anaïs Nin, French-Cuban erotic novelist and diarist (born 1903)
- January 18 – Carl Zuckmayer, German playwright (born 1896)
- January 26 – William Glynne-Jones, Welsh novelist and children's writer (born 1907)
- February 19 – Anthony Crosland, British author and politician (born 1918)
- February 27 – John Dickson Carr, American crime novelist (born 1906)
- March 4
  - Andrés Caicedo, Colombian novelist and cinéaste (suicide, born 1951)
  - Mihai Gafița, Romanian editor, literary historian and children's novelist (killed in earthquake, born 1923)
  - Alexandru Ivasiuc, Romanian novelist (killed in earthquake, born 1933)
- March 15 – Hubert Aquin, French Canadian novelist, essayist and political activist (suicide, born 1929))
- April 7 – Jim Thompson, American fiction writer (born 1906)
- April 11 – Jacques Prévert, French poet and screenwriter (born 1900)
- May 9 – James Jones, American novelist (heart failure, born 1921)
- July 2 – Vladimir Nabokov, Russian/American novelist (born 1899)
- July 15 – Konstantin Fedin, Russian writer (born 1892)
- July 20 – Friedrich Georg Jünger, German writer (born 1898)
- August 13 – Henry Williamson, English naturalist and novelist (born 1895)
- August 20 – Gurbaksh Singh, Punjabi novelist (born 1914)
- August 26 – H. A. Rey, German-born American children's writer and illustrator (born 1898)
- September 1 – Ștefan Tita, Romanian polygraph and journalist activist (born 1905)
- September 4 – E. F. Schumacher, German-born economist (born 1911)
- September 12 – Robert Lowell, American poet (heart attack, born 1917)
- October 27 – James M. Cain, American novelist and newspaperman (born 1892)
- November 10 – Dennis Wheatley, English occult novelist (born 1897)
- November 30
  - Miloš Crnjanski, Serbian poet and novelist (born 1893)
  - Terence Rattigan, English dramatist (bone cancer, born 1911)
- December 9 – Clarice Lispector, Brazilian novelist (ovarian cancer, born 1920)
- December 22 – Frank Thiess, German novelist (born 1890)

== Awards ==
- Nobel Prize in Literature: Vicente Aleixandre

=== Canada ===
- 1977 Governor General's Awards

=== France ===
- Prix Goncourt: Didier Decoin, John l'enfer
- Prix Médicis:
  - French: Michel Butel, L'Autre Amour
  - International: Héctor Bianciotti, Le Traité des saisons – Argentina

=== Spain ===
- Premio Miguel de Cervantes: Alejo Carpentier

=== United Kingdom ===
- Booker Prize: Paul Mark Scott, Staying On
- Carnegie Medal for children's literature: Gene Kemp, The Turbulent Term of Tyke Tiler
- Eric Gregory Award: Tony Flynn, Michael Vince, David Cooke, Douglas Marshall, Melissa Murray
- James Tait Black Memorial Prize for fiction: John le Carré, The Honourable Schoolboy
- James Tait Black Memorial Prize for biography: George Painter, Chateaubriand: Volume 1 – The Longed-For Tempests
- Knighthood for services to the theatre: Peter Hall
- Queen's Gold Medal for Poetry: Norman Nicholson
- Whitbread Best Book Award: Beryl Bainbridge, Injury Time

=== United States ===
- American Academy of Arts and Letters Gold Medal for the Novel, Saul Bellow
- Nebula Award: Frederik Pohl, Gateway
- Newbery Medal for children's literature: Mildred D. Taylor, Roll of Thunder, Hear My Cry
- Phi Beta Kappa Award in Science: Gerard K. O'Neill, The High Frontier: Human Colonies in Space
- Pulitzer Prize:
  - Drama: Michael Cristofer, The Shadow Box
  - Fiction: no award given
  - Poetry: James Merrill, Divine Comedies
  - History: David M. Potter: The Impending Crisis, 1841-1861 (Completed and edited by Don E. Fehrenbacher).
  - Biography: John E. Mack: A Prince of Our Disorder: The Life of T. E. Lawrence
- Hugo Award for Best Novella:
  - Spider Robinson, By Any Other Name
  - James Tiptree Jr., Houston, Houston, Do You Read?

=== Rest of the World ===
- Friedenspreis des Deutschen Buchhandels: Leszek Kołakowski
- Miles Franklin Award: Ruth Park, Swords and Crowns and Rings
- Premio Nadal: José Asenjo Sedano, Conversación sobre la guerra
- Viareggio Prize: Davide Lajolo, Veder l'erba dalla parte delle radici

== Notes ==
- Hahn, Daniel (2015). The Oxford Companion to Children's Literature (2nd ed.). Oxford. University Press. ISBN 9780198715542.
