= Decolonising the Mind =

1986 book by Ngũgĩ wa Thiong'o

Decolonising the Mind: the Politics of Language in African Literature
- Author: Ngũgĩ wa Thiong'o
- Language: English
- Subject: African Literature—History and criticism
- Genre: Non-fiction
- Published: 1986
- Media type: Print (Paperback)
- Pages: 114
- ISBN: 0-435-08016-4

Decolonising the Mind: the Politics of Language in African Literature (James Currey, 1986), by the Kenyan novelist and post-colonial theorist Ngũgĩ wa Thiong'o, is a collection of essays about language and its constructive role in national culture, history, and identity. The book, which advocates linguistic decolonization, is one of Ngũgĩ's best-known and most-cited non-fiction publications, helping to cement him as a preeminent voice theorizing the "language debate" in post-colonial studies.

Ngũgĩ describes the book as "a summary of some of the issues in which I have been passionately involved for the last twenty years of my practice in fiction, theatre, criticism, and in teaching of literature". Decolonising the Mind is split into four essays: "The Language of African Literature", "The Language of African Theatre", "The Language of African Fiction", and "The Quest for Relevance". Several of the book's chapters originated as lectures, and apparently this format gave Ngũgĩ "the chance to pull together in a connected and coherent form the main issues on the language question in literature." The book offers a distinctly anti-imperialist perspective on the "continuing debate ... about the destiny of Africa" and language's role in both combatting and perpetrating imperialism and the conditions of neocolonialism in African nations. The book is also Ngũgĩ's "farewell to English", and it addresses the "language problem" faced by African authors. Ngũgĩ focuses on questions about the African writer's linguistic medium (should one write in one's indigenous language, or a hegemonic language such as French or English?), the writer's intended audience, and the writer's purpose in writing.

Decolonising the Mind is a blend of autobiography, post-colonial theory, pedagogy, African history, and literary criticism. Ngũgĩ dedicated Decolonising the Mind "to all those who write in African languages, and to all those who over the years have maintained the dignity of the literature, culture, philosophy, and other treasures carried by African languages."

== Background ==
=== The language debate in post-colonial studies ===
Language is a central question in post-colonial studies. Many post-colonial scholars and writers detail the colonial practice of imposing the colonizer's languages onto the people they colonized, even forbidding the use of the colonized people's native tongue. They examine this practice as part of the systematic oppression of imperialism in neocolonial societies, and they investigate its ramifications on the psychological, physical, and cultural well-being of colonized people. In the context of post-colonial studies, language is a weapon and a site of intense neocolonial conflict.

Some post-colonial theorists advocate, if not a complete abandonment of the English language, at least a conscious and pronounced preference of indigenous languages as a literary or scholarly medium. Ngũgĩ sits firmly on this side of the debate. Others, however (Salman Rushdie, for example), see the practicality of utilizing hegemonic languages like English and French as too immediate to permit the abandonment of such languages. On this side of the argument, writers and activists see using the colonist languages as a practical alternative which they can employ to improve conditions of colonized peoples. For example, a colonist language can be used both to enhance international communication (e.g. people living in Djibouti, Cameroon, Morocco, Haiti, Cambodia, and France can all speak to one another in French). This side also views the subversive potential of the appropriation of a colonist language by an indigenous people; it is seen as a "counter to a colonial past through de-forming a 'standard' European tongue and re-forming it in new literary forms".”

As Jennifer Margulis, a scholar of post-colonial studies at Emory University, outlines, the issue of languages raises several polemical questions for consideration in the study of literary texts:

Does the author choose to work in a local language or a major European one? If the former — how does the work get translated and by whom? What might the translation have done to the work? What kind of semantic processes of abrogation/deformation and appropriation/reformation occur in the work? When a local language lends terms, in what context do they occur? Finally, what does the use of language imply about an implicit theory of resistance?

Thus, the question of whether or not to write in African languages is a serious one for the African writer, as Oliver Lovesey, a scholar of Ngũgĩ wa Thiong’o, notes. In his book on Ngũgĩ and his work, Lovesey quotes Albert S. Gérard on this topic:

This is the dilemma of the African writer today: either he may use a European language and thus gain recognition (and financial reward) from a worldwide audience, but at the risk of cutting himself off from the very roots of all but the most esoteric creative flowering, the common experience of his own society; or he may use his own mother tongue, stoically shun the appeal of the world market, remain one of the inglorious Miltons of the present age, but help his own people’s advance into the age of mass literacy and pave the way for future achievements and renown.

Ngũgĩ's contribution to the language debate is widely known and studied, and he has theorized on the topic extensively. He passionately advocates the overall development of African languages and their use in African literatures—in 1992 he founded the Gikuyu-language journal Mũtĩri, and continued to edit it until his passing—and he famously renounced writing in English. First, he committed to abandoning English in his fiction writing, and in a note on Decolonising the Mind, he bids a final "farewell" to English in all of his writings.

=== Imprisonment and exile ===
In December 1977, following the production of the controversial play Ngaahika Ndeenda (I Will Marry When I Want), which he co-wrote with Ngugi wa Mirii, and the publication of his highly politicized novel Petals of Blood (1977), Ngũgĩ was imprisoned without trial or charges in Maximum Security Prison by the authoritarian Kenyan regime. The play was performed in his native tongue Gikuyu in an open-air theatre in Limuru, with actors who were peasants and workers in the village. Both Petals of Blood and Ngaahika Ndeenda were openly critical of neocolonial life in Kenya, and they garnered Ngũgĩ a reputation with the Kenyan regime as a political dissident. Ngũgĩ was denied employment at the University of Nairobi upon his release, and he was imprisoned again in 1981 and 1982. He published several works while he was shifted in and out of imprisonment: Caitaani Mũtharaba-inĩ (Devil on the Cross), which he had written on toilet paper in prison, and Writers in Politics in 1981, and Detained, an account of his experiences in prison, in 1982.

Upon his release from prison, Ngũgĩ continued to write and produce activist literature and theatre, and he remained critical of the situation in Kenya. Another play Ngũgĩ had helped write, Maitũ Njugĩna (Mother, Sing for Me), was suppressed by the government. Due to his writing about the injustices of the dictatorial government, Ngũgĩ and his family received threats of violence and death, and were forced to live in exile. Ngũgĩ lived out his exile in the United Kingdom (1982–1989) and in the United States (1989–2002). While he was in exile, the Kenyan regime continued to harass him, and attempted to get him expelled from England. The regime also continued to repress his literature in Kenya: from 1986 to 1996, Matigari could not be sold in Kenya, and the regime removed all of Ngũgĩ's work from all educational institutions. Only after Arap Moi was voted out of office, 22 years later, was it safe for Ngũgĩ and his family to return.

Ngũgĩ experienced acute repression, but he was also intensely creative during this earlier period of his exile. Between 1982 and 1984, he widened the scope of his writing and released three children's books in Gikuyu. He published Barrel of a Pen: Resistance to Oppression in Neo-Colonial Kenya, a collection of essays about Kenya's hostile political atmosphere, in 1983. Decolonising the Mind and Matigari were both published in 1986.

In their book on Ngũgĩ and his works, David Cook and Michael Okenimkpe write that Ngũgĩ's works from 1979 onward reveal his renewed determination and mental resilience, and demonstrate that his prison ordeal "strengthened his will to continue the battle for social justice". The works of social and literary criticism Ngũgĩ published since his exile in 1982—Barrel of a Pen (1983), Decolonising the Mind (1986), and Moving the Centre: The Struggle of Cultural Freedom (1993)—are often studied together because they share an interest common themes like imperialism, culture, African languages, African literature, African theatre, education, and religion, and they each articulate his commitment to revolutionary socialist ideology. "Individually these volumes add new dimensions to his writing," Cook and Okenimkpe write, "and together they document a transition in his campaign towards rousing his countrymen to act in practical ways against exploitation and inequality."

== Themes, ideas, and structures ==
=== Language and culture ===
Central to Decolonising the Mind is Ngũgĩ's "theory of language", in which "language exists as culture" and "language exists as communication":

Language as communication and as culture are then products of each other. Communication creates culture: culture is a means of communication. Language carries culture, and culture carries, particularly through orature and literature, the entire body of values by which we come to perceive ourselves and our place in the world. How people perceive themselves and affects how they look at their culture, at their places politics and at the social production of wealth, at their entire relationship to nature and to other beings. Language is thus inseparable from ourselves as a community of human beings with a specific form and character, a specific history, a specific relationship to the world

— Decolonising the Mind (16)

Communication between human beings propels the evolution of a culture, he argues, but language also carries the histories, values, and aesthetics of a culture along with it. As he puts it, "Language as culture is the collective memory bank of a people's experience in history. Culture is almost indistinguishable from the language that makes possible its genesis, growth, banking, articulation, and indeed its transmission from one generation to the next" (15).

Furthermore, in Decolonising the Mind, Ngũgĩ sees language, rather than history or culture, as the enabling condition of human consciousness: "The choice of language and the use of language is central to a people's definition of themselves in relation to the entire universe. Hence language has always been at the heart of the two contending social forces in the Africa of the twentieth century" (4).

=== Imperialism ===
Imperialism is total: it has economic, political, military, cultural and psychological consequences for the people of the world today. It could even lead to holocaust.

— Ngũgĩ wa Thiongo, Decolonising the Mind (2)

Imperialism can be said to over-arch nearly everything Ngũgĩ wrote in his exile writings, particularly Decolonising the Mind. He gives imperialism many definitions in his writings which typically implicate capitalism, as well, including: "the rule of consolidated finance capital" (Decolonising the Mind, 2); "the conquest and subjugation of the entire labour force of other countries by concentrated capital"; and so on. Cook paraphrases Ngũgĩ's understanding of imperialism as he articulates in his work: "Imperialism disrupts the entire fabric of the lives of its victims: in particular their culture, making them ashamed of their names, history, systems of belief, languages, lore, art dance, song, sculpture, even the colour of their skin. It thwarts all its victims' forms and means of survival, and furthermore it employs racism."

=== Imperialism and the "cultural bomb" ===
These discussions intersect as Ngũgĩ grapples with language as both an insidious tool for imperialism as well as a weapon of resistance for colonized peoples. In his introduction, Ngũgĩ asserts, "The study of African realities has for too long been seen in terms of tribes" (1). This is problematic for Ngũgĩ, because this perspective ignores imperialism's historical and contemporary role in the problems in Africa. And so, Ngũgĩ proposes a different approach: "I shall look at the African realities as they are affected by the great struggle between the two mutually opposed forces in Africa today: an imperialist tradition on one hand, and a resistance tradition on the other" (2).

Ngũgĩ considers English in Africa a "cultural bomb" that continues a process of wiping out pre-colonial histories and identities: "The effect of the cultural bomb is to annihilate a people's belief in their names, in their languages, in their environments, in their heritage of struggle, in their unity, in their capacities and ultimately in themselves" (3). He argues that it leaves colonized nations "wastelands of non-achievement", and leaves colonized peoples with the desire to "distance themselves from that wasteland" (3). He determines that "colonial alienation" is enacted by the "deliberate disassociation of the language of conceptualisation, of thinking, of formal education, of mental development, from the language of daily interaction in the home and in the community" (28).

(Colonial Alienation) is like separating the mind from the body so that they are occupying two unrelated linguistic spheres in the same person. On a larger scale it is like producing a society of bodiless heads and headless bodies.

— Decolonising the Mind (28)

In Decolonising the Mind, Ngũgĩ considers "colonial alienation", ultimately an alienation from one's self, identity, and heritage, vis-à-vis linguistic oppression to be imperialism's greatest threat to the nations of Africa.

However, due in large part to his faith in the working classes and "peasantry", Ngũgĩ remains hopeful. He insists that while indigenous African languages have been attacked by imperialism, they have survived largely because they are kept alive by the workers and peasantry, and he maintains that change will only happen when the proletariat is empowered by their own language and culture.

This is what this book on the politics of language in African literature has really been about: national, democratic and human liberation. The call for rediscovery and the resumption of our language is a call for a regenerative reconnection with the millions of revolutionary tongues in Africa and the world over demanding liberation. It is a call for the rediscovery of the real language of humankind: the language of struggle. It is the universal language underlying all speech and words of our history. Struggle. Struggle makes history. Struggle makes us. In struggle is our history, our language and our being. That struggle beings wherever we are; in whatever we do: then we become part of those millions whom Martin Carter once saw sleeping not to dream but dreaming to change the world.

— Ngũgĩ wa Thiong'o, Decolonising the Mind (108)

=== African authors ===
For Ngũgĩ, because he theorizes language as the foundation and carrier of culture, the role of the writer in a neocolonial nation is inherently political. To write fiction in English is to "foster a neocolonial mentality". On the other hand, writing in African languages is a blow to imperialism's systematic oppression. He advocates for African writers to reconnect with their "revolutionary traditions" of anti-imperialism in Africa (28).

I believe that my writing in Gĩkũyũ language, a Kenyan language, an African language, is part and parcel of the anti-imperialist struggles of Kenyan and African peoples... I want (Kenyans) to transcend colonial alienation... We African writers are bound by our calling to do for our languages what Spencer, Milton and Shakespeare did for English; what Pushkin and Tolstoy did for Russian; indeed what all writers in world history have done for their languages by meeting the challenge of creating a literature in them, which process later opens the languages for philosophy, science, technology and all other areas of human creative endeavors.

— Decolonising the Mind (28)

Ngũgĩ also engages with this issue on a distinctly personal level; when he chose to abandon English, he chose to enact out his own theory in practice. As one biographer points out: "Writing in Gikuyu, then, is Ngugi’s way not only of harkening back to Gikuyu traditions, but also of acknowledging and communicating their present."

=== Fanonean and Marxist influence ===
Ngũgĩ is regarded as one of the most significant interpreters of Frantz Fanon, an influential figure in the field of post-colonial studies. Fanon gave careful attention to the violent ramifications of colonialism on the psyches of the colonized, and that the colonized individual was "stunted" by a "deeply implanted sense of degradation and inferiority". Ngũgĩ builds upon Fanon's post-colonial psychoanalysis by proposing art as a means of healing the trauma of colonialism. In Decolonising the Mind, Ngũgĩ discusses, true to Fanon's form, the negative ramifications on the national consciousness as a result of racism, legalized bigotry, and dispossession.

Lovesey notes that while Ngũgĩ's continuing "advocacy of African languages and their use in aiding the process of decolonization has roots in Fanon’s thinking", his interests have ultimately moved beyond Fanon. Ngũgĩ remains "sincerely committed" to the works of Karl Marx and Friedrich Engels, and many liberation movements in Africa have had Marxist roots. As Ngũgĩ once said in an interview: "The political literature of Karl Marx and Friedrich Engels was important and soon overshadowed Fanon. Or rather, Marx and Engels began to reveal the serious weaknesses and limitations of Fanon, especially his own petit bourgeois idealism that led him into mechanical overemphasis on psychology and violence, and his inability to see the significance of the rising and growing African proletariat." Throughout Decolonising the Mind, Ngũgĩ stores great faith in the African "peasantry". He credits them with keeping native African languages alive, and maintains throughout the book that it will be the empowerment of the lower classes alone that will be able to "bring about the renaissance in African cultures" and ultimately uplift African nations from their neocolonial conditions of oppression (23).

In Decolonising the Mind, while he runs with Fanon's idea that a rejection of the colonizers’ linguistic and cultural forms is a precondition for achieving "true" freedom, Lovesey points out that “Ngũgĩ would always add that material circumstances must also change", in keeping with the Marxist tradition of paying careful attention to material history.

=== Autobiographical elements ===
The autobiographical impulse of Decolonising the Mind allows for Ngũgĩ to elegantly intertwine personal and national politics. The anecdotal perspective in Decolonising the Mind lends a certain accessibility to readers on political or theoretical issues that is missing from much of the typical and more disengaged academic discussions of linguistic imperialism and post-colonialism. For example, in "The Language of African Literature", he details the trajectory of the 1884 Berlin Conference's evolution into the 1962 Makerere University College Conference on the Writers of English Expression as a way of illustrating how imperialism was able to indoctrinate even those who were conscious of and active in African literature. He had come to accept the Makerere conference as genuinely African, but he recounts how years later he was struck by his and others' blithe omission of many famous African language writers. He determines that in the 1962 Makerere conference, after "all the years of selective education and rigorous tutelage", he and his contemporaries had been led to accept the "fatalistic logic of the unassailable position of English in our literature" (20). "The logic was embedded deep in imperialism," he says. "And it was imperialism and its effects that we did not examine at Makerere. It is the final triumph of a system of domination when the dominated start singing its virtues" (20).

Furthermore, as Gikandi discusses, Ngũgĩ places his own childhood and youth in a trajectory "that moves from linguistic harmony with his African community to a disjunctive relationship under the grip of the colonial language" in order to support his theory of language, part of which maintains that the native tongue promotes a view of the world that is shared by all members of the linguistic community. In the book, the anecdote operates as a bridge between the reader and the content, and it's part of what made it so popular. As one critic puts it, "Ngũgĩ is a voice emanating from the heart of Africa and, more than a voice, a person suffering the price of exile for exercising freedoms of people in the West and elsewhere take for granted."

== Reception and criticism ==
In a short essay titled "Ngũgĩ wa Thiong'o: In Praise of a Friend", Gayatri Spivak, a fellow pioneer in post-colonial studies, remembers that Ngũgĩ was a "hero" at the time of the appearance of Decolonising the Mind, which instantly became the "controversial classic it remains to this day": "His political commitment and courage, his imprisonment and exile, had given him an aura." Decolonising the Mind was perfectly suited to its moment in Africa and relevant to neocolonial struggles in other nations, and it was quickly adopted to the canon of post-colonial studies in language.

While Decolonising the Mind is in large part a reiteration of much of Ngũgĩ's previous work on the topic, several critics commented that the book finally concentrates his work on language and imperialism, as much of it had previously existed fragmentarily in the form of lectures, interviews, and scattered articles.

As far as a more critical reception is concerned, many critics have argued, most prominently Simon Gikandi, that Ngũgĩ's theory of language as purported in Decolonising the Mind fetishizes language as an ahistorical repository of an innate, romantic and cultural harmony. Gikandi asserts that despite Ngũgĩ's attempts to construct a theory of language that both defines communities and structures experiences, he is left with a forced harmonization: "no language can exist independent of the social ambition of its speakers or the ideological presuppositions behind the institution in which it is taught". According to Gikandi, Ngũgĩ proposes a theory of language that runs up against "all historical evidence" so that he may "reconcile three conflicting perspectives on language: the materialist, the romantic, and the phenomenological." Gikandi does concede, however, that the "real" value of Ngũgĩ's discourse on language "lies in its reconceptualization of national identity and of the institutions of literary and cultural production as vehicles of this identity."

== Influence ==
=== On his own authorship and the language debate ===
Gayatri Spivak, a pioneer of the subaltern studies school, notes the "timeliness" that Ngũgĩ's book manages to maintain in the debates among post-colonial scholars, both 1) about the emerging discussion on language and cultural globalization, as well as 2) the continuing "language question" for authors who write in "subaltern" languages.

Speaking to Ngũgĩ's relevance to the first debate, Spivak notes that while globalization requires a few hegemonic languages in order to maintain international communication, in order to nurture "the impossible dream of a welfare-world globalization (by which she means 'using capital as socialism would'), this requirement must be supplemented by a deep immersion in that world's richness of language." In other words, English has its uses, but nurturing and proliferating indigenous languages will only help to improve the more egalitarian projects of globalization. Spivak insists that Ngũgĩ's Decolonising the Mind paved the way for this perspective on globalization: "Ngũgĩ was not simply arguing for his mother tongue, as his subsequent career has shown. He was also arguing for inhabiting non-hegemonic languages with the depth of imaginative use, while retaining English... as 'the first language of international communication'."

A language for the world? A world of languages! The two concepts are not mutually exclusive provided there is independence, equality, democracy, and peace among nations.

— Moving the Centre (40),

In approaching the second debate, Spivak reiterates Ngũgĩ's relevance to "language question" that has been facing post-colonial writers for decades: "Decolonising the Mind has had a long history in a somewhat specific debate among African and Indian writers. Should one write in one's native language and achieve a small yet culturally prepared audience, or should one write in English and claim an international readership—become world literature instantly, as it were?" She adds, however, that "for Ngũgĩ there was the additional desire to produce for a subaltern audience in the native language." Ngũgĩ, she notes, is caught in a "double bind"—bound by his desires to reach a global audience and to write to a "subaltern" language.

Briefly in the 1980s, Ngũgĩ made conference presentations in Gikuyu and published a significant critical essay in his mother tongue in the prestigious Yale Journal of Criticism. Ngũgĩ did not keep his promise to never again write in English, however. He returned, without explanation, "to his familiar role as a critic of imperial European languages writing in English." Gikandi notes that by the time Ngũgĩ accepted a fellowship in the mid-1990s at New York University, "it was clear that Ngũgĩ's effort to use Gikuyu as the language of both his fiction and critical discourse had been defeated by the reality of exile and American professional life." Gikandi notes that the "more complicated" problem with Ngũgĩ's unexplained return to English for students of his work is contextualizing and rectifying the decision with his politics of language.

==== Decolonising the Mind as pedagogy ====
Decolonising the Mind provides an empathetic pedagogical framework, as some critiques have noted. One critic of Ngũgĩ's work, who is also an English as a second language teacher, notes that exposure to texts such as Ngũgĩ's cultivates empathy for the experiences and cultural contexts of people learning English as a second language, and those most affected by the "globalization of English as an industry". Furthermore, Ngũgĩ offers a "useful resource" for the growing use of narrative and autobiographical methods in TESOL research, and can be used to work to correct the "glaring absence" of non-Western authors, subjects, and publications.

... Ngũgĩ wa Thiong'o's work helps us to recognize, lest we forget, the extensive impact our programs exert on the world beyond our geographical, cultural, and class borders.

— Sonia MacPherson, "Ngũgĩ wa Thiong'o: An African Vision of Linguistic and Cultural Pluralism"

== See also ==
- Decolonization of knowledge
- Language ideology
- Kenyan literature
- World literature
- Post-colonial literature
