= To Control the Stars =

Book by Robert Hoskins

- Author: Robert Hoskins
- Original title: The Problem Makers
- Cover artist: Dean Ellis
- Language: English
- Series: Stars
- Genre: Science fiction novel
- Publisher: Ballantine Books
- Publication date: 1977
- Publication place: United States
- Media type: Print (Paperback and electronic)
- Pages: 188
- ISBN: 0-345-25253-5
- Preceded by: Master of the Stars
- Followed by: To Escape the Stars

To Control the Stars is a 1977 science fiction novel by US editor and writer Robert Hoskins, first written as a story The Problem Makers, and published in Galaxy Magazine, August, 1963.

It is the second of three in the Stars sequence, where, in a setting of galactic rediscovery, planets and organizations struggle to achieve their views of the future. The Society for Homonidic Studies seeks to observe developing planets, while a rival group inside seeks to exploit planets.

== Plot ==
On planet Alnia, warriors burn a native village, then inexplicably let the inhabitants run free. Seemingly unrelatedly, school comes to an end for Shan Eliot, and as with all students on planet Academy, he is automatically assigned a career. But events immediately take a peculiar turn as he is assigned to a secret organization students have not heard of. Oddly, immediate he is taken into an accelerated program, or so it seems.

Once Shan is transported by a gate to Alnia, he is captured by renegades from the Society for Homonidic Studies, and sentenced to death. He narrowly escapes to another world by activating a gate the natives do not recognize. The new world is inhabited by a very advanced civilization that does not want part in the rediscovery of the galaxy by gates.

When Shan is returned, instead of being able to report the activities of the renegades to his uncle, who is a ranking official, he is chased through gates, until arrested by natives and put in a workgang. Finally, with the help of a school friend, Shan reaches his uncle. He and others return to Alnia, intending to rescue a friend, but are captured, instead. With the help of natives who are at odds with the renegades, they escape, then defeat their enemies. Coming again to the planet of the advanced civilization, the inhabitants have fled the galaxy.
