= Adagala =

Adagala is a surname. Notable people with the surname include:

- Beatrice Adagala, Kenyan politician
- Kavetsa Adagala (1947–2014), Kenyan educator and activist
