= Petals of Blood =

1977 novel by Ngũgĩ wa Thiong'o

- First edition
- Author: Ngũgĩ wa Thiong'o
- Language: English, Gikuyu
- Publisher: Heinemann – African Writers Series
- Publication date: 1977
- Publication place: Kenya
- Media type: Print Paperback
- Preceded by: The Trial of Dedan Kimathi (Play)
- Followed by: Ngaahika Ndeenda

Petals of Blood is a 1977 novel by Kenyan writer Ngũgĩ wa Thiong'o. Set in Kenya just after independence, the story follows four characters – Munira, Abdulla, Wanja, and Karega – whose lives are intertwined due to the Mau Mau rebellion. In order to escape city life, each retreats to the small, pastoral village of Ilmorog. As the novel progresses, the characters deal with the repercussions of the Mau Mau rebellion as well as with a new, rapidly westernizing Kenya.

The novel largely deals with the scepticism of change after Kenya's independence from colonial rule, questioning to what extent free Kenya merely emulates, and subsequently perpetuates, the oppression found during its time as a colony. Other themes include the challenges of capitalism, politics, and the effects of westernization. Education, schools, and the Mau Mau rebellion are also used to unite the characters, who share a common history with one another.

== Background ==
Petals of Blood was Ngũgĩ's first novel to have been written while he was not in full-time education, instead being written over a five-year period. Initially begun during his time teaching at Northwestern University in 1970, Ngũgĩ continued to work on the novel after his return to Kenya, finally finishing the novel in Yalta, where he was a guest of the Soviet Writers' Union. Ngũgĩ was inspired to write the novel as a way of synthesizing the notion of a postcolonial nation, and a willingness to portray the agents of social change present in Kenya's change from its colonial past. Petals of Blood was the last of Ngũgĩ's novels to be written first in English.

On 30 December 1977, shortly after the release of his play I Will Marry When I Want, Ngũgĩ was taken into custody by law enforcement officials and held without charges for questioning. According to Patrick Williams, Ngũgĩ was often criticized by detractors for "dragging politics into art".

Despite the political tone to his novels, including Petals of Blood, Ngũgĩ had avoided government interference until deciding to write in his native language Gikuyu. After the release of Petals of Blood, Ngũgĩ wrote and began work on a Gikuyu language play called 'Ngaahika Ndeenda' (I Will Marry When I Want). He was then arrested and detained on 30 December 1977, for crimes relating to his "literary-political" background. After this period, all of his novels would be written first in Gikuyu and later translated into English, a move understood to be a conscious decision to focus more strongly on the peasant workers of Kenya as inspiration for his novels.

== Plot summary ==
Modern day map of Kenya

The book begins by describing the four main characters – Munira, Karega, Wanja, and Abdulla – just after the revelation that three prominent Kenyans, two businessmen and one educator, have been killed in a fire. The next chapter moves back in the novel's timeline, focusing on Munira's move to Ilmorog, to begin work as a teacher. He is initially met with suspicion and poor classroom attendance, as the villagers think he will give up on the village soon, in much the same way previous teachers have done. However, Munira stays and, with the friendship of Abdulla, another immigrant to Ilmorog who owns a small shop and bar, carves out life as a teacher.

Soon Wanja arrives, the granddaughter of the town's oldest and most revered lady. She is an attractive, experienced barmaid whom Munira begins to fall in love with, despite the fact he is already married. She too is escaping the city and begins to work for Abdullah, quickly reshaping his shop, and expanding its bar. Karega arrives in Ilmorog to seek Munira to question him about their old school Syriana. After a brief relationship with Munira, Wanja once again grows disillusioned and leaves Ilmorog. The year of her departure is not good for the village as the weather is harsh and no rain comes, making for a poor harvest. In an attempt to enact changes, the villagers are inspired by Karega to journey to Nairobi in order to talk to their Member of Parliament.

The journey is very arduous and Joseph, a boy whom Abdullah had taken in as his brother and who had worked in his shop, becomes ill. When they arrive in Nairobi, the villagers seek help from every quarter. They are turned away by a reverend who thinks they are merely beggars, despite their pleas of help for the sick child. Trying at another house, some of the villagers are rounded up and forced into the building where they are questioned by Kimeria, a ruthless businessman who reveals that he and their MP are in league with one another. He blackmails Wanja and subsequently rapes her. Upon arriving in Nairobi and speaking to their MP, the villagers realise that nothing will change, as he is little more than a demagogue. However, they do meet a lawyer who wishes to help them and others in the same predicament and through a court case highlights Ilmorog's plight. This draws attention from national press and donations and charities pour into Ilmorog.

Finally, the rains come, and the villagers celebrate with ancient rituals and dances. During this time, Karega starts a correspondence with the lawyer that he met in Nairobi, wishing to educate himself further. To celebrate the rain's coming, Nyakinyua brews a drink from the Thang'eta plant, which all of the villagers drink. Karega tells the story of the love between him and Mukami, the older sister of Munira. Mukami's father looked down on Karega because of his brother's involvement with the Mau Mau. Forced to separate, Mariamu and Karega do not see each other again, and Mukami later commits suicide by jumping into a quarry. This is the first time Munira hears the story. Later, an unknown plane crashes in the village; the only victim is Abdulla's donkey. Wanja notices that there are several large groups of people who come to survey the wreckage, and suggests to Abdulla that they begin to sell the Thang'eta drink in Abdulla's bar. The drink attracts notoriety, and many people come to the bar in order to sample it. Out of fury for Karega's connection to his family and jealousy of his relationship with Wanja, Munira schemes to have Karega fired from his teaching post with the school. Karega then leaves Ilmorog.

Development arrives in Ilmorog as the government begin to build the Trans-Africa road through the village, which brings an increase in trade. Karega returns to Ilmorog, telling of his slow spiral into alcoholism before finally securing work in a factory. After getting fired from the factory, he returns to Ilmorog. The change in Ilmorog is rapid, and the villages change into the town of New Ilmorog. The farmers are told that they should fence off their land and mortgage parts of it to ensure that they own a finite area. They are offered loans which are linked to their harvest turnout to pay for this expense. Nyakinyua dies and the banks move to take her land. To prevent this Wanja sells her business and buys Nyakinyua's land. She opens up a successful brothel in the town and is herself one of the prostitutes. Munira goes to see her attempt to rekindle their romance but is met with only demand for money. He pays, and the couple have sex. Karega goes to see Wanja who both still have strong feelings for each other, but after disagreeing about how to live he leaves. Wanja plans to separate herself finally from the men who have exploited her during her life, wanting to bring them to her brothel with all of her prostitutes sent away so that she could present the downtrodden but noble Abdulla as her chosen partner. Meanwhile, Munira is watching the brothel and sees Karega arrive, and then leave. In a religious fervour, he pours petrol on the brothel, sets it alight, and retreats to a hill to watch it burn. Wanja escapes but is hospitalized due to smoke inhalation; the other men Wanja had invited died in the fire. Munira is sentenced with arson; later, Karega learns that the corrupt local MP was gunned down in his car whilst waiting for his chauffeur in Nairobi.

=== Explanation of the novel's title ===
The title Petals of Blood is derived from a line of Derek Walcott's poem 'The Swamp'. The poem suggests that there is a deadly power within nature that must be respected despite attempts to suggest by humans that they live harmoniously with it.

Fearful, original sinuosities! Each mangrove sapling

Serpent like, its roots obscene
As a six-fingered hand,

Conceals within its clutch the mossbacked toad,
Toadstools, the potent ginger-lily,
Petals of blood,

The speckled vulva of the tiger-orchid;
Outlandish phalloi

Haunting the travellers of its one road.

— Derek Walcott, The Swamp

Originally the novel was called "Ballad of a Barmaid", and it is unclear why Ngũgĩ changed the title before release. The phrase "petals of blood" appears several times throughout the novel, with varying associations and meanings. Initially, "petals of blood" is first used by a pupil in Munira's class to describe a flower. Munira quickly chastises the boy, saying that "there is no colour called blood". Later, the phrase is used to describe flames, as well relating to virginity during one of Munira's sexual fantasies.

== Characters ==
- Munira – schoolteacher who goes to Ilmorog in order to teach in its dilapidated school. He falls in love with Wanja and is the arsonist the police seek.
- Wanja – Granddaughter of Nyakinyua. As an experienced barmaid who flees her past in the city. She falls in love with Karega, although she is still coveted by Munira. She also sleeps with Abdulla because of her reverence for his actions in the Mau Mau rebellion. An industrious barmaid, she helps Abdulla's shop to become successful, and also sells Theng'eta. She later becomes a prostitute and runs her own brothel before being injured in Munira's arson attack.
- Abdulla – A shopkeeper who lost his leg in the Mau Mau rebellion. His main assets in life are his shop and his donkey, as well as a boy Joseph, who he had taken in and cares for as a brother. He is the only major character to have worked with the Mau Mau during the rebellion.
- Karega – Young man who works as a teaching assistant at Munira's school before becoming disillusioned and heading for the city. After the trip to Nairobi, he becomes enamoured with socialism, and starts to educate himself on its principles and on the law. However, he later becomes disillusioned with the effects of education, and how apt it is in the struggle for liberation. As a youth, he dated Munira's sister who subsequently committed suicide; this was unknown to Munira until Karega reveals it to him and to others after having drunk Theng'eta.
- Nyakinyua – The village's most revered woman, and the grandmother of Wanja. She performs all of the traditional ceremonies in the village. At first she is highly sceptical of Munira's arrival, believing that he will flee the village like his predecessors. After her death, Wanja sells her business to save Nyakinyua's land from the banks and also uses the proceeds to start a brothel.
- Kimeria – Ruthless businessman who is part of the new Kenya elite. Has an interest in Ilmorog for business purposes, and had a previous relationship with Wanja. As the villagers travel to Nairobi to meet with their politician, Kimeria holds Wanja hostage and rapes her.
- Chui – a schoolboy at the prestigious, previously European Siriana school, he leads a student revolt. However, when he returns to lead the school, he enacts an oppression far greater than was present during colonial rule. He later become one of the new Kenya elite, and is involved in business dealings with both Kimeria and Nderi wa Riera.
- Nderi wa Riera – the local politician for Ilmorog's district, he lives and works in Nairobi. He is a demagogue who does not listen to the appeals of the villagers when they meet him. Rather, he is interested in Ilmorog merely for business, and is in league with Kimeria. With Kimeria and Chui, he is a director of the widely successful Theng'eta Breweries.

== Major themes ==
=== Corruption ===
One primary underlining theme in Petals of Blood is the failure of the ruling Kenyan elite to adequately meet the needs of the people. After the new postcolonial governments come to power, the leaders maintain their connections with the outgoing colonizers, thus marginalizing the everyman. In the novel, the elite are portrayed as both government officials and businessmen who violate the villagers of Ilmorog in both passive and aggressive ways. The corrupt system acts like a chain—in the novel, when the government's lawyers declare that they have solved the murder cases, the people of Ilmorog realize that as long as the corrupt system stays in place and continues churning out corrupt individuals, there will be no change.

Ngũgĩ makes the dichotomy between the villagers (the honest working class) and the elite (corruption) most visible in the speech that Nyakinyua gives before the villagers, which motivates them to make the trip to Nairobi. She says, "I think we should go. It is our turn to make things happen. There was a time when things happened the way we in Ilmorog wanted them to happen. We had power over the movement of our limbs. We made up our own words and sang them and we danced to them. But there came a time when this power was taken from us.... We must surround the city and demand back our share" (pp. 115–116). However, along their way, they are unjustly detained by Kimeria the businessman, who reveals that he is colluding with the MP, and who afterwards rapes Wanja.

=== Capitalism ===
Capitalism is decried in Petals of Blood, with the new Kenyan elite portrayed as controlled by the 'faceless system of capitalism'. The everyman loses out to capitalist endeavours, and is essentially exploited by the new Kenyan elite. Farmers are forced to mark out their lands and mortgage them with loans linked to the success of their harvest; as the quality of the harvests waver, many are forced to sell their land, unable to match their loan repayments. Thang'eta is another symbol of capitalism. Taken from a drink that Nyakinyua brews in a traditional ceremony, it is soon marketed, and becomes extremely popular. Wanja, who introduces the drink to Abdulla's bar, is then exploited by big business who forces her to stop her Thang'eta operation. Neither she nor Munira, who creates the slogan, receive the fruits of their labour. Originally a drink used to help people relax and escape their current problems, it becomes 'a drink of strife'.

Cities are portrayed as places where capitalism flourishes and are contrasted strongly with the village of Ilmorog. In its pursuit for the modern, Kenya adopts capitalism at the expense of tradition as the city begins 'to encroach upon and finally swallow the traditional and the rural.' As time progresses, Ilmorog changes vastly, as do its inhabitants. With its modernization, influenced greatly by capitalism and the chance to increase trade, Munira reflects on these changes and how they link with capitalism, saying that 'it was New Kenya. It was New Ilmorog. Nothing was free.'

=== Land ===
Agriculture is an important theme in Petals of Blood, most notably in the town of Ilmorog, an isolated, pastoral community. After modernization, the farmers lands are fenced off and ultimately seized when they cannot repay their loans. Although none of the main characters lose their land in this way (Wanja, however, sells her family's plot), it is significant in that Kenya recreates what happened during colonial rule: the loss of land and subsequent desire to reclaim it was "the central claim" for those who rebelled against the settlers.

The notion of land and fertilisation is often linked to Wanja, who is seen as the embodiment of these concepts. As she is portrayed as "the symbol of the nation", the loss of her land to the new Kenyan elite is an important parallel with Ngũgĩ's depiction of Kenya. Land is also linked to Kenya itself, with Ngũgĩ suggesting that anyone who sells their land is a traitor.

=== Education ===
Education is often depicted cynically in Petals of Blood. Munira is a teacher, but lacks strong abilities to guide his pupils, instead preferring to stand back and not to assert any of his own beliefs. He rejects the claims of others that the children should be taught more about being African, instead preferring that they be taught politics, and things which are "fact". Two of the three "betrayers of the people", those who are ultimately murdered, are also educators; they are untrustworthy, and depict the education system as a "problematic institution" in independent Kenya.

Although there is a brief suggestion that education does provide hope, as Joseph succeeds academically at Siriana, it the education system as a whole which is criticized. The notion of education as self-liberating is critiqued, as Joseph's success is still within the Siriana school, previously a bastion of "European" education. In a more political sense, Karega's self-education causes him to doubt his initial belief that education was a tool to gain liberation; originally taken in by the lawyer's socialist rhetoric, Karega's dealings with education ultimately leave him disillusioned.

== Style ==
Petals of Blood relies heavily on flashbacks, using the points of view of the four major characters to piece together previous events. As each character is questioned by the police, the novel takes on certain characteristics of the detective novel, with a police officer trying to ascertain details of their pasts in order to find the murderer of Chui, Kimeria, and Mzigo. The flashbacks also encompass several different timeframes. The present-day action takes place over the course of 10 days; the past events take places over 12 years. Ngũgĩ also discusses Kenya's past, going as far back as 1896, when Kenya was transformed into a colony.

The narrative voice shifts between Munira and the other characters describing the events of their lives, and an omniscient narrator. There is also a suggestion of a communal narrative voice, as Ngũgĩ draws on the mythic past of Kenya to place the novel in a wider context than simply the colonial. This communal voice is at work through the various Gikuyu songs with which Ngũgĩ intersperses the novel; there is a great reliance placed on such songs, which help tell, through the oral tradition of linking of proverbs and fables, the history of Ilmorog and Kenya before colonial intervention.

== Reception ==
Petals of Blood caused a stronger critical reaction than Ngũgĩ's previous novels. The use of the past and historical memory is far more widespread in the novel due largely to the use of flashbacks, and questions relating to the past "from the central concerns" of the novel. The strong political motif that runs throughout the novel has also been discussed, focusing on the relation of political ideas to the Petals of Blood's wider framework: Ngũgĩ was lauded for his "successful marriage" of political content and artistic form. During the 1980s the novel was adapted by Mary Benson into a two-hour-long radio play starring Joe Marcell by BBC Radio 3.

Ngũgĩ was criticised, however, for his stylistic form in Petals of Blood. It was suggested that the social realism of the novel did not accurately represent or complement the socialist ideals put forth. John Updike suggested that Ngũgĩ's desire to permeate the plot with political ideas detracts from his writing. The novel's plot was also deemed to be "rambling" as well as being too short, or too much curtailed.

== Bibliography ==
- Adagala, Kavetsa (1985), Wanja of Petals of Blood: The Woman Question and Imperialism in Kenya
- Gérard, Albert S. (1986), European-language Writing in Sub-Saharan Africa, Amsterdam: John Benjamins, ISBN 978-963-05-3834-3.
- Gikandi, Simon (2000), Ngũgĩ wa Thiong'o, Cambridge: Cambridge University Press, ISBN 978-0-521-48006-2.
- Gugelberger, Georg M. (1986), Marxism and African Literature, Trenton, NJ: Africa World Press, ISBN 978-0-86543-031-0.
- Killam, G. D. (2004), Petals of Blood, Westport, CT: Greenwood, ISBN 978-0-313-31901-3.
- Losambe, Lokangaka (2004), An Introduction to the African Prose Narrative, New Jersey: Africa World Press, ISBN 978-1-59221-137-1.
- Mwangi, Evan (Winter 2004), "The Gendered Politics of Untranslated Language and Aporia in Ngugi wa Thiong'o's Petals of Blood", Research in African Literatures, 35 (4): 70, doi:10.1353/ral.2004.0099.
- Ngugi, wa Thiong'o (1986), Petals of Blood, Oxford: Heinemann, ISBN 0-435-90834-0.
- Ngugi, wa Thiong'o (1995), Cantalupo, Charles (ed.), The World of Ngugi wa Thiong'o, New Jersey: Africa World Press, ISBN 978-0-86543-459-2.
- Parekh, Pushpa Naidu; Jagne, Siga Fatima (1998), Postcolonial African Writers: A Bio-Biographical Critical Sourcebook, Westport, CT: Greenwood, ISBN 978-0-313-29056-5.
- Stilz, Gerhard (2002), Missions of Interdependence: A Literary Directory, Kenilworth, NJ: Rodopi, ISBN 978-90-420-1429-9.
- Walcott, Derek (1993), Wayne Brown (ed.), Selected Poetry, Oxford: Heinemann, ISBN 978-0-435-91197-3.
- Wamalma, D. Salituma (First Quarter 1986), "The Engaged Artist: The Social Vision of Ngugi wa Thiong'o", Africa Today, 33 (1): 14.
- Williams, Patrick (1999), Ngũgĩ wa Thiong'o, Manchester: Manchester University Press, ISBN 978-0-7190-4731-2.
