= To Escape the Stars =

1978 sci-fi novel by Robert Hoskins

- First edition
- Author: Robert Hoskins
- Cover artist: Dean Ellis
- Language: English
- Series: Stars
- Genre: Science fiction novel
- Publisher: Ballantine Books
- Publication date: 1978
- Publication place: United States
- Media type: Print (Paperback and electronic)
- Pages: 186 pp
- ISBN: 0-345-25856-8
- Preceded by: To Control the Stars

To Escape the Stars is a 1978 science fiction novel by US editor and writer Robert Hoskins.

== Synopsis ==
The book is the third of three in the Stars sequence, which is loosely based upon an earlier novel, The Problem Makers. It is set 100,000 years into the future, 10,000 years after the previous novel, where gate travel between worlds is common, even for transporting raw materials.

The novel has two distinct parts, the first describing the bad behavior of the protagonist, the second describing the renewed search for the advanced aliens from Alnia. The book's hero and protagonist is James Oregas, a selfish coloniser of planets.

== Reception ==
Mary Weinkauf, reviewing from Science Fiction and Fantasy Book Review, described it as picaresque and criticised its theme, interest, and originality.

B. C. Hacker writing in Library Journal described it as a good story.
