= The Dred Scott Case: Its Significance in American Law and Politics =

1978 nonfiction book by Don E. Fehrenbacher

- Author: Don E. Fehrenbacher
- Subject: Dred Scott v. Sandford
- Genre: history
- Publisher: Oxford University Press
- Publication date: 1978
- Publication place: US
- Pages: 759
- Awards: Pulitzer Prize for History
- ISBN: 0195145887

The Dred Scott Case: Its Significance in American Law and Politics is a 1978 nonfiction book by the American historian Don E. Fehrenbacher, published by Oxford University Press. The book explores the infamous U.S. Supreme Court case Dred Scott v. Sandford of 1857, which ruled that the U.S. Congress could not regulate slavery in the territories, that the Constitution did not regard Black people as citizens, and that Black people "had no rights which the white man was bound to respect."

In 1979, The Dred Scott Case was awarded the Pulitzer Prize for History.
