= Robert B. Gottlieb =

American academic, activist and writer

- Born: 1944 (age 81–82)
- Occupations: Academic, writer, activist
- Known for: Urban & Environmental Policy Institute, food justice

Academic background
- Education: University of Chicago

Academic work
- Institutions: Occidental College, University of California, Los Angeles

Robert Bernard Gottlieb (born 1944) is an American academic, writer, and activist. From 1997 to 2015, he served as the Henry R. Luce Professor of Urban and Environmental Policy at Occidental College, where he co-founded and directed the Urban & Environmental Policy Institute (UEPI). He has authored numerous works on environmental justice, urban policy, and social justice.

== Biography ==
=== Community engagement ===
Gottlieb co-founded the Pollution Prevention Education and Research Center at UCLA in 1991 and later established UEPI at Occidental College when he took his new position in 1997. He contributed to initiatives such as farm-to-school programs, food policy councils, and community-based environmental policy development.

== Works ==
Gottlieb's writings focus on social change, power, resistance, and the conditions that shape public policy and civic life.

=== Thinking Big (1977) ===
Thinking Big: The Story of the Los Angeles Times, Its Publishers and Their Influence on Southern California (with Irene Wolt) examined the role of the Los Angeles Times in shaping public opinion and regional politics. Carey McWilliams, called Thinking Big “a first-rate study.” Ben Bagdikian, the former National Editor of the Washington Post, characterized it as “a comprehensive and clear-eyed account of one of the most important newspapers in America [that represented] “a service to both the cause of better newspapers and to the citizenry at large.”

=== Empires in the Sun (1985) and America’s Saints (1984) ===
In collaboration with Peter Wiley, Gottlieb co-authored Empires in the Sun: The Rise of the New American West, a profile of six Western cities—Salt Lake City, Phoenix, Las Vegas, Denver, Los Angeles, and San Francisco—and the forces shaping their growth. According to Joan Nice of High Country News, the book told of “how the West works, how its decisions are made, who pulls the strings and pockets the profits.” Their follow-up, America’s Saints: The Rise of Mormon Power, analyzed the economic and political influence of The Church of Jesus Christ of Latter-day Saints.

=== A Life of its Own (1988) ===
Gottlieb addressed water policy in A Life of Its Own: The Politics and Power of Water, and co-authored Thirst for Growth: Water Agencies as Hidden Government in California with Margaret FitzSimmons. The latter studied six Southern California water agencies, including the Metropolitan Water District of Southern California. Barry Commoner said of Gottlieb's role in water politics that he had “the incisive knowledge of an insider and the courage of an outsider.”

=== War on Waste (1989) and Reducing Toxics (1995) ===
With Louis Blumberg, Gottlieb co-authored War on Waste: Can America Win Its Battle with Garbage?, developed from a UCLA graduate project evaluating a proposed waste incinerator. He also edited Reducing Toxics: A New Approach to Policy and Industrial Decision-making, a collaborative work by four UCLA faculty and students associated with the Pollution Prevention Education and Research Center. War on Waste evolved out of a student project that included a team of six UCLA graduate students whom Gottlieb supervised. The purpose of their study was to evaluate the health, environmental, and community impacts of a proposed waste-to-energy incinerator to be located in a low-income community. Reducing Toxics, which Gottlieb edited and to which he contributed several chapters, was a collaborative effort of four UCLA Professors (Gottlieb, John Froines, David Allen, and Julie Roque) and several of their students.

=== Forcing the Spring (1993) and Environmentalism Unbound (2001) ===
In Forcing the Spring: The Transformation of the American Environmental Movement, Gottlieb offered a history of environmentalism with emphasis on social justice. The Journal of the American Planning Association, “a more complex, vibrant, socially critical and justice-oriented history and perspective on American environmentalism than most of us are used to.”Environmentalism Unbound: Exploring New Pathways for Change followed with case studies including toxics, dry cleaning, and food systems, based on work at the UEPI.

=== The Next Los Angeles (2005) and Reinventing Los Angeles (2007) ===
Since his arrival in Los Angeles in 1970, Gottlieb has focused on the Southern California region as the objective and the source of his research, policy engagement, and activism. In 1998, through UEPI, he co-founded the Progressive Los Angeles Network (PLAN) and organized a conference on the history and contemporary role of progressive movements in Los Angeles. PLAN then set up a series of working groups to develop a comprehensive policy agenda in advance of the 2001 Los Angeles mayoral election. The PLAN agenda was subsequently incorporated into a book, Gottlieb co-authored The Next Los Angeles: The Struggle for a Livable City with colleagues (Mark Vallianatos, Regina Freer, and Peter Dreier) from Occidental College and UEPI. It stemmed from the Progressive Los Angeles Network's policy agenda. His subsequent work, Reinventing Los Angeles: Nature and Community in the Global City, explored water, transportation, and planning through the lens of activism and urban research.The Commonwealth Club in turn awarded Reinventing Los Angeles at its California Book Awards gathering for its “Californiana” prize.

=== Food Justice (2010) ===
In 1996, Gottlieb helped organize one of the first farm-to-school programs in the US and established the Los Angeles, California, and National Farm to School Networks. While still at UCLA, he also supervised another groundbreaking student action research project that helped inspire the development of a Los Angeles Food Policy Council. With Anupama Joshi, Gottlieb co-wrote Food Justice, addressing food systems, access, and equity. He helped establish the Center for Food Justice and the National Farm to School Network, and supported the founding of the Los Angeles Food Policy Council through student-led projects.

=== Global Cities (2017) ===
Gottlieb has collaborated with environmental justice groups organizing around the community, health, and environmental impacts from global trade, freight traffic, and the movement of goods. Through these collaborations, international linkages were established with researchers and policy research groups, including with Civic Exchange, a leading research-policy think tank based in Hong Kong. Gottlieb arranged talks in LA for Civic Exchange's Research Director, Simon Ng, and Gottlieb, in turn, was invited by Civic Exchange and groups at Mainland China Universities to give presentations about his work and the action research work of UEPI and its community partners. Ng and Gottlieb then collaborated to produce Global Cities: Urban Environments in Los Angeles, Hong Kong, and China (MIT Press, 2017).

=== Care Politics (2022) ===
Shortly before he retired from teaching at Occidental in 2015, Gottlieb gave the Graham L. Sterling Memorial lecture at Occidental and was profiled in the documentary “Bob Gottlieb: Beneath the Paving Stones: A River.” His forthcoming book, Care-Centered Politics: From the Home to the Planet, was released by MIT Press in 2022.

== Awards and honors ==
Year	Organization	Award	Work	Result
2002	Society for the Study of Social Problems	C. Wright Mills Award	Environmentalism Unbound	Nominated
2003	American Political Science Association	Outstanding Book: Transformational and Ecological Politics	Environmentalism Unbound	Nominated
2007	Center for Community Action and Environmental Justice	Dr. Zweig Health Advocate Award	–	Won
2008	Commonwealth Club of California	California Book Award	Reinventing Los Angeles	Won
