= Kavetsa Adagala =

Kenyan educator

- Born: 1947; Kenya
- Died: August 3, 2014 (age 67); Kenya
- Occupation(s): Educator, activist

Ebbie Kavetsa Adagala (1947 – August 3, 2014) was a Kenyan educator and activist. She taught literature at the University of Nairobi, and was a member of the Constitution of Kenya Review Commission.

== Biography ==
Adagala was from the Maragoli ethnic group, the daughter of Quaker educator Solomon Adagala and Doris Adagala. One of her brothers, Seth Adagala, was the first African director of the Kenya National Theatre.

Adagala was a lecturer in the literature department at the University of Nairobi, and co-edited a textbook, Kenyan Oral Narratives (1985). She ran on the Kanu ticket for a seat in Kenya's parliament in 1997, but did not win. She was one of the seven female members of the Constitution of Kenya Review Commission, and the Bomas Constitutional Conference.

Adagala died at home, from complications of diabetes, in August 2014, at the age of 67.

== Publications ==
- Language and literature in primary schools: Lulogooli ne tsing'ano tsya valogooli (1979)
- "The Impact of Development on Women in Kenya" (1982, with Priscilla Kariuki and Patricia Bifani)
- "Kenya Before the Conference" (1985)
- Women in the Liberation of Mother Africa (1985)
- "Wanja of Petals of Blood: The woman question and imperialism in Kenya" (1985)
- Self-employed Women in the Peri-urban Setting: Petty Traders in Nairobi (1985, with Patricia Bifani)
- Kenyan Oral Narratives: A Selection (1985, 1994; textbook, edited with Wanjiku Mukabi Kabira)
- "Gender Issues in the Co-operative Movement" (1987)
