= Don E. Fehrenbacher =

American historian

Don Edward Fehrenbacher
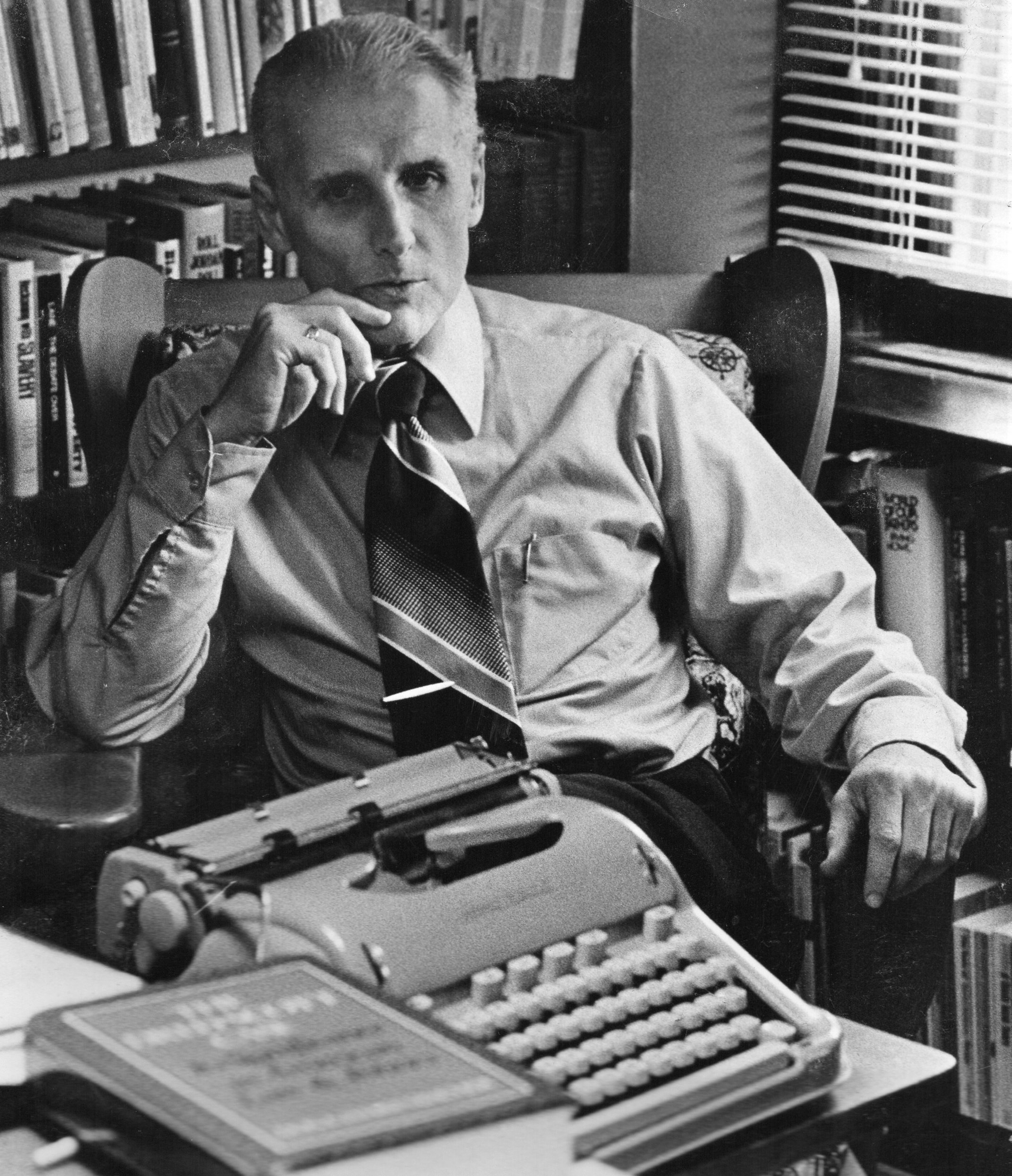
- Born: August 21, 1920; Sterling, Illinois, U.S.
- Died: December 13, 1997 (aged 77); Palo Alto, California, U.S.
- Education: Cornell College (BA); University of Oxford (MA); University of Chicago (MA, PhD)
- Occupation: History professor
- Known for: 19th century U.S. history

Don Edward Fehrenbacher (August 21, 1920 – December 13, 1997) was an American historian. He wrote on politics, slavery, and Abraham Lincoln. He won the 1979 Pulitzer Prize for History for The Dred Scott Case: Its Significance in American Law and Politics, his book about the Dred Scott Decision. In 1977 David M. Potter's The Impending Crisis, 1848-1861, which he edited and completed, won the Pulitzer Prize. In 1997 he won the Lincoln Prize.

== Biography ==
Born on August 21, 1920, in Sterling, Illinois. From 1953 to 1984 Fehrenbacher taught American history at Stanford University. Fehrenbacher died in Stanford, California. He was survived by his wife Virginia, three children, numerous grandchildren, a sister, Shirley, and two brothers, Robert and Marvin. His posthumous book, The Slaveholding Republic: An Account of the United States government's Relations to Slavery (completed and edited by Ward M. McAfee), won the Avery O. Craven Award from the Organization of American Historians in 2002.

== Publications ==
1957 - Chicago Giant: A Biography of "Long John" Wentworth
1962 - Prelude To Greatness: Lincoln In The 1850s
1964 - A Basic History of California
1964 - Abraham Lincoln: A Documentary Portrait Through His Speeches and Writings
1968 - California: An Illustrated History
1968 - Changing Image of Lincoln in American Historiography
1969 - Era of Expansion 1800-1848
1970 - The Leadership of Abraham Lincoln
1970 - Manifest Destiny and the Coming of the Civil War, 1840-1861
1970 - Leadership of Abraham Lincoln (Problems in American History)
1976 - The Impending Crisis (completed and edited by)
1978 - Tradition, Conflict and Modernization (Studies in Social Discontinuity)
1978 - The Dred Scott Case: Its Significance in American Law and Politics
1979 - The Minor Affair: An Adventure in Forgery and Detection
1980 - The South and Three Sectional Crises
1981 - Slavery, Law, and Politics: The Dred Scott Case in Historical Perspective
1987 - Lincoln in Text and Context: Collected Essays
1989 - Abraham Lincoln: Speeches and Writings 1832-1858
1989 - Lincoln: Speeches and Writings: Volume 2: 1859-1865
1989 - Constitutions and Constitutionalism in the Slaveholding South
1995 - Sectional Crisis and Southern Constitutionalism
1996 - Recollected Words of Abraham Lincoln (compiled and edited with Virginia)
2001 - The Slaveholding Republic: An Account of the United States government's Relations to Slavery (completed and edited by Ward M. McAfee)
