= Underground to Canada =

Historical novel

First edition (publ. Clarke Irwin)

Underground to Canada is an historical novel for young readers by Barbara Smucker. It was first published in Canada in 1977 and published in the United States the following year as Runaway to Freedom: A Story of the Underground Railway. Based partially on a true story, the novel is set in the United States and Canada in the years leading up to the American Civil War and depicts the hard lives of slaves in the American South and the people who helped them escape to Canada via the Underground Railroad. The novel is studied in many Canadian schools.

== Plot ==
Julilly was born a slave on the Hensen Cotton Plantation in Virginia. Her initial happy life was changed when slave traders from the Deep South arrived. Julilly was taken from her mother's arms and moved to The Riley Plantation in Mississippi, where she meets Liza, an injured girl who needs help making it to the land of the free-Canada. After a week or so on the plantation, Alexander Ross, an abolitionist from Canada, arrives disguised as a bird watcher to free the two girls along with Lester and Adam. They set off at the dead of night and travel around the country with help from the conductors of the Underground Railroad. However, Adam and Lester are captured and taken back to the Riley Plantation, leaving the girls to fend for themselves. They finally make it to Canada and are free. Lester also meets them there, while Adam has died. Julilly finally reunites with her mother, who adopts Liza. Although they still face discrimination in Canada, they are prepared to build a life together.

== Publication history ==
Underground to Canada was first published in 1977. It was then republished with a new cover in 1999 and again for a 25th Anniversary Edition in 2013 by Puffin Classics.

== Controversy ==
Due to the use of the N-word in the novel, many parents found the book upsetting and feared it would contribute to an emergence of racism in the classroom. Complaints were filed against the use of the book in a Manitoba classroom in 1998 and in a Nova Scotia classroom in 2002. Those who disagreed with the novel being taught in their children's classrooms disliked the image that it gave Black people and argued that it spoke too lightly of slavery. Lawrence Hill, the introductory speaker in the 25th Anniversary Edition of the book, agreed that it was a lighter speculation of a racist history, but that it also was written in a way for young readers to understand the barbaric situation.

== Honors and awards ==
Barbara Smucker won several awards over her career as a children's novelist, including Canada Council Children's Literature Prize, the Brotherhood Award from the National Conference of Christians and Jews, the Vicky Metcalf Award, the Violet Downey Book Award from IODE Canada, and received additional honors from multiple secondary education institutions.

Underground to Canada has received numerous international awards and honorable mentions since its creation. Despite the challenges the book has faced, it has been awarded Children's Book Center (one of the 50 best books of all time in Canada), IBBY Honour Book, Brotherhood Award (National Conference of Christians and Jews), All-Japan Library Committee and Catholic Teachers Association of West Germany, 1001 Children's Books You Must Read Before You Grow Up, Vicky Metcalf Award, Shalom Readers Club Book List and many others.

== See also ==
- Slavery in Canada
- Slavery in the United States
