= The Impending Crisis, 1848–1861 =

1976 book by David M. Potter

- First edition
- Author: David M. Potter (completed by Don E. Fehrenbacher)
- Genre: history
- Publisher: Harper & Row
- Publication date: 1976
- Publication place: US
- Pages: 672
- Awards: Pulitzer Prize for History
- ISBN: 9780061319297

The Impending Crisis, 1848–1861 is a 1976 nonfiction book by American historian David M. Potter, who had died in 1971. The book was completed by fellow Stanford University professor Don E. Fehrenbacher and published in 1977 by Harper & Row. It was awarded the Pulitzer Prize for History.
