= David M. Potter =

American historian (1910–1971)

- Born: December 6, 1910; Augusta, Georgia, US
- Died: February 18, 1971 (aged 60)
- Awards: 1977 Pulitzer Prize for History (posthumously)

Academic background
- Education: Emory University; Yale University

Academic work
- Discipline: history
- Institutions: University of Mississippi; Rice Institute; Yale University; Stanford University
- Main interests: American Civil War
- Notable works: The Impending Crisis, 1848–1861

David Morris Potter (December 6, 1910 – February 18, 1971) was an American historian specializing in the study of the lead up to the American Civil War, especially the political factors involved. His best known book is The Impending Crisis, 1848–1861, which was completed and edited by Don E. Fehrenbacher and published posthumously in 1976; it won the 1977 Pulitzer Prize for History.

== Life and career ==
Potter was born in Augusta, Georgia. He graduated from the Academy of Richmond County, and, in 1932, from Emory University. Potter entered graduate school at Yale University the same year, working with Ulrich Bonnell Phillips, who died in 1934 before he started his dissertation. He taught at the University of Mississippi for 1936–1938, then at the Rice Institute, now Rice University, in 1938–1940. He completed his dissertation in 1940 at Yale.

In 1942 Yale published his revised dissertation as Lincoln and His Party in the Secession Crisis and hired him as an assistant professor. At Yale from 1942 to 1961 and at Stanford University as Coe Professor of American History, 1961 to 1971, he directed numerous dissertations and served on various editorial and professional boards. He edited The Yale Review from 1949 to 1951.

As a visitor he held the Walgreen Lectureship at the University of Chicago, and the Commonwealth Fund Lectureship at the University of London. He was the Harold Vyvyan Harmsworth Professor of American History at Oxford University in 1947.

Potter won the 1977 Pulitzer Prize for History posthumously for The Impending Crisis, 1848–1861 (1976, completed and edited by Don E. Fehrenbacher), an in-depth narrative and analysis of the causes of the American Civil War. His main achievement was to put the history of the South in a national perspective. He rejected the conflict model of Charles A. Beard and emphasized the national depth of consensus regarding American values.

Potter considered himself a conservative and was a prominent exponent of consensus history.

== Death ==
Potter died of cancer at age 60. The New York Times obituary quoted an encomium by historian Martin Duberman:

David Potter may be the greatest living historian in the United States. To read him is to become aware of a truth that only the greatest historians have been able to show us: That the chief lesson to be derived from a study of the past is that it holds no simple lesson, and that the historian's main responsibility is to prevent anyone from claiming that it does.

== Memberships and honors ==
Potter was an elected member of the American Philosophical Society and the American Academy of Arts and Sciences. He was President of the American Historical Association at the time of his death, as well as President of the Organization of American Historians.

Potter was awarded honorary degrees from Oxford University and the University of Wyoming.

== Works ==
- His most important book, completed and edited by Don E. Fehrenbacher, was The Impending Crisis, 1848–1861, Harper & Row, 1976. online
- Lincoln and His Party in the Secession Crisis (1942), with a new preface in 1962. New Haven, Connecticut: Yale University Press. Published with a new introduction by Daniel W. Crofts. Baton Rouge, LA: Louisiana State University Press, 1995. online
- "American Women and the American Character" in American Character and Culture in a Changing World: Some Twentieth-Century Perspectives (Greenwood Press, 1979): 209–225.
- Freedom and Its Limitations in American Life, edited by Don E. Fehrenbacher, compiled by George Harmon Knoles, Stanford University Press, 1976.
- History and American Society: Essays of David M. Potter, ed. by Don E. Fehrenbacher, Oxford University Press, 1973.
- Division and the Stresses of Reunion, 1845–1876, Glenview, Ill.: Scott, Foresman, 1973.
- The South and the Concurrent Majority, edited by Don E. Fehrenbacher and Carl N. Degler, Baton Rouge, LA: Louisiana State University Press, 1972.
- The South and the Sectional Conflict, Baton Rouge, LA: Louisiana State University Press, 1968. Nominated for the National Book Award.
- (With Curtis R. Grant) Eight Issues in American History: Views and Counterviews, Glenview, Ill.: Scott, Foresman, 1966.
- "The Historian's Use of Nationalism and Vice Versa," American Historical Review, Vol. 67, No. 4 (July 1962), pp. 924–950 in JSTOR
- The Background of the Civil War, National Council for the Social Studies, 1961.
- (With Manning) Nationalism and Sectionalism in America, 17751877, Holt, 1961.
- (Editor, with William Goetzmann) The New Deal and Employment, Holt, 1960.
- (Editor) E. David Cronon and Howard R. Lamar, The Railroads, Holt, 1960.
- (Editor) Party Politics and Public Action, 1877–1917, Holt, 1960.
- The American Round Table Discussions on People's Capitalism, 1957.
- People of Plenty: Economic Abundance and the American Character, 1954.
- (With Thomas G. Manning) Select Problems in Historical Interpretation, Holt, Volume I, 1949, Volume II, 1950.
- "An Appraisal of Fifteen Years of the Journal of Southern History, 1935–1949," Journal of Southern History, Vol. 16, No. 1 (Feb. 1950), pp. 25–32 in JSTOR
- "The Historical Development of Eastern-Southern Freight Rate Relationships," Law and Contemporary Problems, Vol. 12, No. 3 (Summer, 1947), pp. 416–448 in JSTOR
- "Horace Greeley and Peaceable Secession," Journal of Southern History, Vol. 7, No. 2 (May 1941), pp. 145–159 in JSTOR
- "Why the Republicans Rejected Both Compromise and Secession," in George Harmon Knoles, ed., The Crisis of the Union: 1860–1861, Baton Rouge, LA: Louisiana State University Press, 1965, pp. 90–106, Comment by Kenneth M. Stampp, pp. 107–113; reprinted in Wilentz, Sean, ed., The Best American History Essays on Lincoln, New York: Palgrave Macmillan, 2009, pp. 175–188, without the comment by Stampp. Potter believed Republicans rejected both compromise and secession because they thought Southern Unionism would prevail. They did not believe that rejecting compromise and secession would lead to war. "Today, our hindsight makes it difficult for us to understand this reliance on Southern Unionism...." (Knoles, 101).
