= Kamiriithu Community Education and Cultural Centre =

The Kamiriithu Community Education and Cultural Centre was an arts and education facility built in Kamiriithu, Kenya in 1976. Ngũgĩ wa Thiong'o spearheaded the project's creation, while scholars from the University of Nairobi and locals from the Kamiriithu village community supported the project as well. The centre was especially focused around theatre, through a multitude of self-contained programs geared towards different community groups. The participants came from a variety of different classes, but were predominantly made up of the local peasant class.

The centre produced shows in Kikuyu, as well as drama and musical productions that featured song, dance, and mimes. The centre was most famous for its production of Ngaahika Ndeenda (I Will Marry When I Want) written by Ngũgĩ wa Thiong'o and Ngugi wa Mirii in collaboration with community members of Kamiriithu and directed by Dr. Kimani Gecau. The production premiered on October 2, 1977, and took place in an open-air theatre at Kamiriithu, housing an audience of at least 10,000 people.

The Kenyan government banned the centre from holding any public gatherings due to perceived critiques of the Kenyan justice system. The production of Ngaahika Ndeenda was stopped six weeks after its opening. Ngugi wa Thiong'o was arrested on December 31, 1977, for being a potential political threat to the Kenyan government at the time. During Thiong'o's imprisonment, the Kamiriithu Community Center began a production of Maitu Njugira (Mother Sing for Me) which was co-directed by Dr. Kimani Gecau and Waigwa Wachiira and set to premiere at the Kenyan National Theatre on February 19, 1982. The government withdrew the centre's licence for public performance in November 1977 and banned all theatre activities at the Kamiriithu Community Education and Cultural Centre (and neighbouring areas) on March 11, 1982.

On March 12, 1982, three truckloads of armed police arrived at the Kamiriithu Community Education and Cultural Centre and destroyed the theatre.

== See also ==
Ngaahika Ndeenda
