= Barbara Smucker =

American novelist (1915–2003)

- Born: Barbara Claassen; September 1, 1915; Newton, Kansas, U.S.
- Died: July 29, 2003 (aged 87)
- Education: Bethel College; Kansas State University
- Occupation: Writer
- Spouse: Donovan Smucker (m. 1939; died 2001)
- Writing career
- Genre: Children's literature

Barbara Claassen Smucker (September 1, 1915 – July 29, 2003) was an American writer, primarily of children's fiction, who lived in Canada from 1969 to 1993. She is the author of twelve books, including Underground to Canada (1977) which is still widely studied in Canadian schools and Days of Terror (1979) which won the Canada Council Children's Literature Prize. In 1988, she received the Vicky Metcalf Award for a distinguished body of writing.

Born Barbara Claassen in Newton, Kansas, she studied for a year at Bethel College and then went to Kansas State University where she received a bachelor's degree in journalism in 1936. After graduation, she taught high school for a year and then worked as a journalist for The Evening Kansan-Republican. In 1939 she married Donovan Smucker, a Mennonite pastor and academic specialising in Christian ethics. They moved to Canada in 1969, where Donovan taught at Conrad Grebel College in Ontario while Barbara worked as a librarian, first as the children's librarian at Kitchener Public Library and then as the head librarian of Renison College (1977–1982). Most of her books were published while they were living in Canada. The couple returned to the United States in 1993, settling in Bluffton, Ohio. Donovan died in 2001. Barbara died two years later in the Mennonite Memorial Home at age 87.

== Books ==
- 1955: Henry's Red Sea; Scottdale: Herald Press
- 1957: Cherokee Run; Scottdale: Herald Press
- 1966: Wigwam in the City, illustrated by Gil Miret; New York: Dutton (published as Susan; New York: Scholastic Book Services)
- 1977: Underground to Canada, illustrated by Tom McNeely; Toronto: Clark, Irwin (published in 1978 as Runaway to Freedom: A Story of the Underground Railway, illustrated by Charles Lilly; New York: Harper)
- 1979: Days of Terror; Scottdale: Herald Press
- 1983: Amish Adventure; Scottdale: Herald Press
- 1983: CMBC Junior Boys Rescue Team; Self Published (5 copies made, unknown if they still exist)
- 1985: White Mist; Toronto: Clarke, Irwin
- 1987: Jacob's Little Giant; Markham, Ontario: Viking Kestrel
- 1990: Incredible Jumbo; New York: Viking
- 1996: Selina and the Bear Paw Quilt, illustrated by Janet Wilson; New York: Crown
- 1999: Selina and the Shoo-fly Pie, illustrated by Janet Wilson; New York: Stoddart Kids
- 1999: Garth and the Mermald
