= Military Miniatures =

Book by Simon Goodenough

First edition (publ. Orbis Books)

Military Miniatures is a book by Simon Goodenough published in 1977.

== Contents ==
Military Miniatures is a book about miniatures including their history, information about collecting them, how to assemble miniatures kits, techniques for painting them, how to do conversions of miniatures, building dioramas, as well as moulding and casting miniatures.

== Reception ==
C. Ben Ostrander reviewed Military Miniatures in The Space Gamer No. 18. Ostrander commented that "The book is highly recommended to the novice and old pro alike. If nothing else, the great photos show what can be done with a little time and effort."

== Reviews ==
- Campaigns: An International Magazine of Military Miniatures
- Craft, Model, and Hobby Industry Magazine
