= Kamirithu =

- Location within Kenya
- Coordinates: 1.12°S 36.63°E
- Country: Kenya
- County: Kiambu County

Population
  - Urban: 42,084
- Time zone: UTC+3 (EAT)

Kamirithu is a settlement in Kiambu County, within Kenya's former Central Province. It was one of the colonial villages established during the scramble for the Kenyan "White Highlands" in the early 1900s. Kamirithu is the home of Chief Kamiri and Chief Jairus. Kamirithu is best known from Ngugi wa Thiong'o's Kamirithu Educational and Cultural Center, which was an open-air theater where Ngaahika Ndeenda (I Will Marry When I Want) was first performed.

== Location and boundaries ==
"'Kamirithu"' is a suburb of Limuru located within the greater Kiambu district. The boundaries of Kamirithu are marked by three roads and one highway: The road to Narok to the north, the Limuru–Mutarakwa road to the west, and the Nairobi–Nakuru highway (A104 road) to the east. The Manguo pond, a tourist bird-watching attraction, is located north of Kamirithu. Towards Limuru Kamirithu is the Mutambuki Quarry, a source of building stones. Toward it sunsets the beginning of the Mau escarpment known as Wahinya Quarry.

The village was burned down in 1955 and replaced by an emergency settlement, which was later developed into a permanent settlement.

The name of Kamirithu comes from the Mirithu, which means "a flat place on which rests a pool of water defiant to drought."

Kamirithu is an important place in the book Wrestling with the devil: a prison memoir, as it is the home town of its writer Ngugi wa Thiong'o.

The neighborhood contains many smaller, cohesive settlements, including:

- Gitogothi
- Ngarariga
- Manguo
- Tarambana
- Kamandura
- Mutarakwa
- Kwambira

== Notable people ==
- Ngũgĩ wa Thiong'o
