= Ngũgĩ wa Mirii =

Kenyan playwright (1951–2008)

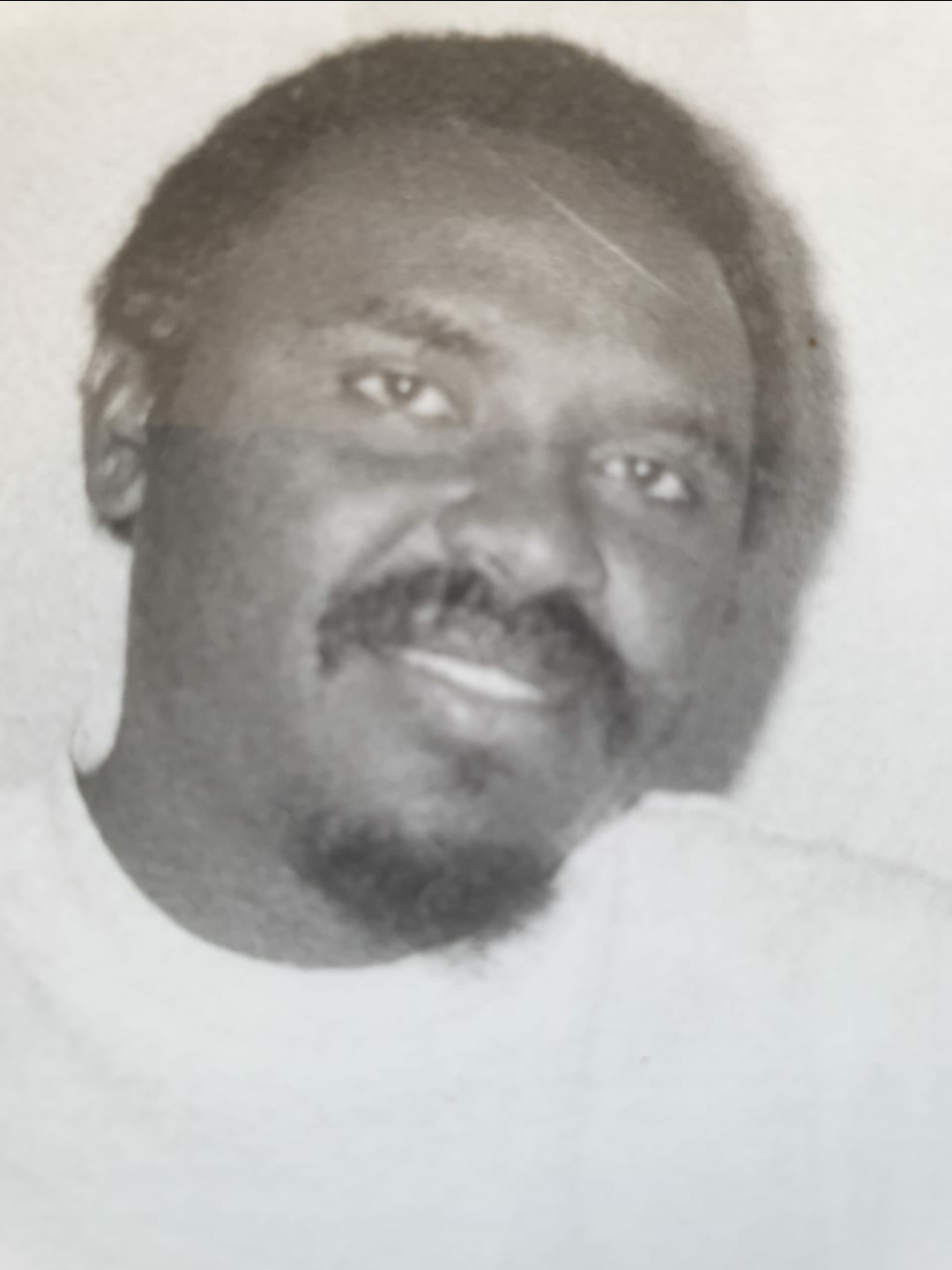
- Born: 1951; Roromo, Limuru, Kenya
- Died: 3 May 2008; Zimbabwe
- Education: Nairobi University
- Occupation: Playwright
- Children: Elizabeth Wanjiku Ngũgĩ, Wangari Ngugi, John Mirii Ngugi, Peter Kiarie Ngugi and Martha Nyambura
- Relatives: Margaret Katungu, Zion Macharia, Zara Macharia, King Ngugi Mirii (grandchildren)
- Writing career
- Language: Gĩkũyũ language
- Notable works: Ngaahika Ndeenda (English: I Will Marry When I Want)

Ngũgĩ wa Mirii (1951 – 2/3 May 2008) was a Kenyan-Zimbabwean playwright, social worker and teacher, most known for his play Ngaahika Ndeenda, which he co-authored with fellow Gikuyu writer Ngũgĩ wa Thiong'o. The play depicts the injustices and excesses of post-colonial Kenya, and was staged by non-intellectuals in an open-air theatre at the Kamirithu Educational and Cultural Center in Limuru.

== Early life ==
Born in Roromo, Limuru, Kenya, Ngũgĩ wa Mirii was the second born in a family of six children born to John Mirii and Elizabeth Wanjiku. He was educated at Ngenia Secondary School and from 1972 to 1974 worked with the Kenya Posts and Telecommunications Corporation. He obtained a diploma in Adult Education at the Institute of Adult Studies, Nairobi University, and then joined the Institute of Development Studies. While working there he became involved with peasants and workers in community development at Kamiriithu, Limuru.

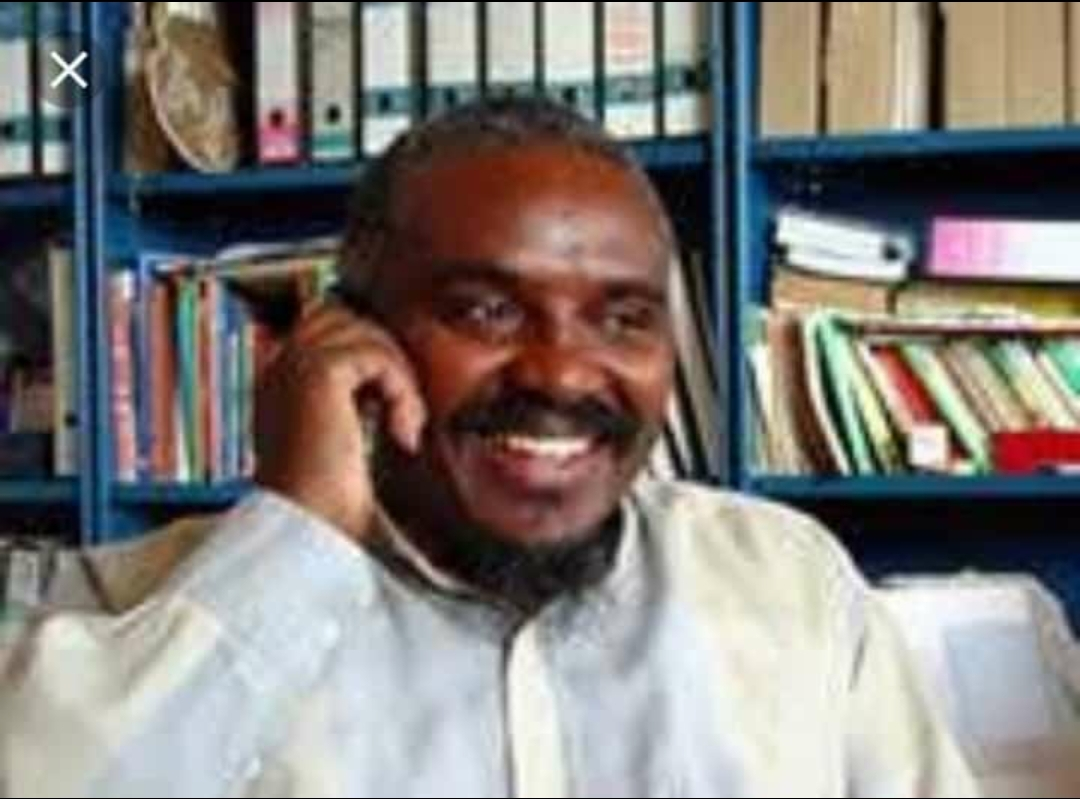

== Playwright ==
In 1977, Ngũgĩ wa Mirii and Ngũgĩ wa Thiong'o co-authored a play titled Ngaahika Ndeenda (I Will Marry When I Want). Both playwrights were arrested six weeks after the play debuted, and detained in prison.

Five years later, their next play Mother Cry for Me, forced both playwrights into exile, with Ngũgĩ wa Mirii settling in Zimbabwe while Ngũgĩ wa Thiong'o fled first to Britain, and then to the United States.

== Exile ==
In 1982, Ngũgĩ wa Mirii fled to Zimbabwe where he lived in exile. Ngũgĩ wa Mirii was joined a year later by his wife, Wairimu wa Ngũgĩ and one-year-old daughter, Elizabeth Wanjiku Ngũgĩ. He then joined Zimbabwean Foundation for Education with Production (ZIMFEP) where he worked for several years.

In Zimbabwe, he wrote extensively about the Pan-African cause. In 1985, he was awarded funding to found the Zimbabwean Association of Community Theatre. He was granted Zimbabwean citizenship shortly after.

Ngũgĩ wa Mirii was known as a supporter of Robert Mugabe and Zanu-PF.

== Death ==
On 3 May 2008, Ngũgĩ wa Mirii died in a car accident in Zimbabwe, after he drove into a stationary lorry nearby the suburb of Eastlea. He was 57 at the time.

== Works ==
- Ngaahika Ndeenda (I Will Marry When I Want), co-written with Ngũgĩ wa Thiong'o (1977)
