= Ngaahika Ndeenda =

Kenyan theatrical play

Ngaahika Ndeenda (I Will Marry When I Want)
- Original language: Kikuyu
- Written by: Ngũgĩ wa Thiong'o; Ngũgĩ wa Mirii
- Subject: Class struggle
- Setting: Kenya

Premiere
- Place: Kamiriithu Community Education and Cultural Centre

Ngaahika Ndeenda (I Will Marry When I Want) is a controversial play that covers post-colonial themes of class struggle, poverty, gender, culture, religion, modernity vs. tradition, and marriage and family.

The play was written by Ngũgĩ wa Thiong'o and Ngũgĩ wa Mirii in the Kikuyu language and first performed in Kenya in 1977 at Kamiriithu Educational and Cultural Center.

Set in post-independence Kenya, the play is a searing look at the legacies of colonialism and the difficulties Kenyans faced at the time. It was performed at Kamiriithu for six continuous weeks before it was shut down by the government.

Both playwrights were arrested and detained in December 1977. They were released in December 1978, and fled into exile shortly after. Ngũgĩ wa Mirii fled to Zimbabwe, while Ngũgĩ wa Thiong'o fled to the UK, and then to the United States.

== Plot ==
The storyline of the play centres on a peasant farmer, Kĩgũũnda and his wife, Wangechi, and their daughter, Gathoni. Kĩgũũnda's most highly prized possession is a 1 1/2-acre piece of land whose title deed he keeps carefully and often fingers gingerly and tenderly. The family are expecting a rare visit from the wealthy farmer and businessman, Ahab Kĩoi wa Kanoru and his wife, Jezebel. Kĩgũũnda works on one of Ahab's farms. The aim of this visit is a puzzle as it is unprecedented and they belong to different social classes.

But on recalling that the Kĩois’ son, John Mũhũũni, has shown some amorous tendencies towards their daughter, they surmise that the purpose of the visit could be either to warn that the two don't see each other again, or to ask for Gathoni's hand in marriage. When it occurs to the two that the purpose of the visit could be to ask for Gathoni's hand in marriage, they reminisce about the days of their youthfulness and courtship, teasing each other in the process. But Kĩgũũnda recalls also that both Ahab and his business partner, Ikuua wa Nditika are local directors of an international company that manufactures insecticides and Ikuua has written to ask Kĩgũũnda for his one and a half acres land in order to build a factory. This, he thinks, could also be the reason for this visit.

While waiting, Kĩgũũnda tries to mend the chair on which his guests will sit. Wangeci, meanwhile, prepares a meal. But Gathoni rather plaits her hair. In the process, a drunk comes into their courtyard teasing and inviting Kĩgũũnda for a drink, and singing, “I Shall Marry When I Want.” Wangeci drives him away and just then a group of singers come into the courtyard singing. They belong to the sect of the destitute and are trying to raise funds to build a church. Kĩgũũnda turns them away with the explanation that they can hardly feed their bellies let alone have money for fund-raising.

Eventually, the Kĩois and the Ndugĩres arrive. Their mission turns out to be to try to convince Kĩgũũnda and Wangeci to stop living in sin, as they put it, by getting married in the church. Having married his wife I the traditional way, Kĩgũũnda is sizzled because his marital relationship is described as sin. He reaches for his sword, and angrily drives them away.

Just then Gathoni enters looking particularly sizzling in her new dress, her pair of new platform shoes, and slinging a new hand bag over her shoulder. Her flaunting of her new apparel causes eyebrows to be raised. When she gives out that her new look is due to the generous purse of John, the son of Kĩoi, her parents raise objections, brand her a whore, and order that she return them to his beau and be content with her lot.

“And I go back to my rags?” she shoots back. Her father counsels, “A man brags about his penis however small. A poor house, but mine!” He warns her not to overstep the boundaries. But she pooh-poohs this warning and accompanies her boyfriend John to Mombasa for a week against her parents’ expressed wishes.

Not long after Kĩgũũnda and Wangeci decide to have a church wedding, but realizing the heavy financial burden entailed they turn to their newly found family-in-Christ, the Kĩois, for financial assistance. In order to give this assistance Kĩoi induces Kĩgũũnda to use the title-deed of his one-and-a-half acres land as security so that he, Kĩoi, would vouch for him at the bank. Things work out well and Kĩgũũnda obtains the loan.

There's a turn-around in their material life and Kĩgũũnda and Wangeci refurbish their home and acquire a few modern items. Just as Kĩgũũnda and Wangeci are reveling over their impending wedding, matters turn sore and sour. Gathoni returns home in tears and with a tattered soul. John has jilted and impregnated her but refused responsibility for the pregnancy.

Kĩgũũnda and Wangeci stomp to the Kĩois and present this problem. The Kĩois defend their son and call Gathoni a whore. An altercation ensues and Kĩgũũnda is shot and wounded. Kĩoi sacks Kĩgũũnda and the bank demands that Kĩgũũnda repay the loan. He reneges in his commitment to the bank, and a series of adverse events culminate in mayhem, loss of his land to Kĩoi, and his wallowing in drunkenness.

== Characters ==
- Kĩgũũnda, Farm Labourer. His plot of land becomes the centre of interest for Kioi and several of his investment partners
- Wangeci, Kĩgũũnda's wife
- Gathoni, their daughter
- Gicaamba, Kĩgũũnda's neighbour, a factory worker
- Njooki, Gicaamba's wife
- Ahab Kioi wa Kanoru, wealthy farmer and businessman. Also the factory owner who uses his connections to defraud the peasant and his wife of their land.
- Jezebel, Kioi's wife
- Samuel Ndugire, Nouveau riche farmer and shopkeeper
- Helen, Ndugire's wife
- Ikuua Wanditika, Kio's business partner

== Major themes ==
=== Class struggle ===
Using Marxist ideology, Ngugi reveals the tensions in post-colonial Kenya in regards to the worker/peasant population and the elite Kenyans. The latter work with Europeans, bringing back uncomfortable associations of the country's colonial past. They are greedy, ignorant, and unconcerned with the masses of people; they embrace Western religion and philosophy and move far from their origins. The working class cannot survive for very much longer and by the end of the text prepares to mount another revolution -this time for economic parity, not independence. Ngugi's characters, especially Gĩcaamba, offer convincing accounts of why this struggle is necessary and pure.

=== Modernity vs. tradition ===
This theme is seen in the relationship between Wangeci, Kĩgũũnda, and their daughter. Gathoni is a modern woman, one who wants to buy things and choose when she wants to marry. Her parents decry this and associate it with an encroachment of Western values. They cannot conceive of her making choices in this respect, and perhaps more minor but equally important, are frustrated with her lack of manners and work ethic. The play is slightly more sympathetic to the parents (and, by extension, tradition) by not giving Gathoni many words or thoughts of her own outside of petulant ones.

=== Gender ===
Gĩcaamba pays lip service to the idea that gender equality must be an important component of their revolution and they must appreciate women's contributions. On the other hand, the play reinforces a traditional gender hierarchy. The female characters are mostly silent, and when they do talk, it is either about frivolous things or it reveals their ignorance about the importance of this fight. Gathoni, a character who might augur a new, modern and equal woman, is given short shrift. The family and the home, where men and women's roles are largely ossified, is the focus.

=== Culture ===
Traditional Kenyan culture is viewed in contrast to Western culture; the latter is seen as alien and found wanting. It would be reductive to call this a play about "culture clash," but the term is nevertheless useful. Kĩgũũnda and his ilk decry the influx of Western ideas, particularly regarding religion, marriage, the value of work and land, etc. Kĩoi and the other Kenyan elite prefer to distance themselves from their own culture and embrace those of the West, mostly because it allows them to get ahead. The contrast between the two marriage ceremonies offers the most instructive look at how Ngugi depicts Kenyan culture as more authentic and meaningful and Western culture as soulless at its worst and alien at its best.

=== Political struggle ===
The class struggle takes place in the context of an earlier political struggle in which the Mau Mau rebels fought a revolution for Kenyan independence. Ngugi calls explicit attention to this earlier struggle, valorizing the achievements of the Mau Mau, celebrating their ethos and philosophy, and suggesting that his characters adopt the same principled unity to wage this battle against Kenyan elites and their foreign friends who have taken over their economy and opened the doors to Western values, systems, and philosophies.

=== Marriage and family ===
Marriage and family are given primacy in the play, as the title suggests. Ngugi has a more traditional view of marriage than other late 20th century writers. The focus is on the home and on a solid marriage rooted in companionship and the ability to care for one another. He excoriates the Western conception of marriage, which Njooki characterizes as property marrying property. His depictions of the two marriages (Gĩcaamba and Njooki's, and the Christian one proposed by Kĩoi for Wangeci and Kĩgũũnda) elevate the former and criticize the latter. He also seems ambivalent about having a too-emotional, laissez-faire attitude about the institution, as seen in Gathoni's viewpoint. The play begins and ends in the home, with traditional Kenyan views on family and marriage taken prominence.

=== Religion ===
The theme of religion is couched in other themes, such as class struggle. This is because religion is a tool of the oppressors, and is a flash point for debates about traditional vs. outsider culture and values. The play is not explicitly anti-religion, but Gĩcaamba in particular lays out how the Kenyan churches often argued against independence and capitulated to Western influences. He decries all of the Western churches opening throughout their villages. He also spends a great deal of time explaining how religion is an opiate, is the "alcohol of the soul" because it encourages people to think not about their earthly struggles but about their future in heaven; this precludes criticism and uprising, and allows people like Kĩoi to flourish and fatten while the poor do their best to ignore their woes or conclude that they are God-given.

== Staging and censorship ==
Ngaahika Ndeenda was performed at the Kamiriithu Community Education and Cultural Centre - an open-air theater at Kamiriithu, in Limuru, Kenya. Ngũgĩ's project sought to create an indigenous Kenyan theater, which would liberate the theatrical process from what he held to be "the general bourgeois education system", by encouraging spontaneity and audience participation in the performances. If traditional theatrical form was based on rehearsal "more or less in secrecy", in order to present an awing, perfected, daunting final form to an audience, the playwrights aimed to present a form of theater which would abstain from "mystifying knowledge and hence reality".

== Legacy ==
By concealing the struggles of the actors to achieve their sought-after form as embodiments of their characters, traditional theater, according to Ngũgĩ, actually causes people in the audience to "feel their inadequacies, their weaknesses and their incapacities in the face of reality; and their inability to do anything about the conditions governing their lives."

The play points an accusatory finger at church institutions that are complicit in facilitating the wedding arrangements and act only as a means for the oppressed workers to drown their sorrows, juxtaposing them with the local bars in which the characters spend their time. The story echoes the Biblical King Ahab, who is pressured by his wife Jezebel to kill a vineyard owner, Naboth, and seize his vineyard.

The staging of the play in a local theatre sought to "demystify" the theatrical process, and to avoid the "process of alienation [which] produces a gallery of active stars and an undifferentiated mass of grateful admirers" which, according to Ngũgĩ, encourages passivity in the viewer. Although Ngaahika Ndeenda was a commercial success, it was shut down by the authoritarian Kenyan regime six weeks after its opening.

Both playwrights were subsequently imprisoned for over a year.

== Return ==
The play was performed again starting in 2022, in both Gikuyu and English.
