= Outline of the Gambia =

Country in West Africa

The Flag of the Gambia

The location of the Gambia

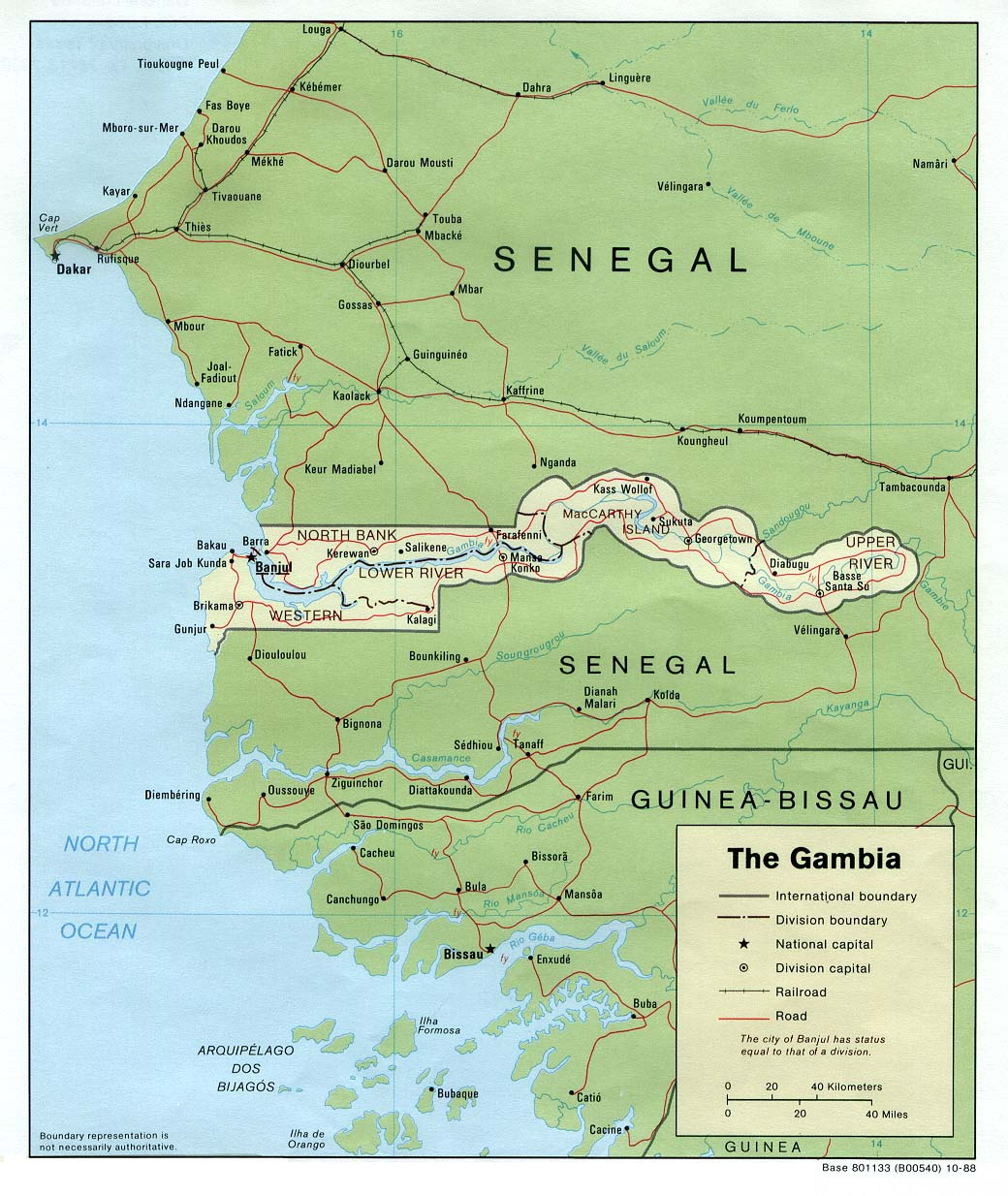
An enlargeable map of the Republic of the Gambia

The following outline is provided as an overview of and topical guide to the Gambia:

The Gambia – country in West Africa, officially named the Republic of the Gambia. The Gambia shares historical roots with many other West African nations in the slave trade, which was the key factor in the placing and keeping of a colony on the Gambia River, first by the Portuguese and later by the British. On 18 February 1965, the Gambia gained independence from the United Kingdom and joined the Commonwealth of Nations. Since gaining independence, the Gambia has enjoyed relative political stability, with the exception of a brief period of military rule in 1994. Thanks to the fertile land of the country, the economy is dominated by farming, fishing, and tourism. About a third of the population lives below the international poverty line of US$1.25 a day.

== General reference ==
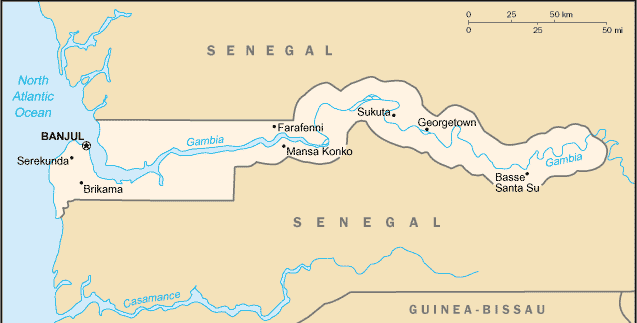
An enlargeable basic map of the Gambia

- Pronunciation: /ˈɡæmbiə/
- Common English country name: The Gambia
- Official English country name: (The) Republic of the Gambia
- Common endonym(s):
- Official endonym(s):
- Adjectival(s): Gambian (disambiguation)
- ISO country codes: GM, GMB, 270
- ISO region codes: See ISO 3166-2:GM
- Internet country code top-level domain: .gm

== Geography of the Gambia ==
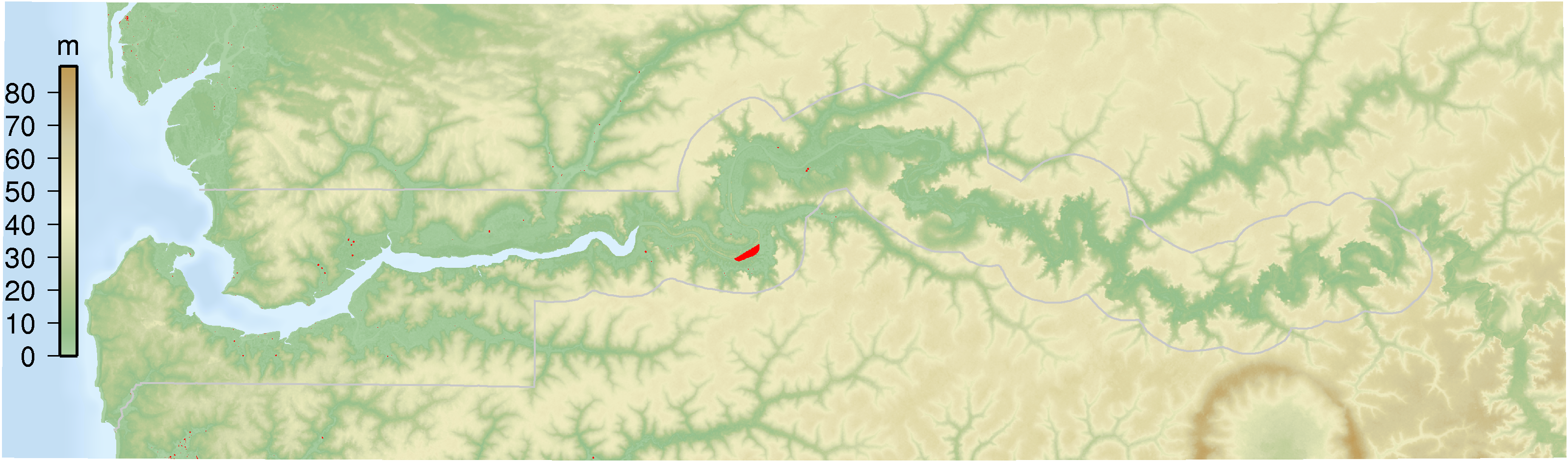
An enlargeable topographic map of the Gambia

Geography of the Gambia

- The Gambia is: a country
- Population of the Gambia: 1,709,000 people - 146th most populous country
- Area of the Gambia: 10,380 km^{2} (4,010 sq mi) - 164th largest country
- Atlas of the Gambia

=== Location ===
- The Gambia is situated within the following regions:
  - Northern Hemisphere and Western Hemisphere
  - Africa
    - West Africa
- Time zone: Coordinated Universal Time UTC+00
- Extreme points of the Gambia
  - High: unnamed location 53 m (174 ft)
  - Low: North Atlantic Ocean 0 m
- Land boundaries: Senegal 740 km
- Coastline: North Atlantic Ocean 80 km

=== Environment of the Gambia ===
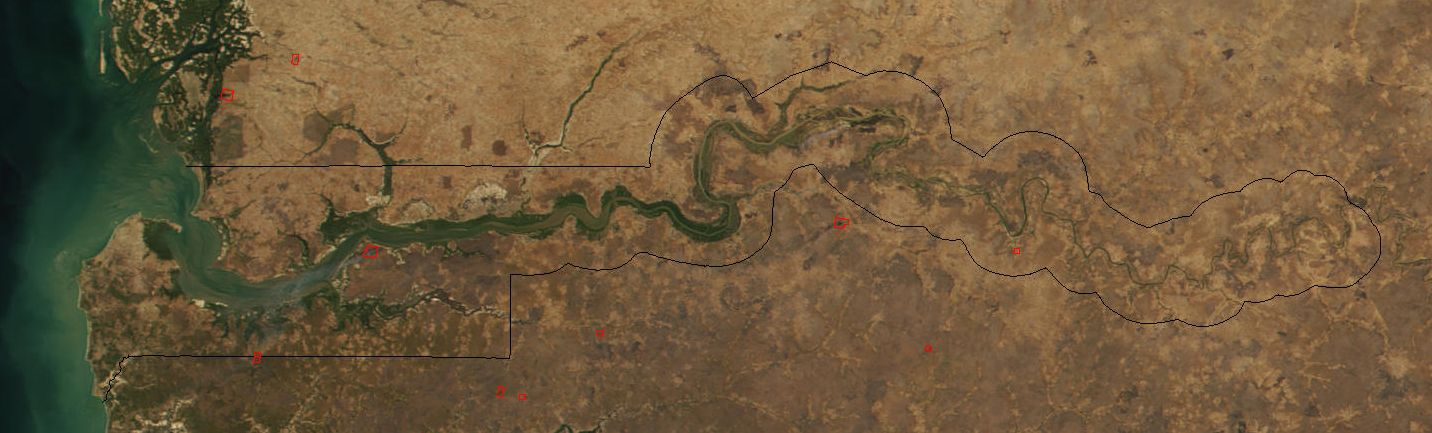
An enlargeable satellite image of the Gambia

- Protected areas of the Gambia
  - National parks of the Gambia
- Wildlife of the Gambia
  - Fauna of the Gambia
    - Birds of the Gambia
    - Mammals of the Gambia

==== Natural geographic features of the Gambia ====
- Glaciers in the Gambia: none
- World Heritage Sites in the Gambia

=== Regions of the Gambia ===
==== Administrative divisions of the Gambia ====
Administrative divisions of the Gambia

- Divisions of the Gambia
  - Districts of the Gambia

===== Divisions of the Gambia =====
Divisions of the Gambia

===== Districts of the Gambia =====
Districts of the Gambia

===== Municipalities of the Gambia =====
- Capital of the Gambia: Banjul
- Cities of the Gambia

=== Demography of the Gambia ===
Demographics of the Gambia

== Government and politics of the Gambia ==
Government of the Gambia

- Form of government: unitary presidential republic
- Capital of the Gambia: Banjul
- Elections in the Gambia
- Political parties in the Gambia

=== Executive branch of the government of the Gambia ===
- Head of state and head of government: President of the Gambia, Adama Barrow
- Cabinet of the Gambia

=== Legislative branch of the government of the Gambia ===
- National Assembly of the Gambia (unicameral)

=== Foreign relations of the Gambia ===
Foreign relations of the Gambia

- Diplomatic missions in the Gambia
- Diplomatic missions of the Gambia

==== International organization membership ====
The Republic of the Gambia is a member of:

- African, Caribbean, and Pacific Group of States (ACP)
- African Development Bank Group (AfDB)
- African Union (AU)
- African Union/United Nations Hybrid operation in Darfur (UNAMID)
- Arab Bank for Economic Development in Africa (ABEDA)
- Commonwealth of Nations
- Economic Community of West African States (ECOWAS)
- Food and Agriculture Organization (FAO)
- Group of 77 (G77)
- International Bank for Reconstruction and Development (IBRD)
- International Civil Aviation Organization (ICAO)
- International Criminal Court (ICCt)
- International Criminal Police Organization (Interpol)
- International Development Association (IDA)
- International Federation of Red Cross and Red Crescent Societies (IFRCS)
- International Finance Corporation (IFC)
- International Fund for Agricultural Development (IFAD)
- International Labour Organization (ILO)
- International Maritime Organization (IMO)
- International Monetary Fund (IMF)
- International Olympic Committee (IOC)
- International Organization for Migration (IOM)
- International Red Cross and Red Crescent Movement (ICRM)
- International Telecommunication Union (ITU)
- International Telecommunications Satellite Organization (ITSO)
- International Trade Union Confederation (ITUC)
- Inter-Parliamentary Union (IPU)
- Islamic Development Bank (IDB)
- Multilateral Investment Guarantee Agency (MIGA)
- Nonaligned Movement (NAM)
- Organisation of Islamic Cooperation (OIC)
- Organisation for the Prohibition of Chemical Weapons (OPCW)
- United Nations (UN)
- United Nations Conference on Trade and Development (UNCTAD)
- United Nations Educational, Scientific, and Cultural Organization (UNESCO)
- United Nations Industrial Development Organization (UNIDO)
- United Nations Mission in Liberia (UNMIL)
- United Nations Mission in the Central African Republic and Chad (MINURCAT)
- United Nations Operation in Cote d'Ivoire (UNOCI)
- Universal Postal Union (UPU)
- World Confederation of Labour (WCL)
- World Customs Organization (WCO)
- World Federation of Trade Unions (WFTU)
- World Health Organization (WHO)
- World Intellectual Property Organization (WIPO)
- World Meteorological Organization (WMO)
- World Tourism Organization (UNWTO)
- World Trade Organization (WTO)

=== Law and order in the Gambia ===
- Constitution of the Gambia
- Human rights in the Gambia
  - Abortion in the Gambia
  - LGBT rights in the Gambia
- Law Enforcement in The Gambia

=== Military of the Gambia ===
Military of the Gambia

== History of the Gambia ==
=== History of the Gambia by period ===
- Colonial era
- 1965 to 1970

=== History of the Gambia by subject ===
- Military history of The Gambia
- Postage stamps and postal history of the Gambia

== Culture of the Gambia ==
- National symbols of the Gambia
  - Coat of arms of the Gambia
  - Flag of the Gambia
  - National anthem of the Gambia
- Prostitution in the Gambia
- Public holidays in the Gambia
- Religion in the Gambia
  - Christianity in the Gambia
  - Islam in the Gambia
    - Ahmadiyya in the Gambia
  - Serer religion
- World Heritage Sites in the Gambia

=== Art in the Gambia ===
- Gambian literature
- Music of the Gambia

=== Sports in the Gambia ===
- Football in the Gambia
- Gambia at the Olympics

== Economy and infrastructure of the Gambia ==
Economy of the Gambia

- Economic rank, by nominal GDP (2025): 170th (one hundred and seventieth)
- Communications in the Gambia
  - Internet in the Gambia
- Currency of the Gambia: Dalasi
  - ISO 4217: GMD
- Mining in the Gambia
- Tourism in the Gambia
- Transport in the Gambia
  - Airports in the Gambia
  - Rail transport in the Gambia

== Education in the Gambia ==
Education in the Gambia

== See also ==
The Gambia

- List of Gambia-related topics
- List of international rankings
- Member state of the Commonwealth of Nations
- Member state of the United Nations
- Outline of Africa
- Outline of geography
