= Economy of the Gambia =

Economy of The Gambia
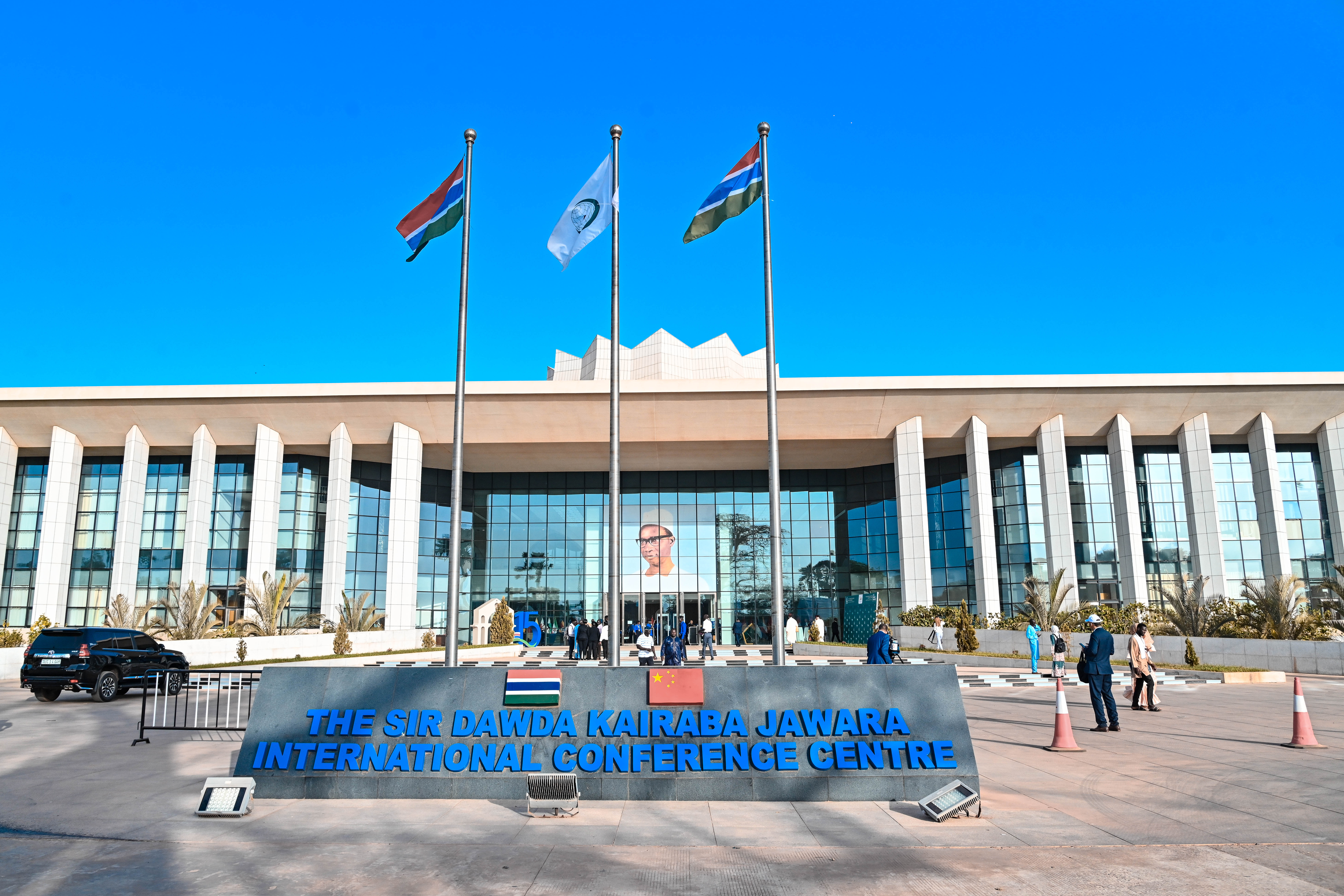
- Serrekunda is the economic centre of The Gambia
- Currency: Dalasi (GMD, D)
- Fiscal year: 1 July – 29 June
- Trade organisations: AU, AfCFTA, CEN-SAD, ECOWAS, G77, WTO
- Country group: Least developed; Low-income economy

Statistics
- Population: ▲2,468,569 (2023)
- GDP: ▲$2.77 billion (nominal; 2025); ▲$10.35 billion (PPP; 2025)
- GDP rank: 170th (nominal; 2025); 164th (PPP; 2025)
- GDP growth: 5.9% (2025); 5.0% (2026f)
- GDP per capita: ▲$987 (nominal; 2025); ▲$3,690 (PPP; 2025)
- GDP per capita rank: 174th (nominal; 2025); 164th (PPP; 2025)
- GDP per capita growth: 3.6% (2025)
- GDP by sector: agriculture: 33%; industry: 8.7%; services: 58.3%; (2008 est.)
- Inflation (CPI): 6.5% (2020 est.)
- Population below national poverty line: 48.6% (2015); 9.7% on less than $1.90/day (2020)
- Gini coefficient: 35.9 medium (2015)
- Human Development Index: ▲0.466 low (2018) (174th); 0.293 IHDI (2018)
- Labour force: ▲781,558 (2019); 53.4% employment rate (2012)
- Labour force by occupation: agriculture 75%; industry, commerce, and services 19%; government 6%
- Unemployment: 8.6%
- Average gross salary: $0.65 per man-hour (2015)
- Main industries: processing peanuts, fish, and hides; tourism; beverages; agricultural machinery assembly, woodworking, metalworking; clothing

External
- Exports: $182 million (f.o.b., 2010)
- Export goods: lumber, cashews, refined petroleum, fish oil, ground nut oil
- Main export partners: India 31.1%; China 22.8%; Italy 6.83%; Chile 6.55% (2022)
- Imports: $251 million (f.o.b., 2010)
- Import goods: clothing and apparel, refined petroleum, rice, raw sugar, palm oil
- Main import partners: China 31.5%; Senegal 12.3%; India 8.43%; Brazil 7.86% (2022)
- FDI stock: N/A (2011)
- Gross external debt: $1 Billion (2005 est.)

Public finance
- Government debt: 150% of GDP (2020)
- Revenue: D4.5 billion (2015)
- Spending: $D963.6 million (2015)
- Economic aid: $45.4 million (1995)
- All values, unless otherwise stated, are in US dollars.

The Gambia has a developing economy heavily reliant on agriculture. It has a mixed economy with a heavy reliance on agriculture, combined with relatively weak centralized economic planning and government regulation. Before 2017, under Yahya Jammeh, the Gambia had a liberal, market-based economy characterised by traditional subsistence agriculture, a historic reliance on groundnuts (peanuts) for export earnings, a re-export trade built up around its ocean port, low import duties, minimal administrative procedures, a fluctuating exchange rate with no exchange controls, and a significant tourism industry. The Gambia also has no significant mineral or other natural resources and has a limited agricultural base. About 75% of the population depends on crops and livestock for its livelihood. Small-scale manufacturing activity features the processing of peanuts, fish, and animal hides.

Short-run economic progress remains highly dependent on foreign aid, and on responsible government economic management as forwarded by International Monetary Fund technical help and advice.

== Economic history ==
The re-export trade normally constitutes a major segment of economic activity, but the 50% devaluation of the CFA franc in January 1994 made Senegalese goods more competitive and hurt the re-export trade. The Gambia has benefited from a rebound in tourism after its decline in response to the military's takeover in July 1994. Lately, Indian global health expert Dr Edmond Fernandes stated that Gambia presents a global investment opportunity and dissected various areas of business interests.

The Gambia's economy is characterized by traditional subsistence agriculture, a historic reliance on peanuts or groundnuts for export earnings, a re-export trade built up around its ocean port, low import duties, minimal administrative procedures, a fluctuating exchange rate with no exchange controls, and a significant tourism industry.

== Economic sectors ==
=== Agriculture ===
Agriculture accounts for 23% of gross domestic product (GDP) and employs 75% of the labor force. Within agriculture, peanut production accounts for 5.3% of GDP, other crops 8.3%, livestock 4.4%, fishing 1.8%, and forestry 0.5%.

=== Industry ===
Industry accounts for 12% of GDP. Manufacturing accounts for 6% of GDP. The limited amount of manufacturing is primarily agriculturally based (e.g., peanut processing, bakeries, a brewery, and a tannery). Other manufacturing activities include soap, soft drinks, and clothing. Services account for 19% of GDP.

=== Mining ===
Mining in the Gambia, which is limited to the production of clay, laterite, sand and gravel, silica sand, and zircon, does not play a significant role in the Gambian economy.

=== Tourism ===
Tourism in Gambia has three major strands. There is the traditional sun seeking holiday making use of the hot climate and wonderful beaches. The Gambia is also usually the first African destination for many European birders, due to its easily accessed and spectacular avian fauna. There are also a significant number of African Americans tracing their roots in this country, from which many Africans were taken during the slave trade. While not that many American slaves came from Gambia it was made popular by Alex Haleys historic novel and TV miniseries Roots: The Saga of an American Family.

The tourist season is the dry season, during the Northern Hemisphere winter.

== Infrastructure ==
=== Transport ===
The system of transportation in the Gambia mixes both public and private operations and consists of a system of roads (both paved and unpaved), water and air transportation. The Trans-Gambia Highway runs along both sides of the river Gambia, which bisects the country. The river may be crossed by ferry or the Senegambia bridge. There are no railways in the country.

=== Telecommunications ===
Telecommunications in the Gambia includes radio, television, fixed and mobile telephones, and the Internet.

== Trade ==
Exports of the Gambia by product category (2019) Chemical products Transportation Machines Mineral products Plastics and rubbers Metals Foodstuffs Precious metals Textiles Instruments Animal products Vegetable products Paper goods Footwear and headwear Miscellaneous Stone and glass Wood products Animal and vegetable bi-products Animal hides Arts and antiques Weapons

In 2020 The Gambia's major export markets were Senegal, Mali, Guinea-Bissau, India and China, accounting for 84% of all exports. Neighboring Senegal accounted for 50.5% of exports. This contrasted with 1999 when the UK and other EU countries were The Gambia's major domestic export markets, accounting for 86% of all exports.

In 2020 Norway, China, Cote d'Ivoire, Brazil and Turkey were the major sources of imports, accounting for 49% of the total. This contrasted with 1999 when the UK and other EU countries were the major sources of imports, accounting for 60% of all imports.

An import declaration form, prepared in triplicate, must be lodged with Customs together with the invoice, the bill of lading or air waybill, a packing list, a tax identification number and a certificate of origin where a preferential rate under the ECOWAS Trade Liberalisation Scheme is claimed. Imports of animals, plants and processed foods of plant or animal origin require an import certificate.

== Statistics ==
=== Main indicators ===
The following table shows the main economic indicators in 1980-2026. Inflation below 5% is in green.

| Year | GDP | | | GDP growth (real) | Inflation | Government debt (% of GDP) |
| Year | Total (bil. US$ PPP) | Per capita (US$ PPP) | Total (bil. US$ nominal) | GDP growth (real) | Inflation | Government debt (% of GDP) |
|---|---|---|---|---|---|---|
| 1980 | 0.7 | 971 | 0.6 | ▲0.7 | ▲5.0 | n/a |
| 1985 | ▲1.0 | ▲1200 | ▼0.5 | ▲3.6 | ▲18.3 | n/a |
| 1990 | ▲1.4 | ▲1352 | ▲0.7 | ▲5.7 | ▲12.2 | n/a |
| 1995 | ▲1.7 | ▼1344 | ▲0.9 | ▲3.3 | ▲7.0 | n/a |
| 2000 | ▲2.3 | ▲1557 | ▲1.0 | ▲5.5 | ▲0.9 | ▲73.3 |
| 2005 | ▲2.9 | ▲1742 | 1.0 | ▼ -2.4 | ▲5.0 | ▲82.6 |
| 2006 | ▲3.0 | ▼1735 | ▲1.1 | ▼ -0.6 | ▲2.1 | ▲87.3 |
| 2007 | ▲3.2 | ▲1784 | ▲1.3 | ▲3.0 | ▲5.4 | ▼38 |
| 2008 | ▲3.4 | ▲1877 | ▲1.6 | ▲6.3 | ▲4.5 | ▲39.5 |
| 2009 | ▲3.7 | ▲1957 | ▼1.5 | ▲6.7 | ▲4.6 | ▼38.9 |
| 2010 | ▲3.9 | ▲2038 | 1.5 | ▲5.9 | ▲5.0 | ▲42.9 |
| 2011 | ▼3.7 | ▼1855 | ▼1.4 | ▼ -8.1 | ▲4.8 | ▲49.2 |
| 2012 | ▲3.9 | ▲1931 | 1.4 | ▲5.2 | ▲4.6 | ▲49.5 |
| 2013 | ▲4.1 | ▲1962 | 1.4 | ▲2.9 | ▲5.2 | ▲58.2 |
| 2014 | 4.1 | ▼1913 | ▼1.2 | ▼ -1.4 | ▲6.3 | ▲71.1 |
| 2015 | ▲4.3 | ▲1955 | ▲1.4 | ▲4.1 | ▲6.8 | ▼69.4 |
| 2016 | ▲4.5 | ▲1960 | ▲1.5 | ▲1.9 | ▲7.2 | ▲79.5 |
| 2017 | ▲4.8 | ▲2039 | 1.5 | ▲4.8 | ▲8.0 | ▲87 |
| 2018 | ▲5.5 | ▲2277 | ▲1.7 | ▲7.2 | ▲6.5 | ▼83.6 |
| 2019 | ▲6.0 | ▲2418 | ▲1.8 | ▲6.2 | ▲7.1 | ▼83 |
| 2020 | ▲6.4 | ▲2523 | 1.8 | ▲0.6 | ▲5.9 | ▲85.9 |
| 2021 | ▲7.2 | ▲2767 | ▲2.0 | ▲5.3 | ▲7.4 | ▼83.1 |
| 2022 | ▲8.1 | ▲3049 | ▲2.1 | ▲5.5 | ▲11.5 | ▲83.9 |
| 2023 | ▲8.9 | ▲3266 | ▲2.3 | ▲5.9 | ▲17.0 | ▼77.4 |
| 2024 | ▲9.6 | ▲3447 | ▲2.4 | ▲5.6 | ▲11.6 | ▲78.5 |
| 2025 | ▲10.5 | ▲3665 | ▲2.6 | ▲6.0 | ▲7.9 | ▼73.9 |
| 2026 | ▲11.3 | ▲3865 | ▲2.8 | ▲5.1 | ▲5.8 | ▼68.3 |

=== Other indicators ===
Electricity

production: 510 GWh, 99% from fossil fuels (2024)
consumption: 410 GWh (2024)
The Gambia started importing electricity for the first time in 2023 after completion of the OMVG (Gambia River Basin Development Organization) Interconnection Project.

Agriculture - products: peanuts, pearl millet, sorghum, rice, maize, cassava (tapioca), palm kernels; cattle, sheep, goats; forest and fishery resources not fully exploited.

Economic aid - recipient: $343.86 million (2023)

== See also ==
- Transport in the Gambia
- Telecommunications in the Gambia
- Mining industry of the Gambia
- United Nations Economic Commission for Africa
