= Prime Bank =

Prime Bank may refer to:

- Prime Bank PLC., a commercial bank in Bangladesh, established in 1995
- Prime Bank (Gambia), a commercial bank in the Gambia, established in 2009 - a subsidiary of Lebanese Canadian Bank
- Prime Bank (Kenya), a commercial bank in Kenya, established in 1992
- Prime Commercial Bank Limited, Nepal
- "Prime bank fraud," a type of bank fraud
- Prime Bank Cricket Club, a List-A team in Bangladesh
