= ISO 3166-2:GM =

Entry for the Gambia in ISO 3166-2

ISO 3166-2:GM is the entry for the Gambia in ISO 3166-2, part of the ISO 3166 standard published by the International Organization for Standardization (ISO), which defines codes for the names of the principal subdivisions (e.g., provinces or states) of all countries coded in ISO 3166-1.

Currently for the Gambia, ISO 3166-2 codes are defined for one city and five divisions. The city Banjul is the capital of the country and has special status equal to the divisions.

Each code consists of two parts, separated by a hyphen. The first part is GM, the ISO 3166-1 alpha-2 code of the Gambia. The second part is a letter. The code for Central River is from its former name, MacCarthy Island.

== Current codes ==
Subdivision names are listed as in the ISO 3166-2 standard published by the ISO 3166 Maintenance Agency (ISO 3166/MA).

Click on the button in the header to sort each column.

Code	Subdivision name (en)	Subdivision category
GM-B	Banjul	city
GM-M	Central River	division
GM-L	Lower River	division
GM-N	North Bank	division
GM-U	Upper River	division
GM-W	Western	division

== Changes ==
The following changes to the entry are listed on ISO's online catalogue, the Online Browsing Platform:

Effective date of change	Short description of change (en)
2014-12-18	Alignment of the English short name lower case and the English full name with UNTERM
2014-11-03	Update List Source

== See also ==
- Subdivisions of the Gambia
- FIPS region codes of the Gambia
- Neighbouring country: SN
