= Mining industry of the Gambia =

Mining in the Gambia, which is limited to the production of clay, laterite, sand and gravel, silica sand, and zircon, does not play a significant role in the Gambian economy.

== Legal framework ==
The Department of State for Trade, Industry, and Employment is the government entity responsible for the administration of the mining sector. A new mineral and mining law proposed in 2001 was still under consideration for approval by the Government as of 2005. The government has put in place policies to attract foreign direct investment, including free repatriation of capital and profits, special Investment certificates, and constitutional guarantees and safeguards against nationalization and expropriation of investments.

== Mining ==
As of 2005, Carnegie Corporation Ltd. (CCL) of Australia (50%) in joint venture with Astron of China (50%) held an exclusive prospecting license for the Batukunku, the Kartung, and the Sanyang mineral sands deposits in Brufut. In 2005, the joint venture completed a second-round trial dredge program at the deposit. Following the completion of this dredge program and of an environmental impact assessment study, the company submitted an application to convert its prospecting license to a mining lease. As of the end of 2005, CCL continued to wait for Government approval. As of 2005, total measured, indicated, and inferred resources at the Batukunku, the Kartung, and the Sanyang deposits were estimated to be 18.8 million metric tons (Mt) that contained approximately one Mt of heavy minerals at a cutoff grade of 1%. The heavy-mineral assemblage for these deposits was estimated to be about 71% ilmenite, 15% zircon, 3% rutile, and 11% other.
