= Prime Bank (Gambia) =

Bank of the Gambia

Prime Bank (Gambia) Limited
- Company type: Private
- Industry: Financial services
- Founded: 2009
- Headquarters: 42 Kairaba Avenue, Serrekunda, Gambia
- Products: Loans, Checking, Savings, Investments, Debit Cards
- Website: None

Prime Bank (Gambia) Limited, commonly known as Prime Bank (Gambia), was a private commercial bank in the Gambia. It was the 12th commercial bank to be licensed in the country. The bank was a subsidiary of the now defunct Lebanese Canadian Bank (LCB).

== History ==
The Lebanese Canadian Bank (LCB), the parent company of Prime Bank (Gambia), operated from 1968 through 1988 as a subsidiary of the Royal Bank of Canada Middle East. LCB was among the top ten league banks in Lebanon, known as the Alpha Group, but was shut down after the intervention of the U.S. Law enforcement and regulatory community. Prime Bank (Gambia) was LCB's first African subsidiary. LCB has been working to set up a subsidiary sn in the Democratic Republic of the Congo (DRC). In January 2013, in light of US investigations, the investors in the institution decided to close down the bank by withholding new capital injection, to meet new capital requirements by the Central Bank of The Gambia (CBG).

== See also ==
- List of banks in Gambia
