= ECOMIL =

West African peacekeeping force

ECOWAS mission in Liberia (ECOMIL) was a peacekeeping force sent by the Economic Community of West African States (ECOWAS) to Liberia at the end of Second Liberian Civil War in September 2003.

During the First Liberian Civil War in July 1990 ECOWAS adopted the "ECOWAS Peace Plan for Liberia" which ordered the formation of the ECOWAS Monitoring Group in Liberia (ECOMOG). ECOMOG stayed in Liberia until February 1998.

Renewed crisis in Liberia during 2003 led to ECOWAS deploying a second peacekeeping operation in the region, after a Comprehensive Peace Agreement was reached on 18 August 2003. ECOMIL began deploying outside Monrovia from 9 September 2003, with 3 563 troops from Nigeria, Mali and Senegal under Force Commander, Brigadier General Festus Okonkwo. The UNSC approved conversion of ECOMIL into a UN International Stabilisation Force from 1 October 2003.
