= United Nations Multilingual Terminology Database =

Utility which translates U.N. terminology and nomenclature

The United Nations Multilingual Terminology Database (UNTERM) is a linguistic tool which translates terminology and nomenclature used within the United Nations (UN) in the six official languages of the UN (Arabic, Chinese, English, French, Russian and Spanish). The database contains more than 85,000 words and is updated daily.

The database is maintained by Terminology and Reference Section, Documentation Division, Department of General Assembly and Conference Management, with its headquarters in New York City. The database has been put on the Internet in order to facilitate the understanding of the work of the UN by the public who do not have access to the intranet of the UN Secretariat.
