= Telecommunications in the Gambia =

Telecommunications in the Gambia includes radio, television, fixed and mobile telephones, and the Internet.

== Radio and television ==
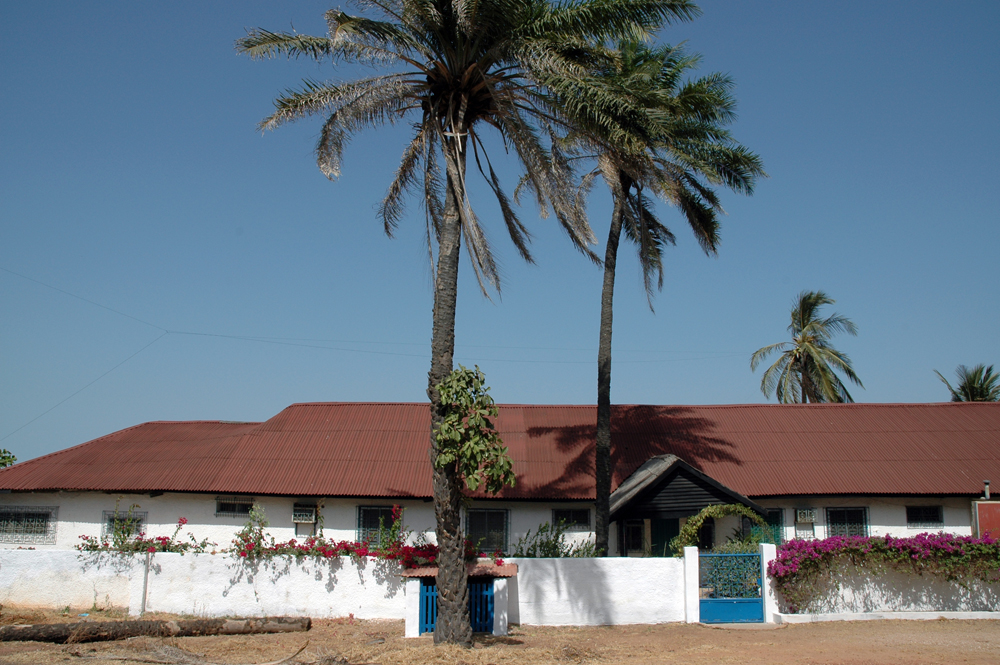
Radio Syd near Banjul

- Radio: The state-owned Gambia Radio and Television Service has two AM stations (Bonto, Basse) and three FM stations (Bonto, Serrekunda, Banjul). There are also seven private FM stations in Serrekunda, Banjul, and Basse. There are nine community FM radio stations.Transmissions of multiple international broadcasters are available, some via shortwave radio (2007).
- Radio sets: 196,000 (1997).
- Television: The Gambia Radio and Television Service operates a single-channel TV service with the main transmitter at Banjul and numerous relay stations. Transmissions of multiple international broadcasters are available; cable and satellite TV subscription services are obtainable in some parts of the country (2007). Today, there are five more radio stations in the Gambia.
- Television sets: 4,000 (1997).

== Telephones ==
- Calling code: +220
- International call prefix: 00
- Main lines: 64,200 lines in use, 159th in the world (2012).
- Mobile cellular: 1.5 million lines, 151st in the world (2012).
- Teledensity: ~80 per 100 persons, combined fixed-line and mobile-cellular (2011).
- Domestic:
  - Adequate microwave radio relay and open-wire network (2011).
  - State-owned Gambia Telecommunications Company (Gamtel) partially privatized in 2007.
- International:
  - Microwave radio relay: Links to Senegal and Guinea-Bissau (2011).
  - Satellite earth station: 1 Intelsat (Atlantic Ocean) (2011).
  - Communications cables: Africa Coast to Europe (ACE) fiber-optic submarine cable (2011).

== Internet ==
- Top-level domain: .gm
- Internet users: 229,122 users, 151st in the world; 12.4% of the population, 165th in the world (2012).
- Fixed broadband: 497 subscriptions, 188th in the world; less than 0.05% of the population, 178th in the world (2012).
- Wireless broadband: 22,435 subscriptions, 131st in the world; 1.2% of the population, 132nd in the world (2012).
- Internet hosts: 656 hosts, 179th in the world (2012).
- IPv4: 21,504 addresses allocated, less than 0.05% of the world total, 11.7 addresses per 1000 people (2012).

=== Internet censorship and surveillance ===
The Gambia is not individually classified by the OpenNet Initiative (ONI), but is classified as engaged in selective Internet filtering based on the limited descriptions in the ONI 2009 profile for the sub-Saharan Africa region.

There are no government restrictions on access to the Internet or reports that the government monitors e-mail or Internet chat rooms without appropriate legal authority. Individuals and groups can generally engage in the peaceful expression of views via the Internet, including by e-mail. However, Internet users reported they could not access the Web sites of foreign online newspapers Freedom, The Gambia Echo, Hellogambia, and Jollofnews, which criticized the government.

The constitution and law provide for freedom of speech and press; however, the government restricted these rights. According to the Observatory for the Protection of Human Rights Defenders, "the environment for independent and opposition media remained hostile, with numerous obstacles to freedom of expression, including administrative hurdles, arbitrary arrest and detention, intimidation and judicial harassment against journalists, and the closure of media outlets, leading to self-censorship." Individuals who publicly or privately criticized the government or the president risked government reprisal. In March 2011 President Jammeh warned independent journalists that he would "not compromise or sacrifice the peace, security, stability, dignity, and the well being of Gambians for the sake of freedom of expression." Accusing some journalists of being the "mouthpiece of opposition parties," he vowed to prosecute any journalist who offended him. The National Intelligence Agency (NIA) was involved in arbitrary closure of media outlets and the extrajudicial detention of journalists.

In 2007 a Gambian journalist living in the US was convicted of sedition for an article published online; she was fined US$12,000; in 2006 the Gambian police ordered all subscribers to an online independent newspaper to report to the police or face arrest.

The constitution and law prohibit arbitrary interference with privacy, family, home, or correspondence, but the government does not respect these prohibitions. Observers believe the government monitors citizens engaged in activities that it deems objectionable.

In recent years before the 2016 election social media like WhatsApp, Facebook and Skype have been temporarily blocked in The Gambia. Since 30 November 2016, the evening before the presidential election, internet access, mobile communication and phone calls have been completely shut down by all providers, as ordered by the president of The Gambia.

== See also ==
- Africell, mobile telecommunications company operating in The Gambia, Sierra Leone, and the Democratic Republic of the Congo.
- Gamtel, the Gambia Telecommunications Company.
- Qcell, Qcell Gambia Co. Ltd., the Gambia Telecommunications Company.
- Comium, Comium Gambia Co. Ltd., Telecommunications Company, is fully owned subsidiary of the Comium Group Luxemburg.
- Netpage Ltd., Netpage Gambia Co. Ltd., Telecommunications Company.
- Quantum Ltd., QuantumNet Gambia Co. Ltd., Telecommunications Company.
- Vizocom, a global satellite internet provider with coverage in the African continent
