= The Gambia =

Country in West Africa

Republic of The Gambia
- Flag Coat of arms
- Motto: "Progress, Peace, and Prosperity"
- Anthem: "For The Gambia Our Homeland"
- Location of the Gambia (dark green) in western Africa
- Capital: Banjul; 13°27′00″N 16°34′30″W
- Largest metropolitan area: Serekunda
- Official languages: English
- National languages: List: Mandinka; Pulaar; Wolof; Serer; Jola; English; Balanta; Arabic; Jola-Fonyi; Mandjak; Mankanya; Noon; Dyula; Soninke; Fula; Karon; Kassonke; Cangin; Gambian Sign Language
- Ethnic groups (2024 Population and Housing Census): 34.4% Mandinka; 25.0% Fula; 15.4% Wolof; 9.5% Jola; 8.2% Soninke; 2.9% Serer; 4.6% other
- Religion (2024): 95.7% Islam; 4.2% Christianity; 0.1% others
- Demonym: Gambian
- Government: Unitary presidential republic
  - President: Adama Barrow
  - Vice President: Muhammad B. S. Jallow
  - Speaker of the National Assembly: Fabakary Tombong Jatta
  - Chief Justice: Hassan Bubacar Jallow
- Legislature: National Assembly

Independence from the United Kingdom
  - Independence achieved: 18 February 1965
  - Dissolution of the Senegambia Confederation: 30 September 1989

Area
  - Total: 11,300 km^{2} (4,400 sq mi) (159th)
  - Water (%): 11.5

Population
  - 2024 census: ▲2,422,712 (142nd)
  - Density: 227/km^{2} (587.9/sq mi) (51st)
- GDP (PPP): 2026 estimate
  - Total: ▲$11.050 billion (166th)
  - Per capita: ▲$3,820 (175th)
- GDP (nominal): 2026 estimate
  - Total: ▲$2.670 billion (185th)
  - Per capita: ▲$924 (180th)
- Gini (2015): ▼35.9 medium inequality
- HDI (2023): ▲0.524 low (170th)
- Currency: Gambian dalasi (GMD)
- Time zone: UTC±00:00 (GMT)
- Calling code: +220
- ISO 3166 code: GM
- Internet TLD: .gm

The Gambia, officially the Republic of The Gambia, (Note: Mandinka: Kambiya ߞߊߡߓߌߦߊ; Wolof: Gámbi, Fula: Gammbi, Serer: Gambi; Arabic: غامبيا/جامبيا) is a country in West Africa. Geographically, the Gambia is the smallest country in continental Africa; (Note: Cape Verde, Mauritius, São Tomé and Príncipe, and Seychelles, the smallest country in Africa, are archipelagos.) it is bounded by Senegal on all sides except for the western part, which is bordered by the Atlantic Ocean.

Its territory is on both sides of the lower reaches of the Gambia River, which flows through the center of the country and empties into the Atlantic. The national namesake river demarcates the elongated shape of the country, which has an area of 11,300 square kilometres (4,400 sq mi) and a population of 2,422,712 people at the 1 May 2024 census, which is a 30.45% population increase from 2013. The capital city is the island Banjul, formerly called Bathurst during the colonial era, which is the most extensive metropolitan area in the country. The second- and third-largest cities are Serekunda and Brikama. Other significant cities are Kanifing and Farafenni on the north bank, Basse in Upper River Region, and Soma in the lower river region.

From prehistory, the Trans-Saharan trade, peaking in the 8th century to the early 17th century, connected Gambia to Africa's North-East. In the 9th and 10th centuries, Arab Muslims brought Sunni Islam to the Western Sahara and Gambia. In 1455, the Portuguese were the first Europeans to enter the Gambia, although they never established significant trade there. The British Empire established a colony in 1765. In 1965, 200 years later, the Gambia gained independence under the leadership of Dawda Jawara. Jawara remained the president, winning several elections, until he was overthrown by Yahya Jammeh in a bloodless coup on 22 July 1994.

Adama Barrow was elected as the Gambia's third president in December 2016. He defeated Yahya Jammeh with the help of a coalition of other opposition political parties. Jammeh initially accepted the results, but then refused to leave office claiming he was cheated, triggering a constitutional crisis. The Economic Community of West African States (ECOWAS) conducted a military intervention and achieved Jammeh's removal two days after his term was initially scheduled to end. In a swearing-in ceremony at the Gambian embassy in Dakar, Senegal, on 19 January 2017, Adama Barrow formally became president of the Gambia.

The Gambia's economy is dominated by farming, fishing, and especially tourism. In 2022, 17.2% of the population lived in extreme poverty, defined as living on less than US$2.15 (2017 PPP) per day. The Gambia is a founding member of the ECOWAS. It rejoined the Commonwealth of Nations in 2018 after previously withdrawing in 2013. English is the country's sole official language; it became widely used during British rule.

== Etymology ==
The name "Gambia" is derived from the Mandinka term Kambra/Kambaa, meaning the Gambia River. (It may be derived from the sacred Serer gamba, a drum made from a calabash beaten when a Serer elder dies.) Portuguese explorers, who reached the region in the 15th century, adopted a variation of this local name, which was later anglicised to Gambia during British colonial rule.

Upon independence in 1965, the country used the name The Gambia. Following the proclamation of a republic in 1970, the long-form name of the country became the Republic of The Gambia.

The Gambia is one of only two countries for which the definite article "the" is officially used in its short form English-language name, the other being the Bahamas. (Note: El Salvador, Spanish for "The Saviour", also uses the definite article in its name.) In 1964, shortly prior to the country's independence, Prime Minister Dawda Jawara wrote to the Permanent Committee on Geographical Names for British Official Use requesting that the name the Gambia retain the definite article, in part to reduce confusion with Zambia which had also recently become independent.

The administration of Yahya Jammeh changed the long-form name to Islamic Republic of the Gambia in December 2015. On 29 January 2017 newly elected President Adama Barrow changed the name back to Republic of The Gambia.

== History ==
=== Muslim and Portuguese influence (9th–16th centuries) ===
Arab traders provided the first written accounts of the Gambia area in the ninth and tenth centuries. During the tenth century, Muslim merchants and scholars established communities in several West African commercial centres. Both groups established trans-Saharan trade routes. They carried out a large export trade of local people taken captive in raids and sold as slaves. Gold and ivory were also exported, and the trade routes were used to import manufactured goods to these areas.

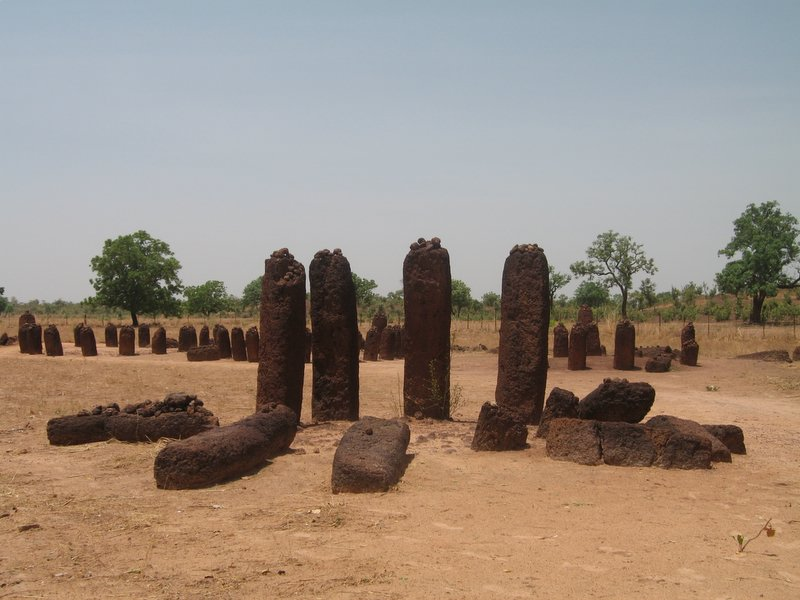
Senegambian stone circles (megaliths) run from Senegal through the Gambia. They are described by UNESCO as "the largest concentration of stone circles seen anywhere in the world".

By the 11th or 12th century, the rulers of kingdoms such as Takrur (a monarchy centred on the Senegal River just to the north), ancient Ghana and Gao had converted to Islam. They had appointed to their courts Muslims who were literate in the Arabic language. At the beginning of the 14th century, most of what is today called the Gambia was part of the Mali Empire. The Portuguese reached this area by sea in the mid-15th century and began to dominate overseas trade.

=== English and French administration (17th–19th centuries) ===
In 1588, the claimant to the Portuguese throne, António, Prior of Crato, sold exclusive trade rights on the Gambia River to English merchants. Letters patent from Queen Elizabeth I confirmed the grant. In 1618, King James I of England granted a charter to an English company for trade with the Gambia and the Gold Coast (now Ghana). Between 1651 and 1661, some parts of the Gambia – St. Andrew's Island in the Gambia River, including Fort Jakob, and St. Mary Island (modern day Banjul) and Fort Jillifree – came under the rule of the Duchy of Courland and Semigallia, a vassal state of Polish-Lithuanian Commonwealth in what is now Latvia, having been bought by Prince Jacob Kettler. The colonies were formally ceded to England in 1664.

During the late 17th century and throughout the 18th century, the British Empire and the French Empire struggled continually for political and commercial supremacy in the regions of the Senegal River and the Gambia River. The British Empire occupied the Gambia when an expedition led by Augustus Keppel landed there following the capture of Senegal in 1758. The 1783 Treaty of Versailles gave Great Britain possession of the Gambia River, but the French retained a tiny enclave at Albreda on the river's north bank. This was finally ceded to the United Kingdom in 1856.

==== Slavery ====
Slave ships intercepted by the Royal Navy's West Africa Squadron in the Atlantic were also returned to the Gambia, with people who had been slaves released on MacCarthy Island far up the Gambia River where they were expected to establish new lives. The British established the military post of Bathurst (now Banjul) in 1816.

=== Gambia Colony and Protectorate (1821–1965) ===
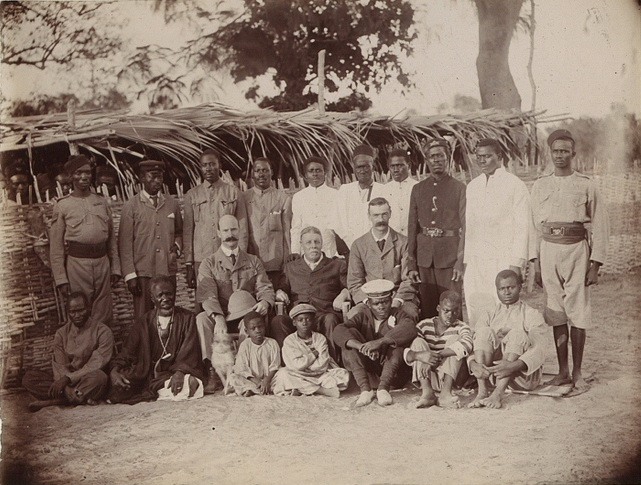
The British Governor, George Chardin Denton (1901–1911), and his party, 1905

In the ensuing years, Bathurst (now Banjul) was at times under the jurisdiction of the British Governor-General in Sierra Leone. In 1888, the Gambia became a separate colony.

An agreement between Britain and France in 1889 established the boundaries of the colony. In 1891, a joint Anglo-French Boundary Commission faced resistance from local leaders whose lands would be divided. The Gambia became a British Crown colony called British Gambia, divided for administrative purposes into the colony (city of Banjul and the surrounding area) and the protectorate (remainder of the territory). The Gambia received its own executive and legislative councils in 1901, and it gradually progressed toward self-government. Slavery was abolished in 1906 and following a brief conflict between the British colonial forces and indigenous Gambians, British colonial authority was firmly established. In 1919, a romantic relationship between Travelling Commissioner J. K. McCallum and Wolof woman Fatou Khan scandalised the administration.

During World War II, some soldiers fought with the Allies of World War II. Though these soldiers fought mostly in Burma, some died closer to home and a Commonwealth War Graves Commission cemetery is in Fajara (close to Banjul). Banjul contained an airstrip for the US Army Air Forces and a port of call for Allied naval convoys.

After World War II, the pace of constitutional reform increased. Following general elections in 1962, the United Kingdom granted full internal self-governance in the following year.

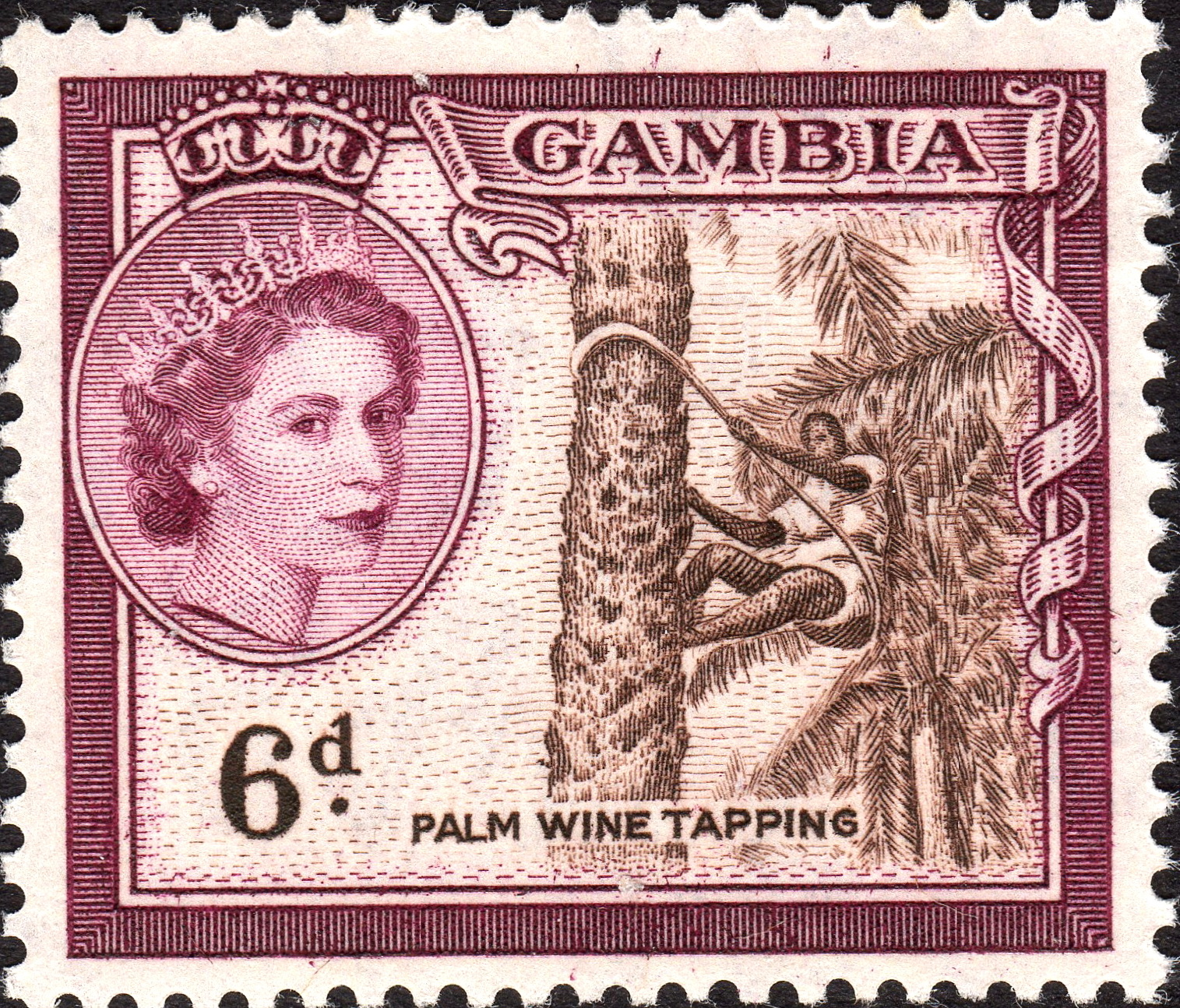
Stamp with portrait of Queen Elizabeth II, 1953

=== Contemporary (1965–present) ===
==== Independence and formation of the republic ====
The Gambia achieved independence on 18 February 1965, as a constitutional monarchy within the Commonwealth, with Elizabeth II as Queen of The Gambia, represented by the Governor-General. Shortly thereafter, the national government held a referendum proposing that the country become a republic. This referendum failed to receive the two-thirds majority required to amend the constitution, but the results won widespread attention abroad as testimony to the Gambia's observance of secret balloting, honest elections, civil rights, and liberties.

On 24 April 1970, the Gambia became a Republic within the Commonwealth, following a second referendum. Prime Minister Sir Dawda Kairaba Jawara assumed the office of President, an Executive Post, combining the offices of head of state and head of government which he held since 1962. President Sir Dawda Jawara was re-elected five times.

An attempted coup on 29 July 1981 followed a weakening of the economy and allegations of corruption against leading politicians. The coup attempt occurred while President Jawara was attending the Royal Wedding of Prince Charles and Lady Diana in London and was carried out by a rogue group of leftists calling themselves the National Revolutionary Council, composed of Kukoi Samba Sanyang's Socialist and Revolutionary Labour Party (SRLP) and elements of the Field Force, a paramilitary force which constituted the bulk of the country's armed forces.

President Jawara requested military aid from Senegal, which deployed 400 troops to the Gambia on 31 July. By 6 August, some 2,700 Senegalese troops had been deployed, defeating the rebel force. Between 500 and 800 people were killed during the coup and the ensuing violence.

In 1982, in the aftermath of the 1981 attempted coup, Senegal and the Gambia signed a treaty of confederation. The Senegambia Confederation aimed to combine the armed forces of the two states and to unify their economies and currencies. The Gambia permanently withdrew from the confederation in 1989.

==== Following dissolution of the Senegambia Confederation ====
In 1994, the Armed Forces Provisional Ruling Council (AFPRC) deposed the Jawara government and banned opposition political activity. Lieutenant Yahya Jammeh, chairman of the AFPRC, became head of state. Jammeh was just 29 years old at the time of the coup. The AFPRC announced a transition plan to return to a democratic civilian government.

The Provisional Independent Electoral Commission (PIEC) was established in December 1995 to conduct national elections and it supervised a referendum on a revised Constitution, the elections for president and the National Assembly by early January 1997. In 1997 the Independent Electoral Commission – IEC- The Gambia was established to replace the PIEC, responsible for the registration of voters and for the conduct of elections and referendums.

The IEC organised the next 5-year elections for late 2001 and early 2002, and the Gambia completed a full cycle of presidential, legislative, and local elections, which foreign observers deemed free, fair, and transparent. President Yahya Jammeh, who was elected to continue in the position he had assumed during the coup, took the oath of office again on 21 December 2001. Jammeh's Alliance for Patriotic Reorientation and Construction (APRC) maintained its strong majority in the National Assembly, particularly after the main opposition United Democratic Party (UDP) boycotted the legislative elections.

On 2 October 2013, the Gambian Interior Minister announced that the Gambia would leave the Commonwealth with immediate effect, ending 48 years of membership of the organisation. The Gambian government said it had "decided that The Gambia will never be a member of any Neo-Colonial institution and will never be a party to any institution that represents an extension of colonialism".

On 11 December 2015, President Jammeh (without any legal authority) unilaterally declared the Gambia an Islamic Republic, calling it a break from the country's colonial past, although the constitution remained secular.

The months leading up to the 2016 presidential election were tense. The youth leader of the main opposition UDP, Solo Sandeng, died in detention at the notorious National Intelligence Agency. Ousainou Darboe, the leader of the UDP, and many senior members of his party were sent to jail for demanding the release of Solo Sandeng dead or alive. President Jammeh faced opposition leaders Adama Barrow from the Independent Coalition of parties and Mamma Kandeh from the Gambia Democratic Congress party. The high court of the Gambia sentenced main opposition leader and human rights advocate Ousainou Darboe to 3 years in prison in July 2016, disqualifying him from running in the presidential election. This gave Adama Barrow to contest under the UDP ticket.

Following the 1 December 2016 elections, the elections commission declared Adama Barrow the winner. Jammeh, who had ruled for 22 years, first announced he would step down after losing the 2016 election before declaring the results void and calling for a new vote, sparking a constitutional crisis and leading to an invasion by an ECOWAS coalition. On 20 January 2017, Jammeh announced that he had agreed to step down and would leave the country.

In January 2017, President Barrow removed the "Islamic" title from the Gambia's name. On 14 February 2017, the Gambia began the process of returning to its membership of the Commonwealth and formally presented its application to re-join to Secretary-General Patricia Scotland on 22 January 2018. Boris Johnson, who became the first British foreign secretary to visit the Gambia since the country gained independence in 1965, announced that the British government welcomed the Gambia's return to the Commonwealth. The Gambia officially rejoined the Commonwealth on 8 February 2018. On 28 February 2018, Jaha Dukureh, a women's rights activist was nominated for the Nobel Peace Prize for her work in combating female genital mutilation.

On 4 December 2021, Adama Barrow won re-election in the presidential election. On 20 December 2022, a supposed coup attempt by the Gambian army was foiled, with four soldiers arrested. The Gambian Armed Forces have denied that any attempt at a coup was made. Barrow's use of foreign troops for his security and for protection of some infrastructure has hurt his popularity.

== Geography ==
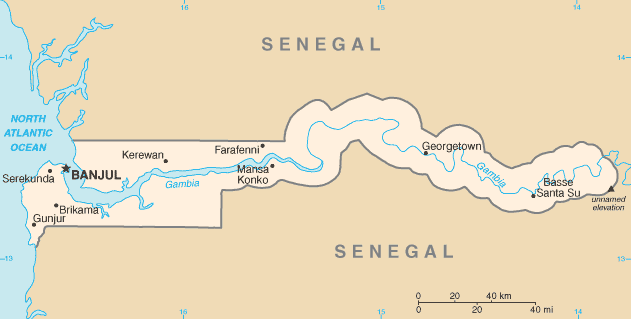
Map of the Gambia

The Gambia is a small and narrow country whose borders mirror the meandering Gambia River. It lies between latitudes 13 and 14°N, and longitudes 13 and 17°W.

The Gambia is less than 50 kilometres (31 miles) wide at its widest point, with a total area of 11,295 km^{2} (4,361 sq mi). About 1,300 square kilometres (500 square miles) (11.5%) of the Gambia's area are covered by water. It is the smallest country on the African mainland. In comparative terms, the Gambia has a total area slightly more than that of the island of Jamaica.

Senegal surrounds the Gambia on three sides, with 80 km (50 mi) of coastline on the Atlantic Ocean marking its western extremity.

The present boundaries were defined in 1889 after an agreement between the United Kingdom and France. During the negotiations between the French and the British in Paris, the French initially gave the British around 320 kilometres (200 mi) of the Gambia River to control. Starting with the placement of boundary markers in 1891, it took nearly 15 years after the Paris meetings to determine the final borders of the Gambia. The resulting series of straight lines and arcs gave the British control of areas about 16 kilometres (10 mi) north and south of the Gambia River.

The Gambia contains three terrestrial ecoregions: Guinean forest-savanna mosaic, West Sudanian savanna, and Guinean mangroves. It had a 2018 Forest Landscape Integrity Index mean score of 4.56/10, ranking it 120th globally out of 172 countries.

=== Climate ===
The Gambia has a tropical savannah climate. A short rainy season normally lasts from June until September, but from then until May, lower temperatures predominate, with less precipitation. The climate in the Gambia closely resembles that of neighbouring Senegal, Mali, and the northern part of Guinea.

Climate data for Banjul
Month	Jan	Feb	Mar	Apr	May	Jun	Jul	Aug	Sep	Oct	Nov	Dec	Year
Record high °C (°F)	37.2 (99.0)	38.9 (102.0)	40.6 (105.1)	41.1 (106.0)	41.1 (106.0)	37.8 (100.0)	33.9 (93.0)	33.3 (91.9)	34.4 (93.9)	37.2 (99.0)	35.6 (96.1)	35.6 (96.1)	41.1 (106.0)
Mean daily maximum °C (°F)	31.7 (89.1)	33.5 (92.3)	33.9 (93.0)	33.0 (91.4)	31.9 (89.4)	31.9 (89.4)	30.8 (87.4)	30.2 (86.4)	31.0 (87.8)	31.8 (89.2)	32.7 (90.9)	31.9 (89.4)	32.0 (89.6)
Mean daily minimum °C (°F)	15.7 (60.3)	16.6 (61.9)	17.9 (64.2)	18.8 (65.8)	20.3 (68.5)	22.9 (73.2)	23.6 (74.5)	23.3 (73.9)	22.6 (72.7)	22.2 (72.0)	18.8 (65.8)	16.2 (61.2)	19.9 (67.8)
Record low °C (°F)	7.2 (45.0)	10.0 (50.0)	11.7 (53.1)	12.2 (54.0)	13.9 (57.0)	18.3 (64.9)	20.0 (68.0)	20.0 (68.0)	17.2 (63.0)	16.1 (61.0)	12.2 (54.0)	8.9 (48.0)	7.2 (45.0)
Average rainfall mm (inches)	0.5 (0.02)	0.0 (0.0)	0.0 (0.0)	0.0 (0.0)	1.3 (0.05)	62.7 (2.47)	232.4 (9.15)	346.8 (13.65)	255.1 (10.04)	75.8 (2.98)	1.6 (0.06)	0.7 (0.03)	976.9 (38.46)
Average rainy days	0	0	0	0	0	5	14	19	16	6	0	0	60
Average relative humidity (%)	47	47	50	58	67	73	81	85	84	80	69	55	67
Mean monthly sunshine hours	207.7	237.3	266.6	252.0	229.4	201.0	182.9	189.1	183.0	217.0	246.0	210.8	2,622.8
Mean daily sunshine hours	6.7	8.4	8.6	8.4	7.4	6.7	5.9	6.1	6.1	7.0	8.2	6.8	7.2
Source 1: World Meteorological Organization
Source 2: Deutscher Wetterdienst (extremes, humidity, and sun)

=== Nature and wildlife ===
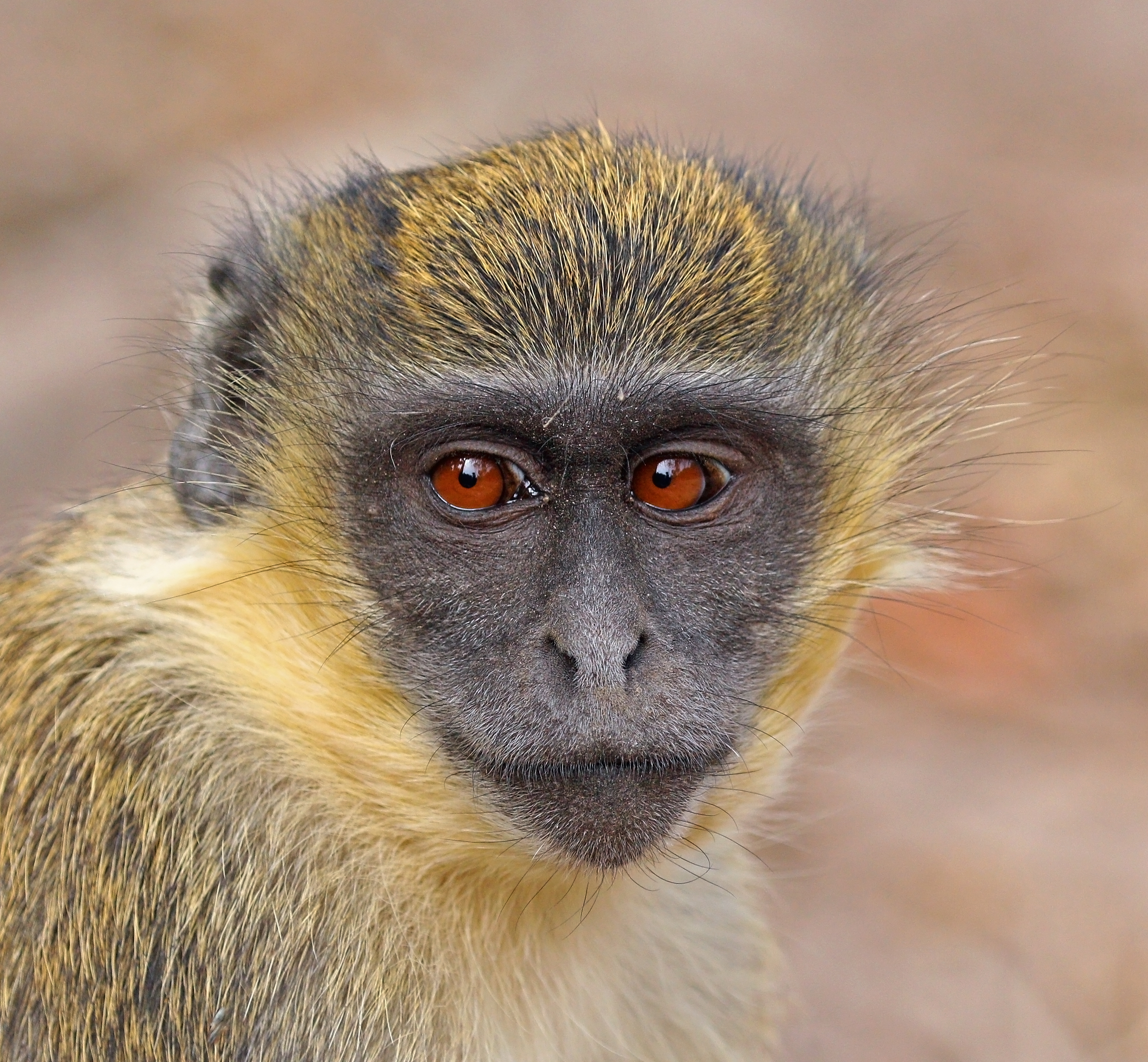
The Gambia's wildlife, like this green monkey, attracts tourists

Biodiversity in the Gambia is extremely rich given the country's size, and considered to be of global significance. Plant assemblages consist of mangrove swamp along the river, wetland in lowland areas through to savanna woodland and a plateau dominated by sandhills in the upland region. There is a rich array of birdlife, with over 500 resident species. The national animal is the spotted hyena. Pygmy hippopotamuses and crocodiles may be found in the river system, while common African species such as chimpanzees, baboons, antelopes, and warthogs are also present. 30 amphibian and 74 reptile species have been recorded including tortoises, snakes and various lizards; while over 500 fish species can be found in the marine and aquatic environments together with marine mammals including dolphins, whales and the rare West African manatee.

== Government and politics ==
The Gambia gained independence from the United Kingdom on 18 February 1965. From 1965 to 1994, the country was ostensibly a multi-party liberal democracy. It was ruled by Sir Dawda Jawara and his People's Progressive Party (PPP). However, the country never experienced political turnover during this period and its commitment to succession by the ballot box was never tested. In 1994, a military coup propelled a commission of military officers to power, known as the Armed Forces Provisional Ruling Council (AFPRC). After two years of direct rule, a new constitution was written and in 1996, the leader of the AFPRC, Yahya Jammeh, was elected as president. He ruled in an authoritarian style until the 2016 election, which was won by Adama Barrow, backed by a coalition of opposition parties.

According to the 2023 V-Dem Democracy Indices, the Gambia is ranked 68th of 179 nations worldwide and the 11th of 56 in Africa.

=== Political history ===
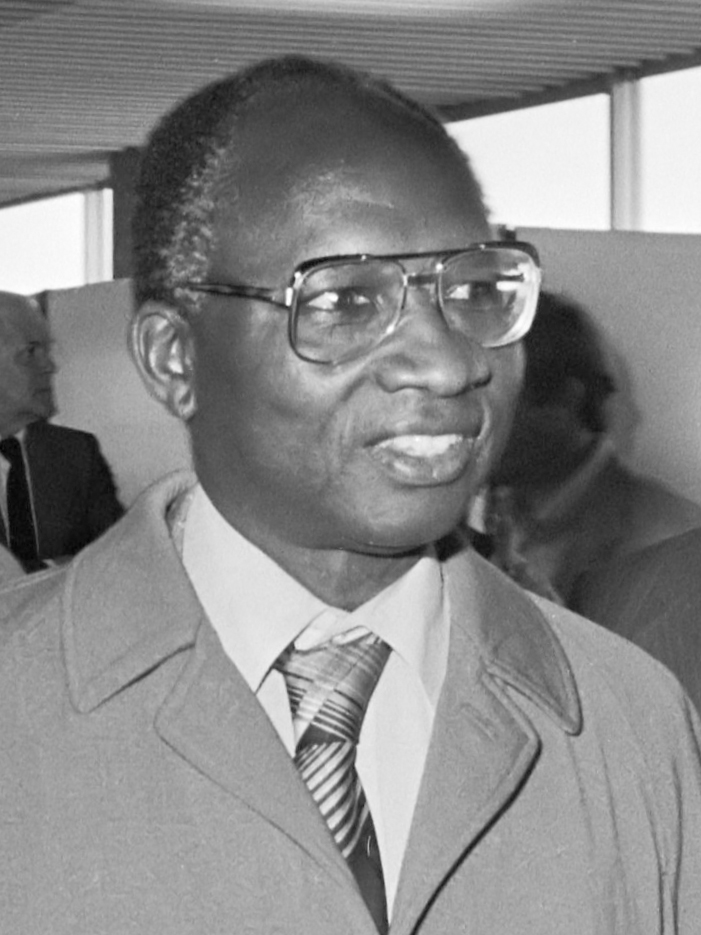
Sir Dawda Jawara
1st President (1970–1994)
Prime Minister (1962–1970)

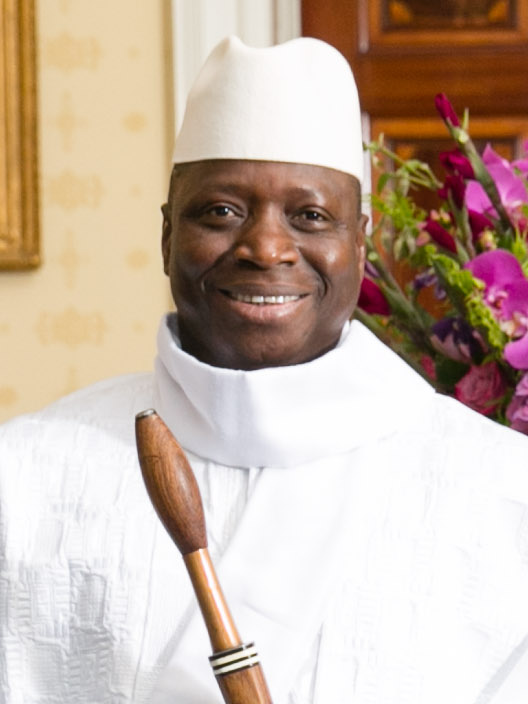
Yahya Jammeh
2nd President (1996–2017)
Chairman of the AFPRC (1994–1996)

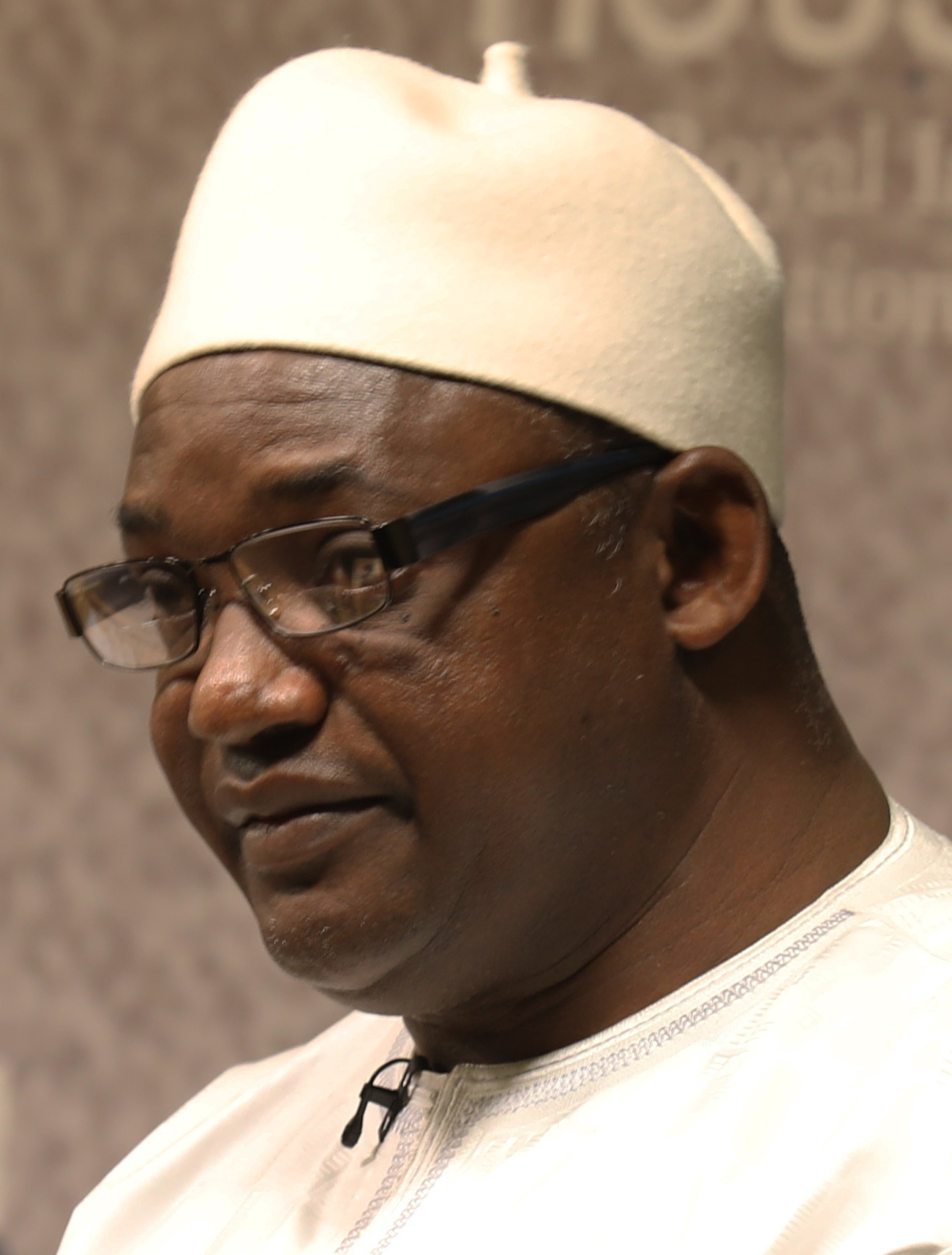
Adama Barrow
3rd President (2017–present)

During the Jawara era, there were initially four political parties, the PPP, the United Party (UP), the Democratic Party (DP), and I.M. Garba-Jahumpa's Muslim Congress Party (MCP). The 1960 constitution had established a House of Representatives, and in the 1960 election no party won a majority of seats. However, in 1961, the British Governor chose UP leader Pierre Sarr N'Jie to serve as the country's first head of government, in the form of a Chief Minister. This was an unpopular decision, and the 1962 election was notable as parties were able to appeal to ethnic and religious differences across the Gambia. The PPP won a majority, and formed a coalition with the Democratic Congress Alliance (DCA; a merger of the DP and MCP). They invited the UP to the coalition in 1963, but it left in 1965.

The UP was seen as the main opposition party, but it lost power from 1965 to 1970. In 1975, the National Convention Party (NCP) was formed by Sheriff Mustapha Dibba, and became the new main opposition party to the PPP's dominance. Both the PPP and NCP were ideologically similar, so in the 1980s a new opposition party emerged, in the form of the radical socialist People's Democratic Organisation for Independence and Socialism (PDOIS). However, between the 1966 and 1992 elections, the PPP was "overwhelmingly dominant", winning between 55% and 70% of the vote in each election and a large majority of seats continually.

In principle, competitive politics existed during the Jawara era, however, it was stated that there was in reality a "one-party monopoly of state power centred around the dominant personality of Sir Dawda Jawara". Civil society was limited post-independence, and opposition parties were weak and at the risk of being declared subversive. The opposition did not have equal access to resources, as the business class refused to finance them. The government had control over when they could make public announcements and press briefings, and there were also allegations of vote-buying and improprieties in the preparation of the electoral register. A 1991 court challenge by the PDOIS against irregularities on the electoral register in Banjul was dismissed on a technicality.

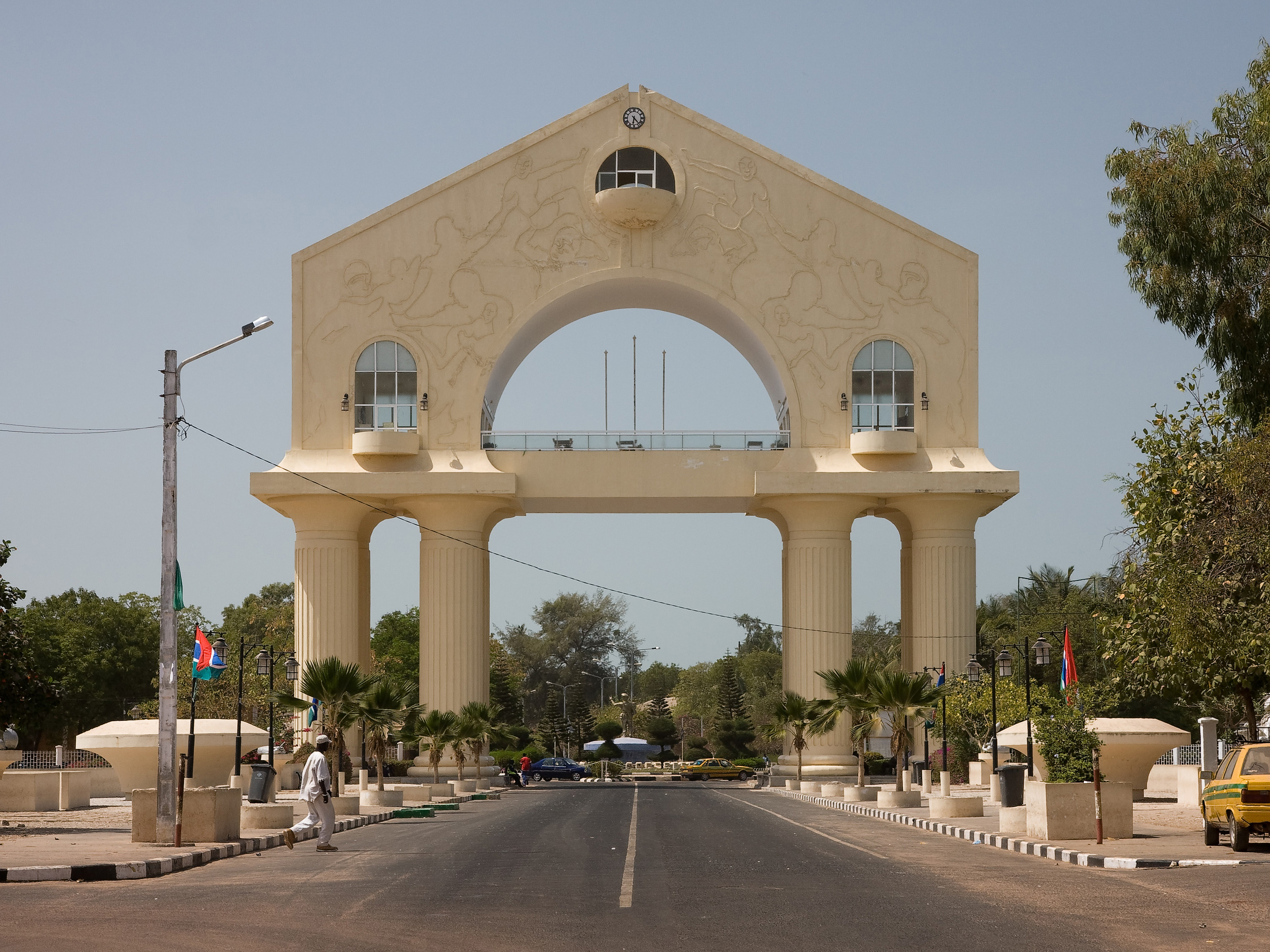
The Arch 22 monument commemorating the 1994 coup which saw the then 29-year-old Yahya Jammeh seize power in a bloodless coup, ousting Sir Dawda Jawara, who had been President of the Gambia since 1970

In July 1994, a bloodless military coup d'état brought an end to the Jawara era. The Armed Forces Provisional Ruling Council (AFPRC), led by Yahya Jammeh, ruled dictatorially for two years. The council suspended the constitution, banned all political parties, and imposed a dusk-to-dawn curfew on the populace. A transition back to democracy occurred in 1996, and a new constitution was written, though the process was manipulated to benefit Jammeh. In a 1996 referendum, 70% of voters approved the constitution, and in December 1996, Jammeh was elected as president. All but PDOIS of the pre-coup parties were banned, and former ministers were barred from public office.

During Jammeh's rule, the opposition was again fragmented. An example was the infighting between members of the National Alliance for Democracy and Development (NADD) that was formed in 2005. Jammeh used the police forces to harass opposition members and parties. Jammeh was also accused of human rights abuses, especially towards human rights activists, civil society organisations, political opponents, and the media. They faced exile, harassment, arbitrary imprisonment, murder, and forced disappearance. Particular examples include the murder of journalist Deyda Hydara in 2004, a student massacre at a protest in 2000, public threats to kill human rights defenders in 2009, and public threats towards homosexuals in 2013. Furthermore, Jammeh made threats to the religious freedom of non-Muslims, used 'mercenary judges' to weaken the judiciary, and faced numerous accusations of election rigging.

In the December 2016 presidential election, Jammeh was beaten by Adama Barrow, who was backed by a coalition of opposition parties. Jammeh's initial agreement to step down followed by a change of mind induced a constitutional crisis that culminated in a military intervention by ECOWAS forces in January 2017. Barrow pledged to serve at the head of a three-year transitional government. The Nigerian Centre for Democracy and Development describe the challenges facing Barrow as needing to restore "citizen's trust and confidence in the public sector". They describe a "fragile peace" with tensions in rural areas between farmers and the larger communities. They also reported on tensions between ethnic groups developing. An example is that in February 2017, 51 supporters of Jammeh were arrested for harassing supporters of Barrow. Although his election was initially met with enthusiasm, the Centre notes that this has been dampened by Barrow's initial constitutional faux pas with his vice president, the challenge of inclusion, and high expectations post-Jammeh.

On 5 December 2021, Incumbent President Adama Barrow was declared the winner of the Gambia's presidential election by the electoral commission. The 4 December 2021 election, the first since former dictator Yahya Jammeh fled into exile, was seen as crucial for the young democracy.

=== Constitution ===
The Gambia has had a number of constitutions in its history. The two most significant are the 1970 constitution, which established the Gambia as a presidential republic, and the 1996 constitution, which served as a basis for Jammeh's rule and was kept following Barrow's victory in 2016. Jammeh manipulated the 1996 constitutional reform process to benefit himself. No reference was made to term limits, indicating Jammeh's preference to stay in power for an extended period of time. According to the 1996 constitution, the President is the head of state, head of government, and commander-in-chief of the armed forces. Jammeh and Barrow have also both taken on the role of Minister of Defence.

=== Presidency ===
The president appoints the vice president and cabinet of ministers and also chairs the cabinet. The office of Prime Minister was abolished in 1970. Total executive power is vested in the president. He can also appoint five members of the National Assembly, the judges of the superior courts, regional governors, and district chiefs. In terms of the civil service, he can appoint the Public Service Commission, the ombudsman, and the Independent Electoral Commission. The president is directly elected for five-year terms based on a simple majority of votes. There are no term limits. The Constitution is under review as of 2018 and a two-term limit and other changes required to enhance the governance structures are expected.

=== Foreign relations ===
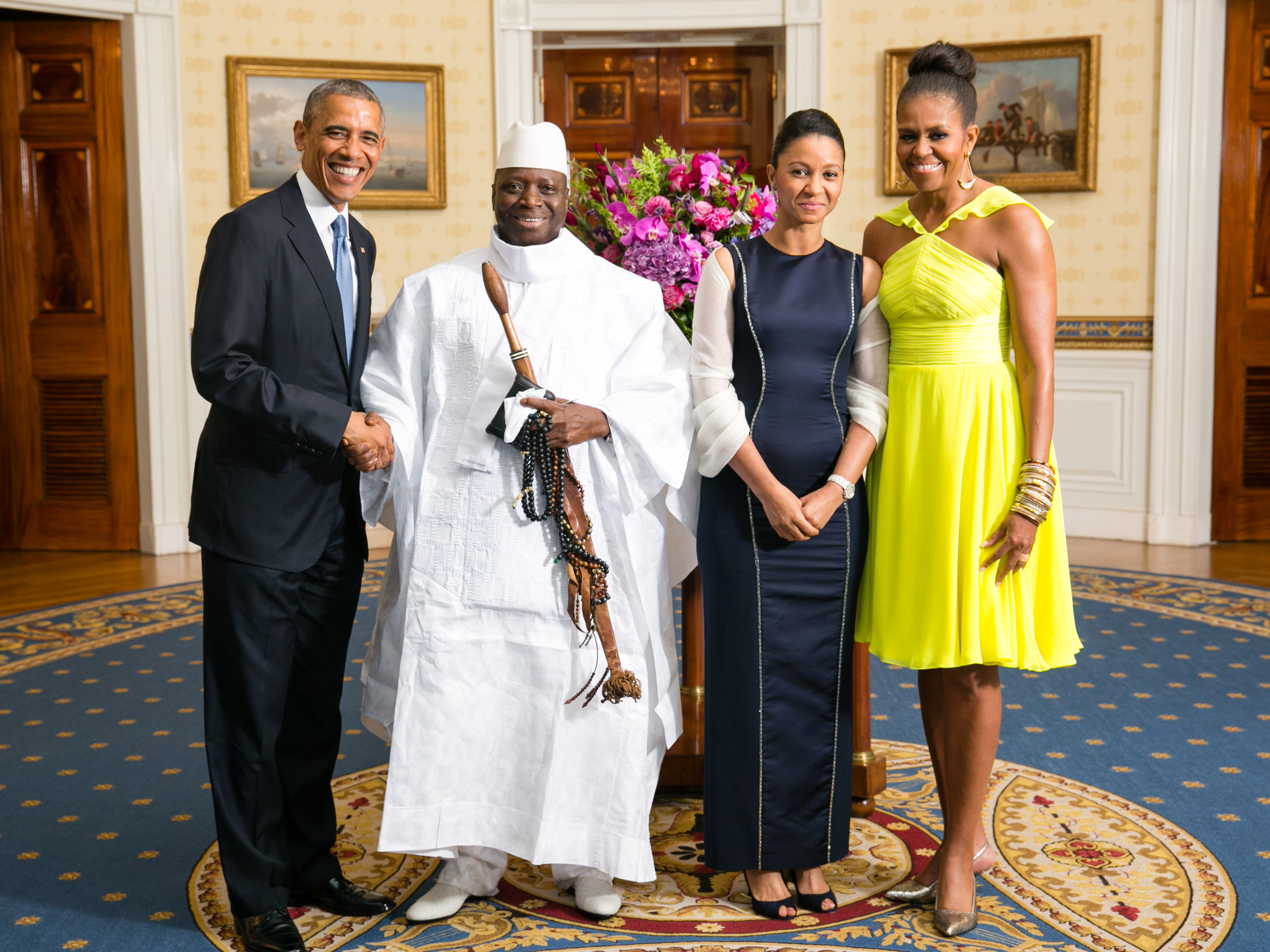
Yahya Jammeh and Mrs. Zeinab Jammeh with Barack and Michelle Obama in the White House, August 2014

The Gambia followed a formal policy of non-alignment throughout most of former President Jawara's tenure. It maintained close relations with the United Kingdom and with Senegal and other African countries. The July 1994 coup strained the Gambia's relationship with Western powers, particularly the United States, which until 2002 suspended most non-humanitarian assistance in accordance with Section 508 of the Foreign Assistance Act. After 1995, President Jammeh established diplomatic relations with several additional countries, including Libya (suspended in 2010), and Cuba. The People's Republic of China cut ties with the Gambia in 1995 – after the latter established diplomatic links with Taiwan – and re-established them in 2016.

As a member of the Economic Community of West African States (ECOWAS), the Gambia has played an active role in that organisation's efforts to resolve the civil wars in Liberia and Sierra Leone and contributed troops to the community's ceasefire monitoring group (ECOMOG) in 1990 and (ECOMIL) in 2003. In November 2019, the Gambia filed a case against Myanmar in The Hague, accusing its military of genocide against Myanmar's ethnic Rohingya community.

Under Yahya Jammeh, the Gambia was also backing up rebels of MFDC in Casamance in southern Senegal. The subsequent worsening of the human rights situation placed increasing strains on US–Gambian relations.

The Gambia withdrew from the Commonwealth of Nations on 3 October 2013, with Jammeh's government stating it had "decided that The Gambia will never be a member of any neo-colonial institution and will never be a party to any institution that represents an extension of colonialism". Under the Barrow government, the Gambia began the process of returning to its status as a republic in the Commonwealth of Nations with the support of the British government, formally presenting its application to re-join the Commonwealth to Secretary-General Patricia Scotland on 22 January 2018, returning to its status as a republic in the Commonwealth of Nations on 8 February 2018.

==== List of international organisation memberships ====
- Commonwealth of Nations
- Economic Community of West African States (ECOWAS)
- United Nations
- African Union
- Organisation of Islamic Cooperation

=== Military ===
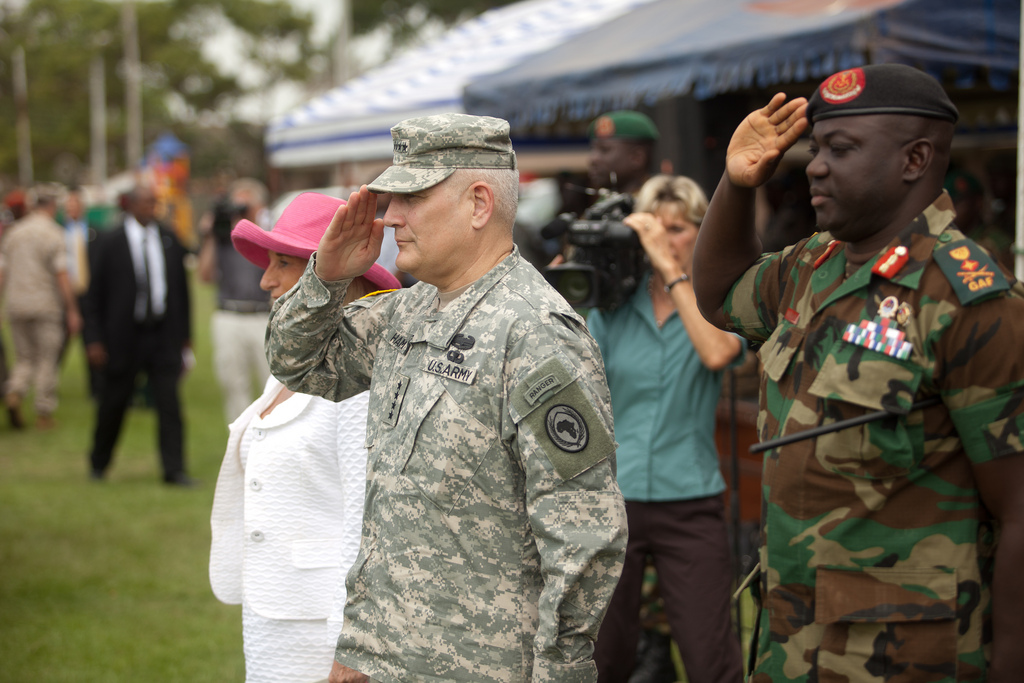
U.S. AFRICOM commander Carter Ham and senior Gambian Army officer Masaneh Kinteh surveying the troops, 21 July 2011

The Gambia Armed Forces (GAF) was created in 1985 as a stipulation of the Senegambia Confederation, a political union between the Gambia and Senegal. It originally consisted of the Gambia National Army (GNA), trained by the British, and Gambia National Gendarmerie (GNG), trained by the Senegalese. The GNG was merged into the police in 1992, and in 1997 Jammeh created a Gambian Navy (GN). Attempts to create a Gambian Air Force in the mid-2000s ultimately fell through. In 2008, Jammeh created a National Republican Guard, composed of special forces units. The GNA has a strength of roughly 900, in two infantry battalions and an engineering company. It makes use of Ferret and M8 Greyhound armoured cars. The GN is equipped with patrol vessels, and Taiwan donated a number of new vessels to the force in 2013.

Since the GAF was formed in 1985, it has been active in UN and African Union peacekeeping missions. It has been classed as a Tier 2 peacekeeping contributor and was described by the Center on International Cooperation as a regional leader in peacekeeping.

It dispatched soldiers to Liberia as part of ECOMOG from 1990 to 1991, during which two Gambian soldiers were killed. It has since contributed troops to ECOMIL, UNMIL, and UNAMID. Responsibility for the military has rested directly with the President since Jammeh seized power at the head of a bloodless military coup in 1994. Jammeh also created the role of Chief of the Defence Staff, who is the senior military officer responsible for the day-to-day operations of the Gambia Armed Forces. Between 1958 and 1985, the Gambia did not have a military, but the Gambia Field Force existed as a paramilitary wing of the police. The military tradition of the Gambia can be traced to the Gambia Regiment of the British Army, that existed from 1901 to 1958 and fought in World War I and World War II. In 2017, Gambia signed the UN treaty on the Prohibition of Nuclear Weapons.

The Gambia Armed Forces is and has been the recipient of a number of equipment and training agreements with other countries. In 1992, a contingent of Nigerian soldiers helped lead the GNA. Between 1991 and 2005, the Turkish armed forces helped train Gambian soldiers. It has also hosted British and United States training teams from the Royal Gibraltar Regiment and US AFRICOM.

Gambia is the 82nd most peaceful country in the world, according to the 2024 Global Peace Index.

=== Human rights ===
According to the World Health Organization, an estimated 78.3% of Gambian girls and women have suffered female genital mutilation.

LGBT activity is illegal, and punishable with life imprisonment, although the Barrow administration promised not to prosecute consenting same sex couples, it has also said it will not repeal the law.

The Daily Observer reporter Ebrima Manneh is believed by human rights organisations to have been arrested in July 2006 and secretly held in custody since then. Manneh was reportedly arrested by Gambia's National Intelligence Agency after attempting to republish a BBC report criticizing President Yahya Jammeh. Amnesty International considers him to be a prisoner of conscience and named him a 2011 "priority case". In 2019 the Gambian newspaper The Trumpet reported that Manneh had died in captivity at some point in mid-2008.

=== Administrative divisions ===
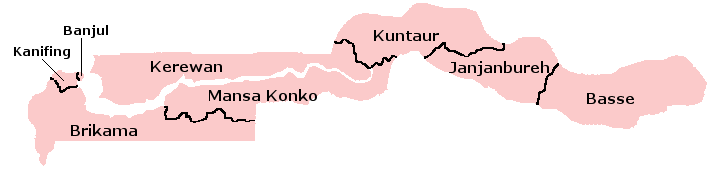
Local government areas of the Gambia

The Gambia is divided into eight local government areas, including the national capital, Banjul, which is classified as a city. The divisions of the Gambia were created by the Independent Electoral Commission in accordance to Article 192 of the National Constitution. As a unitary state, laws from the capital city are made for the entire country but local governmental authorities are allowed to make by-laws as part of an effort to decentralise the country since around the late 80's to early 90's. It is done through A National Policy for Decentralization and Local Development program which consists of phase 1 between 2015–2019 and phase 2 through 2020–2024.

Administrative divisions
Name	Area (km^{2})	Population census			Capital	Number of districts
Name	Area (km^{2})	2003	2013	2024 (provisional)	Capital	Number of districts
Banjul (capital city)	12.2	35,061	31,054	26,461	Banjul	3
Kanifing	75.6	322,735	377,134	379,348	Kanifing	1
Brikama (formerly Western)	1,764.3	389,594	688,744	1,151,128	Brikama	9
Mansa Konko (formerly Lower River)	1,628.0	72,167	81,042	90,624	Mansakonko	6
Kerewan (formerly North Bank)	2,255.5	172,835	220,080	248,475	Kerewan	7
Kuntaur (formerly the western half of Central River Division)	1,466.5	78,491	96,703	118,104	Kuntaur	5
Janjanbureh (formerly the eastern half of Central River Division)	1,427.8	107,212	125,204	147,412	Janjanbureh	5
Basse (formerly Upper River)	2,069.5	182,586	237,220	261,160	Basse Santa Su	7
Total Gambia	10,689	1,360,681	1,857,181	2,422,712	Banjul	43

The local government areas are further subdivided (2013) into 43 districts. Of these, Kanifing and Kombo Saint Mary (which shares Brikama as a capital with the Brikama Local Government Area) are effectively part of the Greater Banjul area.

== Economy ==
GDP per capita development in Senegal and Gambia, 1950–2018

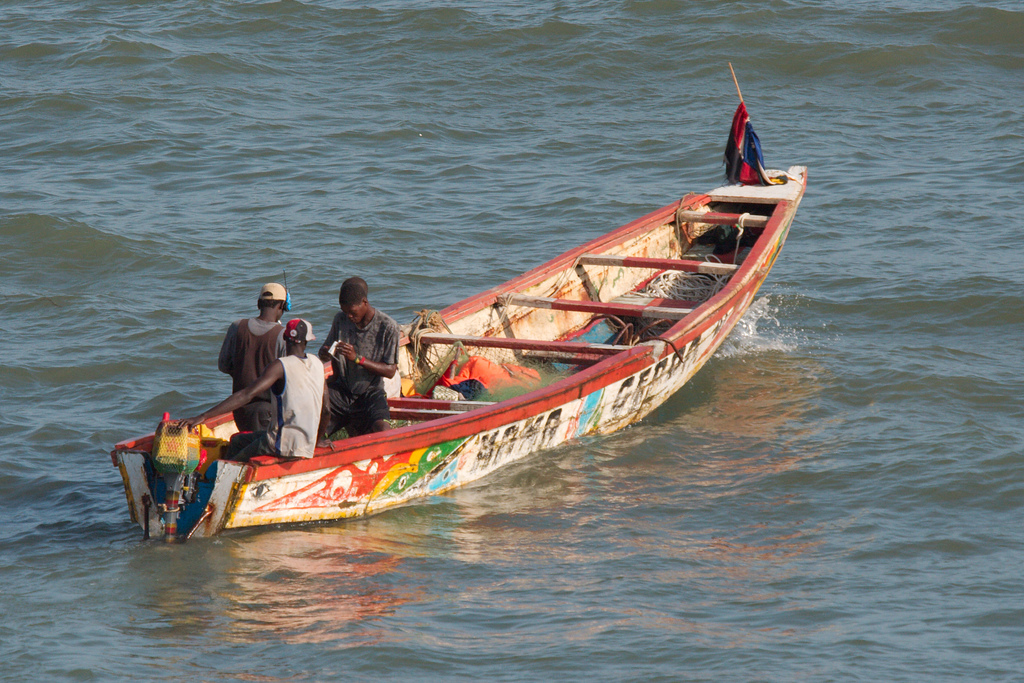
Brightly painted fishing boats are common in Bakau

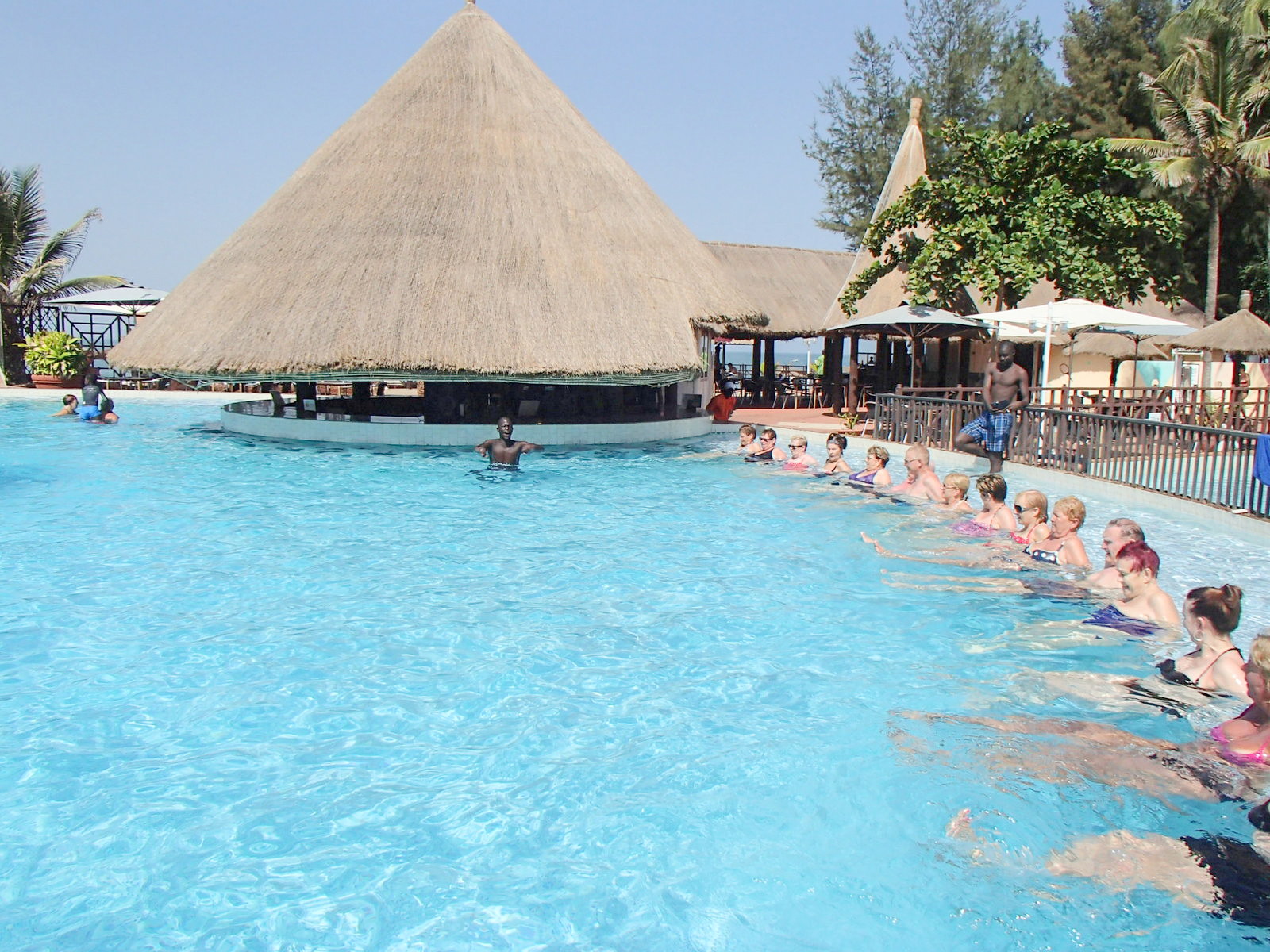
Tourists in The Gambia, 2014

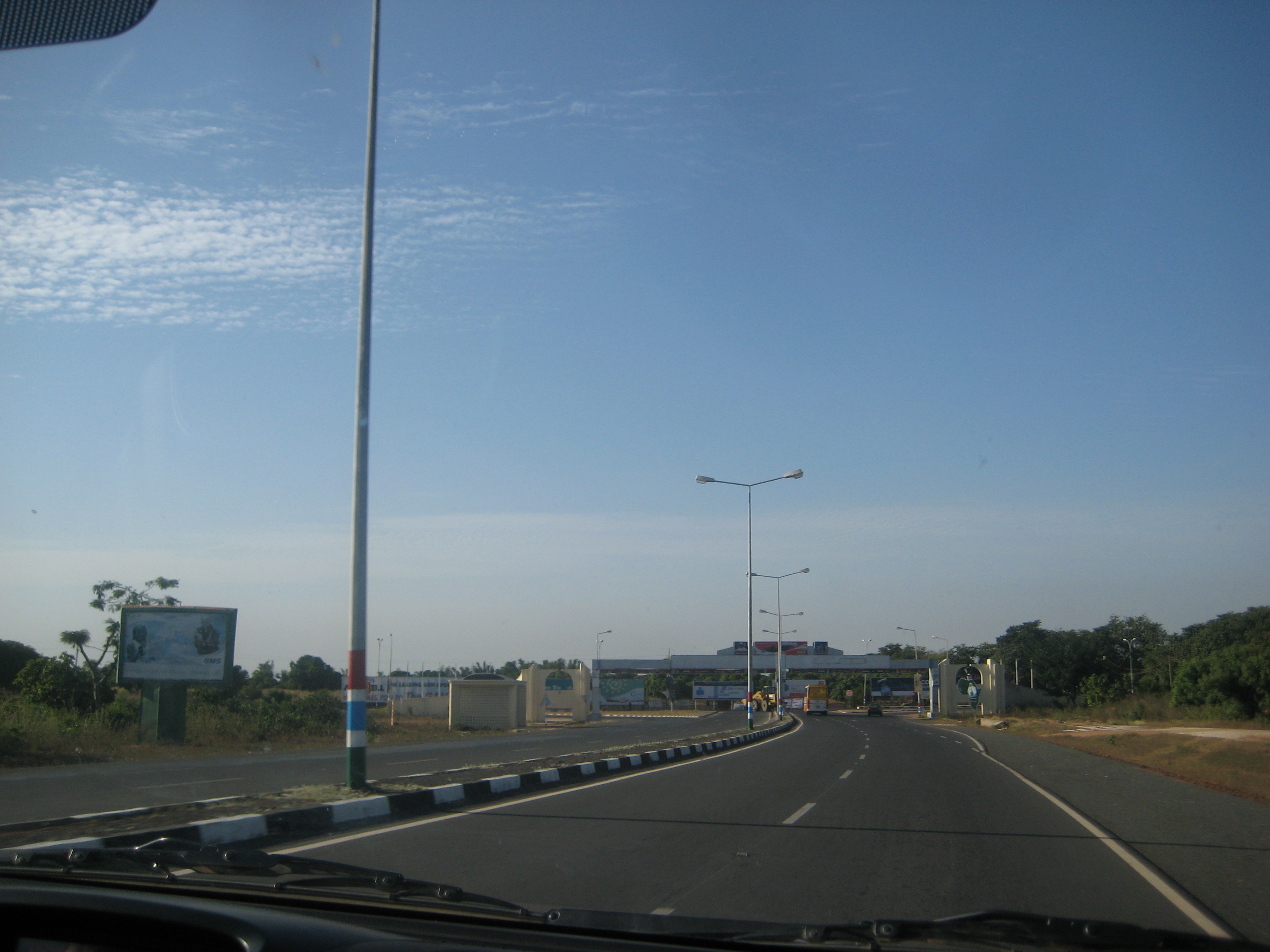
A road in Gambia, 2007

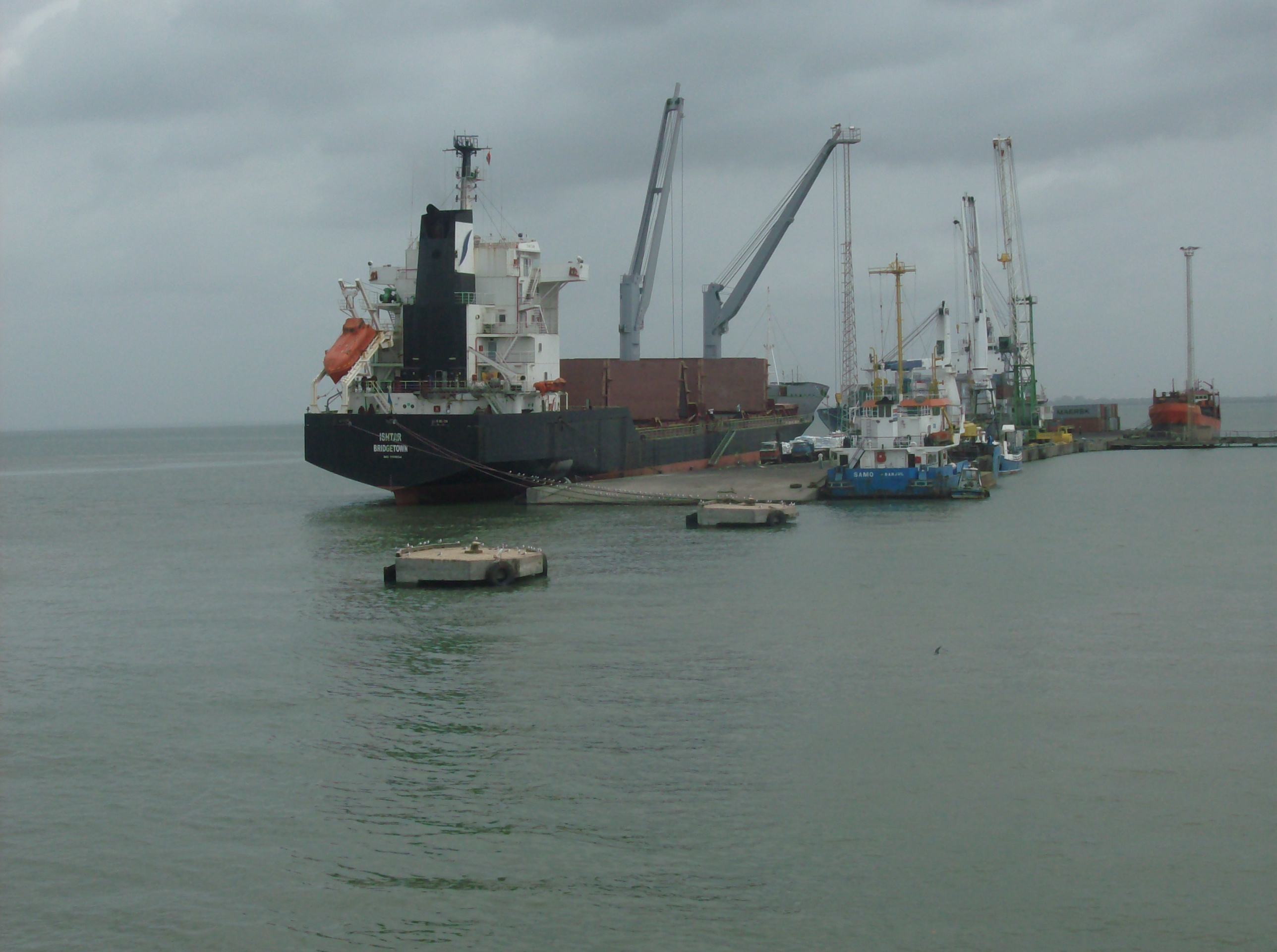
The Banjul ferry and Port of Banjul

The Gambia has a liberal, market-based economy characterised by traditional subsistence agriculture, a historic reliance on groundnuts (peanuts) for export earnings, a re-export trade built up around its ocean port, low import duties, minimal administrative procedures, a fluctuating exchange rate with no exchange controls, and a significant tourism industry.

The World Bank pegged Gambian gross domestic product (GDP) for 2018 at US$1,624 million; the International Monetary Fund put it at US$977 million for 2011. From 2006 to 2012, the Gambian economy grew annually at a rate of 5–6% of GDP.

Agriculture accounts for roughly 30% of GDP and employs about 70% of the labour force. Within agriculture, peanut production accounts for 6.9% of GDP, other crops 8.3%, livestock 5.3%, fishing 1.8%, and forestry 0.5%. Industry accounts for about 8% of GDP and services around 58%. The limited amount of manufacturing is primarily agricultural-based (e.g., peanut processing, bakeries, a brewery, and a tannery). Other manufacturing activities involve soap, soft drinks, and clothing.

Previously, the United Kingdom and the European Union constituted the major Gambian export markets. However, in recent years Senegal, the United States, and Japan have become significant trade partners of the Gambia. In Africa, Senegal represented the biggest trade partner of the Gambia in 2007, which is a defining contrast to previous years that had Guinea-Bissau and Ghana as equally important trade partners. Globally, Denmark, the United States, and China have become important source countries for Gambian imports. The United Kingdom, Germany, Ivory Coast, and the Netherlands also provide a fair share of Gambian imports. The Gambian trade deficit for 2007 was US$331 million.

In May 2009, twelve commercial banks existed in the Gambia, including one Islamic bank. The oldest of these, Standard Chartered Bank, dates its presence back to the entry in 1894 of what shortly thereafter became the Bank of British West Africa. In 2005 the Switzerland-based banking group International Commercial Bank established a subsidiary and now has four branches in the country. In 2007 Nigeria's Access Bank established a subsidiary that now has four branches in the country, in addition to its head office; the bank has pledged to open four more. 2008 saw the incorporation of Zenith Bank (Gambia) Limited, a subsidiary of Nigeria's behemoth Zenith Bank Plc, in the country. In May 2009 the Lebanese Canadian Bank opened a subsidiary called Prime Bank.

Since 2017, China has invested in the Gambia as part of its Belt and Road Initiative. A major focus of Chinese activity in Gambia has been processing of locally caught fish for the production of fish meal for export. The economic and environmental impacts of fish meal production in Gambia are controversial.

In 2024, the first solar power plant was inaugurated.

=== Transportation ===
The system of transportation in the Gambia mixes both public and private operations and consists of a system of roads (both paved and unpaved), water and air transportation. The Trans-Gambia Highway runs along both sides of the river Gambia, which bisects the country. The river may be crossed by ferry or the Senegambia bridge. There are no railways in the country.

Roadways in the country run to a length of 3,742 km of which only 723 km is paved and the remaining 3,019 km remains unpaved.

The country has a total of 390 km of waterways, with the Port of Banjul being the only port, which is managed by the Gambia Ports Authority.

The country's only international airport is the Banjul International Airport at Yundum, 26 km outside the capital.

== Demographics ==
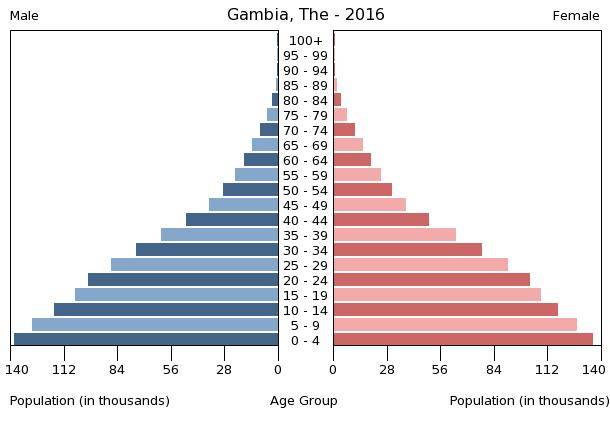
Population pyramid

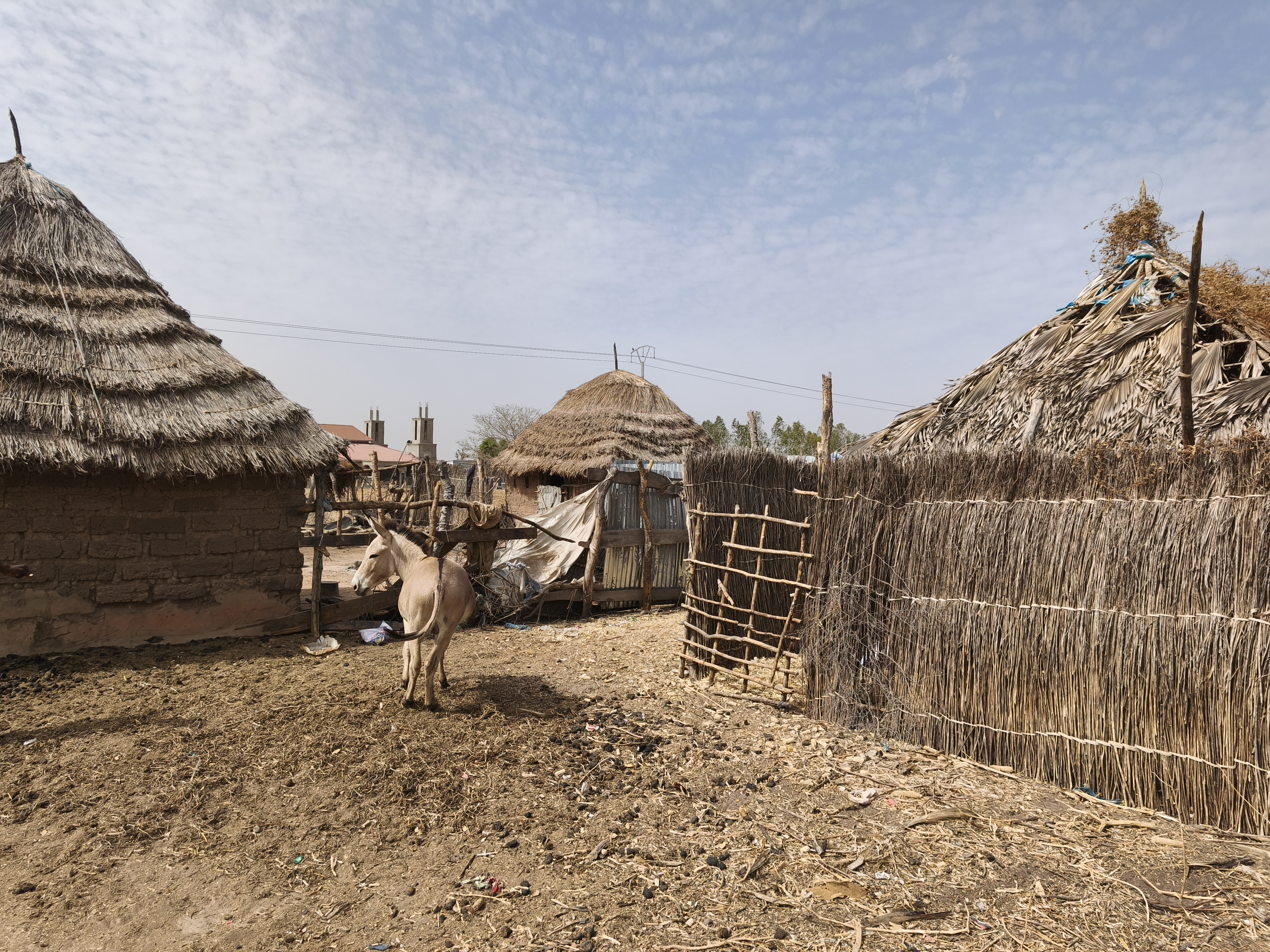
Gambian village

Population in The Gambia
Year	Million
1950	0.27
2000	1.2
2021	2.6

The urbanisation rate as of 2011 was 57.3%. Provisional figures from the 2003 census show the gap between the urban and rural populations narrowing as more areas are declared urban. While urban migration, development projects, and modernisation are bringing more Gambians into contact with Western habits and values, indigenous forms of dress and celebration and the traditional emphasis on the extended family remain integral parts of everyday life.

The United Nations Development Programme (UNDP) Human Development Report for 2010 ranks The Gambia 151st out of 169 countries on its Human Development Index, putting the country in the "Low Human Development" category. This index compares life-expectancy, years of schooling, gross national income (GNI) per capita and other factors.

The total fertility rate (TFR) was estimated at 3.98 children per woman in 2013.

=== Ethnic groups ===
Ethnic Groups in the Gambia
Ethnic Groups	percent
Mandinka	34%
Fula	25%
Wolof	11%
Jola	9%
Sarahule	7%
Serere	3%
Mangajo	2%
Bambara	1%
Aku	.5%
Other	1.5%

A variety of ethnic groups live in the Gambia, each preserving its own language and traditions. The Mandinka ethnicity is the most numerous, followed by the Fula, Wolof, Jola/Karoninka, Serahule, Serers, Manjago, Bambara, Aku Marabou, Bainunka and others, such as Tukulor. The Krio people, locally known as Akus, constitute one of the smallest ethnic minorities in the Gambia. They descend from Sierra Leone Creole people and have traditionally concentrated in the capital.

The roughly 3,500 non-African residents include Europeans and families of Lebanese origin (0.23% of the total population). Most of the European minority is British, although many of the British left after independence.

=== Languages ===
English is the official language of the Gambia and is thus used for official purposes and education. Other languages include Mandinka, Wolof, Fula, Serer, Soninke, Krio, Jola and other indigenous vernaculars. Owing to the country's geographical setting, knowledge of French (an official language in much of West Africa) is relatively widespread.

Mandinka is spoken as a first language by 38% of the population, Pulaar by 21%, Wolof by 18%, Soninke by 9%, Jola by 4.5%, Serer by 2.4%, Manjak and Bainouk by 1.6% each, Guinean Creole by 1%, and English by 0.5%. Several other languages are spoken by smaller numbers. Gambian Sign Language is used by the deaf.

=== Education ===
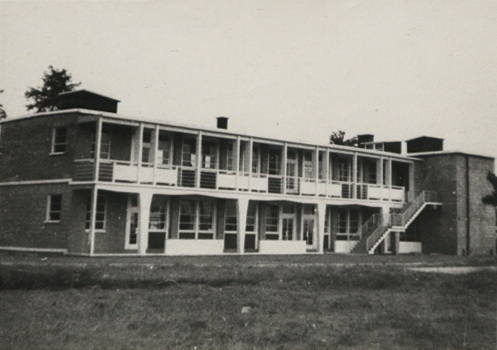
1969 photo lableled "Science Dept. Gambia High School" in Banjul, which was then called Bathurst

The constitution mandates free and compulsory primary education in the Gambia. Lack of resources and of educational infrastructure has made implementation of this difficult. In 1995 the gross primary enrolment rate was 77.1% and the net primary enrolment rate was 64.7% School fees long prevented many children from attending school, but in February 1998 President Jammeh ordered the termination of fees for the first six years of schooling. Girls make up about 52% of primary-school pupils. The figure may be lower for girls in rural areas, where cultural factors and poverty prevent parents from sending girls to school. Approximately 20% of school-age children attend Quranic schools.

==== Higher education ====
There are various public and private tertiary educational institutions in the Gambia. The Gambia College, one of the oldest post-secondary education, was established in 1978. It offers certificate and diploma programmes in public health, education, nursing, and agriculture. The University of the Gambia was established by the Act of the National Assembly of the Gambia in 1999. Since its establishment the UTG offers both undergraduate, post-graduate and PhD in different faculties. The university used to be housed at the MDI in Kanifing and the Gambia College in Brikama. The new campus in Faraba was inaugurated on 12 March 2024.

The International Open University (until January 2020 known as the Islamic Online University), a higher-education institution having more than 435,000 enrolled students from over 250 countries worldwide, has its global headquarters in the Gambia.

=== Health ===
In the 2024 Global Hunger Index (GHI), the Gambia ranks 88th out of 127 countries, with a score of 19.9. This score indicates a moderate level of hunger.

With an estimated population of about 2.8 million and around 30% of the Gambia’s population lives below the international poverty line of US$1.25 per day, with only 1.52% of its GDP on health in 2022 (WHO recommended budget for health is 5% of the GDP) The Gambia has made significant strides in the health of its people though it is still lagging in certain health targets with new emerging threats rising. The life expectancy at birth of the general population has improved from 31.2 years in 1950, to 65.9 years 2023 (average life expectancy in the world was 73.3 years in 2023) with average life expectancy as of 2023 being 64.2 years in men, and 67.5 years in women. This has been largely attributed to improvement in healthcare delivery, disease prevention and healthcare promotion programs.

The Human Rights Measurement Initiative finds that Gambia is fulfilling 63.7% of what it should be fulfilling for the right to health based on its level of income. When looking at the right to health with respect to children, Gambia achieves 93.9% of what is expected based on its current income. In regards to the right to health amongst the adult population, the country achieves only 83.4% of what is expected based on the nation's level of income. Gambia falls into the "very bad" category when evaluating the right to reproductive health because the nation is fulfilling only 13.8% of what the nation is expected to achieve based on the resources (income) it has available.

=== Religion ===
Religions in the Gambia
Religions	Percent
Islam	96.4%
Christianity	3.5%
Other	0.1%

Approximately 96% of the population identify as Sunni Muslim, mostly Malikite Sufi. Except for a tiny fraction of one percent, the remainder of the population are Christian. Article 25 of the Constitution protects the rights of citizens to practice any religion that they choose and intermarriage between Muslims and Christians is common.

==== Islam ====
Virtually all commercial life in the Gambia comes to a standstill during major Muslim holidays, which include Eid al-Adha and Eid ul-Fitr. Sunni Muslims in the Gambia mainly follow the Maliki school of jurisprudence. There is also a significant presence of the Ahmadiyya movement in the country. A Shia Muslim minority exists in the Gambia, mainly due to Lebanese and other Arab immigrants to the region. The vast majority of South-Asian immigrants are also Muslims.

==== Christianity ====
The Christian community comprises about 4% of the population. Residing in the western and southern parts of the Gambia, most members of the Christian community identify themselves as Roman Catholic. However, smaller Christian denominations are also present, including Anglicans, Methodists, Baptists, Seventh-day Adventists, Jehovah's Witnesses, and small evangelical congregations.

==== Traditional religions ====
It is unclear to what extent indigenous beliefs, such as the Serer religion, continue to be practised. Serer religion encompasses cosmology and a belief in a supreme deity called Roog. Some of its religious festivals include the Xooy, Mbosseh, and Randou Rande. Each year, adherents of Serer religion make the annual pilgrimage to Sine in Senegal for the Xooy divination ceremony. Serer religion also has a rather significant imprint on Senegambian Muslim society in that Senegambian Muslim festivals such as "Tobaski", "Gamo", "Koriteh" and "Weri Kor" have names representing loanwords from the Serer religion – they were ancient Serer festivals.

Like the Serers, the Jola people have their own religious customs, including a major religious ceremony, Boukout.

==== Other religions ====
Owing to a small number of immigrants from South Asia, Hindus and followers of the Baháʼí Faith are also present.

==== Judaism ====
A small Jewish community in the Gambia emerged in the 2010s and 2020s, cited to number roughly 40 in 2011. The evangelical Christians converts built a small synagogue in the capital Banjul.

== Culture ==
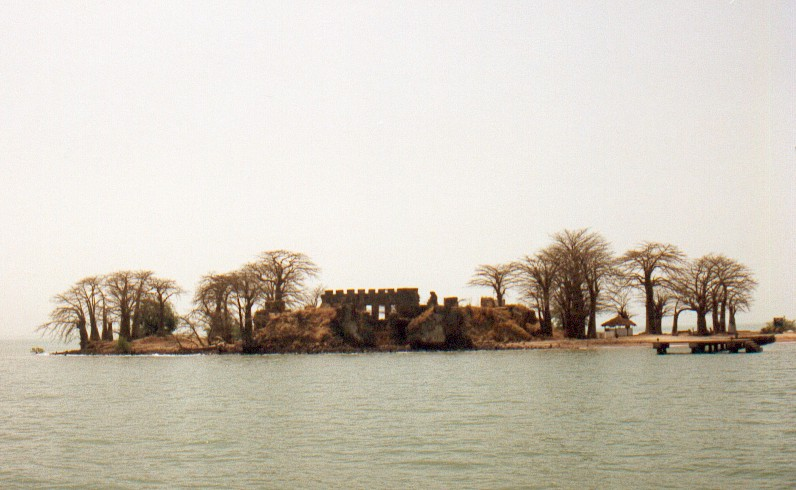
James Island near Juffureh

Although the Gambia is the smallest country on mainland Africa, its culture is the product of very diverse influences. The national borders outline a narrow strip on either side of the River Gambia, a body of water that has played a vital part in the nation's destiny and is known locally simply as "the River". Without natural barriers, the Gambia has become home to most of the ethnic groups that are present throughout western Africa, especially those in Senegal.

Europeans also figure prominently in Gambian history because the River Gambia is navigable deep into the continent, a geographic feature that made this area one of the most profitable sites for the slave trade from the 15th through the 17th centuries. (It also made it strategic to the halt of this trade once it was outlawed in the 19th century.) Some of this history was popularised in the Alex Haley book and TV series Roots, which was set in the Gambia.

=== Music ===
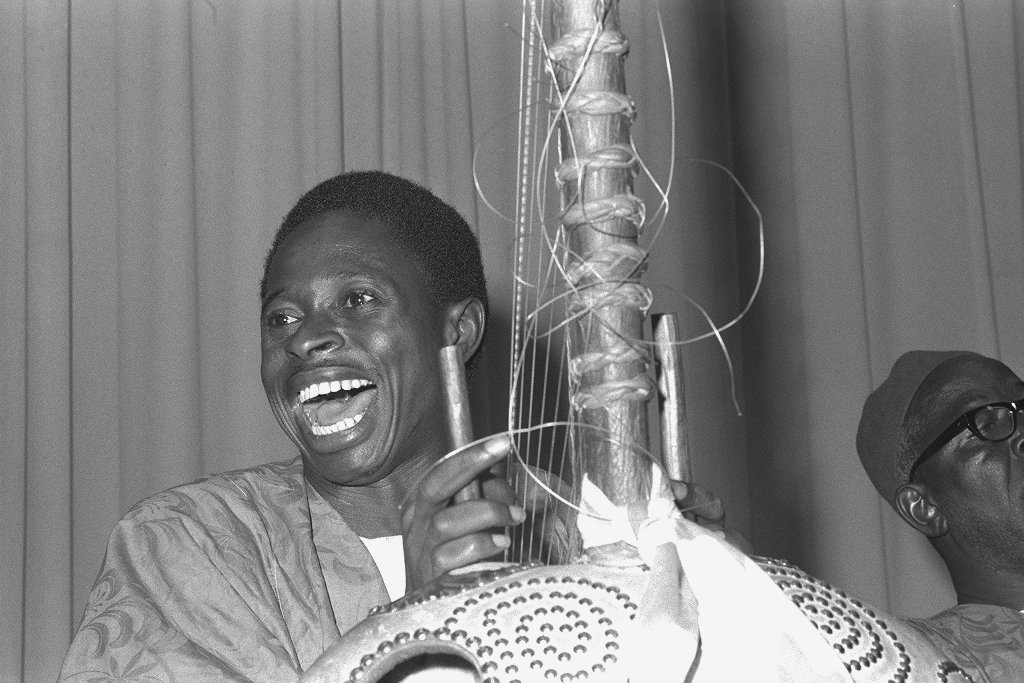
Musicians from Gambia, West Africa gave a free public concert in the Carmichael Auditorium, National Museum of History and Technology, now the National Museum of American History, in June 1977. The musicians performed on the koru, hallam, and balafon.

The music of the Gambia is closely linked musically with that of its neighbour, Senegal, which surrounds its inland frontiers completely. It fuses popular Western music and dance, with sabar, the traditional drumming and dance music of the Wolof and Serer people of Senegal.

=== Cuisine ===
The cuisine of the Gambia is heavily influenced by the culinary traditions of neighbouring Senegal, reflecting a mix of local ingredients and historical influences, including French colonial cuisine. A popular dish in particular is the Gambian domoda, a savoury peanut stew made with meat, peanut paste, and vegetables, which is the national dish of the Gambia. Another dish is Gambian okra stew (superkanja) which in addition to okra, has palm oil, meat and smoked fish. Senegalese yassa is also enjoyed widely; it features marinated fish or chicken seasoned with lemon, onions, and mustard, providing a sharp flavour that contrasts with the earthiness of many other dishes. Gambian cuisine usually includes peanuts, rice, fish, meat, onions, tomatoes, cassava, sweet potatoes, egg plant, cabbage, chili peppers and oysters from the River Gambia.

=== Literature ===
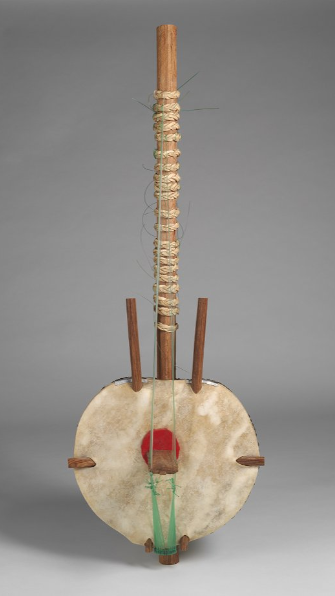
The kora is played by traditional storytellers of the Gambia River valley. These storytellers, called griots, recite stories and histories.

As with other West African countries, the Gambia has a tradition of oral literature, including the griots, traditional storytellers and musicians. Since the 1960s, an English-language Gambian literature has emerged. Lenrie Peters is considered the founding father of this literature, whilst notable writers include Tijan Sallah, Nana Grey-Johnson and Mariama Khan.

=== Media ===
The government under Yahya Jammeh's rule was hostile to privately-owned media organizations and independent journalists in the Gambia. Licensing fees were high for newspapers and radio stations, and the only nationwide stations were tightly controlled by the government.

A 2002 law created a commission with the power to issue licences and imprison journalists; in 2004, additional legislation allowed prison sentences for libel and slander and cancelled all print and broadcasting licenses, forcing media groups to re-register at five times the original cost. Two days after the 2004 legislation was passed, a co-founder and editor of the newspaper The Point, Deyda Hydara, was shot to death. Reporters Without Borders found in an initial investigation that "most of the key witnesses were convinced of the government's involvement" in Hydara's murder.

In 2010, Musa Saidykhan, former editor of The Independent newspaper, was awarded US$200,000 by the ECOWAS Court in Abuja, Nigeria. The court found the government of the Gambia guilty of torture while he was detained without trial.

=== Sports ===
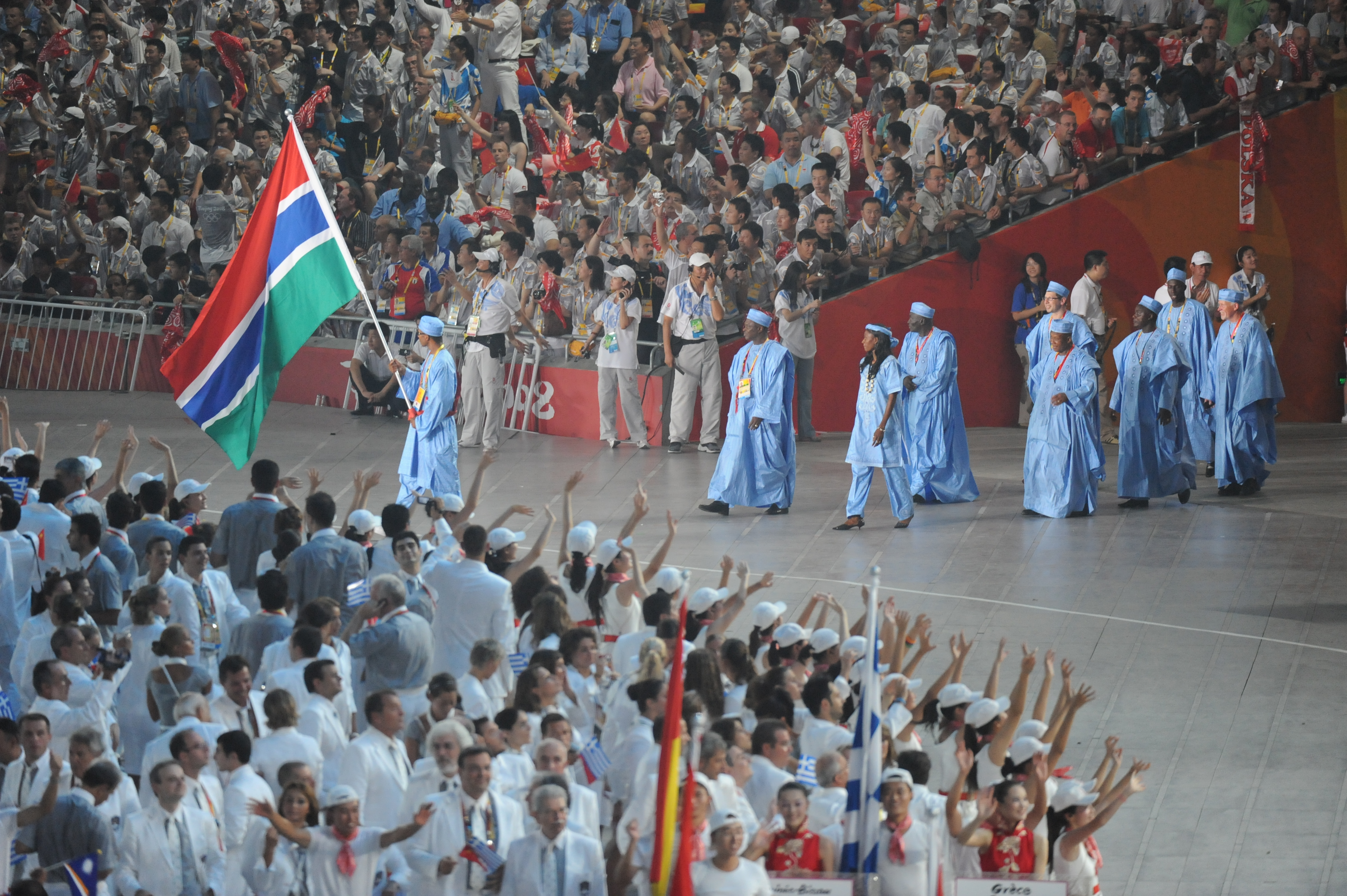
The Gambia at the 2008 Summer Olympics – Opening Ceremony – Beijing, China

As in neighbouring Senegal, the national and most popular sport in the Gambia is wrestling. Association football and basketball are also popular. Football in the Gambia is administered by the Gambia Football Federation, who are affiliated to both FIFA and CAF. The GFA runs league football in the Gambia, including top division GFA League First Division, as well as the Gambia national football team. Nicknamed "The Scorpions", the national side have never qualified for the FIFA World Cup, but qualified for the Africa Cup of Nations at senior level for the first time in 2021. They also qualified for the second time in row in 2023 to participate in the AFCON in Ivory Coast. They play at Independence Stadium. The Gambia won two CAF U-17 championships one in 2005 when the country hosted, and 2009 in Algeria automatically qualifying for FIFA U-17 World Cup in Peru (2005) and Nigeria (2009) respectively. The U-20 also qualified for FIFA U-20 World Cup in 2007 and 2023 in Canada and Argentina respectively. The female U-17 also competed in FIFA U-17 World Cup 2012 in Azerbaijan.

The Gambia featured a national team in beach volleyball that competed at the 2018–2020 CAVB Beach Volleyball Continental Cup in both the women's and the men's section.

== See also ==
- Outline of The Gambia
