= For The Gambia Our Homeland =

National anthem of the Gambia

- National anthem of The Gambia
- Lyrics: Original: Virginia Julia Howe, composed by Jeremy Frederic Howe; English version: Virginia Julia Howe
- Adopted: 1965; 61 years ago

Audio sample
- U.S. Navy Band instrumental version: file; help

"For The Gambia Our Homeland" is the national anthem of The Gambia. National anthem of the Gambia, written by Virginia Julia Howe and composed by Jeremy Frederic Howe, adopted after an international competition before independence in 1965

== History ==
In the lead-up to The Gambia's independence from the United Kingdom on 18 February 1965, a National Anthem Selection Committee was set up to accept submissions for a national anthem for the country. The committee would ultimately receive three submissions. One submission, by Reverend John Colley Faye, although acknowledged as "superb" in content, was rejected for being too long, with the Committee preferring something more to the point and easy to memorise.

Mandinka musician Jali Nyama Suso was approached by the government to compose an entry. He responded that he would base his proposal on a traditional Mandinka tune dedicated to Foday Kabba Dumbuya (or Fodee Kaba Dumbuya), a Muslim reformer and warrior remembered for his conquests for Islam, and a patron of Jali Nyama's grandfather. Jali Nyama stated that basing national anthems on odes to local historical figures had been done in nearby Guinea and Mali. Jali Nyama wrote his own Mandinka lyrics to the tune.

Jali Nyama's proposal was recorded and sent to be heard in the Prime Minister's office in the Cabinet, where it was liked by Prime Minister Dawda Jawara. After it was also well received by Governor-General John Paul, it was sent to be translated into English by Jeremy Frederick Howe, Chairman of the Selection Committee. Howe was a member of the Gambia Colonial Service from 1954 to 1965, an Administrative Officer in the Ministry of Local Government. Howe would ultimately be credited for the composition of the anthem, while his wife, Virginia Julia Howe, a university-trained composer, would be credited for the English translation.

== Lyrics ==
The original lyrics are in English, and translated into Wolof.

English lyrics

For The Gambia, our homeland
We strive and work and pray,
That all may live in unity,
Freedom and peace each day.

Let justice guide our actions
Towards the common good,
And join our diverse peoples (Note: Sometimes written as "people".)
To prove man's brotherhood.

We pledge our firm allegiance,
Our promise we renew;
Keep us, great God of nations,
To The Gambia ever true.

Wolof lyrics

Gambia mede sunyu rewe.
Nyu nge jaim di liggaye de nyan
Ndakh nyun nyep nyu bolloh nek a bena
Am sunyu affier ak jama base bu neka.

Na degga sama sunyu jefye
Nyeal jef yu bakh ye ngu digalleh
Tay bolleh sunyu girr ye
Ndakh wonneh ni dom adama wara nekeh bena.

Nyunge tailleh Sunyu degga deggi nangu
Tei essal sunyu diggeh
Yalla mu maggame omba askanwe
Sahal nyu chi Gambia beh fau.
