= .gm =

Internet country code top-level domain for The Gambia

- Introduced: 28 March 1997
- TLD type: Country code top-level domain
- Status: Active
- Registry: GM-NIC
- Sponsor: Gambia Telecommunications Company
- Intended use: Entities connected with the Gambia
- Actual use: Used primarily, though not frequently, in The Gambia
- Registration restrictions: Company must be registered in The Gambia or have strong ties to it; name must be connected to that of company or organisation requesting it
- Structure: Registrations are directly at second level
- Documents: Policy
- Registry website: nic.gm

.gm is the country code top-level domain (ccTLD) of The Gambia.

== Second-level domains ==
Registrations are taken directly at the second level, or at the third level beneath the following second level names.

A subregistry * .gov.gm for government entities is delegated to the Ministry of Communication, Information & IT (MoICI).

A subregistry * .edu.gm for educational institutions and resources is delegated to the University of The Gambia (UTG).
