= Tourism in the Gambia =

The tourism industry in the Gambia started when a party of 300 Swedish tourists arrived in 1965. That pioneering trip was organised by a Swede named Bertil Harding together with the tour operators Vingresor. It was seen as an ideal place to escape the harsh winter months of Scandinavia where Europeans would enjoy not only sun, sand and beaches but also experience the excitement of a real African holiday. It also offered a new opening for an affordable holiday to increasing numbers of traveling Europeans.

The number of visitors increased from 300 tourists in 1965 to 25,000 visitors in 1976. The number of tourists has continued to rise sharply throughout the years, and as the government is eager to diversify the economy, it recognised tourism as a potential major foreign exchange source of revenue. However, despite increasing popularity as a tourist destination, infrastructure development has been slow.

== Popular areas and attractions ==
=== Banjul ===
Banjul, which is the capital city of the Gambia, is a popular area for tourists. The population of the city is only 34,828, with the Greater Banjul Area, which includes the City of Banjul and the Kanifing Municipal Council, having a population of 357,238 (2003 census). It is located on St Mary's Island (Banjul Island) where the Gambia River enters the Atlantic Ocean. The island is connected to the mainland by passenger and vehicle ferries to the north and bridges to the south. Banjul is located at 13°28' North, 16°36' West (13.4667, -16.60).

=== Jufureh ===
Jufureh, Juffureh, or Juffure is a town in the Gambia that is popular with tourists, lying 30 km inland on the north bank of the River Gambia in the North Bank Division. It is said to be where Alex Haley's novel Roots: The Saga of an American Family is set. It is home to a museum and lies near James Island. A family claiming to be the descendants of Kunta Kinte still resides here.

=== Kachikally crocodile pool ===
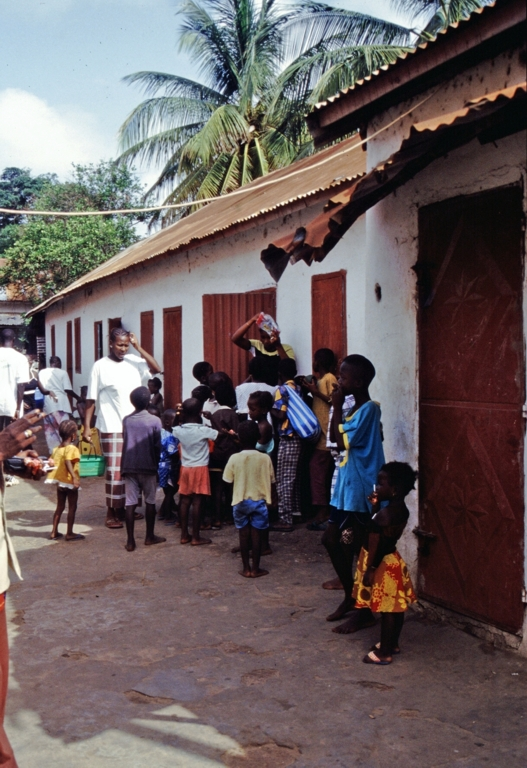
Bakau

The Kachikally crocodile pool is located in the heart of Bakau about 10 miles (16 km) from the capital Banjul. It is one of three sacred crocodile pools used as sites for fertility rituals. The others are Folonko in Kombo South and Berending on the north bank.

=== Janjanbureh ===
Janjanbureh or Jangjangbureh is a town, founded in 1732, on Janjanbureh Island in the River Gambia in eastern Gambia. It was formerly known as Georgetown and was the second largest in the country. It is now the capital of the Central River Division and is best known as home to Gambia's main prison. The Wassu stone circles lie 22 km northwest of Lamin Koto, on the north bank across from Janjanbureh. It is one of Gambia's more popular tourist destinations.

== Visitor statistics ==
Most visitors arriving to the Gambia for tourism purposes were from the following countries of nationality:

Country	2023	2012
United Kingdom	32,957	60,424
Netherlands	20,861	19,817
United States	11,266	4,058
Spain	10,087	4,280
Senegal	7,847	
Germany	6,995	7,076
Belgium	6,337	5,802
Nigeria	5,638	8,657
Sweden	4,517	8,107
France	4,312	2,073
