= Currency board (disambiguation) =

A currency board is a fixed exchange rate mechanism in which the issuing institution fully backs the peg with foreign reserves, thus achieving exchange rate stability at the cost of monetary and credit policy autonomy.

"Currency Board" may also refer to the following individual colonial and post-colonial financial institutions (all defunct, except in the Falklands and Gibraltar):

- Board of Commissioners of Currency of Mauritius (1849-1967), issuing the Mauritian rupee
- Board of Commissioners of Currency of Ceylon (1884-1950), issuing the Ceylon rupee
- Board of Commissioners of Currency of British Honduras (1894-1976), issuing the British Honduras dollar
- Board of Commissioners of Currency for the Straits Settlements (1897-1938), issuing the Straits dollar
- Falkland Islands Commissioners of Currency (1899-present), issuing the Falkland Islands pound
- Board of Commissioners of Currency, East Africa Protectorate (1906-1920), issuing the East African rupee
- Board of Commissioners of Currency of Trinidad (1906-1951), issuing the West Indian (Trinidad) dollar
- West African Currency Board (1912-1965), issuing the British West African pound
- Cyprus Commissioner of Currency (1914-1963), issuing the Cypriot pound
- Commissioner of Currency of Gibraltar (1914-present), issuing the Gibraltar pound
- Board of Commissioners of Currency of Fiji (1914-1973), issuing the Fijian pound
- British Solomon Islands Commissioners of Currency (1917-1937), issuing the Solomon Islands pound
- British Guiana Commissioners of Currency (1917-1951), issuing the West Indian (British Guiana) dollar
- Currency Reserve Fund of the Philippine Treasury (1918-1949), issuing the Philippine peso
- East African Currency Board (1919-1966), issuing the East African shilling
- Board of Commissioners of Currency in the Bahamas (1919-1968), issuing the Bahamian pound
- Board of Commissioners of Currency of the Seychelles (1919-1978), issuing the Seychellois rupee
- Commissioners of Currency of Jamaica (1920-1961), issuing the Jamaican pound
- Palestine Currency Board (1926-1952), issuing the Palestine pound
- Currency Commission of Ireland (1927-1943), issuing the Irish pound
- Bermuda Currency Commissioners (1930-1970), issuing the Bermudian pound
- Iraq Currency Board (1932-1949), issuing the Iraqi dinar
- Board of Commissioners of Currency of Tonga (1935-1989), issuing the Tongan pound until 1967 then the Tongan paʻanga
- Board of Commissioners of Currency of Barbados (1938-1951), issuing the West Indian (Barbados) dollar
- Board of Commissioners of Currency, Malaya (1938-1952), issuing the Malayan dollar
- Southern Rhodesia Currency Board (1938-1953), issuing the Southern Rhodesian pound
- Board of Commissioners of Currency of Malta (1940-1968), issuing the Maltese pound
- Burma Currency Board (1947-1952), issuing the Burmese rupee
- Jordan Currency Board (1950-1964), issuing the Jordanian dinar
- British Caribbean Currency Board (1951-1965), issuing the British West Indies dollar
- Libyan Currency Commission (1952-1956), issuing the Libyan pound
- Board of Commissioners of Currency, Malaya and British Borneo (1952-1967), issuing the Malaya and British Borneo dollar
- Central African Currency Board (1953-1956), issuing the Rhodesia and Nyasaland pound
- Sudan Currency Board (1957-1960), issuing the Sudanese pound
- Kuwait Currency Board (1961-1969), issuing the Kuwaiti dinar
- Yemen Currency Board (1964-1967), issuing the Yemeni rial
- The Gambia Currency Board (1964-1971), issuing the Gambian pound
- Bahrain Currency Board (1965-1974), issuing the Bahraini dinar
- Qatar and Dubai Currency Board (1966-1973), issuing the Qatar and Dubai riyal
- Board of Commissioners of Currency, Singapore (1967-2002), issuing the Singapore dollar
- Brunei Currency Board (1967-2004), issuing the Brunei dollar
- Oman Currency Board (1972-1975), issuing the Omani rial
- Cayman Islands Currency Board (1972-1996), issuing the Cayman Islands dollar
- United Arab Emirates Currency Board (1973-1980; actually a central bank), issuing the United Arab Emirates dirham
- Brunei Currency and Monetary Board (2004-2011), issuing the Brunei dollar

== See also ==
- Convertibility plan
- Fixed exchange rate
- Bank of issue
- Institut d'Émission (disambiguation)
