= List of currencies in Africa =

African currency was originally formed from basic items, materials, animals, and even people available in the locality to create a medium of exchange. This started to change from the 17th century onwards, as European colonial powers introduced their own monetary system into the countries they invaded.

As African countries achieved restoration or independence during the 20th century, some retained the new denominations that had been introduced, though others renamed their currencies for various reasons. Today, inflation often creates a demand for more stable (but forbidden) foreign currency, while in rural areas the original bartering system is still in widespread usage.

== History ==
=== Ancient times ===
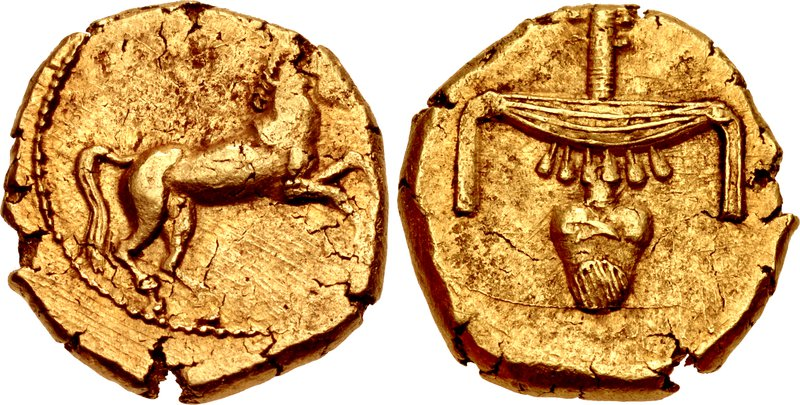
Gold stater of Nectanebo II: reverse with hieroglyphs nfr-nb

Ancient Egypt had a currency called the Egyptian gold stater. This was the first coin ever minted in Egypt, around 360 BCE.

=== Pre-colonial era ===
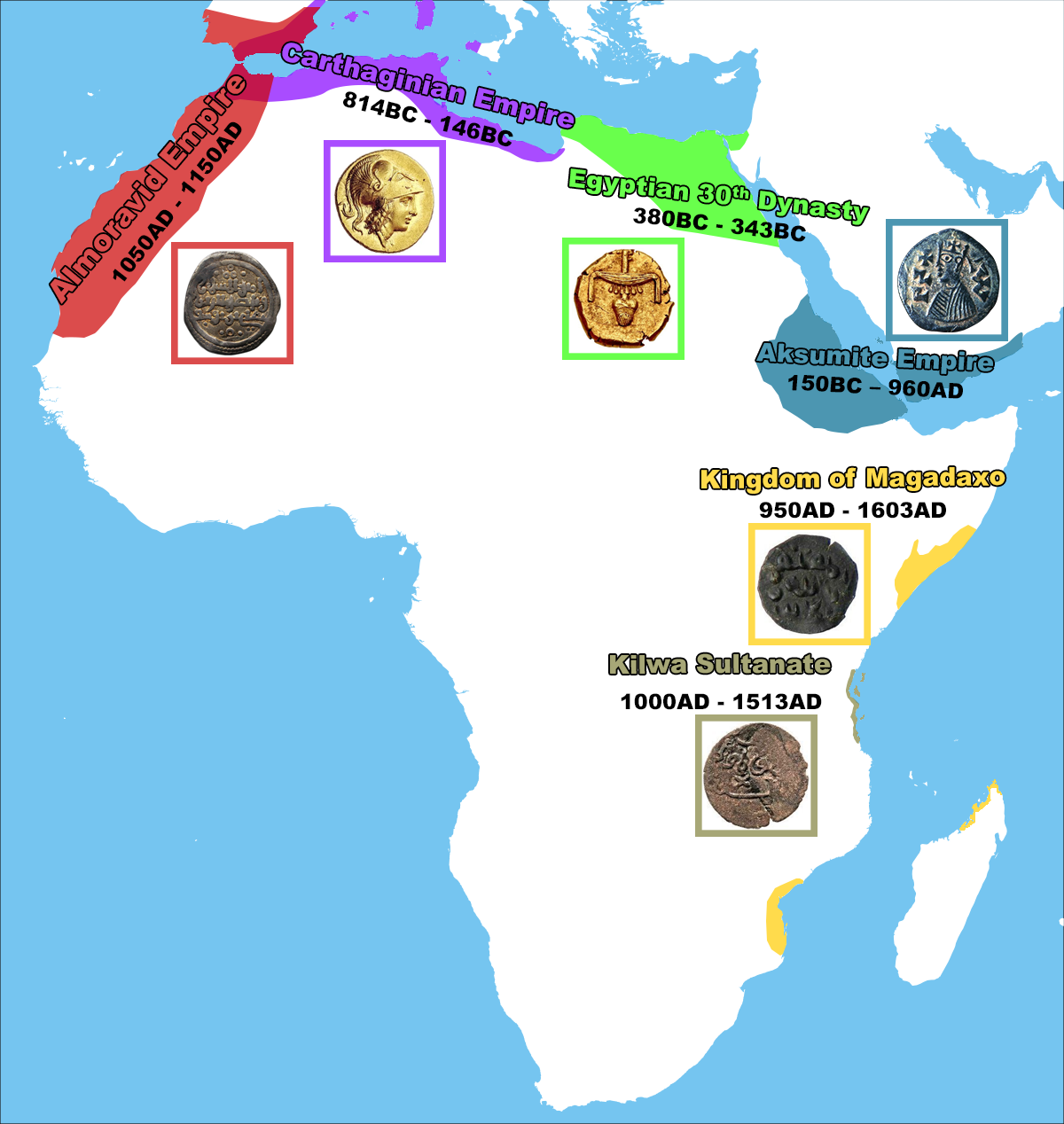
A map of indigenously made pre-colonial African currencies and their respective minting states.

In pre-colonial times, many objects were sometimes used as currency in Africa. These included shells, ingots, gold (gold dust and gold coins (the Asante)), arrowheads, iron, salt, cattle, goats, blankets, axes, beads, and many others.

=== Colonial era ===
In the early 19th century a slave could be bought in West Africa with manilla currency; multiples of X-shaped rings of bronze or other metal that could be strung on a staff.

During colonial times (roughly from 1680 to 1990) the respective colonial powers introduced their own currencies to their colonies or produced local versions of their currencies. These included the Somali shilling; the Italian East African lira; and the African franc (in Francophone countries). Many post-colonial governments have retained the name and notional value unit system of their prior colonial era currency. For example, the British West African pound was replaced by the Nigerian pound, which was divided into shillings, before being replaced by the naira.

=== Modern times ===
A different trend developed when the predominant foreign power relationship changed, causing a change in the currency: the East African rupee (from long-term trade with Arabia and India) was replaced by the East African shilling after the British became the predominant power in the region.

Other countries threw off the dominant currency of a neighbour: the Botswana pula replaced the South African rand in Botswana in 1976. Some countries have not changed their currency despite being post-colonial, for example Uganda retains the Ugandan shilling.

Many African countries have changed their currency's appearance when a new government takes power (often the new head of state will appear on bank notes), although the notional value remains the same. Many African currencies have also experienced episodes of rampant inflation, resulting in the need for currency revaluation (e.g., the Zimbabwe dollar).

Unlicensed street traders have, in some places, conducted a thriving street trade in US dollars or other stable currencies, which are seen as a hedge against local inflation. The seller of the foreign currency builds in a significant premium for their charged exchange rate relative to the official bank rate, but such trading is usually illegal.

Many rural areas still have a strong bartering culture, since the exchanged items are of more immediate value than official currency (following the principle that one can eat a chicken, but not a coin). Even where currency is used, haggling over prices is very common. This is in contrast with the pre-independence Rhodesian dollar, which was always a strong currency linked to the British pound.

== Regional currencies ==
West African CFA franc Central African CFA franc South African rand WAMZ's eco (proposed) East African shilling (proposed)

=== Continent of Africa ===
A monetary union of the entire African continent has been proposed, calling for the creation of a new unified currency, similar to the euro. The hypothetical currency is sometimes referred to as the afro or the afriq.

In April 2021, Wamkele Mene, Secretary General of the AfCFTA said:

"I don't know how long it will take for Africa to have a common currency. It may not happen in our lifetime, but we have got to start somewhere to address the multiplicity of currencies as a constraint for intra-Africa trade."

=== West Africa ===
The West African Monetary Zone (WAMZ) has proposed to create a common currency for all West Africa states, the Eco. In May 2020, an agreement between the French government and 8 West African countries was reached, meaning to change the CFA franc to the Eco; though no plan had been established as of January 2021.

In September 2020, due to the impacts of the COVID-19 pandemic, Côte d'Ivoire president Alassane Ouattara reportedly said, however, that he did not expect the eco to be implemented for at least another 3 to 5 years.

In 2021, the bloc adopted a new plan, aiming to launch the Eco in 2027.

=== East Africa ===
Similarly, in East Africa, the member countries of the East African Community planned to introduce a single currency, the East African shilling, by 2012.

Following delays, the introduction was subsequently postponed to 2024, then to 2031.

== Present currencies ==
Present currencies of African countries
| Currency | ISO 4217 currency code | Currency sign | Country |
|---|---|---|---|
| Algerian dinar | DZD | DA (Latin) دج (Arabic) | Algeria |
| Angolan kwanza | AOA | Kz | Angola |
| Botswana pula | BWP | P | Botswana |
| Burundian franc | BIF | FBu | Burundi |
| Cape Verdean escudo | CVE | | Cabo Verde |
| CFA franc There are two different currencies called the CFA franc: the West African CFA franc (XOF) and the Central African CFA franc (XAF). | XAF | FCFA | Cameroon |
| CFA franc There are two different currencies called the CFA franc: the West African CFA franc (XOF) and the Central African CFA franc (XAF). | XAF | FCFA | Central African Republic |
| CFA franc There are two different currencies called the CFA franc: the West African CFA franc (XOF) and the Central African CFA franc (XAF). | XAF | FCFA | Chad |
| CFA franc There are two different currencies called the CFA franc: the West African CFA franc (XOF) and the Central African CFA franc (XAF). | XAF | FCFA | Republic of the Congo |
| CFA franc There are two different currencies called the CFA franc: the West African CFA franc (XOF) and the Central African CFA franc (XAF). | XAF | FCFA | Equatorial Guinea |
| CFA franc There are two different currencies called the CFA franc: the West African CFA franc (XOF) and the Central African CFA franc (XAF). | XAF | FCFA | Gabon |
| CFA franc There are two different currencies called the CFA franc: the West African CFA franc (XOF) and the Central African CFA franc (XAF). | XOF | CFA | Benin |
| CFA franc There are two different currencies called the CFA franc: the West African CFA franc (XOF) and the Central African CFA franc (XAF). | XOF | CFA | Burkina Faso |
| CFA franc There are two different currencies called the CFA franc: the West African CFA franc (XOF) and the Central African CFA franc (XAF). | XOF | CFA | Guinea-Bissau |
| CFA franc There are two different currencies called the CFA franc: the West African CFA franc (XOF) and the Central African CFA franc (XAF). | XOF | CFA | Côte d'Ivoire |
| CFA franc There are two different currencies called the CFA franc: the West African CFA franc (XOF) and the Central African CFA franc (XAF). | XOF | CFA | Mali |
| CFA franc There are two different currencies called the CFA franc: the West African CFA franc (XOF) and the Central African CFA franc (XAF). | XOF | CFA | Niger |
| CFA franc There are two different currencies called the CFA franc: the West African CFA franc (XOF) and the Central African CFA franc (XAF). | XOF | CFA | Senegal |
| CFA franc There are two different currencies called the CFA franc: the West African CFA franc (XOF) and the Central African CFA franc (XAF). | XOF | CFA | Togo |
| Comorian franc | KMF | FC | Comoros |
| Congolese franc | CDF | FC | Democratic Republic of the Congo |
| Djiboutian franc | DJF | Fdj | Djibouti |
| Egyptian pound | EGP | LE (Latin) ج.م (Egyptian Arabic) | Egypt |
| Eritrean nakfa | ERN | Nkf (Latin script) ናቕፋ (Ge'ez script) ناكفا (Arabic script) | Eritrea |
| Ethiopian birr | ETB | Br (Latin Script) ብር (Ethiopic Script) | Ethiopia |
| Gambian dalasi | GMD | D | Gambia |
| Ghanaian cedi | GHS | ₵ | Ghana |
| Guinean franc | GNF | FG | Guinea |
| Kenyan shilling | KES | KSh | Kenya |
| Lesotho loti | LSL | L (singular) M (plural) | Lesotho |
| Liberian dollar | LRD | $ | Liberia |
| Libyan dinar | LYD | LD (Latin) ل.د (Libyan Arabic) | Libya |
| Malagasy ariary | MGA | Ar | Madagascar |
| Malawian kwacha | MWK | MK | Malawi |
| Mauritanian ouguiya | MRU | UM | Mauritania |
| Mauritian rupee | MUR | Re (singular) Rs (plural) | Mauritius |
| Moroccan dirham | MAD | DH | Morocco |
| Mozambican metical | MZN | Mt | Mozambique |
| Namibian dollar | NAD | N$ | Namibia |
| Nigerian naira | NGN | ₦ | Nigeria |
| Rwandan franc | RWF | FRw | Rwanda |
| São Tomé and Príncipe dobra | STN | Db | Sao Tome and Principe |
| Seychellois rupee | SCR | Re (singular) Rs (plural) | Seychelles |
| Sierra Leonean leone | SLL | Le | Sierra Leone |
| Somali shilling | SOS | Sh.So. | Somalia |
| South African rand | ZAR | R | South Africa |
| South Sudanese pound | SSP | £ | South Sudan |
| Sudanese pound | SDG | LS or ج.س | Sudan |
| Swazi lilangeni | SZL | L (singular) E (plural) | Eswatini |
| Tanzanian shilling | TZS | TSh | Tanzania |
| Tunisian dinar | TND | DT (Latin) د.ت (Tunisian Arabic) | Tunisia |
| Ugandan shilling | UGX | USh | Uganda |
| Zambian kwacha | ZMW | K | Zambia |
| Zimbabwe Gold | ZWG | ZiG | Zimbabwe |

== See also ==
- List of central banks of Africa

== Bibliography ==
- "List of All Currencies Country Wise". Archived from the original on 2021-05-17.
