= West African Currency Board =

Former monetary authority

The West African Currency Board was a bank of issue headquartered in London with a mandate to issue the British West African pound at par with the pound sterling, the currency of British West Africa. As such, it acted as the central bank for the British colonies of the Gambia, Sierra Leone, Gold Coast and Nigeria from its establishment in 1912 to the adoption by the newly independent countries of their own currencies. It was thus succeeded by the Bank of Ghana in 1958, Central Bank of Nigeria in 1959, Bank of Sierra Leone in 1964, and The Gambia Currency Board in 1965.

== Overview ==
The creation of the West African Currency Board was a delayed consequence of the increasingly widespread adoption of the gold standard in the late 19th century and corresponding adjustments in the markets for precious metals, which triggered new concerns about monetary stability. The British authorities were concerned about the potential sudden repatriation of coinage from the West African colonies, which from 1901 to 1910 had absorbed nearly as many coins as had been circulated in Britain itself. The creation of a separate currency was preferred by the British Treasury to the alternative of sharing the seigniorage earned in the colonies, as was advocated by the colonial governors of Lagos and the Gold Coast.

Established in London, the Currency Board started operations in 1913. It kept a reserve in British pound sterling for 100 percent of its issuance of coins and notes. It was the first such currency board serving British colonies and was used as a model for subsequent ones including the East African Currency Board, Southern Rhodesia Currency Board, and currency boards in post-WWII Libya and Somaliland. It distributed its profits to the governments of the four colonies: from 1912 to 1950 these amounted to 8.7 million pounds, of which Nigeria received 4.5 million (52 percent), the Gold Coast 3.3 million (38 percent), Sierra Leone 0.7 million (8 percent), and the Gambia 0.2 million (2 percent).

== Dissolution ==
With independence, former British colonies opted for activist national monetary policies that was incompatible with the disciplines of the currency board, in contrast with most of French-speaking Africa which kept the CFA franc in a supranational Paris-centric monetary union. Ghana's first finance minister Komla Agbeli Gbedemah declared: "A Currency Board is the financial hallmark of colonialism. And it is a dead thing as well, an automatic machine which has no volition of its own".

Ghana adopted the Ghanaian pound and Nigeria the Nigerian pound, both in 1958, then Sierra Leone introduced the leone in 1964, and finally the Gambia introduced the Gambian pound in 1965. The West African Currency Board was consequently dissolved in 1965. Its assets and liabilities were handed over to the Crown Agents who became responsible for its residual functions.

== See also ==
- Currency board
- Banque de l'Afrique Occidentale
