= Sri Lankan rupee =

Currency of Sri Lanka

ශ්‍රී ලංකා රුපියල් (Sinhala); இலங்கை ரூபாய் (Tamil)
- 1991 series 1000 rupee banknotes

ISO 4217
- Code: LKR (numeric: 144)
- Subunit: 0.01

Units of account
- Symbol: ₨, රු, ௹
- Subunit
- 1/100: cent

Denominations
- Banknotes: 20, 50, 100, 500, 1000, 2000, 5000 rupees
- Coins: 1, 2, 5, 10, 20 rupees

Demographics
- User(s): Sri Lanka

Issuance
- Central bank: Board of Commissioners of Currency of Ceylon (1884–1950); Central Bank of Ceylon (1950–1985); Central Bank of Sri Lanka (1986–)
- Website: cbsl.gov.lk
- Printer: De La Rue Lanka Currency and Security Print (Pvt) Ltd
- Website: delarue.com
- Mint: Royal Mint, United Kingdom
- Website: royalmint.com

Valuation
- Inflation: ▼ -2.60 % (2024)
- Source: Central Bank of Sri Lanka
- Method: CPI

Exchange rate to US$1 since 1973

The Sri Lankan rupee (Sinhala: රුපියල්, Tamil: ரூபாய்; symbol: ₨ in English, රු in Sinhala, ௹ in Tamil; ISO code: LKR), known until 1972 as the Ceylonese rupee, is the currency of Sri Lanka. It is subdivided into 100 cents (Sinhala: සත, Tamil: சதம்), but cents are rarely seen in circulation today due to their low value. It is issued by the Central Bank of Sri Lanka. The abbreviation Re (singular) and Rs (plural) is generally used, the World Bank suggests SL Rs as a fully disambiguating abbreviation for distinction from other currencies named "rupee".

== History ==
Sterling became Ceylon's official currency in 1825, replacing the Ceylonese rixdollar at a rate of £1 = 13 1/3 rixdollars, and British silver coins were made legal tender. Treasury notes denominated in sterling were issued in 1827, replacing the earlier rixdollar notes. Rixdollar notes not presented for exchange were demonetized in June 1831.

The Indian rupee was made Ceylon's standard coin on 26 September 1836, and Ceylon reverted to the Indian currency area. Sterling-denominated treasury notes continued to circulate after 1836, along with the rupee. The legal currency remained British silver and accounts were kept in pounds, shillings and pence. However, payments were made in rupees and annas at the "fictitious par" (fixed accounting rate) of two shillings per rupee (i.e. £1 = Rs. 10/-).

The Bank of Ceylon was the first private bank to issue banknotes on the island (1844) and Treasury notes were withdrawn in 1856.

The Indian rupee was formally established as the unlimited legal tender 18 June 1869. The rupee was decimalized 23 August 1871. Thus, the rupee of 100 cents became Ceylon's money of account and sole legal tender effective 1 January 1872, replacing sterling at a rate of Re. 1/- equalling two shillings and three pence sterling.

Following the Ceylon banking and monetary crisis of 1884, in which the largest exchange bank in the island, The Orient Bank experienced an acute liquidity shortage, resulting in a run on the other two exchange banks, Chartered Mercantile Bank and the Bank of Madras. The Government of Ceylon, stepped in an enacted the Paper Currency Ordinance of 1884 which was based on a similar Ordinance in Mauritius in 1876. The Paper Currency Ordinance, established a currency board, the Board of Commissioners of Currency of Ceylon was established consisting of the Colonial Secretary of Ceylon, the Treasurer of Ceylon, and the Auditor-General of Ceylon. This Ordinance linked the Ceylon currency notes and the Indian silver rupees being mutually convertible at the office of the Currency Commissioners at a nominal par without any commission of one Ceylon rupee note to one Indian rupee coin.

By April 2022, political upheaval in Sri Lanka made the Sri Lankan rupee the world's "worst performing currency," according to the Financial Times. The currency's exchange rate had plummeted to over Rs. 350/- = US$1 as of 29 April 2022.

== Coins ==
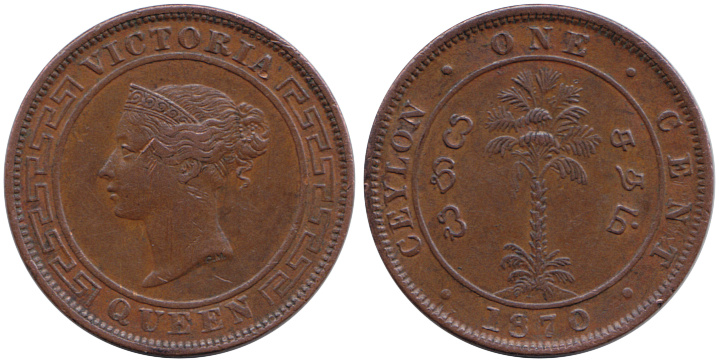
1 cent coin struck at the Royal Mint in 1870

In 1872, copper 1/4c, 1/2c, 1c and 5c coins dated 1870 were introduced, followed in 1892 by silver 10c, 25c and 50c. Production of the 1/4c ceased in 1904. The large, copper 5c coin was replaced in 1909 by a much smaller cupro-nickel coin which was square with rounded corners. In 1919, the fineness of silver used was reduced from .800 to .550.

Between 1940 and 1944, a wholesale change in the coinage was carried out. Production of the 1/2c ceased in 1940, with bronze 1c introduced in 1942 with reduced weight and thickness. Nickel-brass replaced cupro-nickel in the 5c in the same year and replaced silver in the 25c and 50c in 1943. In 1944, nickel-brass, scalloped shaped 2c and 10c coins were introduced. The scalloped 10c coin replaced the silver 10c coin. Later 2c coins issued in 1957 were the only coins from this period to ever depict Queen Elizabeth II. Coins with the portrait of King George VI continued to be in circulation after his death in 1952. In 1957, cupro-nickel Re. 1/- coins and .925 silver Rs. 5/- coins commemorating 2,500 years of Buddhism were issued.

In 1963, a new coinage was introduced which omitted the monarch's portrait, depicting instead The Armorial ensign of Ceylon. Coins issued were aluminium 1c and 2c, nickel brass 5c and 10c and cupro-nickel 25c and 50c and Re. 1/-. These coins had the same shapes and sizes of the previous series but were composed of different materials. In 1976, commemorative seven-sided Rs. 2/- and ten-sided Rs. 5/- coins were introduced in limited numbers. In 1978, devaluation prompted aluminum to be the replacement of nickel-brass in the 5c and 10c, while shortly after 1c and 2c were discontinued. Cupro-nickel Rs. 2/- and aluminium-bronze Rs. 5/- coins were introduced in 1984 fully replacing the corresponding banknotes. In 1987, commemorative Rs. 10/- were released which like the 5c coin was square with round edges. In 1998 a bimetallic commemorative Rs. 10/- coin was released. Like earlier forerunner rupee denominations, these were again only issued in limited supply, not intended to replace the corresponding banknotes.

The obverse of the coins issued since 1972 carry the Armorial Ensign of the Republic of Sri Lanka. The reverse of the coin the value in numerals and in Sinhala, Tamil and English below and year of issue at the bottom with SRI LANKA in Sinhala on top. The lower denominations of 1c, 2c, 5c, 10c, 25c and 50c are not in circulation and the minting of these denominations had been discontinued.

The obverse and reverse designs of the new coins remained identical to the circulating coins of the new series based on similar denominations. However their weights and compositions have been changed to electroplated steel as opposed to a solid alloy for easier identification purposes and to save on production expense.

In the year 2017, a complete new series of stainless steel coins was introduced and is currently in circulation.

2005 – Old coin series of Sri Lanka
Image	Value	Obverse	Reverse	Metal	Diameter	Weight	Thickness	Edge	Year
	25c	Armorial Ensign	Country name, year and value	Copper-plated Steel	16.0 mm	1.68 g	1.2 mm	Plain	2005
	50c	Armorial Ensign	Country name, year and value	Copper-plated Steel	18.0 mm	2.5 g	1.4 mm	Plain	2005
	Re. 1/-	Armorial Ensign	Country name, year and value	Brass-plated Steel	20.0 mm	3.65 g	1.7 mm	Milled	2005
	Rs. 2/-	Armorial Ensign	Country name, year and value	Nickel-plated Steel	28.5 mm	7.0 g	1.5 mm	Milled	2005
	Rs. 5/-	Armorial Ensign	Country name, year and value	Brass-plated steel	23.5 mm	7.7 g	2.7 mm	Lettered	2005
	Rs. 10/-	Armorial Ensign	Country name, year and value	Nickel-plated Steel	26.4 mm (Hendecagon)	8.36 g	2.1 mm	Plain	2009

=== 2017 - New coin series ===
2017 New coin series of Sri Lanka
Image	Denomination	Obverse	Reverse	Metal	Diameter	Thickness	Shape	Edge	Year
	Re. 1/-	Country name, Armorial ensign and Year (Trilingual text in Sinhala, Tamil, and English)	Value	Stainless steel	20 mm	1.75 mm	Round	Intermitted Milled	2017
	Rs. 2/-	Country name, Armorial ensign and Year (Trilingual text in Sinhala, Tamil, and English)	Value	Stainless steel	22 mm	1.75 mm	Round	Notched	2017
	Rs. 5/-	Country name, Armorial ensign and Year (Trilingual text in Sinhala, Tamil, and English)	Value	Stainless steel	23.5 mm	1.8 mm	Round	Milled with regular indentations	2017
	Rs. 10/-				26.4 mm	1.8 mm	Eleven lobed	Milled with regular indentations	2017
	Rs. 20/-			Aluminium Bronze	28 mm	2.0 mm	Seven lobed	Plain	2020

=== Commemorative coins ===
The Central Bank of Sri Lanka has issued commemorative coins since 1957.

On 15 December 2010, to mark the 60th Anniversary, the Central Bank of Sri Lanka issued a frosted proof crown size multi-colour silver commemorative coin in the denomination of Rs. 5,000/-. It was the first multi-colour coin issued by the Central Bank. CBSL has published a new limited edition of 1000 Rs commemorative coin on 9 March 2023, to commemorate Sri Lanka's 75th Independence Day Celebration. The 1000 Rs commemorative coins will be up for sale for Rs.6,000 per coin at listed CBSL sales outlets.

Commemorative coins issued by the Central Bank of Sri Lanka:

== Banknotes ==
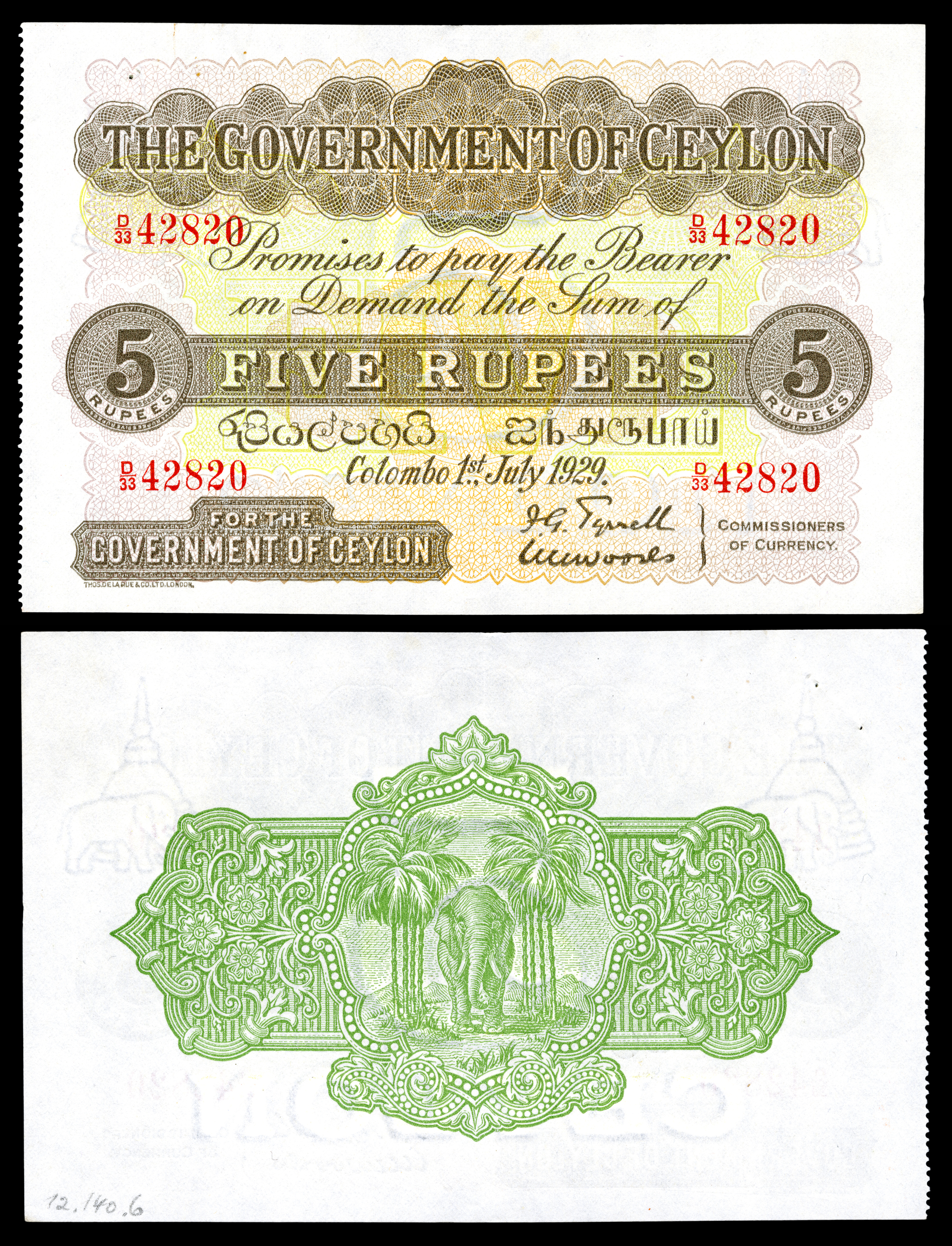
Government of Ceylon, Rs. 5/- (1929)

The Government of Ceylon introduced its first rupee banknote issue in 1885. A Rs. 5/- note (1885–1925) was followed by Rs. 10/- (1894–1926) and Rs. 1,000/- notes (1899 and 1915). A second issue included the Re. 1/- (1917–1939), Rs. 2/- (1917–1921), Rs. 50/- (1914) and Rs. 100/- (1919) notes. During the 1920s (and in some cases the 1930s) the Re. 1/- (mentioned above), Rs. 2/- (1925–39), two types of Rs. 5/- (1925–28 and 1929–39), two types of Rs. 10/- (1927–28 and 1929–39), Rs. 50/- (1922–39), Rs. 100/- (1926–39), Rs. 500/- (1926), and Rs. 1,000/- (1929) notes were all in circulation.

There were two issues in 1941. The first consisted of a Re. 1/-, Rs. 2/-, Rs. 5/-, Rs. 10/- banknote issued only in 1941. Though issued slightly earlier, a Rs. 1,000/- note (1938) has been grouped with this issue. The 1941 second issue consisted of Re. 1/- (1941–49), Rs. 2/- (1941–49), Rs. 5/- (1941–49), Rs. 10/- (1941–46), Rs. 50/- (1941–45), Rs. 100/- (1941–45), Rs. 1,000/- (1941), and Rs. 10,000/- (1947) notes. (Note: The Rs. 10,000/- note was used for inter-bank transactions only.) In 1942, fractional banknote issues were introduced. A 25c and 50c note (1942) were followed by a second issue of 5c (1942), 10c (1942–43), 25c (1942–49), and 50c notes (1942–49).

The Central Bank of Ceylon (Note: The Central Bank of Ceylon was established by the Monetary Law Act (MLA) No. 58 of 1949 and commenced operations on 28 August 1950.) issued Re. 1/- and Rs. 10/- notes (1951), Rs. 1/-, Rs. 2/-, Rs. 5/-, Rs. 50/-, and Rs. 100/- notes (1952–54) (Note: The Rs. 5/- note was not issued in 1953 and the Rs. 10/- note was issued in 1953 and 1954.)

The Re. 1/- notes were replaced by coins in 1963.

From 1977, banknotes were issued by the Central Bank of Sri Lanka. Rs. 20/- notes were introduced in 1979, followed by Rs. 500/- and Rs. 1,000/- in 1981. The Rs. 200/- in 1998 and Rs. 2,000/- in 2006 (discontinued). Sri Lankan banknotes are unusual in that they are printed vertically on the reverse. In 1998, a Rs. 200/- note was issued to commemorate the 50th anniversary of independence (1948–1998). This is the first polymer banknote issued in Sri Lanka, and it was printed by Note Printing Australia. All other denominations are printed by the De la Rue Lanka Currency and Securities Print (Pvt) Ltd, a joint venture of the Government of Sri Lanka and De La Rue.

Portraits of former Sri Lankan prime ministers and former president Mahinda Rajapaksa have graced the fronts of Sri Lankan bank notes, while the backs have featured Sri Lankan fauna and flora, Sri Lankan landscapes and industries, and images depicting Sri Lankan culture, history, and achievements.

== Exchange rate ==
Current LKR exchange rates
From Google Finance:	AUD CAD CHF CNY EUR GBP HKD JPY USD INR
From Yahoo! Finance:	AUD CAD CHF CNY EUR GBP HKD JPY USD INR
From XE.com:	AUD CAD CHF CNY EUR GBP HKD JPY USD INR
From OANDA:	AUD CAD CHF CNY EUR GBP HKD JPY USD INR

The Sri Lankan rupee is a closed currency which means it is not available to buy or sell outside of Sri Lanka. One can buy LKR at the Sri Lankan airport or currency outlets available throughout the country.

On 7 March 2023, the rupee gained 0.5% to trade at 250.8 per dollar, registering a 14% increase after the announcement by the IMF that it will finalize a $2.9 billion bailout for Sri Lanka on 20 March and receiving assurances from China that it will assist in the country's debt restructuring efforts. However, Fitch Ratings has published a prediction article on 8 March 2023, that the rupee will depreciate by roughly 23%, reaching an all-time low of 290 per dollar by the end of the year.

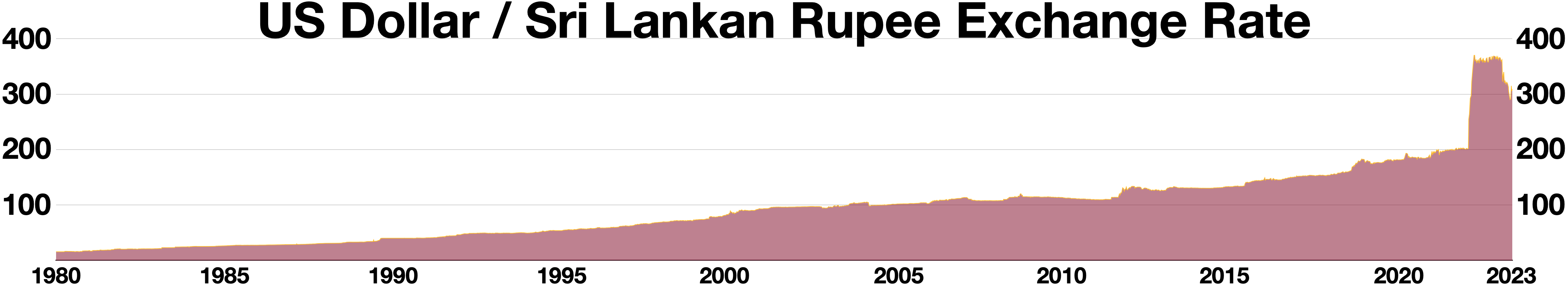
USD / Sri Lankan Rupee exchange rate In early March 2022 the Sri Lankan Rupee began losing value quickly

== See also ==
- Economy of Sri Lanka
