= Jean-Baptiste Ngnetchopa =

Cameroonian Woodcarver

Jean-Baptiste Ngnetchopa (born 1953) is a Cameroonian woodcarver. He achieved international attention from a series of banknotes from Africa carved in wood. He has appeared in international exhibitions and shows like Africa hoy in 1991.

== Background ==
Ngnetchopa was born to a family of traditional woodcarvers from a village of the Bamileke people in Cameroun. At age 16, he entered into a seven-year apprenticeship.

Ngnetchopa's work has evolved into an exploration of, "the relationship among art, power and money" that balances between the worlds of pop-culture and contemporary art. His banknotes utilize black ink on the wood panels to highlight the carved and incised details.

Ngnetchopa has said that, "Some rich people put their money in a vault. This money is dormant and loses value. I ask these rich people to surrender part of this money to me and I will carve them money of wood which they can live with and show to others. And this wooden money will also acquire value."

== Exhibitions ==
=== 2011 ===
- Art et Argent, liaisons dangereuses, Monnaie de Paris, Paris, France.
- Virtual exhibition (The Contemporary African Art Collection)

=== 2001 ===
- Platea dell’ Umanità – 49° Biennale di Venezia
- Giardini di Castello / Arsenale – Venice VE, Italy (The Contemporary African Art Collection)

=== 1991 ===
- Africa hoy
- Atlantic Center of Modern Art.
- Las Palmas Gran Canary - Spain. (The Contemporary African Art Collection)
