= Anne-Marie Dias Borges =

French journalist

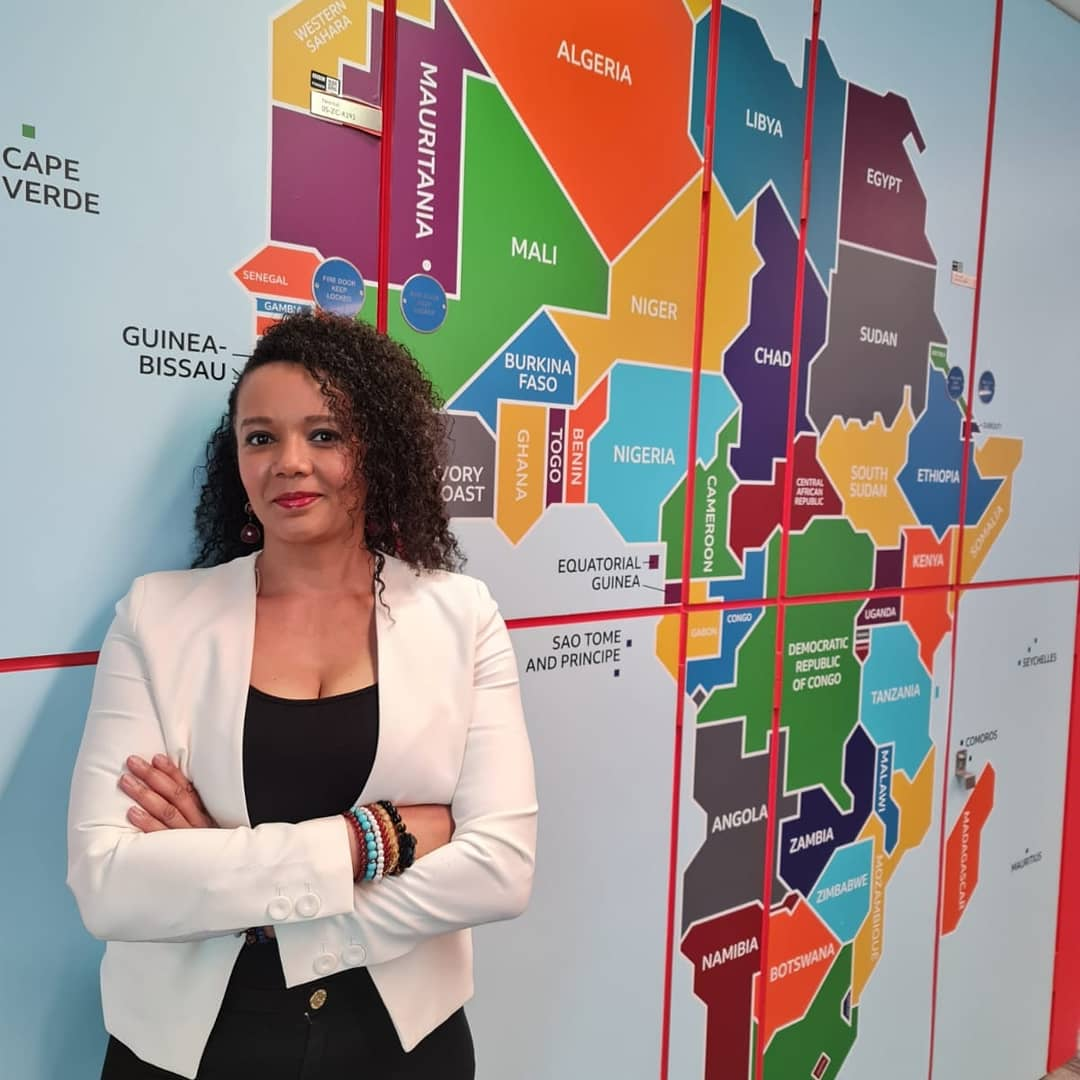
- Dias Borges at BBC in 2021
- Born: 18 December 1976 (age 49); Riom, France
- Education: Lycée d’Etat Estienne d’Orves
- Alma mater: University of London (BA)
- Occupations: Presenter; TV anchor; Senior broadcast journalist
- Years active: 2002–present
- Employer: BBC Business TV (2016–present)
- Organization: BBC

Anne-Marie Dias Borges (born 18 December 1976) is a Franco-Cape-Verdean journalist and radio and television host. She currently works as a Senior Broadcast Journalist and Presenter for BBC Business TV, position she has held since 2016.

== Biography ==
=== Early life and education ===
Anne-Marie Dias Borges was born in Riom, France, on 18 December 1976, daughter of Cape-Verdean parents from the island of Santiago. Her early years were spent between the French Alps and Nice, where she attended high school at Lycée d’Etat Estienne d’Orves, on the French Riviera.

In 1997, she moved to London and obtained in 2000 a Bachelor of Arts in African Studies at the University of London, combined with Development Studies and Portuguese and Japanese from the School of Oriental. She additionally obtained that same year syllabuses in Literature of Portuguese Africa and History of Portuguese Africa from King's College at the University of London in London, United Kingdom.

=== Career ===
Anne-Marie began her career in 2002 at BBC Afrique radio. Recognized for her dynamic personality during her 9 years at this network, she was voted "Most popular presenter" on numerous occasions.

In 2015, she joined Africa24 TV, mostly considered as the African "CNN", in Paris, where she worked as chief information officer and TV Anchor. She notably hosted a weekly political TV debate called "Polititia", a show watched by millions of viewers.

Since 2016, Anne-Marie Dias Borges co-leads the BBC Business French TV team in London, which produces two regular TV shows: Questions d’Argent and Cash Eco (on hold due to COVID-19).

=== Other ===
"I want my work to positively impact our communities. I want to inspire women, create a synergy between the people who see me on TV or those I meet during my conferences. In other words, I want to get in touch with the audience", assures Anne-Marie Dias Borges.

— Moustapha Mbaye, "Anne-Marie Dias Borges: "Libérer la lumière qui est en nous pour inspirer les autres"(in French)". Femmes Au Pluriel. 5 May 2020.

Anne-Marie Dias Borges has been the Master of ceremony for many relevant international conferences over the past several years, she has travelled all over the world to host events and manage campaigns. Fluent in French, English, Spanish, Portuguese and Portuguese Creole, she has provided hundreds of hours of live and pre-recorded television, radio, and conference presenting, as well as interviews with key international figures, politicians, and artists, most notably Ngozi Okonjo-Iweala, the first woman and the first African to be chosen as Director-General of the World Trade Organization (WTO), Wamkele Keabetswe Mene, Secretary General of the African Continental Free Trade Area (AfCFTA), Jean-Pierre Bemba, the former vice-president of the Democratic Republic of Congo and Senegalese artist and activist, Youssou N’dour.

In April 2021, she hosted the High-Level Virtual Dialogue on Feeding Africa event, a dialogue organized by the African Development Bank under the theme "Leadership to scale up successful innovations" and which seventeen heads of state, governments and multilateral institutions attended.

== Philanthropic ==
In 2010 and 2011, she has organized two successful anti-drugs campaigns in Cabo Verde, in partnership with the government and the United Nations. One of the highlights of the last campaign was the release of a popular song "Ka bo usa" ("Don’t use"), which she co-wrote with Cape-Verdean Award-winning artist Johnny Ramos.

== Personal life ==
Anne-Marie Dias Borges is resident in England, United Kingdom.

== Awards and recognition ==
- 2020 : 100 Most influential African Women in Africa (Avance Media)
- 2020 : 500 Africadoers (Tropics Magazine)
- 2021 : Top 20 Inspirational Women of the African Diaspora Professional Women in Europe (ADIPWE), ranked sixth.

== Notable events ==
Year	Conference	Position	Location	Notes
2015	Rebranding Africa Forum	Master of Ceremony	Brussels, Belgium	
2015	Francophonie Economic Forum	Panel Moderator	Paris, France	
2016	African Business Lawyer's Club Conference	Panel Moderator	Paris, France	
2016	Rebranding Africa Forum	Master of Ceremony	Brussels, Belgium	
2017	Afrobytes Conference	Panel Moderator	Paris, France	
2017	Portuguese Africa, African Conference	Invited Guest speaker	Cambridge University	
2017	Believe in Africa Conference	Panel Moderator	Marrakesh, Morocco	
2017	Africa Time for a New Deal Conference	Master of Ceremony	Paris, France	
2017	International Construction Industry Summit	Panel Moderator	Dakar, Senegal	
2017	West African Economic and Monetary Conference	Master of Ceremony	Lomé, Togo	
2019	The Women Entrepreneurs Finance Initiative Summit	Master of Ceremony	Abidjan, Ivory Coast	
2019	Women in Business – Africa CEO Forum	Master of Ceremony	Paris, France	
2019	2019 Development Finance Forum	Master of Ceremony	Abidjan, Ivory Coast	
2019	Annual Meetings of the World Bank	Moderator for IDA-19	New York City	
2020	Africa Day	Master of Ceremony	Dakar, Senegal	
2020	World Bank’s J-CAP 2020	Master of Ceremony	Abidjan, Ivory Coast	
2020	The WAN (Worldwide Afro Network) Show	Host		
2020	6 webinars by the Africa CEO Forum	Master of Ceremony		
2020	The Quarantine Chronicles with Tim Reid	Guest		
2020	Raw Real Talks with Mariama Camara	Guest		
2020	Launch of "The Pulse" by the World Bank	Host		
2020	Africa50 Innovation Challenge	Panelist		
2020	Gender Equality by African Innovation Week	Panelist		
2020	African Insurance Awards 2020	Host		
2021	World Bank's Spring Meetings, Covid-19	Host		
2021	EU-Africa Green Talks	Host		
2021	High-Level Virtual Dialogue on Feeding Africa: Leadership to scale up successful innovations	Host		
