= Pound sign =

Currency sign

£

Pound sign
- In Unicode: U+00A3 £ POUND SIGN (&pound;)

Currency
- Currency: Pound

Graphical variants
- ￡
- U+FFE1 ￡ FULLWIDTH POUND SIGN

Different from
- Different from: U+20A4 ₤ LIRA SIGN; U+0023 # NUMBER SIGN

The £ grapheme in a selection of fonts

The pound sign (£) is the symbol for the pound, the modern unit of account of sterling (the currency of the United Kingdom) and of other currencies such as the Egyptian and Syrian pounds. The sign may be drawn with one or two bars depending on personal preference, but the Bank of England has used the one-bar style exclusively on banknotes since 1975.

In the United States, "pound sign" refers to the symbol # (number sign). In Canada, "pound sign" can mean £ or #.

== Origin ==
The symbol derives from the upper case Latin letter L, representing libra pondo, the basic unit of weight in the Roman Empire, which in turn derives from the Latin word libra, meaning scales or a balance. The pound became an English unit of weight and in England became defined as the tower pound (equivalent to 350 grams) of sterling silver. According to the Royal Mint Museum:

It is not known for certain when the horizontal line or lines, which indicate an abbreviation, first came to be drawn through the L. However, there is in the Bank of England Museum a cheque dated 7 January 1661 with a clearly discernible £ sign. By the time the Bank was founded in 1694 the £ sign was in common use.

However, the simple letter L, in lower- or uppercase, was used to represent the pound in printed books and newspapers until well into the 19th century. In the blackletter type used until the seventeenth century, the letter L is rendered as $\mathfrak{L}$.

== Usage ==
When used for sterling, the pound sign is placed before the numerals (e.g., £12,000) and separated from the following digits by no space or only a thin space. In the UK, the sign is used without any prefix. In Egypt and Lebanon, a disambiguating letter is added (E£ or £E and £L respectively). In international banking and foreign exchange operations, the symbol is rarely used: the ISO 4217 currency code (e.g., GBP, EGP, etc.) is preferred. (Note: Prior to ISO 4217, abbreviations such as "stg" or "STG" were traditionally used to disambiguate sterling from other currencies that used the symbol.)

== Other English variants ==
In all varieties of English except American English, the symbol £ is called the pound sign. In Canada, the symbol # is sometimes called the pound sign too, though it is most often known as the number sign.

In American English, the term pound sign usually refers to the symbol # (number sign), and the corresponding telephone key is called the "pound key".

== Historic variants ==
=== Double bar style ===
Banknotes issued by the Bank of England since 1975 have used only the single bar style as a pound sign. The bank used both the two-bar style (₤) and the one-bar style (£) (and sometimes a figure without any symbol whatever) more or less equally from 1725 to 1971 intermittently and sometimes concurrently. In typography, the symbols are allographs – style choices – when used to represent the pound; consequently computer fonts use the U+00A3 £ POUND SIGN (Unicode) code point irrespective of which style chosen, (not U+20A4 ₤ LIRA SIGN despite its similarity). It is a font design choice on how to draw the symbol at U+00A3. Although most fonts do so with one bar, the two-bar style is not rare, as may be seen in the illustration above.

=== Other ===
Note the leading J of Jacquard

In the eighteenth-century Caslon metal fonts, the pound sign was an italic uppercase J, rotated 180 degrees.

== Currencies that use the pound sign ==
- Egypt: Egyptian pound
- Falkland Islands: Falkland Islands pound
- Gibraltar: Gibraltar pound
- Guernsey: Guernsey pound
- Isle of Man: Manx pound
- Jersey: Jersey pound
- Saint Helena: Saint Helena pound
- South Sudan: South Sudanese pound
- Sudan: Sudanese pound
- Syria: Syrian pound
- United Kingdom: Pound sterling

=== Former currencies ===
- American Colonies:
  - Connecticut pound
  - Delaware pound
  - Georgia pound
  - Maryland pound
  - New Hampshire pound
  - New Jersey pound
  - New York pound
  - North Carolina pound
  - Pennsylvania pound
  - Rhode Island pound
  - South Carolina pound
  - Virginia pound
- Australia: Australian pound
- The Bahamas: Bahamian pound
- Bermuda: Bermudian pound
- British Mandatory Palestine: Palestine pound
- Canada: Canadian pound
  - New Brunswick pound
  - Nova Scotian pound
  - Prince Edward Island pound
- Cyprus: Cypriot pound
- France: French livre
- Fiji: Fijian pound
- The Gambia: Gambian pound
- Ghana: Ghanaian pound
- Ireland: Irish pound
- Israel: Israeli pound
- Italy: Italian lira (informally, see Italian lira § Notation and symbols)
- Malta: Maltese pound
- Newfoundland: Newfoundland pound
- New Zealand: New Zealand pound
- Rhodesia: Rhodesian pound
- South Africa: South African pound
- Scotland: Pound Scots
- Tonga: Tongan pound
- Western Samoa: Western Samoan pound
- Yemen : Yemeni dinar

== Use with computers ==
In the Unicode standard, the pound sign is encoded at U+00A3 £ POUND SIGN (&pound;) Whether the symbol is drawn with one or two bars in a particular font is the type designer's choice, as explained above; the key point is that the code is constant irrespective of the presentation chosen. (Note: There is a separate code point, U+20A4 ₤ LIRA SIGN Unicode notes that the "lira sign" is not widely used and was added due to both it and the pound sign being available on HP printers.)

The encoding of the £ symbol in position xA3 (163_{10}) was first standardised by ISO Latin-1 (an "extended ASCII") in 1985. Position xA3 was used by the Digital Equipment Corporation VT220 terminal, Mac OS Roman, Amstrad CPC, Amiga, and Acorn Archimedes.

Many early computers (limited to a 7-bit, 128-position character set) used a variant of ASCII with one of the less-frequently used characters replaced by the £. The UK national variant of ISO 646 was standardised as BS 4730 in 1985. This code was identical to ASCII except for two characters: x23 encoded £ instead of #, while x7E encoded ‾ (overline) instead of ~ (tilde). MS-DOS on the IBM PC originally used a proprietary 8-bit character set Code page 437 in which the £ symbol was encoded as x9C; Microsoft's adoption of the ISO/IEC 8859-1 ("ISO Latin-1") standard code xA3 only came later with Microsoft Windows. The Atari ST also used position x9C. The HP LaserJet used position xBA (ISO/IEC 8859-1: º) for the £ symbol, while most other printers used x9C. The BBC Ceefax system, which dated from 1976, encoded the £ as x23. The Sinclair ZX80 and ZX81 characters sets used x0C (ASCII: form feed). The ZX Spectrum and the BBC Micro used x60 (ASCII: `, grave). The Commodore 64 used x5C (ASCII: \) while the Oric computers used x5F (ASCII: _). IBM's EBCDIC code page 037 uses xB1 for the £ while its code page 285 uses x5B. ICL's 1900-series mainframes used a six-bit (64-position character set) encoding for characters, loosely based on BS 4730, with the £ symbol represented as octal 23 (hex 13, dec 19).

== Other uses ==
British political party UK Independence Party used a logo based on the pound sign, symbolising the party's opposition to adoption of the euro and to the European Union generally.

The pound sign was used as an uppercase letter (the lowercase being ⟨ſ⟩, long s) to signify the sound [ʒ] in the early 1993–1995 version of the Turkmen Latin alphabet.

== See also ==
- Latin letter L with stroke Ł ł
- Semuncia 𐆒
- Category:Currency symbols
