= Gambian pound =

Currency of The Gambia, 1965 to 1971

The pound (symbol: £) was the currency of The Gambia between 1965 and 1971. Gambia used the British West African pound until it issued its own currency on October 5, 1964. In 1971, the dalasi replaced the pound at a rate of £1 = D5 (or D1 = 4/–). 1 pound was made up of 20 shillings (symbol: "s" or "/–"), each shilling consisting of 12 pence (symbol: "d", for denarius).

== History ==
When the Gambia was granted internal self-government in October 1963, rather than being a constituent colony of British West Africa, the West African Currency Board ordered that the Gambian pound should replace the British West African pound in the colony, and an order for unique 10/-, £1 and £5 banknotes was lodged with British banknote printer Bradbury Wilkinson & Co. Ltd. The new notes were issued within four days of the new currency ordinance under the oversight of The Gambia Currency Board, which came into effect on 1 October 1964.

The Gambia Currency Board issued the Gambia's first coinage, struck by the Royal Mint, to replace the British West African coins, on 21 November 1966. The values remained the same although the 1/10d and 1/2d coins were not issued, whilst a 4/– piece went into circulation. An 8/– coin was subsequently struck in 1970.

The Central Bank of the Gambia took over assets and liabilities of the Gambia Currency Board in 1971, and a new decimal currency was introduced to replace the Gambian pound. The new currency was named the dalasi (symbol: "D") with D1 being subdivided into 100 bututs. Again, the coins were minted by the Royal Mint and the notes were printed by Bradbury Wilkinson & Co. Ltd.

== Coins ==
Coins were introduced by the Gambia Currency Board on 18 February 1966 and these were minted by the Royal Mint in denominations of 1d, 3d and 6d, 1/–, 2/– and 4/–, with 8/– added in 1970. All coins had Queen Elizabeth II's portrait on the obverse.

Value	Date	Composition	Reverse
1d	1966	Bronze	Native sailing boat
3d	1966	Aluminium bronze	Double-spurred spurfowl
6d	1966	Cupronickel	Three peanuts
1/–	1966	Cupronickel	Oil palm
2/–	1966	Cupronickel	African domestic ox
4/–	1966	Cupronickel	Slender-snouted crocodile
8/–	1970	Cupronickel	Hippopotamus

The Gambian 8/– coin is the only coin of this denomination ever minted. With the exception of the Hippopotamus, the reverse designs of the pre-decimal coins were reused on the new dalasi coins.

== Banknotes ==
On October 5, 1964, new banknotes were introduced by the Gambia Currency Board in denominations of 10/–, £1 and £5. All notes had a sailing boat with a forest background on the obverse and were produced until 1970.

Value	Colour	Reverse
10/–	Green	Natives tending their crops
£1	Red	Labourers working at a wharf
£5	Blue	People using hand powered machinery

== See also ==
- Economy of the Gambia
