= Riom =

- Subprefecture and commune
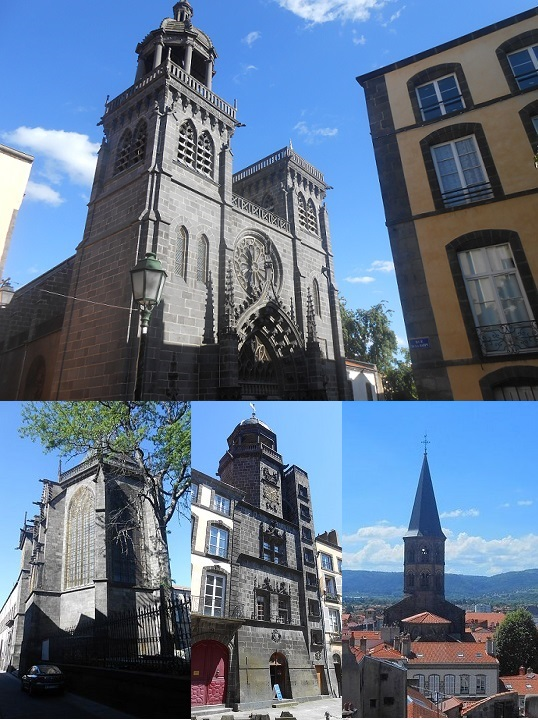
- Buildings of Riom

- Coat of arms
- Location of Riom
- Location within France Location within Auvergne-Rhône-Alpes
- Coordinates: 45°53′40″N 3°06′48″E
- Country: France
- Region: Auvergne-Rhône-Alpes
- Department: Puy-de-Dôme
- Arrondissement: Riom
- Canton: Riom
- Intercommunality: CA Riom Limagne et Volcans

Government
  - Mayor (2026–32): Pierre Chassaing
- Area^{1}: 31.97 km^{2} (12.34 sq mi)
- Elevation: 337 m (1,106 ft)
- Population (2023): 18,820
  - Density: 588.7/km^{2} (1,525/sq mi)
- Time zone: UTC+01:00 (CET)
  - Summer (DST): UTC+02:00 (CEST)
- INSEE/Postal code: 63300 /63200
- ^{1} French Land Register data, which excludes lakes, ponds, glaciers > 1 km^{2} (0.386 sq mi or 247 acres) and river estuaries.

Riom (French pronunciation: [ʁjɔ̃]; Auvergnat: Riam) is a commune in the Puy-de-Dôme department in Auvergne in central France. It is a sub-prefecture of the department.

== History ==
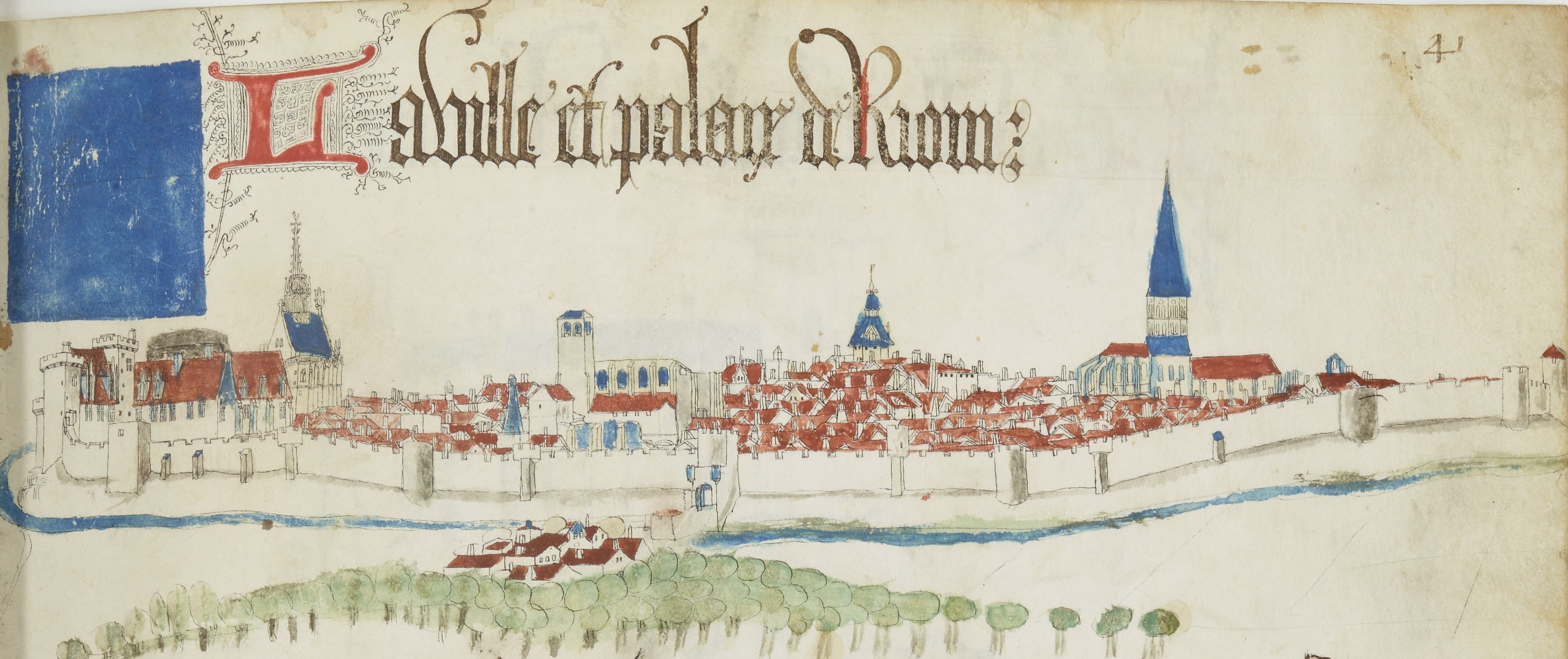
Riom in the Armorial d'Auvergne by Guillaume Revel, 15th century.

Until the French Revolution, Riom was the capital of the province of Auvergne, and the seat of the dukes of Auvergne. The city was of Gaulish origin, the Roman Ricomagus. In the intensely feudalized Auvergne of the 10th century, the town grew up around the collegiate Church of Saint Amabilis (Saint Amable), the local saint, who was the object of pilgrimages. In the 14th century the city benefitted from the patronage of Jean, duc de Berry, who rebuilt the Ducal Palace and the Saint-Chapelle. In 1531, Riom and Auvergne reverted to the Crown of France.

In 1942, Riom was the site of the Vichy government's abortive war-guilt trials, called Riom Trials.

== Population ==
Historical population
Year	Pop.	±% p.a.
1968	15,467	—
1975	17,071	+1.42%
1982	18,346	+1.03%
1990	18,793	+0.30%
1999	18,548	−0.15%
2007	18,040	−0.35%
2012	18,484	+0.49%
2017	19,180	+0.74%
2023	18,820	−0.32%
Source: INSEE

== Sights ==
In 1985 Riom received the French classification of Ville d'Art et d'Histoire recognizing its sixteen classified historical monuments as well as another 57 on the supplementary listings. Several 17th- and 18th-century private houses (hôtels particuliers) are open to the public with collections of costumes and works of decorative art.

Riom's two major public squares are Place Jean-Baptiste Laurent and Place du pré-Madame in which stand two large fountains in homage to Louis Desaix.

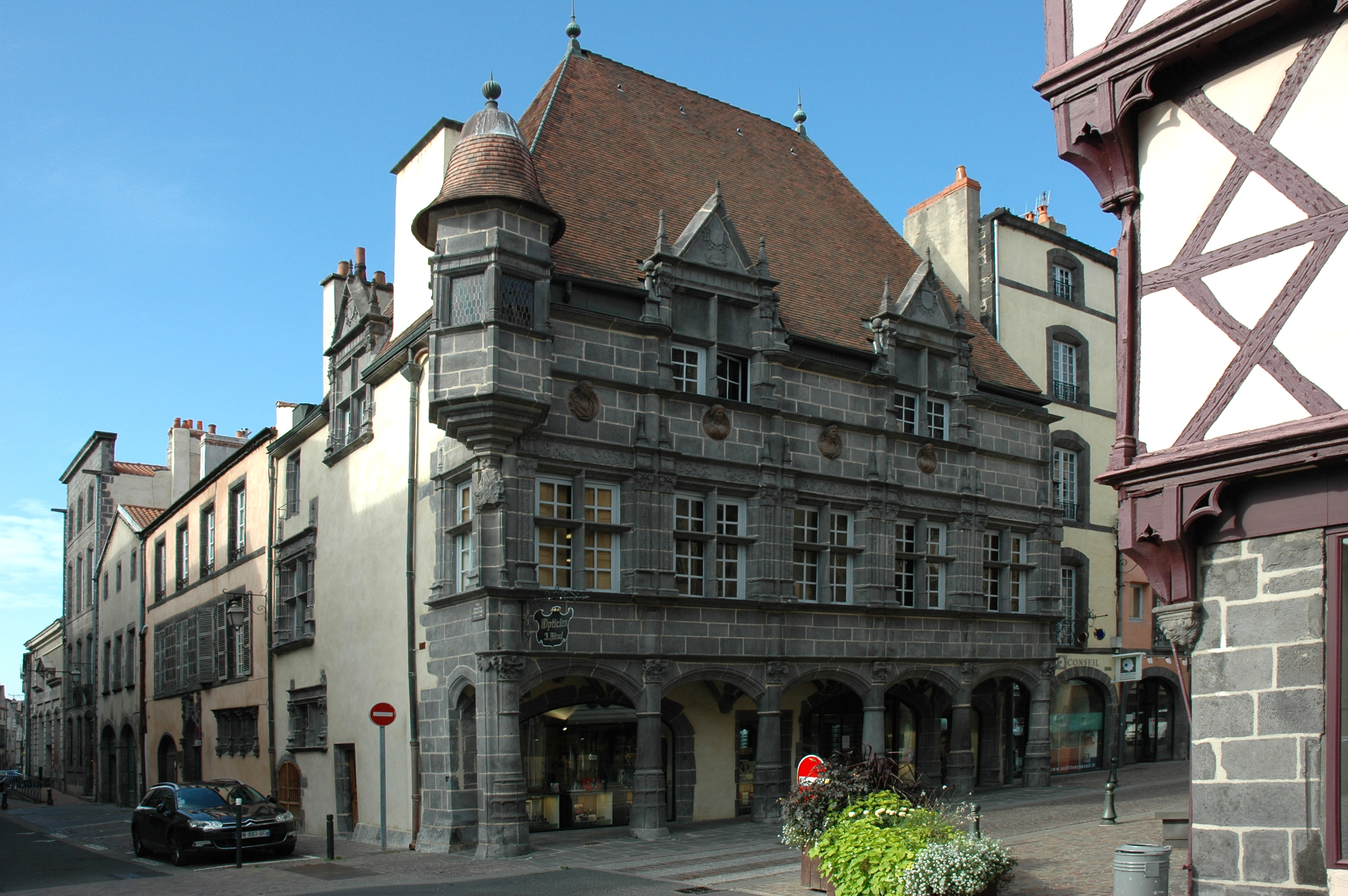
The Renaissance Maison des Consuls

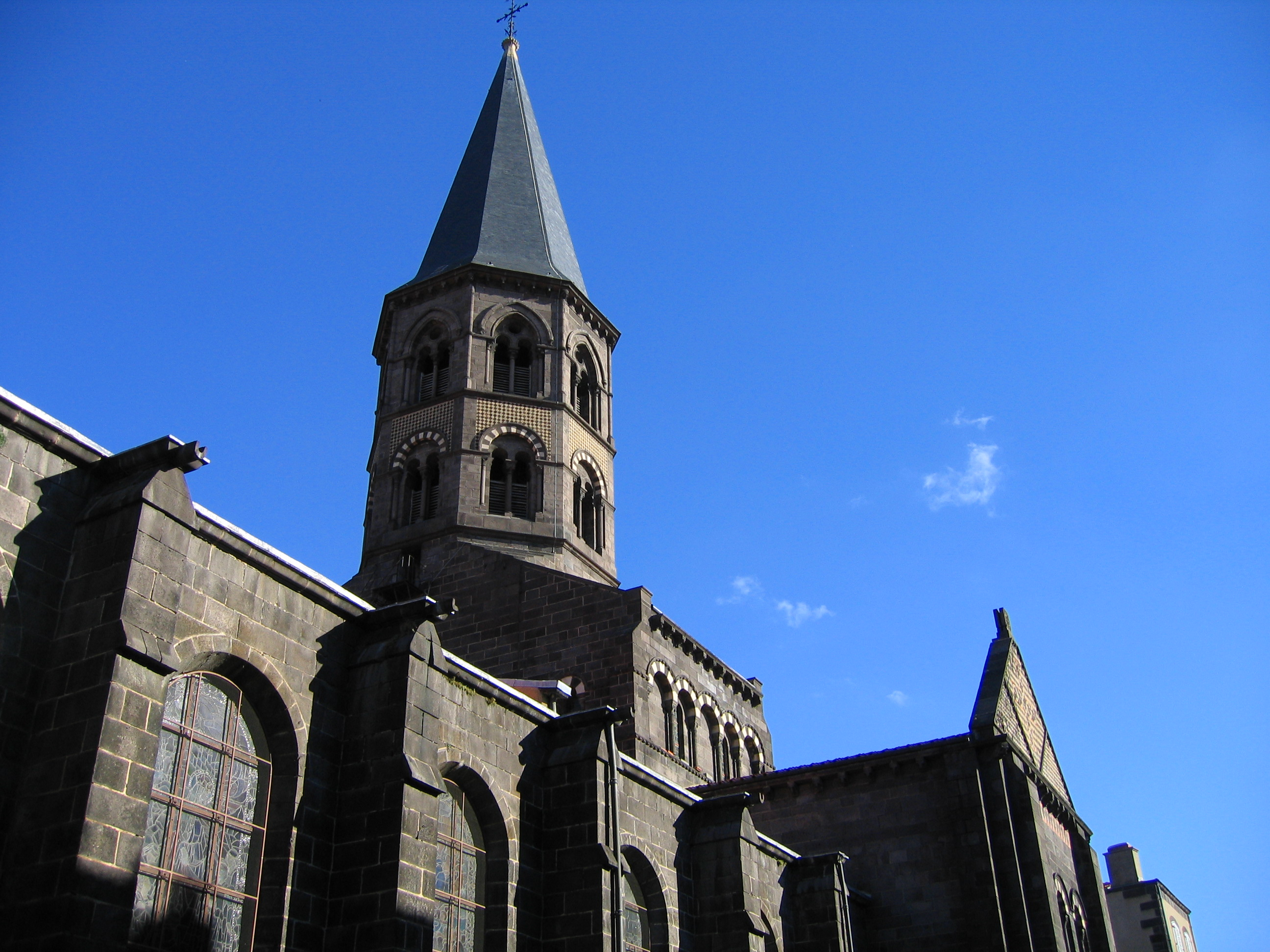
Saint Amable basilica, exterior

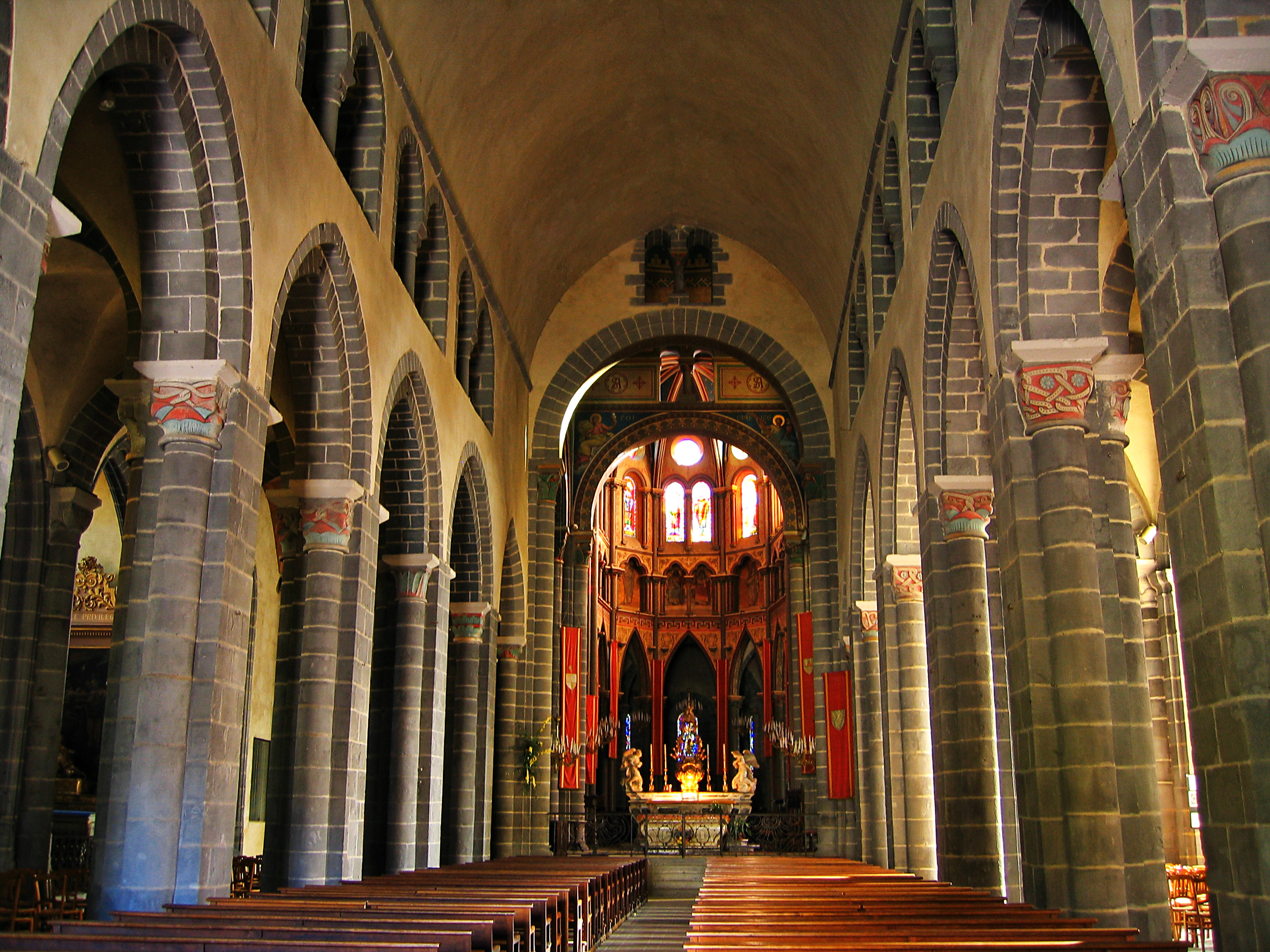
Saint Amable basilica, interior

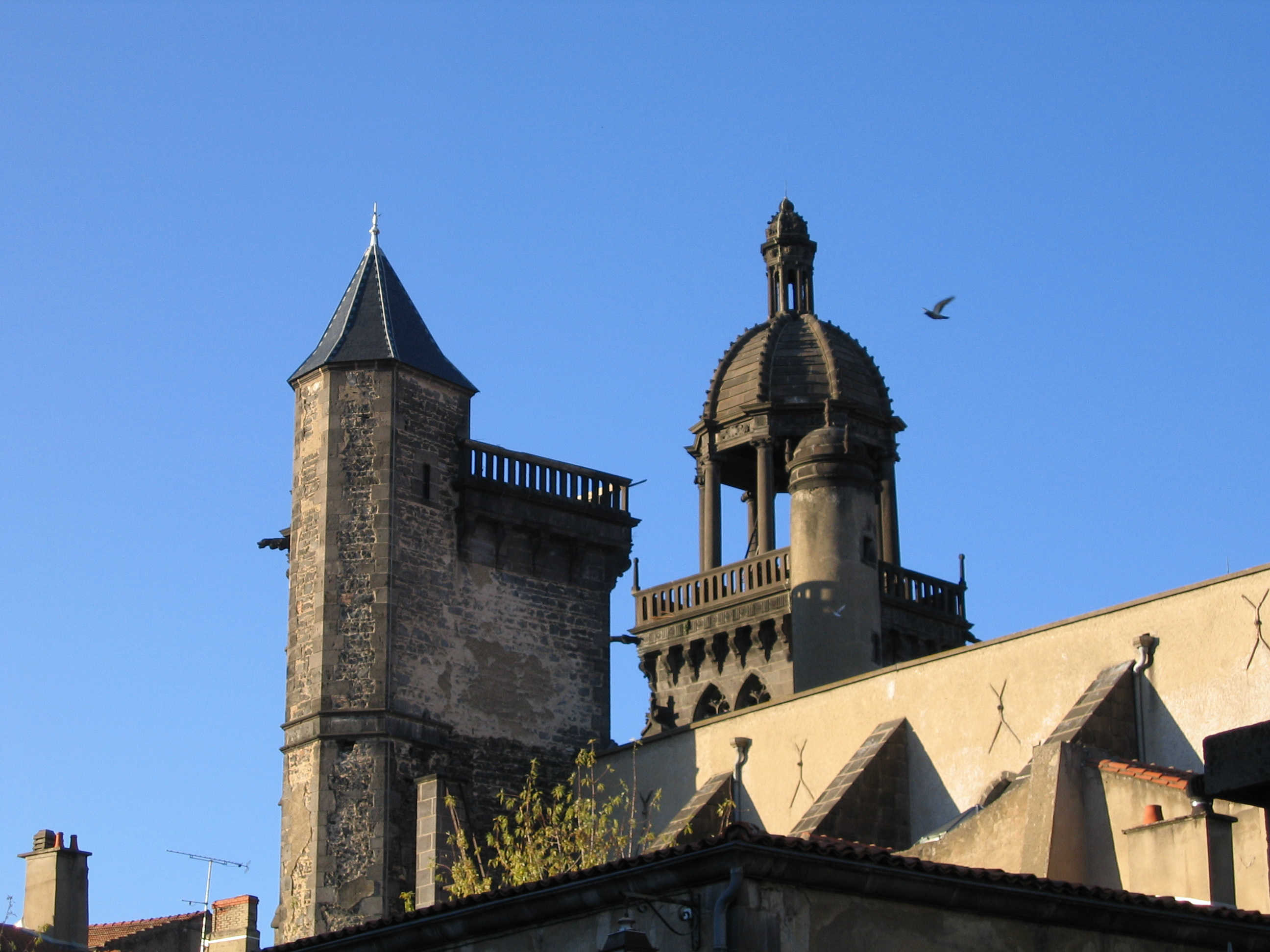
The church of Marthuret

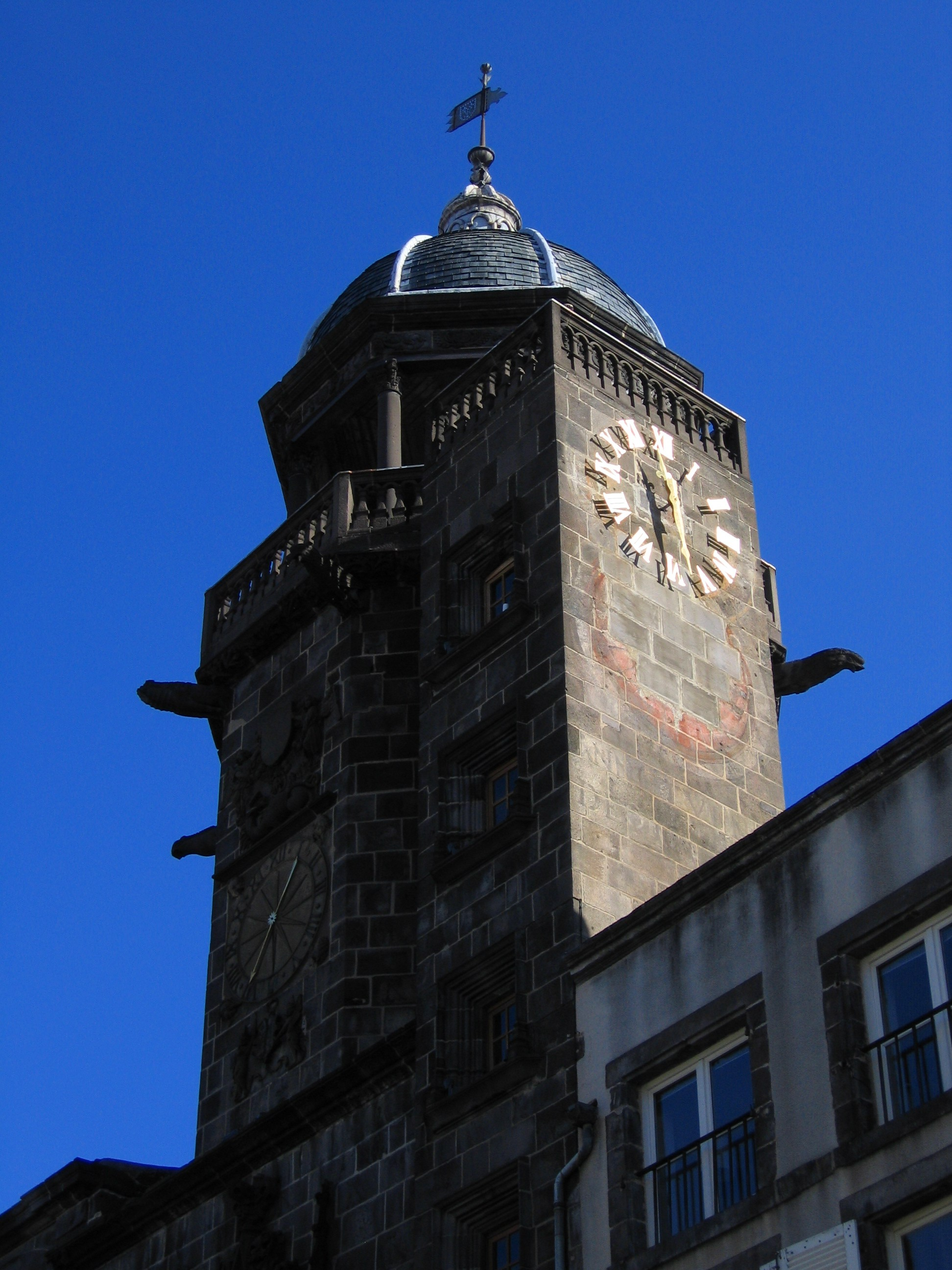
The clock tower

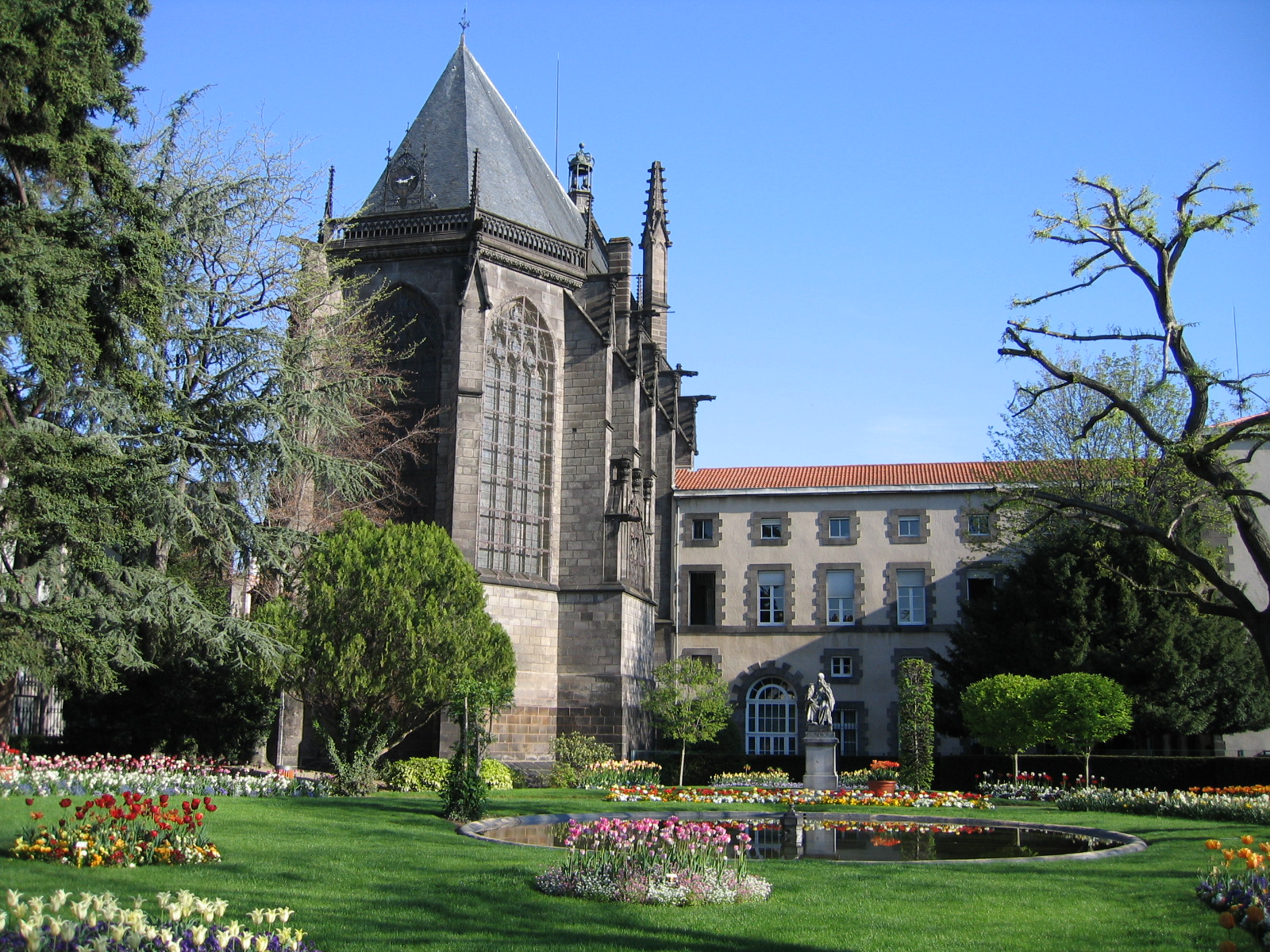
The holy chapel

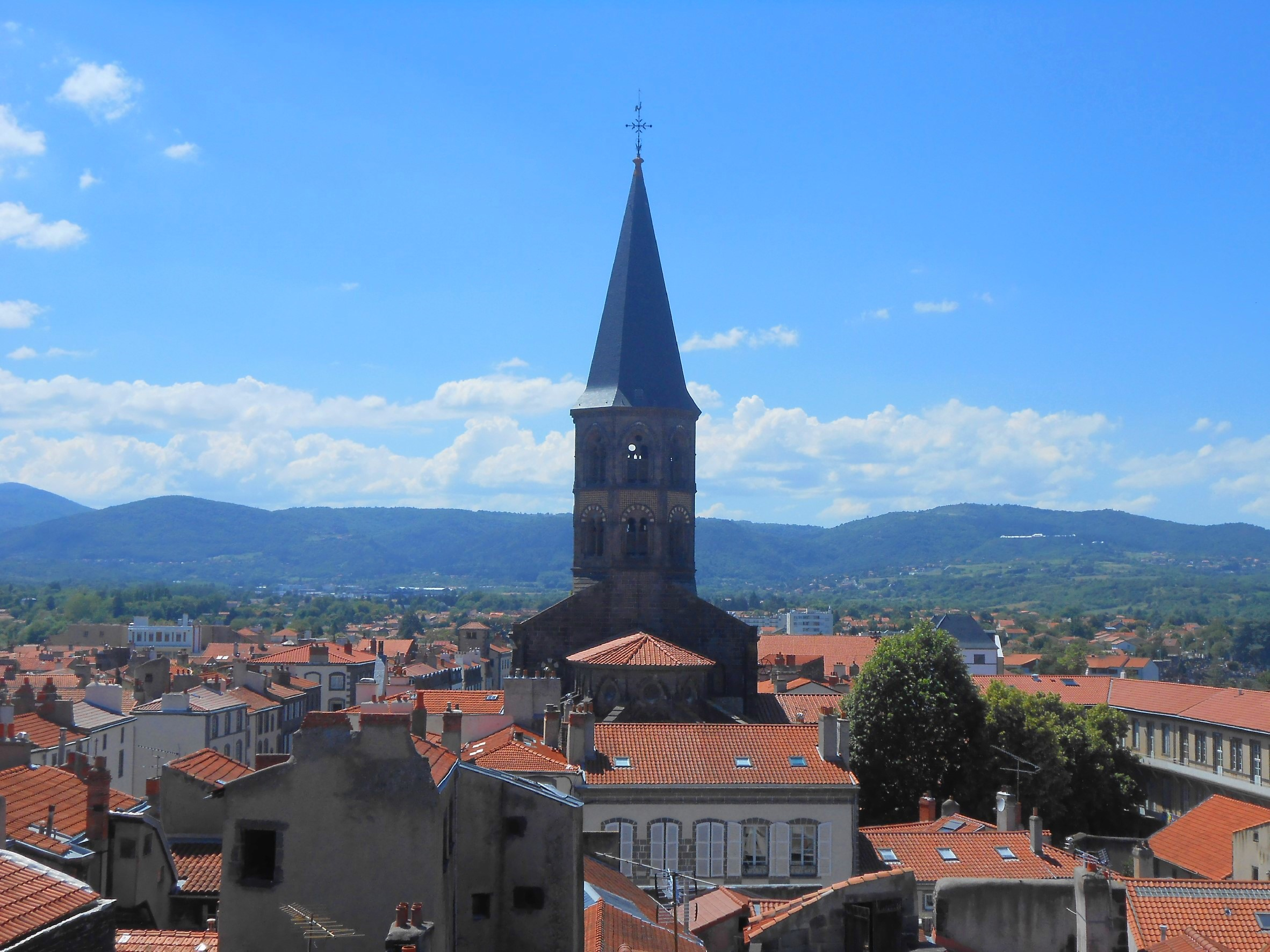
The roofs of Riom

== Public library ==
The Bibliothèque Municipale de Riom (English: Riom Library), is a public library in Riom. Since 1968 it has been located on Avenue Mgr Martrou. The library was established after the French Revolution.

The library collection began after the French Revolution and it has been housed in a number of buildings including a college and at Riom city hall. In 1905 the library was moved to a Carmelite convent building and in 1941 it was housed in a museum. The present home of the collection was opened in 1968.

It contains approximately 90,000 items (books, journals, audio cassette tapes and video). The special part of the collection consists of 15 medieval manuscripts, which came from revolutionary confiscations made in religious communities. The Ministry of Culture and Communication digitized three illuminated manuscripts. Of the illuminated works five volumes are from the 15th - 16th centuries.

== Notable people ==
Riom was the birthplace of:

- Pierre Victor, baron Malouet (1740–1814), publicist and politician
- Gilbert Romme (1750–1795), politician
- Joseph Projectus Machebeuf (1812–1889), Vicar Apostolic of Colorado and Utah; Bishop of Denver, USA
- Henri Hébrard de Villeneuve (1848–1925), Olympic fencer
- Eugene Gilbert (1889–1918), pioneer aviator, WW1 fighter pilot
- Alan Stivell (1944-), Celtic musician and singer, recording artist and master of the Celtic harp
- Rufus (1942-), actor
- Anne Marie Dias Borges (1976-), Franco-Cape-Verdean journalist and radio and television host
- Sébastien Mazeyrat (1978-), footballer

== International relations ==
Riom is twinned with:

- Adur, England, United Kingdom
- Algemesí, Spain
- Nördlingen, Germany
- Viana do Castelo, Portugal
- Żywiec, Poland

== See also ==
- Communes of the Puy-de-Dôme department
- Riom-es-Montagnes
