= Deputy governor =

A deputy governor is a gubernatorial official who has the authority after the governor, rather like a lieutenant governor.

== British colonial cases ==
In the British Empire, there were such colonial offices in:

- The two divisions of New Jersey (East Jersey and West Jersey) from 1664 to 1702 as many of the colonies' proprietors and governors remained in England and delegated administrative authority to deputies who resided in the colony.
- Delaware, while it was part of the province of Pennsylvania (lower counties; till 22 November 1704), the sole incumbent (only 1691–1693) being William Markham (1635?–1704)
- Montserrat since the start in 1632, first under the Governor of Antigua, then 1667–1816 while the island was part of the Leeward Islands colony (governed till 1696 from Nevis, then from Saint John's on Antigua)
- Province of Pennsylvania and Delaware counties, where the position was a deputy to the proprietors, namely William Penn and his heirs, who were often absent.
- Saint Kitts and Nevis (January 1671 – 1816) while the Antillian islands (who had their own governor before and after) were part of the above Leeward Islands Colony.
- Massachusetts, while known as the Massachusetts Bay Colony, John Humphrey served as deputy governor
- Rhode Island had a position of deputy governor, dating back to when it was still a colony, until 1799, when it was renamed lieutenant governor.
- Though these cases are not truly British colonial cases, as these positions were established well after the two states have attained independence, the States of Nigeria and the Counties of Kenya have Deputy Governors elected under a running-mate system alongside the elected, executive Governors.

== Governor's deputy ==
This variation was used once, in British Kaffraria (a separate Crown colony since 1860, first under a lieutenant governor; native inhabitants Xhosa), for its last own gubernatorial official before its final (re)incorporation into the Cape Colony: 24 December 1864 – 17 April 1866 (Robert Graham).

== See also ==
- Governor-in-chief
- Governor
- Governor-General
- Lieutenant governor

== Sources ==
- WorldStatesmen- see each country
