= Governor-in-chief =

Defunct title used by colonial Governors

Governor-in-chief was a title used in the British Empire for certain colonial governors, usually where authority was held over more than one colony. The title gave way in the 19th century to that of Governor-General, although it remained in use as the formal title of the Governor of Jamaica until the mid-20th century.

== History ==
The office could be systematically vested in and cumulated with a governorship, as it was in the governors of Sierra Leone (at Freetown) the case in both periods of existence of British West Africa, 17 October 1821 – 13 January 1850 and 19 February 1866 – 24 November 1888, the other components being Gambia, the British Gold Coast (present Ghana) and, in the second period, also Lagos territory (later a colony; in present Nigeria).

On the British South Caribbean Islands, the title was vested in the Governor of Grenada (1762–1802; 1779–1784 vacant), the other components being Dominica, St. Vincent, the Grenadines and Tobago; later (1833 – 1 January 1960) all part of the even larger Windward Islands but without a title above Governor.

== See also ==
- Governor-General
- Governor
- Lieutenant-Governor
- Deputy Governor

== Sources ==
- WorldStatesmen - see every present nation; here Sierra Leone- British West Africa
