= Coat of arms of the Gambia =

Coat of arms of The Gambia
- Armiger: Republic of The Gambia
- Adopted: 18 November 1964
- Crest: Issuant from a Mount Vert, an Oil Palm Nut Tree fructed proper
- Torse: Or and Azure
- Shield: Azure, a Locar axe and a Mandinka Hoe in saltire Or, a Bordure parted per bordure Vert and Argent
- Supporters: on either side a Lion guardant proper, the dexter supporting a Locar Axe and the sinister a Mandinka Hoe, both Or
- Compartment: None
- Motto: Progress, Peace, Prosperity
- Earlier version(s): Gambia Colony and Protectorate
- Use: 1889-1965

The coat of arms of The Gambia has been in use since 18 November 1964. It depicts two lions holding an axe and hoe, supporting a shield that depicts another pair of hoe and axe, crossed. Atop the shield is set the heraldic helmet and an oil palm as a crest. At the bottom is the national motto: Progress – Peace – Prosperity. The Gambian coat of arms also appeared in the fly of the Gambian air force ensign.

== Overview ==
The two lions represent the colonial history of The Gambia as part of the British Empire. The crossed axe and hoe represent the importance of agriculture to The Gambia. They are also considered to represent the two major ethnic groups of The Gambia: the Mandinka and the Fulani. The crest, a palm tree, is also a vital national tree.

The design was created by Nicholas Potin, a government employee with the Department of Surveys, who won a national competition to design it.

== History ==
Badge of The British West Africa from 1870 to 1889

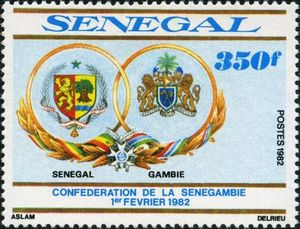
Possible Coat of Arms of The Senegambia Confederation from 1982 to 1989

== Variations ==
The Coat of arms of The Gambia Armed Forces service branches had variations:

- Coat of arms used by The Gambian Army had a crossed sword in the shield.
- Coat of arms used by The Gambian Navy had an anchor in the shield.
- Coat of arms used by The Gambian Air Force had an eagle above national coat of arms.

== See also ==
- Flag of the Gambia
