= Gambian dalasi =

Currency of The Gambia

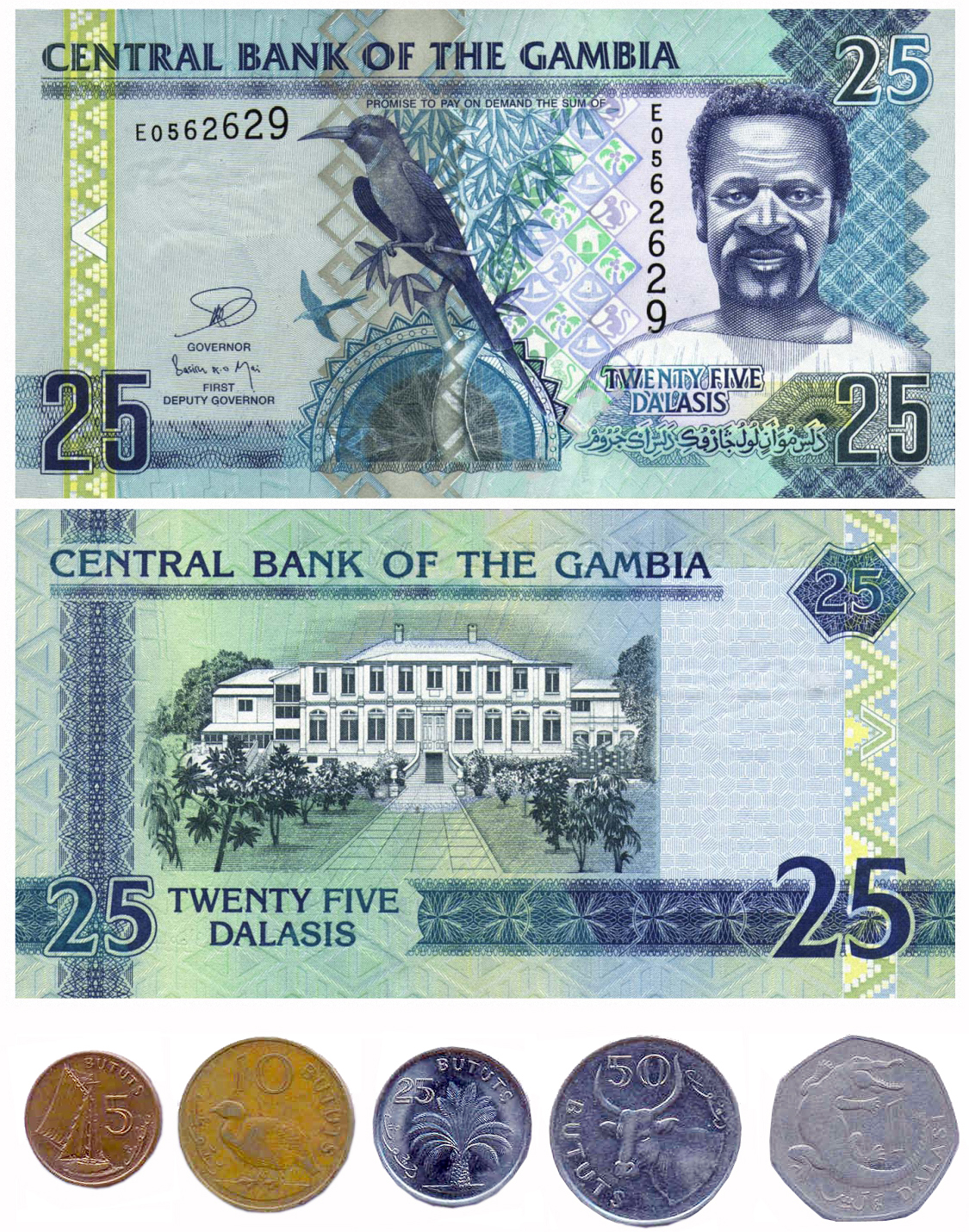
- 25 dalasi note and coins from 5 bututs to 1 dalasi

ISO 4217
- Code: GMD (numeric: 270)
- Subunit: 0.01

Units of account
- Plural: dalasis or dalasi
- Symbol: D
- Superunit
- 5: pound
- Subunit
- 1/100: butut
- Plural
- butut: bututs

Denominations
- Banknotes: 5, 10, 20, 25, 50, 100, 200 dalasis
- Coins: 1, 5, 10, 25, 50 bututs, 1 dalasi

Demographics
- Date of introduction: 1971
- Replaced: Gambian pound
- User(s): The Gambia

Issuance
- Central bank: Central Bank of The Gambia
- Website: www.cbg.gm

Valuation
- Inflation: 7.1%
- Source: The World Factbook, 2019 est.

The dalasi is the currency of The Gambia that was adopted in 1971. One dalasi is divided into one hundred bututs.

== History ==
The dalasi is subdivided into 100 bututs. It replaced the Gambian pound at a rate of 1 pound per 5 dalasis, i.e. 1 dalasi equalling 0.2 pound or 4 shillings.

=== Etymology ===
The derivative of dala is unknown. In numerous languages in the Francophonie, currency terms (including batut, dalasi, doromi, teemer) refer to the former 5 French West African franc note (the lowest denomination at the time), but to which the origins are not known. One speculated origin is a pronunciation of "dollar"; however, variants of dalasi in other Mandinka dialects (such as daasi) counter this speculation while butut is from Wolof butuut, "small thing".

== Coins ==
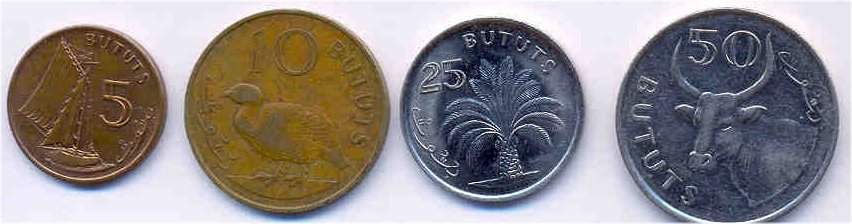
5, 10, 25, 50 bututs coins

In 1971, coins in denominations of 1, 5, 10, 25 and 50 bututs and 1 dalasi were introduced. The 1 and 5 bututs were struck in bronze while the 10 bututs were brass and the 25, 50 bututs and 1 dalasi were cupro-nickel. The reverse designs of the three higher denominations were taken from the corresponding denominations of the previous currency (1, 2 and 4 shillings), with the reverse designs for the lower three coins coming from the 6, 1 and 3 pence coins, respectively. All coins of this series depict former president, Sir Dawda Jawara.

New 1 dalasi coins were introduced in 1987, modeled on the 50 pence coin of the United Kingdom. These replaced the larger, round dalasi coins which never saw its widespread use as the lower denominations.

In 1998, a new coin series was introduced, in which the effigy of Sir Dawda Jawara was dropped and replaced with the national coat of arms on the obverses. However, older Jawara-era coins still commonly circulate as legal tender. The 1 dalasi coin was also downsized in size and mass, but none of the other coins were changed. Only 25 and 50 bututs and 1 dalasi coins are currently in circulation, they are of the 1998 issue which also included 1, 5 and 10 bututs coins but have since disappeared due to their low value.

As of 7 March 2026 the mid-market rate (value) of the dalasi was 73.45 per US dollar. All of their previous currency (notes and coins) are still legal to use. However the reduced value of the dalasi has made the 1b, 5b, and 10b coins of little use. The 25b and 50b are of limited use as prices tend to be set in dalasi. The 1 dalasi coin is still in use to make change for the 5 dalasi (ten cents) banknote.

== Banknotes ==
Banknotes currently in circulation are 5, 10, 20, 25, 50, 100 and 200 dalasis. 1 dalasi notes were issued between 1971 and 1987. New banknotes were first issued on 27 July 1996, then reprinted in 2001. On 27 July 2006, the Central Bank of The Gambia issued a new series of notes with images similar to the preceding issues, but with improvements in their designs, paper thickness, and security features. Most noticeably, the old white borders have been removed, giving the notes full printing of its main colours. Furthermore, the 5 and 10 dalasis are coated with a special varnish to extend circulation life. Finally, the security features of the 100 dalasis have been upgraded by the inclusion of a silver foil on the front of the note with the image of 100 embossed into the foil.

A polymer commemorative 20 Dalasis was also put into circulation to commemorate 20 years of then-President Yahya Jammeh's rule.

On 15 April 2015, the Central Bank of The Gambia released a new family of banknotes that includes two new denominations, a 20 dalasis note to replace the 25 dalasis and a 200 dalasis note, twice the value of the previously highest denomination. All of the notes feature a portrait of Yahya Jammeh.

In February 2018, a new series of banknotes believed to be a reprinting of the 2006–2013 issues, but with a new signature combination, was released as an interim measure to replace those with the portrait of Yahya Jammeh.

A whole new series was released during August 2019.

Banknotes of the Gambian dalasi (2006-2013 "Full Printing" issues)
Image		Value	Main Colour	Description		Date of issue
Obverse	Reverse	Value	Main Colour	Obverse	Reverse	Date of issue
		5 dalasis	Red	Giant kingfisher; girl	Cattle	2006
		10 dalasis	Green	Sacred ibis; boy	Central Bank of The Gambia headquarters, Banjul	2006
		25 dalasis	Blue	Northern carmine bee-eater; man	State House, Banjul	2006
		50 dalasis	Light purple	Eurasian hoopoes; woman	Wassu stone circles	2006
		100 dalasis	Cyan	Senegal parrot, old man	Arch 22 monument, Banjul	2006

=== The "Yahya Jammeh" issue (2015) ===
Banknotes of the Gambian dalasi (2015 "Yahya Jammeh" issue)
Image		Value	Main Colour	Description		Date of issue
Obverse	Reverse	Value	Main Colour	Obverse	Reverse	Date of issue
		5 dalasis	Red	Giant kingfisher; President Yahya Jammeh	Cattle	2015
		10 dalasis	Green	Sacred ibis; President Yahya Jammeh	Central Bank of The Gambia headquarters, Banjul	2015
		20 dalasis	Blue	Northern carmine bee-eater; President Yahya Jammeh	State House, Banjul	2015
		50 dalasis	Light purple	Hoopoe birds; President Yahya Jammeh	Wassu stone circles	2015
		100 dalasis	Cyan	Senegal parrot, President Yahya Jammeh	Arch 22 monument, Banjul	2015
		200 dalasis	Light brown	President Yahya Jammeh	Banjul International Airport	2015

=== The “Beautifully Gambian” series (2019) ===
On 6 August 2019 a new family of banknotes was released. These notes were intended to gradually replace older notes depicting Yahya Jammeh.

Banknotes of the Gambian dalasi (2019 "Birds" issues)
Image		Value	Main Colour	Description		Date of issue
Obverse	Reverse	Value	Main Colour	Obverse	Reverse	Date of issue
		5 dalasis	Red	Giant kingfisher; Coat of arms of the Gambia	Cattle	2019
		10 dalasis	Green	Vinaceous Dove; Coat of arms of the Gambia	Ferry "Kinta Kinteh"	2019
		20 dalasis	Blue	Northern Grey-headed Sparrow; Coat of arms of the Gambia	Agricultural machine	2019
		50 dalasis	Purple	African Eagle Hawk; Coat of arms of the Gambia	Wassu stone circles	2019
		100 dalasis	Cyan	Black crowned cranes; Coat of arms of the Gambia	Fishermen	2019
		200 dalasis	Orange	Double-spurred spurfowl; Coat of arms of the Gambia	Rice planting	2019

=== Commemorative banknotes ===
- 1 Dalasi (1978) - opening of the Central Bank of The Gambia's building in Banjul by President Sir Dawda Jawara.
- 20 Dalasis (2014) - 20 Years of Progress and Self-Reliance under the dictatorship of Yahya Jammeh.

== Exchange rates ==
Current GMD exchange rates
From Google Finance:	AUD CAD CHF CNY EUR GBP HKD JPY USD INR XOF
From Yahoo! Finance:	AUD CAD CHF CNY EUR GBP HKD JPY USD INR XOF
From XE.com:	AUD CAD CHF CNY EUR GBP HKD JPY USD INR XOF
From OANDA:	AUD CAD CHF CNY EUR GBP HKD JPY USD INR XOF

== See also ==
- Economy of The Gambia
