= British West African pound =

Historical currency

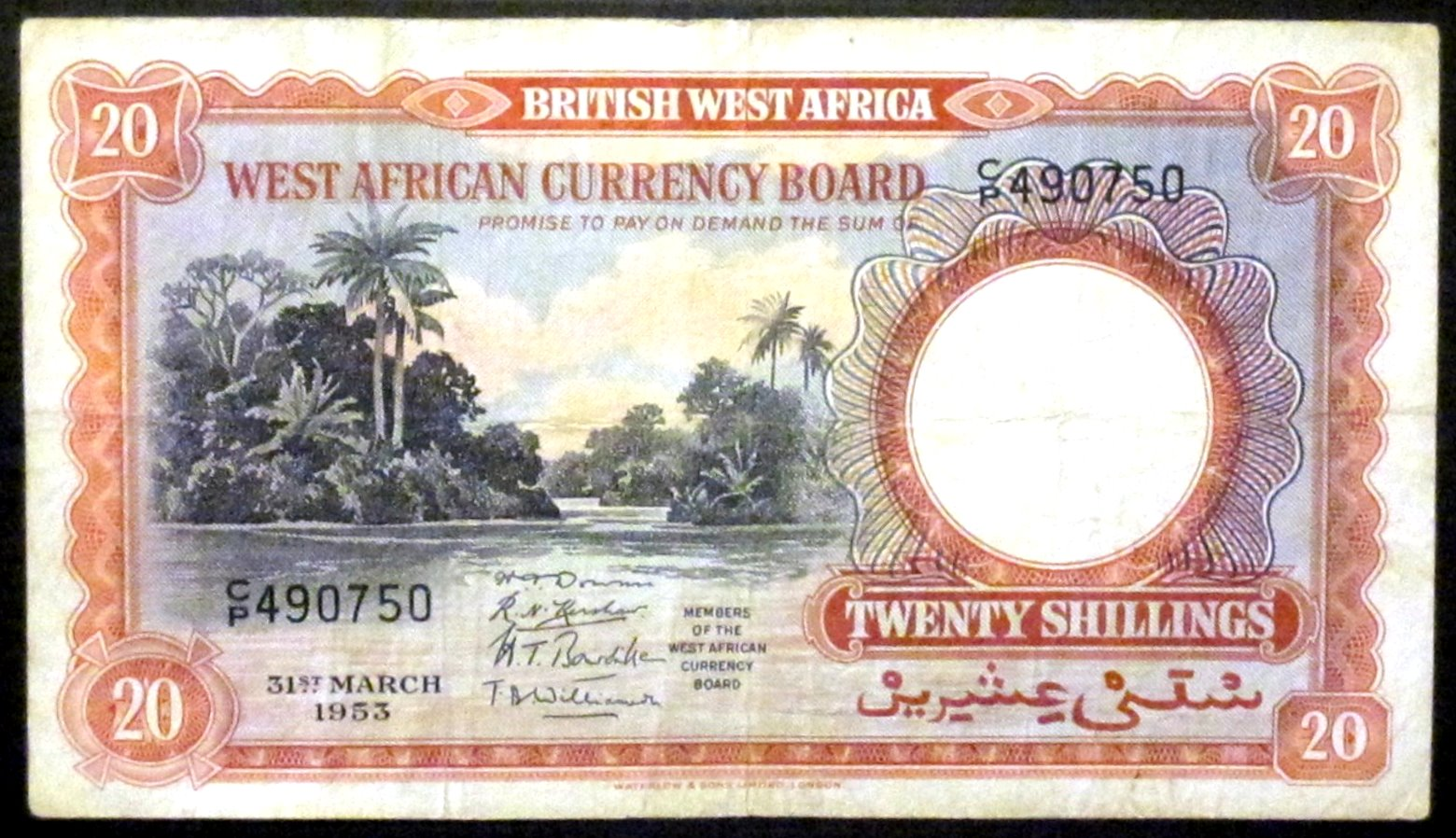
A 1953 20/– (£1) note of the West African Currency Board.

The pound was the currency of British West Africa, a group of British colonies, protectorates and mandate territories. It was equal to one pound sterling and was similarly subdivided into 20 shillings, each of 12 pence. It was issued from 1912 to 1965 by the West African Currency Board.

== History ==
In the 19th century, the pound sterling became the currency of the British West African territories, and standard issue British coinage circulated. The West African territories in question were Nigeria, the Gold Coast (now Ghana), Sierra Leone and the Gambia.

A distinctive set of sterling coinage for use in British West Africa was authorized by a series of Orders in Council beginning with the Nigeria Coinage Order, 1906, and in 1912, the authorities in London set up the West African Currency Board. The circumstance prompting this move was a tendency for standard sterling coins shipped to the West African territories to leave the region and return to circulation in the UK, causing a local dearth of coinage. A unique British West African variety of sterling coinage would not be accepted in the shops of Britain and so would remain in circulation locally.

In 1910, Australia commenced issuing its own distinctive varieties of sterling coinage, but the reasons for doing so were quite different from those relating to British West Africa. Australian authorities issued local coinage as a step towards introducing a separate currency with a flexible exchange rate against sterling, while no such plan was considered for British West Africa. With the exception of Jamaica where special low denomination coins were issued in place of the British copper coins, due to local superstitions surrounding the use of copper coinage for church collections, authorities in London did not replace any sterling coins with local issues for any other British colony.

The British West African pound was also adopted by Liberia in 1907, replacing the Liberian dollar, although it was not served by the West African Currency Board. Liberia changed to the US dollar in 1943. Togo and Cameroon adopted the West African currency in 1914 and 1916 respectively when British and French troops took over those colonies from Germany as part of World War I.

Beginning in 1958, the British West African pound was replaced by local currencies in the individual territories. The replacements were:

Country	Date	New; Currency	Conversion Rate; From BWA pound
Nigeria	1958	Nigerian pound	1
British Cameroons	1958	Nigerian pound	1
Ghana	1958	Ghanaian pound	1
British Cameroons - Southern	1961	CFA franc (BEAC)	700
Sierra Leone	1964	Leone	2
Gambia	1965	Gambian pound	1

== Coins ==
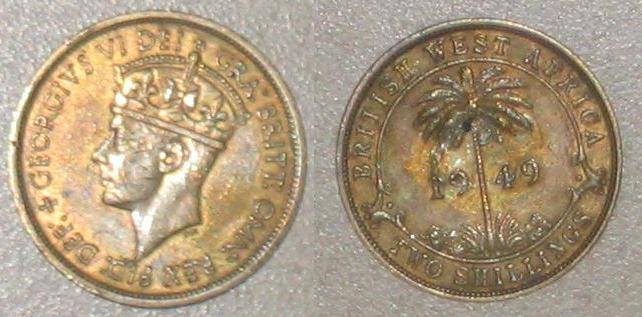
Two shilling coin from 1949

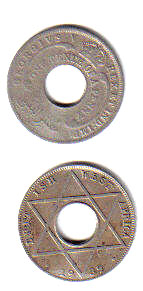
1/10d coins of British West Africa, dated 1936 and 1939.

In 1907, aluminium 1/10d and cupro-nickel 1d coins were introduced. Both coins were holed. In 1908, cupro-nickel replaced aluminium in the 1/10d and, in 1911, holed, cupro-nickel 1/2d coins were introduced. In 1913, silver 3d and 6d, 1/– and 2/– were introduced. In 1920, brass replaced silver in these denominations.

In 1938, larger, cupro-nickel 3d coins were introduced, with nickel-brass replacing brass in the higher denominations. In 1952, bronze replaced cupro-nickel in the 1/10d, 1/2d and 1d coins. The last coins of British West Africa were struck in 1958.

== Banknotes ==
In 1916, the West African Currency Board introduced notes for 2/–, 10/–, and 20/– (£1), followed by 1/– notes in 1918. Only the 10/– and 20/– notes were issued after 1918 until 100/– (£5) notes were introduced in 1953. The last notes were produced in 1962.

== See also ==
- Biafran pound
- British currency in Oceania
- British currency in the Middle East
- British currency in the South Atlantic and the Antarctic
- Gambian pound
- Ghanaian pound
- Gold Coast ackey
- Nigerian pound
- West African Monetary Zone
- Economic Community of West African States

== References and sources ==
Sources

- Krause, Chester L.; Clifford Mishler (1991). Standard Catalog of World Coins: 1801–1991 (18th ed.). Krause Publications. ISBN 0873411501.
- Pick, Albert (1994). Bruce, Colin R. II; Shafer, Neil (eds.). Standard Catalog of World Paper Money: General Issues (7th ed.). Krause Publications. ISBN 0-87341-207-9.
