= Ghanaian pound =

Currency of Ghana

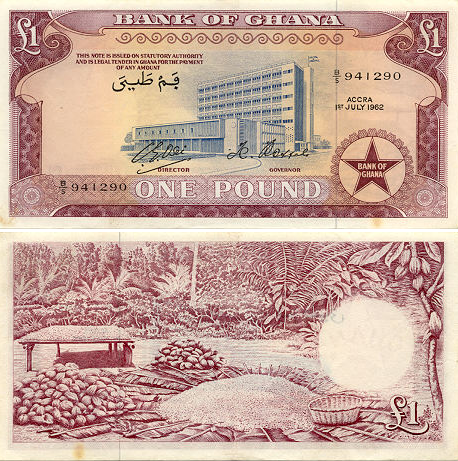
Obverse and reverse of £1 banknote
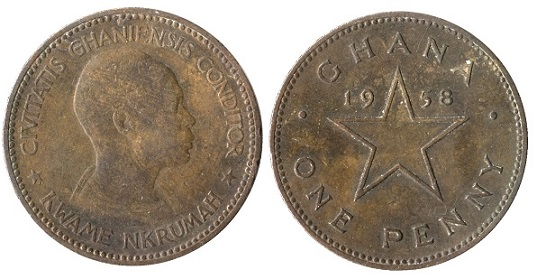
Obverse and reverse of 1d coin

Unit
- Plural: pounds
- Symbol: £

Denominations
- Subunit
- 1/240: penny
- 1/20: shilling
- Plural
- penny: pence
- shilling: shillings
- Symbol
- penny: d
- shilling: s. or /–
- Banknotes: 10/-, £1, £5, £1,000
- Coins: 1/2d, 1d, 3d, 6d, 1/–, 2/–

Demographics
- Date of introduction: 1958
- Replaced: British West African pound (at par)
- Date of withdrawal: 1965
- Replaced by: Ghanaian cedi (£1 = ₵2.40)
- User(s): Ghana
- This infobox shows the latest status before this currency was rendered obsolete.

The pound was the currency of Ghana between 1958 and 1965. It was subdivided into 20 shillings, each of 12 pence. Until 1958, Ghana used the British West African pound, after which it issued its own currency. In 1965, Ghana introduced the first cedi at a rate of £1 = ₵2.40, i.e., ₵1 = 100d.

== Coins ==
In 1958, bronze coins were issued for 1/2d and 1d, along with cupro-nickel 3d and 6d, 1/– and 2/–. The 3d coin was scalloped in shape.

Ghanaian pound (Legal tender: 1958-65)
Image	Value	Description						Date of issue
Obverse & Reverse	Value	Obverse	Reverse	Metal	Weight	Diameter	Edge	Date of issue
	1/2d	Kwame Nkrumah (Lettering:); CIVITATIS GHANIENSIS CONDITOR (the Founder of Ghana); KWAME NKRUMAH	Five-pointed star (Lettering:); GHANA 1958 & The value of the coin	Bronze	2.9 g	21 mm	Smooth	1 July 1958
	1d	Kwame Nkrumah (Lettering:); CIVITATIS GHANIENSIS CONDITOR (the Founder of Ghana); KWAME NKRUMAH	Five-pointed star (Lettering:); GHANA 1958 & The value of the coin	Bronze	5.7 g	25.5 mm	Plain	1 July 1958
	3d	Kwame Nkrumah (Lettering:); CIVITATIS GHANIENSIS CONDITOR (the Founder of Ghana); KWAME NKRUMAH	Five-pointed star (Lettering:); GHANA 1958 & The value of the coin	Copper/Nickel	3.3 g	19.5 mm	Plain	1 July 1958
	6d	Kwame Nkrumah (Lettering:); CIVITATIS GHANIENSIS CONDITOR (the Founder of Ghana); KWAME NKRUMAH	Five-pointed star (Lettering:); GHANA 1958 & The value of the coin	Copper/Nickel	2.2 g	16.5 mm	Plain	1 July 1958
	1/–	Kwame Nkrumah (Lettering:); CIVITATIS GHANIENSIS CONDITOR (the Founder of Ghana); KWAME NKRUMAH	Five-pointed star (Lettering:); GHANA 1958 & The value of the coin	Copper/Nickel	4.5 g	21 mm	Reeded	1 July 1958
	2/–	Kwame Nkrumah (Lettering:); CIVITATIS GHANIENSIS CONDITOR (the Founder of Ghana); KWAME NKRUMAH	Five-pointed star (Lettering:); GHANA 1958 & The value of the coin	Copper/Nickel	8.9 g	26.5 mm	Reeded	1 July 1958

== Banknotes ==
In 1958, banknotes were introduced in denominations of 10/–, £1 and £5. The £1 and £5 notes were produced until 1962 and the 10/– note was produced until 1963.

Ghanaian pound (Legal tender: 1958-67)
Image	Value	Description		Years of issue
Obverse & Reverse	Value	Obverse	Reverse	Years of issue
	10/–	Bank of Ghana	Star	1958-1963
	£1	Bank of Ghana	Cocao	1958-1962
	£5	Bank of Ghana	Cargo ships and logs	1958-1962
	£1,000 (Only used in Interbanking Transactions)	Bank of Ghana	Art pattern	1958

== See also ==
- Economy of Ghana

Preceded by: British West African pound Reason: independence (in 1957)	Currency of Ghana; 1958 – 1965	Succeeded by: First Ghanaian cedi Reason: decimalisation Ratio: 2.4 cedi = 1 pound, or 1 pesewa = 1 penny
