= Wamkele Keabetswe Mene =

African diplomat from South Africa

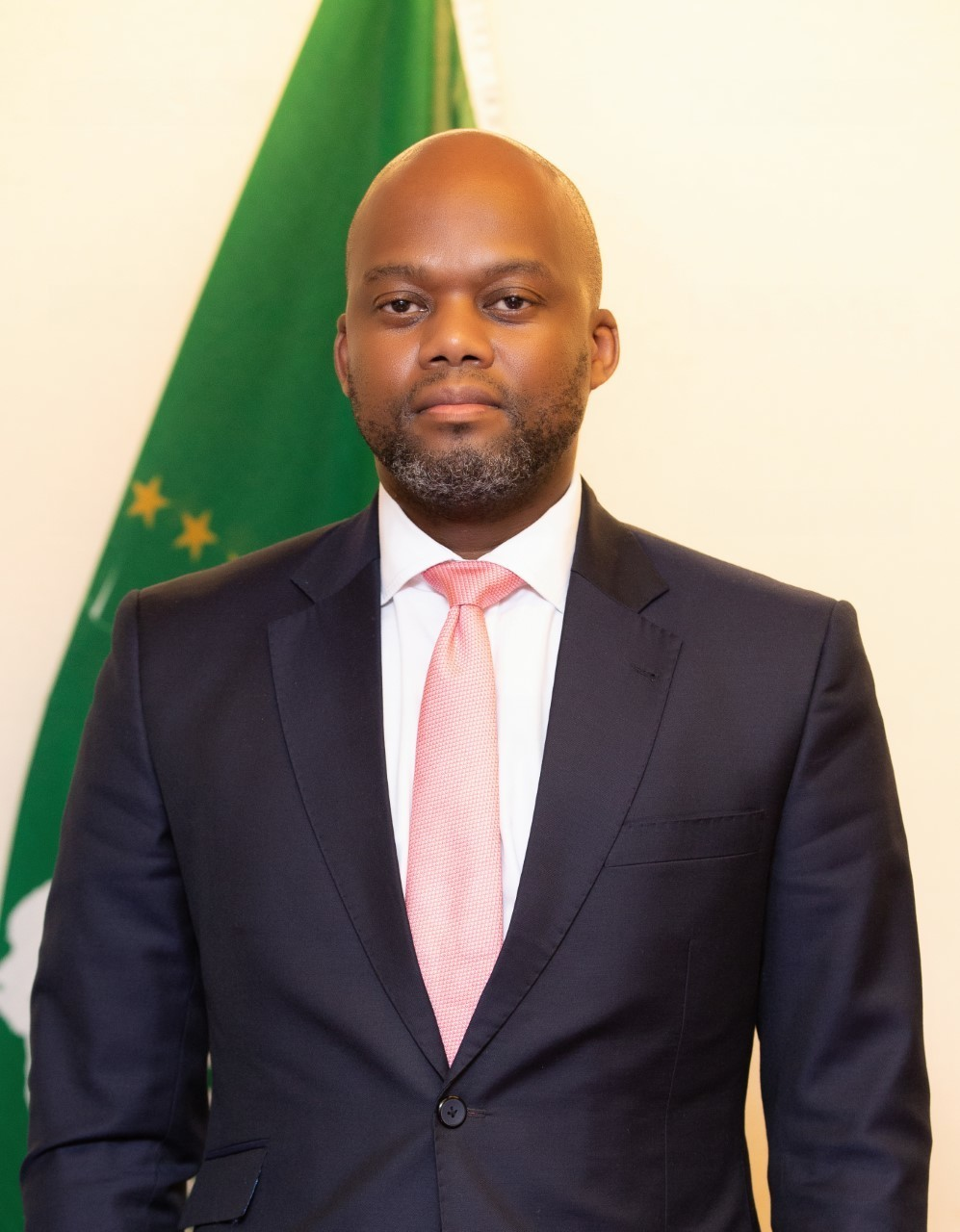
- Education: Rhodes University; London School of Economics and Political Science
- Office: 1st Secretary General of The African Continental Free Trade Area Secretariat
- Spouse: Malika Hinkson Mene

Wamkele Mene is the Secretary General of the African Continental Free Trade Area (AfCFTA) Secretariat. In February 2020, he was elected as the first Secretary General of the African Continental Free Trade Area Secretariat.

== Early life and education ==
Wamkele was born and raised in Uitenhage, Eastern Cape Province. He attended Marymount High School, before changing schools and enrolled at Trinity High School. He graduated with a B.A Law from the Rhodes University. He obtained an M.A. in International Studies and Diplomacy from the School of Oriental & African Studies and an LL.M in Banking Law and Financial Regulation from the London School of Economics and Political Science.

== Career ==
He previously served as the Head of Mission to the World Trade Organisation for South Africa. Wamkele later Chaired the Committee on International Trade in Financial Services at the World Trade Organisation. He was the Chief Director for Africa Economic Relations in South Africa's Department of Trade and Industry and South Africa's lead negotiator in the African Continental Free Trade Agreement.

== Personal life ==
Wamkele is married to Malika Hinkson Mene.
