= Board of Commissioners of Currency of Ceylon =

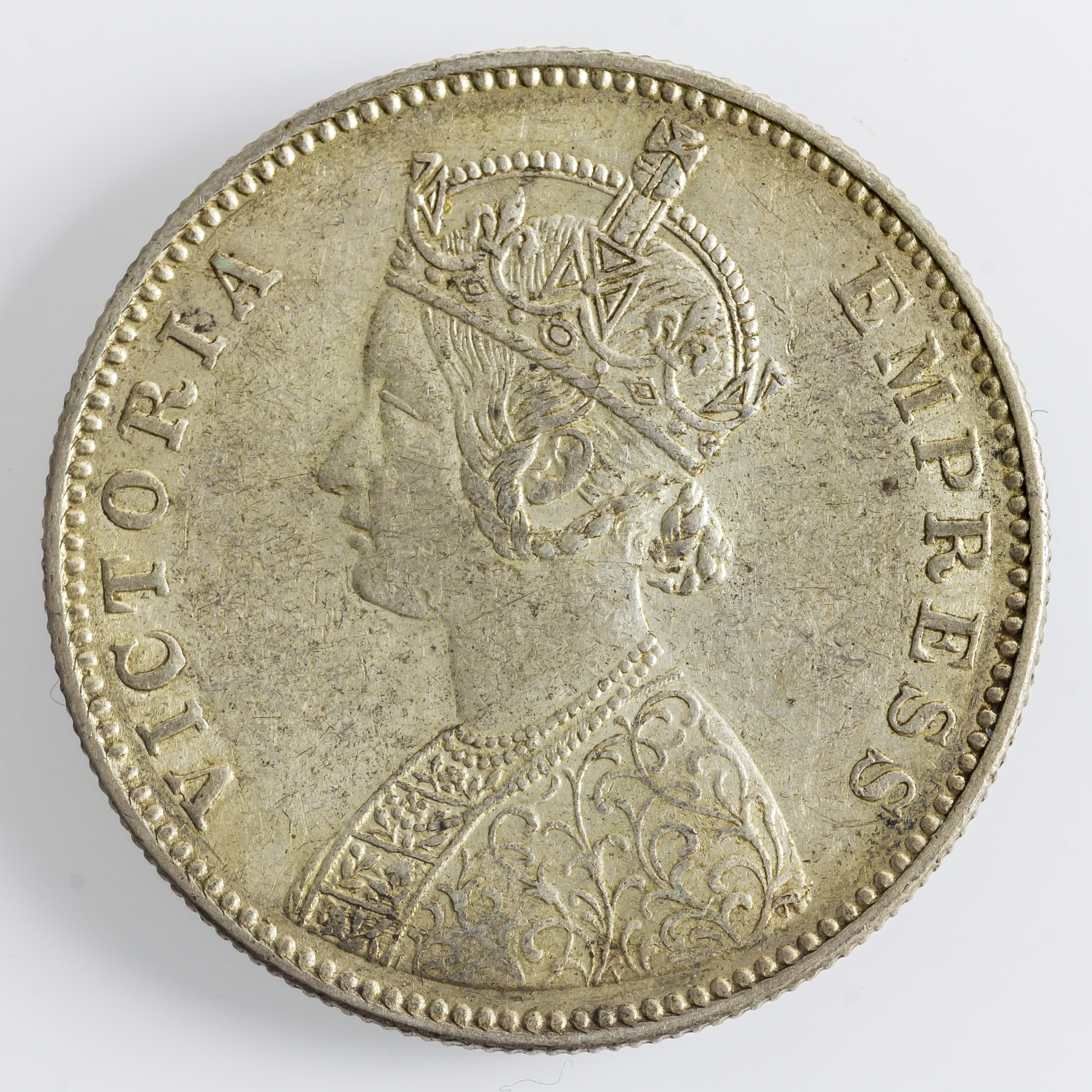
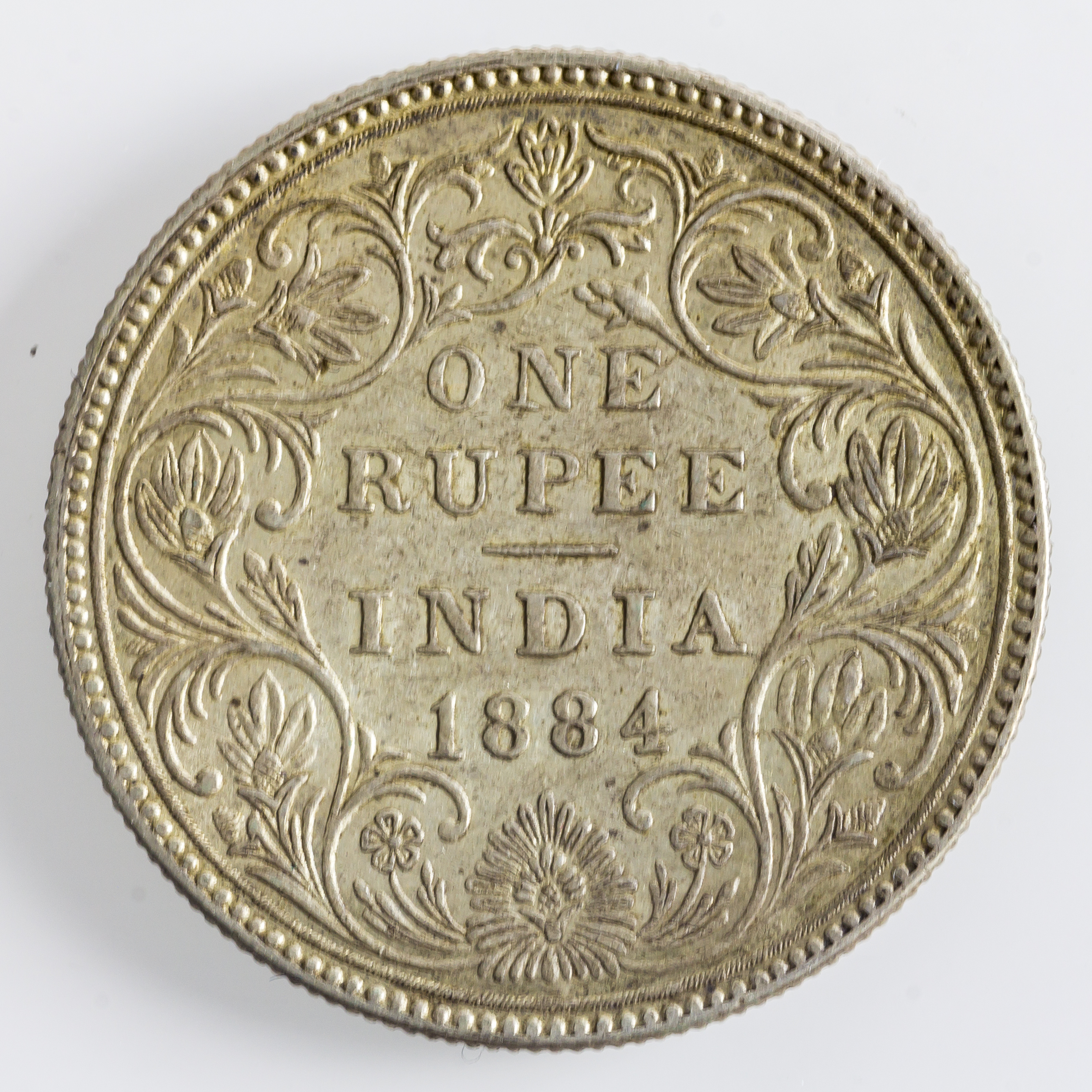
Indian rupee coin minted in 1884 and made of 91.7% silver.

The Board of Commissioners of Currency of Ceylon was the currency board of the crown colony of Ceylon which functioned from 1884 to 1950, when its functions were transferred to the Monitory Board of the Central Bank of Ceylon. It was established under the Paper Currency Ordinance of 1884 following the 1884 Ceylonese banking and monetary crisis. The currency board issued currency notes in exchange of Indian silver rupee, ensuring a 100% reserve, taking over the issuing of bank notes from the local exchange banks. The Board of Commissioners consisted of the Colonial Secretary of Ceylon, the Treasurer of Ceylon, and the Auditor-General of Ceylon.
