= British West Africa =

1821–1888 colonial entity of Britain in West Africa

British West African Settlements
- 1821–1850; 1866–1888
- Flag Badge
- Anthem: God Save the King (1821–1837); God Save the Queen (1837–1850; 1866–1888)
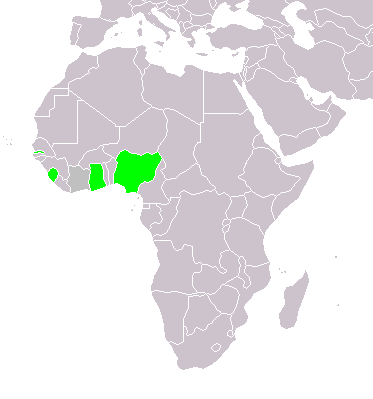
- Location of British West Africa. From left to right: The Gambia, Sierra Leone, Gold Coast and Nigeria.
- Status: Crown colony
- Capital: Freetown
- Common languages: English (official)
- Monarch
  - 1821–1830: George IV (first)
  - 1837–1850; 1866–1888: Victoria (last)
- Historical era: Abolitionism; New Imperialism
  - Established: 17 October 1821
  - Disestablishment: 13 January 1850
  - Second establishment: 19 February 1866
  - Final disestablishment: 28 November 1888
- Currency: Pound sterling British West African pound
Succeeded by
Gambia Colony and Protectorate
Gold Coast (British colony)
Oil Rivers Protectorate
Sierra Leone Colony and Protectorate
- Today part of: The Gambia; Ghana; Nigeria; Sierra Leone; Cameroon

British West Africa was the collective name for British settlements in West Africa during the colonial period, either in the general geographical sense or the formal colonial administrative entity. British West Africa as a colonial entity was originally officially known as Colony of Sierra Leone and its Dependencies, then British West African Territories and finally British West African Settlements.

The United Kingdom held varying parts of these territories or the whole throughout the 19th century. From west to east, the colonies became the independent countries of The Gambia, Sierra Leone, Ghana and Nigeria. Until independence, Ghana was referred to as the Gold Coast.

== Historical jurisdiction ==
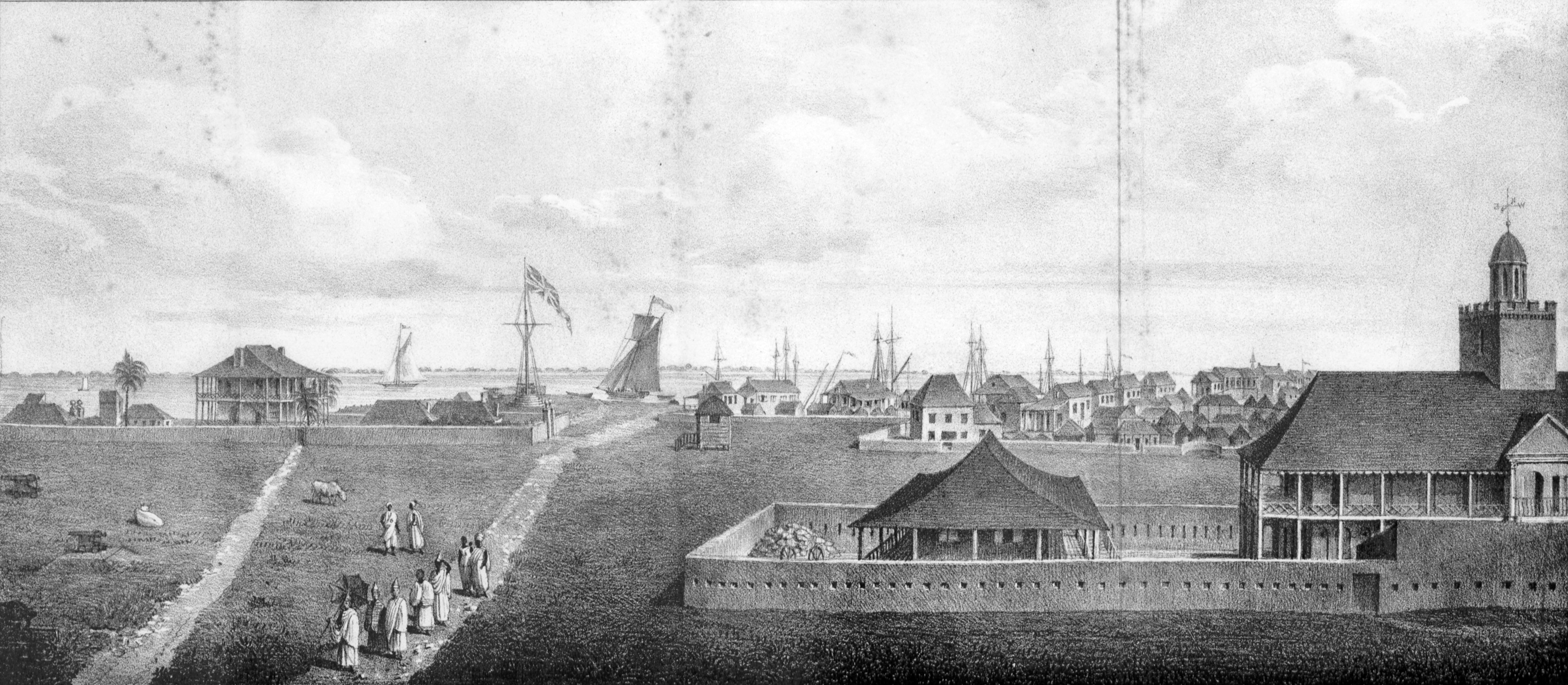
A sketch of the town of Bathurst, The Gambia, published in 1824

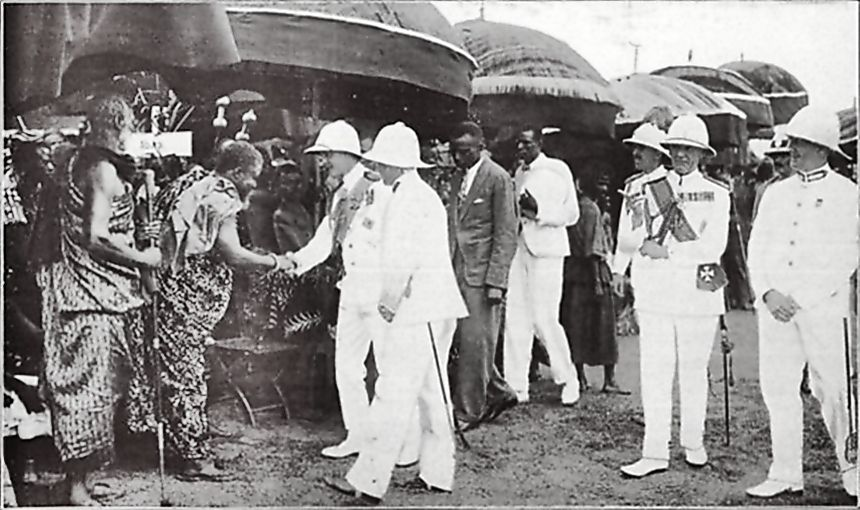
Otoo Ababio II., Omanhene of Abura, being presented to Prince of Wales, Accra, Gold Coast, 1925

British West Africa constituted during two periods (17 October 1821, until its first dissolution on 13 January 1850, and again 19 February 1866, until its final demise on 28 November 1888) as an administrative entity under a governor-in-chief (comparable in rank to a governor-general), an office vested in the governor of Sierra Leone based in Freetown.

The other colonies originally included in the jurisdiction were the Gambia, the British Gold Coast (modern Ghana), as well as the western, eastern, and northern parts of modern Nigeria.

British West Africa's present makeup includes Ghana, Sierra Leone, The Gambia, Western Nigeria, Eastern Nigeria and Northern Nigeria. These countries and areas are artifacts of the post-colonial period, or what the Ghanaian writer Kwame Appiah dubs neo-colonialism.

British West Africa was originally founded at the urging of the prominent abolitionist Fowell Buxton, who felt that ending the Atlantic slave trade required some level of British control of the coastline. Development was solely based on modernization, and autonomous educational systems were the first step to modernising indigenous culture. Cultures and interests of indigenous peoples were ignored. A new social order, as well as European influences within schools and libraries and local traditions, helped mould British West Africa's culture. The British West African colonial school curriculum helped play a role in this. Local elites developed, with new values and philosophies, who changed the overall cultural development.

== Aftermath ==
Even after its final dissolution, a single currency, the British West African pound, was in effect throughout the region — including Nigeria — from 1907 to 1962.

Nigeria gained independence in 1960. Sierra Leone was self-governing by 1958 and gained independence in 1961. The Gambia gained independence in 1965. In 1954, the Colony of the Gold Coast was allowed by Britain to self-govern, and in 1957, the Gold Coast was given independence from Britain, under the name of the Dominion of Ghana.

== See also ==
- British colonisation in Africa
  - British Togoland
  - British Cameroons
  - British West African pound
  - Colonial Nigeria
  - Gambia Colony and Protectorate
  - Gold Coast (British colony)
  - Royal West African Frontier Force
  - Sierra Leone Colony and Protectorate
- European colonisation of Africa
  - Brandenburger Gold Coast
  - Danish Gold Coast
  - Dutch Gold Coast
  - Portuguese Gold Coast
  - Swedish Gold Coast
- Scramble for Africa
- West Africa cricket team
