= Gambian literature =

Gambian literature consists of the oral and written literary tradition of the people of the Gambia. Oral literature, including the traditional griots and various forms of ritual poetry, has historically been the predominant type of cultural transmission in line with the wider Senegambia. An English-language, written Gambian literature has emerged since the 1960s, spearheaded by Lenrie Peters.

== Oral literature ==
In the Gambia, like much of West Africa, the oral literary tradition has historically been the predominant type of cultural transmission. This is the domain of the griots, the traditional Senegambian storytellers that often accompany their stories with traditional music, performed using instruments like the kora. These stories serve to preserve family histories and moral values, and historically griots have even accompanied kings to wars for moral encouragement. With modernisation, traditional griots have been replaced by musical performers and entertainers such as Jaliba Kuyateh.

Gambian oral literature also encompasses various musical and poetic forms of expressions associated with rituals or cultural events, such as tassou, recited before dance performances, baku, poetic expressions used by wrestlers to intimidate opponents as well as poetry recited in circumcision ceremonies.

== Written literature in English ==
Tijan Sallah is one of the most prominent Gambian authors.

The production of English-language literature in the Gambia has been more limited when compared to other English-speaking countries in Africa. Authors writing on African literature have tended to overlook literature from the Gambia, or outright stated that there is no Gambian literature. John Povey, writing in the 1986 volume African literatures in the 20th century, claimed that the Gambia has "only minimal basis for any identifiable or sustained national literature" given that the country itself exists as a result of "colonial indifference to natural boundaries". Tijan Sallah, a prominent Gambian author, argues that the question of a distinct Gambian literature is intrinsically tied to national identity and "that narrative which emerged with the colonial construction of the Gambian nation". He also argues that texts that are to be regarded as part of a "national" Gambian literature cannot be limited to one of the country's ethnic groups and thus should necessarily be written in English, the country's lingua franca, although he does acknowledge that such a definition is controversial. He notes that the lack of a sufficient number of readers with sufficient purchasing powers as well as publishing houses and literary critics in the Gambia have impeded the development of Gambian literature.

Lenrie Peters is considered the founder of Gambian literature. Peters published his first works in the 1960s, including two poetry collections and his only novel, The Second Round; his first distinctly Gambian work, however, is seen by Sallah and Stewart Brown as Katchikali, a poetry collection published in 1971, after his return to the Gambia. Following his return, Peters remained an active writer and engaged with the social and political issues facing the Gambia in his writing. He also acted as a catalyst for increasing literary output in his homeland, founding the magazine Ndanaan, published by the Gambian Writers Club between 1971 and 1976 in five issues. Brown notes that there was not much that was "intrinsically interesting" in this magazine with the exception of Gabriel John Roberts's play, A Coup is Planned, about the power imbalance between Senegal and the Gambia. Sallah defends the publication as a forum that encouraged creative writing by various Gambian writers, even if its content may have been a "false start". Apart from Roberts, other writers to emerge in this period include Tijan Sallah, Nana Grey-Johnson, Augusta Jawara and Swaebou Conateh.

This generation was followed in the 1980s and 1990s by writers such as Ebou Dibba, Sheriff Sarr, Nana Humasi and Sally Singhateh. Brown considers Dibba to be "the most accomplished of this group" and "a novelist of real stature", whilst Sallah describes his 1986 novel Chaff on the Wind (the first to be published by a Gambian since Peters's The Second Round) as "the Gambia's truly first national novel".

Following Yahya Jammeh's coup d'état in 1994 and the subsequent stifling of free expression in the Gambia, literary production within the country was also limited. The 1990s saw another literary magazine in the form of Topic Magazine, and occasionally poetry was published in newspapers such as Gambian Observer and Foroyaa. Writers to have emerged since 2000 include Mariama Khan, Momodou Sallah and Bala S. K. Saho.

== Written literature in other languages ==
In the precolonial period, Arabic had been the most commonly used language by the literates in Senegambia. In the postcolonial period, Arabic-language literature has been produced by those in religious milieus, such as Imam Alhaji Alieu Badara Faye, who wrote various manuscripts in Wolof and Arabic, many of which remain unpublished. Amongst his Arabic-language poetry is "Mimaah katalil Baitil Lassa", which is often sung by the Gambian police band during Independence Day parades. Additionally, various Islamic scholars from the Gambia have produced works of Islamic theology in Arabic, Wolof, Fula or Mandinka.

== Bibliography ==
- Brown, Stewart (2014). "Gambian fictions". In Raji, Wumi (ed.). Contemporary literature of Africa: Tijan M. Sallah and literary works of The Gambia. Amherst, New York: Cambria Press. pp. 19–34. ISBN 978-1-60497-867-4.
- Perfect, David (2016). "Literature". Historical dictionary of the Gambia (Fifth ed.). Lanham, Maryland. ISBN 9781442265264.
- Povey, John (1986). "Gambian literature". In Klein, Leonard S. (ed.). African literatures in the 20th century: a guide. New York: The Ungar Publishing Company. pp. 62–63.
- Saine, Abdoulaye (2012). Culture and customs of Gambia. Santa Barbara, Calif.: Greenwood. ISBN 9780313359101.
- Sallah, Tijan M. (2021). Saani baat: aspects of African literature and culture (Senegambian and other African essays). Trenton, New Jersey: Africa World Press. ISBN 978-1-5690269-8-4.
