= The Emergence of African Fiction =

1972 academic study on African literature by Charles Larson

- Front cover, 1972 edition
- Author: Charles R. Larson
- Language: English
- Subject: African literature
- Published: 1972, rev. ed. 1978
- Publisher: Indiana UP/Macmillan
- Publication place: United States

The Emergence of African Fiction is a 1972 academic monograph by American scholar Charles R. Larson. It was published initially by Indiana University Press, and again, in a slightly revised edition, in 1978 by Macmillan. Larson's study has elicited very different responses: it was praised (both at the time of publication, and half a century after) as an early and important book in the study and appreciation of African literature in the West, but for others it remained stuck in a Eurocentric, even colonizing mode in which Western aesthetics were still the unspoken standard for artistic assessment.

== Background ==
Larson was one of the first American academics to teach, anthologize, and write about the emerging literature from Africa. At the time few academic monographs for an American readership had been published on the topic. Eustace Palmer's An Introduction to the African Novel (1972) disregarded one and disparaged another of the two books later considered masterpieces of African literature: Amos Tutuola's The Palm-Wine Drinkard (1952), which Larson praised highly and considered one of the continent's "literary landmarks", and Wole Soyinka's The Interpreters (1965), which Palmer said suffered from "'aimless virtuosity' and 'tedious formlessness'". Margaret Laurence's Long Drums and Cannons (1968), about Nigerian writers of fiction and drama, was "largely expository", according to one critic, and Wilfred Cartey's Whispers from a Continent, according to that same critic, was less "intellectually rigorous".

The need for a serious African literary criticism was indicated also by Solomon O. Iyasere, who noted that the "socio-anthropological" approach taken by some equates traditionalism with literary merit, and debases the artistic value of African writing, and that the more aesthetic and literary approaches were based on European concepts and thus inadequate. Needed was an "African aesthetics" which could take account of "the curious aspects of African fiction which perplex western sensibilities, such as lack of character delineation, undisciplined plot, the high frequency of didactic endings, and oddities that permeate the works of, for example, Amos Tutuola". Larson's book, according to Iyasere, was such an attempt, and it was marketed as such; Indiana UP advertised the book with a blurb by Es'kia Mphahlele: "I find it challenging, provocative. Helps break down myths about African literature while at the same time being exploratory, sifting critical approaches through a close look at the texts themselves. His is a wholesome empirical approach that accommodates the past, present and future trends of African writing. One will not always agree with him, but no one can question his sincerity and passion and insight."

== Content ==
Larson attempts to situate African fiction in its historical origin, in oral literature, and is concerned with establishing its categories and idiom. One of the remnants of tribal life and culture is a different sense of the human individual than the West has, one in which "no one person but an entire group of people" is all-important. Some of the specifically African literary strategies he notes is the weaving together in African fiction of individual episodes, in a folkloristic manner, and the lack of "objective time", as in Tutuola's The Palm-Wine Drinkard. In contrast with the exposition of Laurence and the polemic of Cartey, Larson tries to build a thesis, an African aesthetic, in which what count as deficiencies in Western novels are actually hallmarks of African literature: "the lack of characterization, the minimal motivation, the external rather than internal explication of decisions, the avoidance of all the psychological insight that so characterized modern novels", according to John Povey.

Oral literature, says Larson, shapes the works of African writers and reshapes the novel form. African novels, he argues, are complete works of art, not treasure troves for anthropologists. Iyasere identifies two main points in Larson's argument: "(1) that the African novel is frequently different from its Western counterpart and that the differences can be attributed to cultural backgrounds; and (2) that in spite of several typical unities which are generally considered to hold the Western novel together, that is, to give it its structural background, the African writer has created new unities which give his fiction form and pattern". In addition, Larson identifies five categories through which he analyzes African fiction: "initial exposure to the West, adaptation to Western education, urbanization, politics, and individual life style and estrangement" (summarized by Robert Morsberger).

Individual chapters focus on Things Fall Apart (1958), on the mass-market literature coming from Onitsha, on The Palm-Wine Drinkard, and on Ngũgĩ wa Thiong'o, of whom he treats six novels. A long essay discusses Camara Laye's The Radiance of the King (1954), which Larson considered "the greatest of all African novels .... because of its assimilation of African material into the novel form". Finally, a long chapter on Lenrie Peters's The Second Round (1965) ponders to which extent the African novelist is specifically an African novelist. Commenting on The Beautyful Ones Are Not Yet Born (1968) Larson suggests its author, Ayi Kwei Armah, is an example of a new generation of African writers who are writers first, African second.

== Critical response ==
=== Contemporary reviews ===
The book drew considerable attention, reflected by the number of reviews—but those reviews were mixed. While critics appreciated Larson's close readings, many found fault with Larson's categorizations and comparisons, even accusing him of a kind of colonialism. John Povey wondered whether a "new African aesthetic" made sense if, as Larson's discussion of Armah, suggested, modern African writers wrote less in an African vein than earlier authors. Still, he considered Larson a fine and sensible critic, and the book a "provocative and always intelligent study". Iyasere considers Larson's criteria too broad and vague, and his selection of texts is small and seems tailored to affirming the value of the categories he wants them to confirm. Moreover, his reliance on remnants of oral literature becomes an end in itself, and (as did other critics) he severely criticizes Larson's reading of the final paragraph of Chinua Achebe's Things Fall Apart. However, he appreciates the book's determination to treat Africa's literature as art in its own right, in contrast to what he called "paternalistic" studies of African novels. (Note: Iyasere cites G. D. Killam, The Novels of Chinua Achebe (1969), Judith Gleason, This Africa: novels by West Africans in English and French (1965), and Margaret Laurence, Long Drums and Cannons (1968).)

Bruce King, in a review published in Obsidian: Literature and Arts in the African Diaspora, called it "one of the best books available on African literature". He remarked, "In general the criticism of African literature has been superficial and unanalytical.... Larson's detailed analysis of style, structure and form is an improvement in this field." He does criticize Larson for oversimplifying in his interpretations, and he disagrees with a number of his interpretations. In addition, he thinks that Larson does not pay enough attention to the variety of influences at work in African literature, including Christianity, religious mysticism, and Western writing.

Ebele Obumselu, who reviewed the book for Research in African Literatures, considered that Larson's use of categories sometimes relied on prejudice, and that Larson cannot get away from implicitly comparing the African with the European novel. Obumselu praises the chapter on Things Fall Apart, which he says makes sense because Achebe seems to write based on the European canon even while departing from it, but this kind of analysis does nothing for The Palm-Wine Drinkard, whose structure and imaginative world does not resemble any European model, though Larson tries to link it to European quest romances. Obumselu is also not convinced by Larson's reading of Laye's Radiance, which Larson, he says, treats too easily as an essentially African text while disregarding the importance of the Muslim conquest of the area, which plays an important role in the book.

In a 1974 review for Black World, Omolara Leslie offered a critique similar to the ones by Iyasere and Obumselu. There is praise for his sometimes precise and valuable close readings, mixed with criticism of an often erroneous generalizing stance on some matters. For instance, Leslie does not accept Larson's dictum that proverbs are much more important among the Igbo people than elsewhere in Africa, or the suggestion that the culture and background of Peter Abrahams is representative of all of Black Africa. Moreover, Leslie argues, what Larson treats is not the "emergence" of African fiction, which had existed for a long time; nor does African fiction emerge in European languages after World War 2, the period Larson treats, since African authors already wrote in Portuguese in the late 1800s (and Larson disregards non-Anglophone literature). Rather, Leslie argues, Larson effaces his authorial persona while building an ostensibly objective argument about African fiction based on personal thoughts and beliefs. His Western point of view shows itself throughout, for instance in the discussion of the popular Onitsha literature, where Larson disregards specific African points of significance (such as in the treatment of the older prostitute in Cyprian Ekwensi's 1961 novel Jagua Nana), and in the constant referencing of Western authors and books—such as the title "Pamela in Africa" for the chapter on Onitsha literature, in reference to Samuel Richardson's Pamela; or, Virtue Rewarded.

The most detailed and lengthy critique came from David Maughan Brown, who reviewed the revised 1978 edition of the book, published by Macmillan. That edition, Brown argues, was likely prompted by a response to Larson's book by Ghanaian novelist Ayi Kwei Armah who, according to Larson, had been rejected by Africa, had sought exile outside of it, and was heavily influenced by James Joyce. Armah, who rarely interacted with critics, responded to Larson's book in a scathing article, in which he used the term "larsony" to mean "the judicious distortion of African truths to fit western prejudices". Brown's assessment of the revised edition is that only a few phrases pertaining to Armah had been changed (to save the expense of having to type-set the book again), and that the bibliography had been updated a bit—but not enough to bring it up to date. Brown notes that earlier mistakes (typos, misquotations) were still present in the revised edition. And statements from the first edition, for instance about the possibilities for grants and jobs in Africa, were already incorrect then, and are seriously wrong in the revised edition, says Brown. Like Iyasere, Brown also criticizes Larson's reading of the ending of Achebe's Things Fall Apart, in much the same terms. In addition, Brown sees many mistakes in Larson's analyses and plot summaries ("careless reading and sheer bad writing"), and says Larson's treatment of Laye's The Radiance of the King proves that for Larson Western notions of genre remain the measure for African novels. The most serious charge, however, is brought up in relation to Ngũgĩ wa Thiong'o, whom Larson referred to in both editions as "James Ngugi"--though by 1970, before the first edition of Emergence, Ngũgĩ wa Thiong'o had already "Africanized" his English name. This, for Brown, damns the entire book: "The mere perpetuation of the name James Ngugi in 1978 gives evidence of a Western approach to African literature so inflexible and so insensitive that it is difficult to take anything Larson has to say about Ngugi, or any other writer for that matter, seriously". Besides, Larson's discussion of Ngũgĩ wa Thiong'o's novels, says Brown, betrays a colonial attitude toward the writer and toward Kenya.

=== Later responses ===
Decades after publication, Larson's book was still cited in academic articles discussing African literature's form and structure, but critics continued to find fault with it. Chiwengo Ngwarsungu, in 1990, while discussing characterization, denied Larson's thesis that "situational plots are being replaced by works which concentrate on individual character", or that description and the handling of time and space were becoming more European. In general, Larson considered that African writing was becoming like Western writing, which Ngwarsungu denied: "The African novel will certainly borrow from Western techniques; nonetheless, I can hardly conceive an African novel which would lose all identity to be confused with a Western novel." Komla Mossan Nubukpo, also in 1990, noted that Larson does not treat any African women writers. The term "larsony" (in Armah's words, "the judicious distortion of African truths to fit Western prejudices") also has an afterlife, in discussions on translatability and the understanding of texts across different cultures, in the assessment of Wole Soyinka and his possible collaboration with British colonial agency, and as "an addition to the lexicon of African literary discourse".

Many later critics of African literature continue the notes struck by earlier critics, seeing the study as well-meaning and timely but flawed. In 2010, Charles E. Nnolim confirmed the important status of the "much-discussed, much-vilified, controversial work", which "tries desperately to fill a void by trying to advance some theory of African fiction": it was flawed, and used stereotypes as standards, but it pointed in the right direction. Linus Tongwo Asong noted (in 2012) the lapses and the Eurocentric mode (but Larson, he says, was not the only critic guilty of that), but also comments that the book, as one of the first on the topic, had been regarded as "highly provocative" and thus useful for African writers and critics to develop a more African criticism.

In 2021, Gambian poet and prose writer Tijan Sallah, who in an obituary for Larson referred to him as "a great bridge builder across cultures", said that The Emergence of African Fiction was a trailblazing book.
