= Hannah Mahoney =

Gambian politician

- Born: August 1, 1884
- Died: May 10, 1974 (aged 89)
- Spouse(s): John A. Mahoney
- Children: Augusta Jawara, John Andrew Mahoney, Louise N'Jie
- Relatives: Edward Francis Small

Lady Hannah Mahoney (August 1, 1884 – May 10, 1974) was a politician in The Gambia. A pioneering female politician, she was the first woman in the country to hold a number of roles, including justice of the peace and magistrate. She was the wife of Sir John A. Mahoney, first Speaker of the Legislative Council of the Gambia.

Hannah Small was born on August 1, 1884 in a Methodist family of Aku or Krio origin in Bathurst (now Banjul) in British Gambia. She completed a seventh grade education, the highest level then available locally, in 1902, which made her eligible for clerical jobs. She became a typist with the civil service, the first Gambian woman to do so. Reportely, locals were so surprised that at this that they would come to her window to see her work. She retired from the civil service in 1941.

In 1943, she became a member of the Bathurst Advisory Town Council, becoming the first woman in Gambia to hold a position in local government. She held this position for fifteen years, and lowering infant mortality was one of her key concerns. She later became the first female Justice of the Peace (JP) and the first female magistrate in Gambia.

== Personal life ==
Her brother was the politician Edward Francis Small.

In 1910, she married John A. Mahoney, then a mercantile clerk. They had five children, including:

- Dr. John Andrew Mahoney (1919-2012) surgeon and health administrator and husband of historian Dr. Florence Mahoney.
- Louise (Mahoney) N’Jie (1922-2014), the first woman to serve as a cabinet minister in The Gambia
- Augusta Mahoney, Lady Jawara (1924–1981), nurse, playwright, and activist, wife of Sir Dawda Jawara, Prime Minister of the Gambia.
