= Dej Mahoney =

British legal and business consultant

- Born: Ayodeji Mahoney; December 1963 (age 62); London, England
- Education: Epsom College; Emmanuel College, Cambridge
- Occupations: Legal and business consultant in entertainment and related sectors
- Parent(s): Florence Mahoney and Dr John Mahoney
- Relatives: Lenrie Peters (uncle), Dennis Alaba Peters (uncle)
- Website: www.allourbusiness.com

Dej Mahoney, born Ayodeji Mahoney, is a British legal and business consultant in the entertainment and related sectors, with more than 30 years' experience within the music and media industries. His career has encompassed being an entertainment lawyer and a producer, former Vice-President of Business Affairs at Sony Music, as well as founding director since 2001 of London-based organisation All Our Business (AOB). In 2020 he was appointed non-executive chair of the production music company West One Music Group.

== Biography ==
=== Family background and education ===
Mahoney was born in London of Gambian Creole parentage, one of the three sons of Florence Mahoney and Dr John Mahoney. He was given the name Ayodeji, meaning "double joy", because he was born in the same month that his mother completed her PhD in African history, becoming the first Gambian woman to obtain a doctorate, which she received from the School Oriental African Studies, University of London, in 1963. His father, Dr John Andrew Mahoney (1919–2012), was one of the earliest Gambian surgeons trained in the UK in the 1940s, studying medicine at the University of London, where he qualified as a surgeon.

From 1977 to 1982, Dej Mahoney attended Epsom College, an English boarding-school in Surrey, where he became the first Head of School of African heritage. One of his classmates at Epsom was television presenter and journalist Jeremy Vine, who has spoken of re-connecting with Mahoney in recent years. Mahoney went on to study at Emmanuel College, Cambridge, and qualified at the Bar as a Harmsworth Award winner. He was called to the Bar of England and Wales in 1986.

=== Career ===
Mahoney was Vice President of Business Affairs and New Media Development at Sony Music for 13 years, leaving in 2001 to work on his own projects.

He was Secretary of the Arts Council's African and Caribbean Music Circuit, and was a visiting lecturer on the Commercial Music degree course at the University of Westminster, and a contributing author of Music and Digitisation (International Association of Entertainment Lawyers), presented at the Midem music festival in Cannes, 2000. Other appointments include being a Member of the Mayor's Creative Commission for London in 2002.

Since 2001 he has been founding director of AOB (All Our Business), primarily a legal and business consultancy in entertainment, fashion, leisure and sport, working with a wide range of clients.

Mahoney was the lead producer of the original musical I Dream, based on the life of the American civil rights leader Martin Luther King Jr., written and composed by Douglas Tappin and directed by Jasmine Guy, which premiered in 2010 at the Woodruff Arts Center in Atlanta, Georgia.

In 2012 Mahoney was appointed a Trustee of the BRIT School, where he chairs the school's Governance Committee, and since 2016 he has been on the Governing Board of Epsom College. In 2018, he was seconded to the senior management team of Warner/Chappell Music Publishing, and he was appointed Non-Executive Chairman of West One Music Group in 2020.
