= African Writing Today =

1967 anthology of postcolonial African literature

- Author: Es'kia Mphahlele
- Language: English
- Genre: Short stories, poetry
- Publisher: Penguin Books
- Publication date: 1967; 59 years ago
- Pages: 347

African Writing Today is an anthology of postcolonial African literature, mostly short stories and a few poems, edited by South African writer, poet, and critic Es'kia Mphahlele. The anthology was published in London by Penguin Books in 1967.

Much of the literature in the anthology is from West and Southern Africa. Starting in the mid-1950s, international criticism of South Africa's apartheid regime brought more attention to race relations in the country, and as a result publishing opportunities particularly in England increased; African Writing Today was one of a number of anthologies that proved an outlet for South African writers.

The anthology features poetry, essays, short stories and excerpts from novels, drama and memoir, and among the writers included are Chinua Achebe, Christina Ama Ata Aidoo, George Awoonor-Williams, José Craveirinha, Birago Diop, David Diop, Mbella Sonne Dipoko, Marcelino dos Santos, Sarif Easmon, Cyprian Ekwensi, Luis Bernardo Honwana, Paulin Joachim, Joseph Kariuki, Alex La Guma, Camara Laye, Aké Loba, Todd Matshikiza, Ezekiel Mphahlele, Abioseh Nicol, Lewis Nkosi, Onuora Nzekwu, Grace Ogot, Ferdinand Oyono, Lenrie Peters, Jean Pliya, Richard Rive, Léopold Sédar Senghor, Ousmane Socé, Wole Soyinka, Amos Tutuola and Joseph Zobel.
