= Architecture of the Gambia =

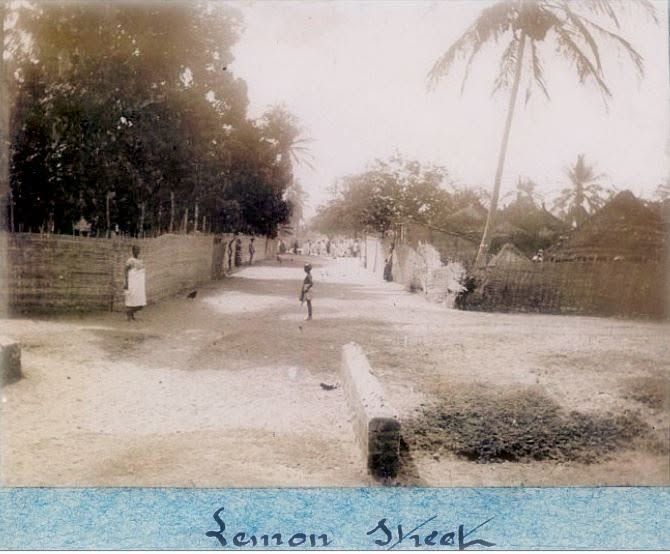
Gambia Lemon Street Bathurst 1900

Architecture in The Gambia reflects the country's climate, history, and availability of materials. The Gambia is a narrow country centered around the Gambia River, so traditional building styles usually evolved to cope with seasonal rains, heat, and humidity while still allowing for comfort.

== Traditional Gambian architecture ==
Historically many Gambian buildings were built with mud (adobe) walls, made of earthern materials, and mixed with water and sometimes with straw. these buildings usually had thatched roofs made of palms, grass, or reeds. The house designs in Gambia affect the indoor climate and keep the houses cool, and arguably were used to keep mosquitoes out.

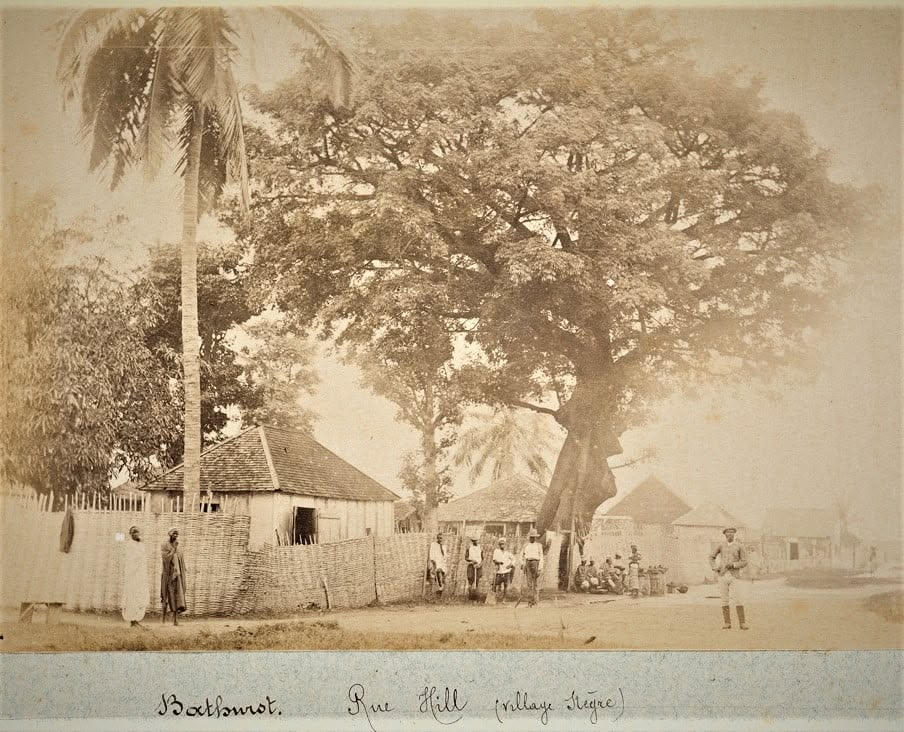
Hill Street, Bathurst The Gambia 1891 to 1892

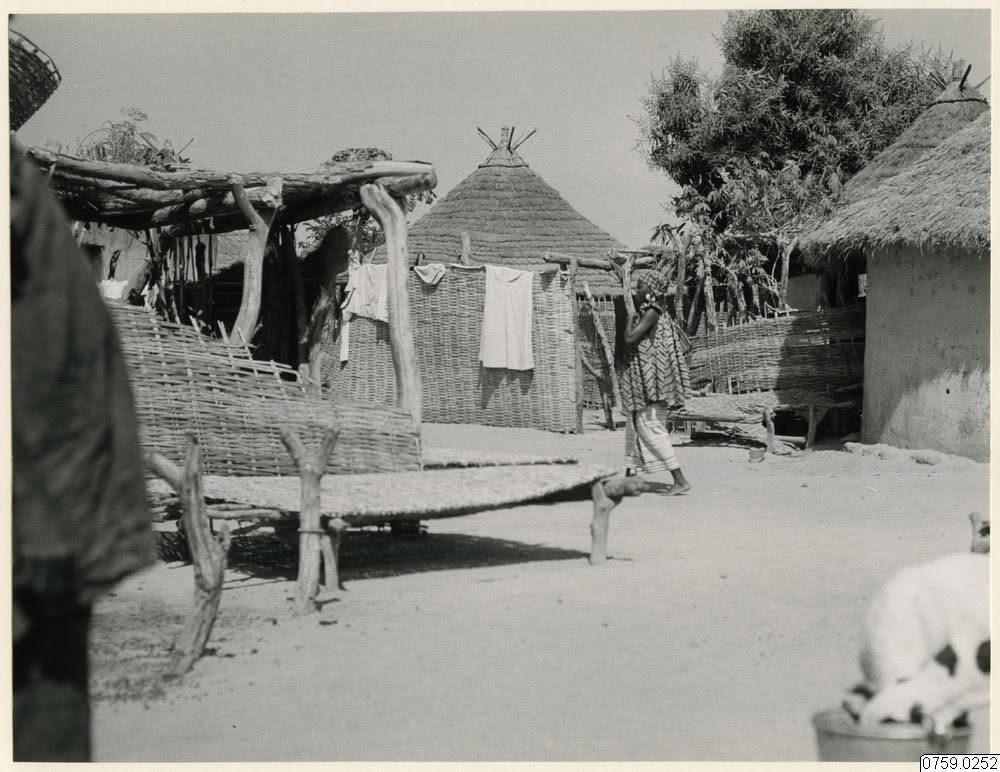
Inside a compound. Garawol village, Kantora District,

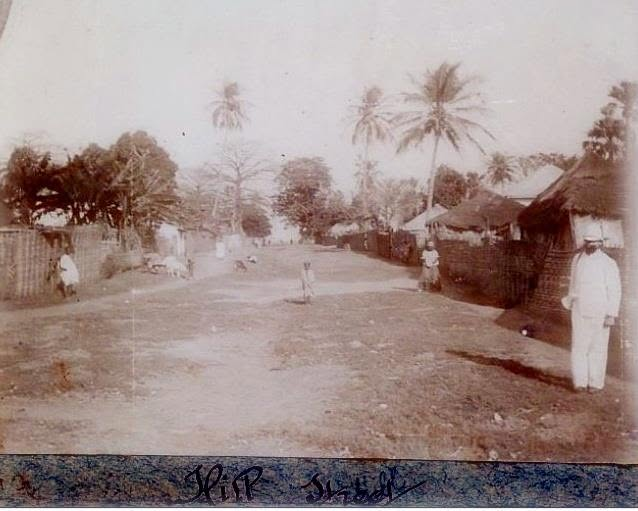
A street view of Hill Street, Bathurst (Banjul), The Gambia, 1904

== European architecture ==
Gambia has a long history of European presence. Many places in The Gambia were founded by Europeans to control trade along the Gambia River, such as the capital city of Banjul (established by the British in 1816). British colonial authorities constructed European-style buildings in much of central Banjul and neighboring areas, infusing Victorian and Edwardian architecture.

An additional factor was the presence of Creole communities, liberated Africans, and missionaries, who brought British and European style architecture to the Gambia.

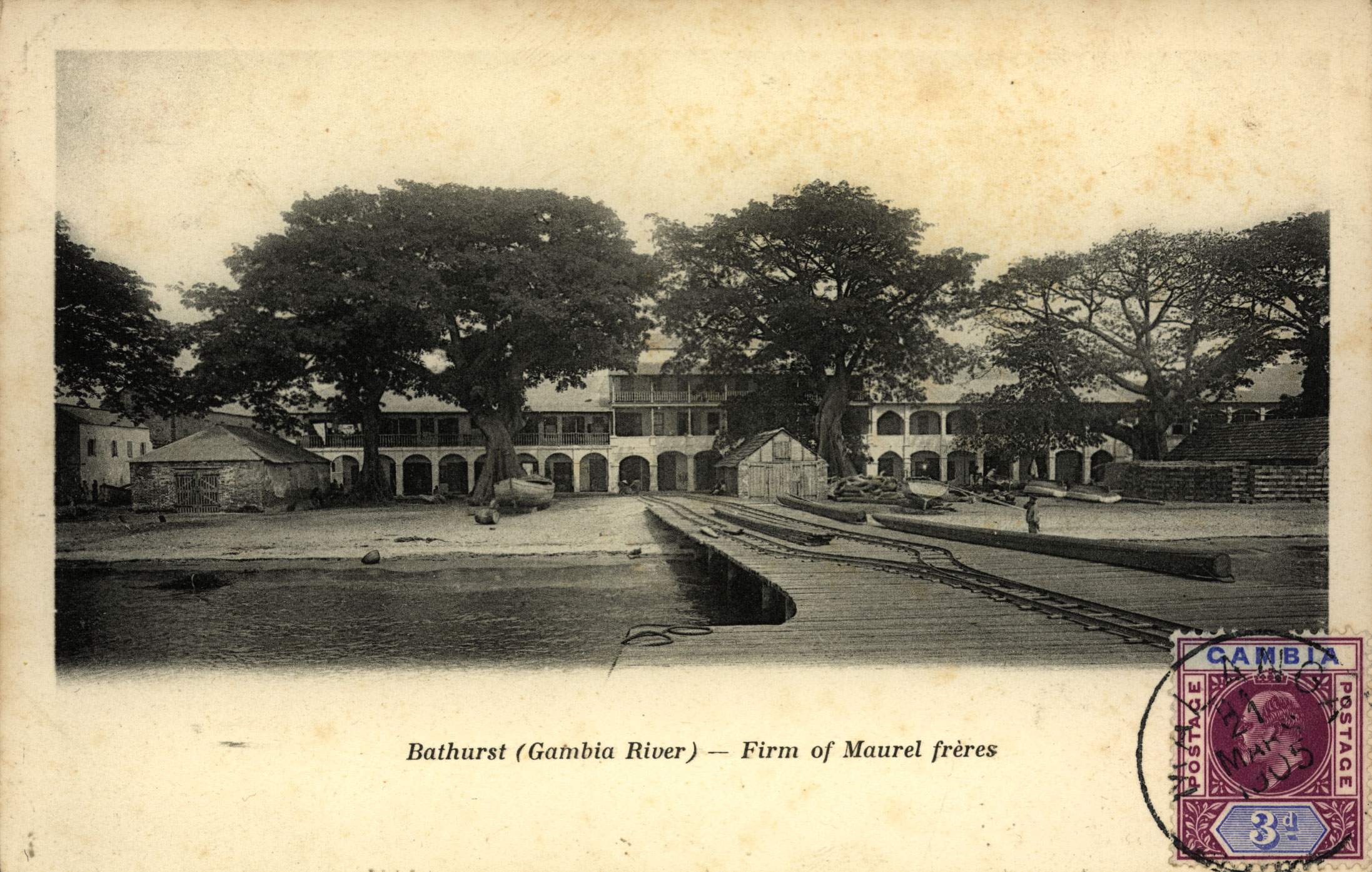
Bathurst (Gambia River) - Firm of Maurel freres

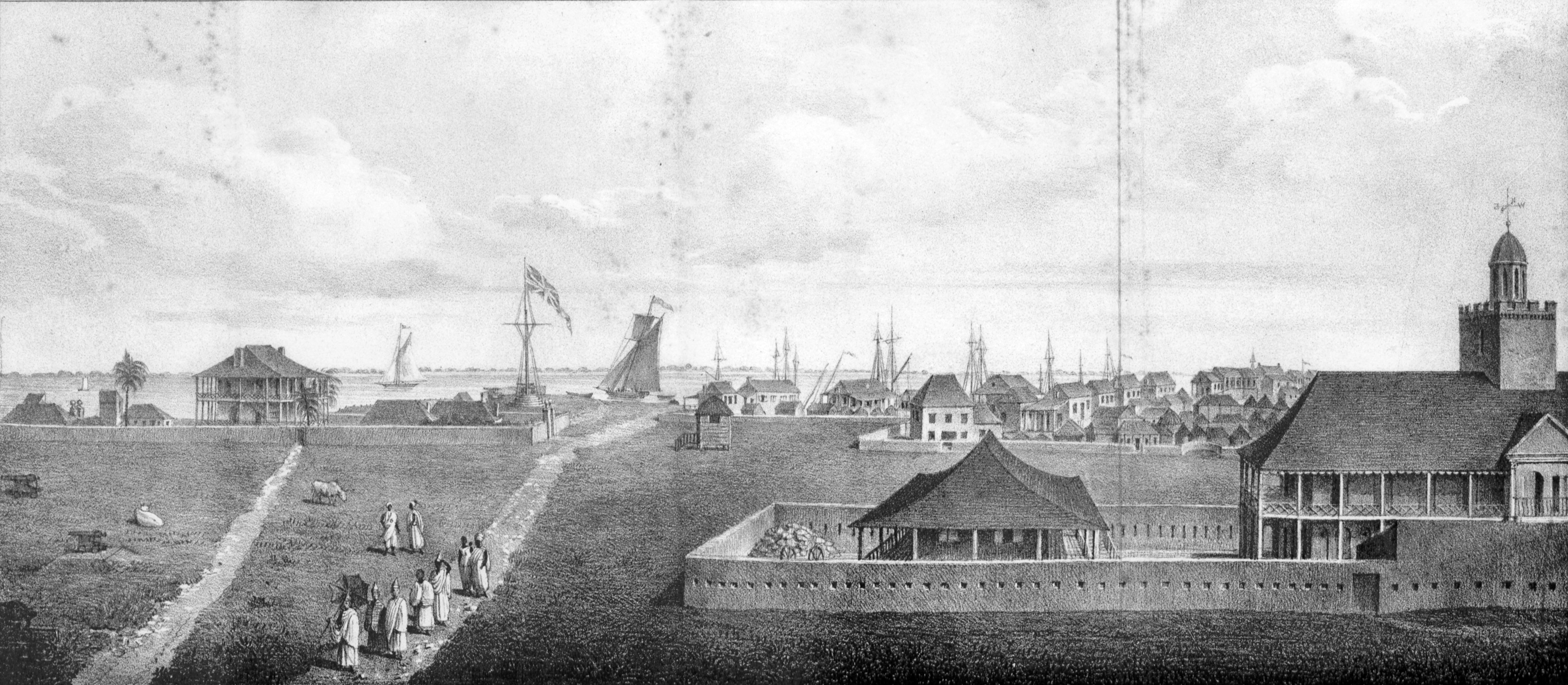
1824 Bathurst Sketch

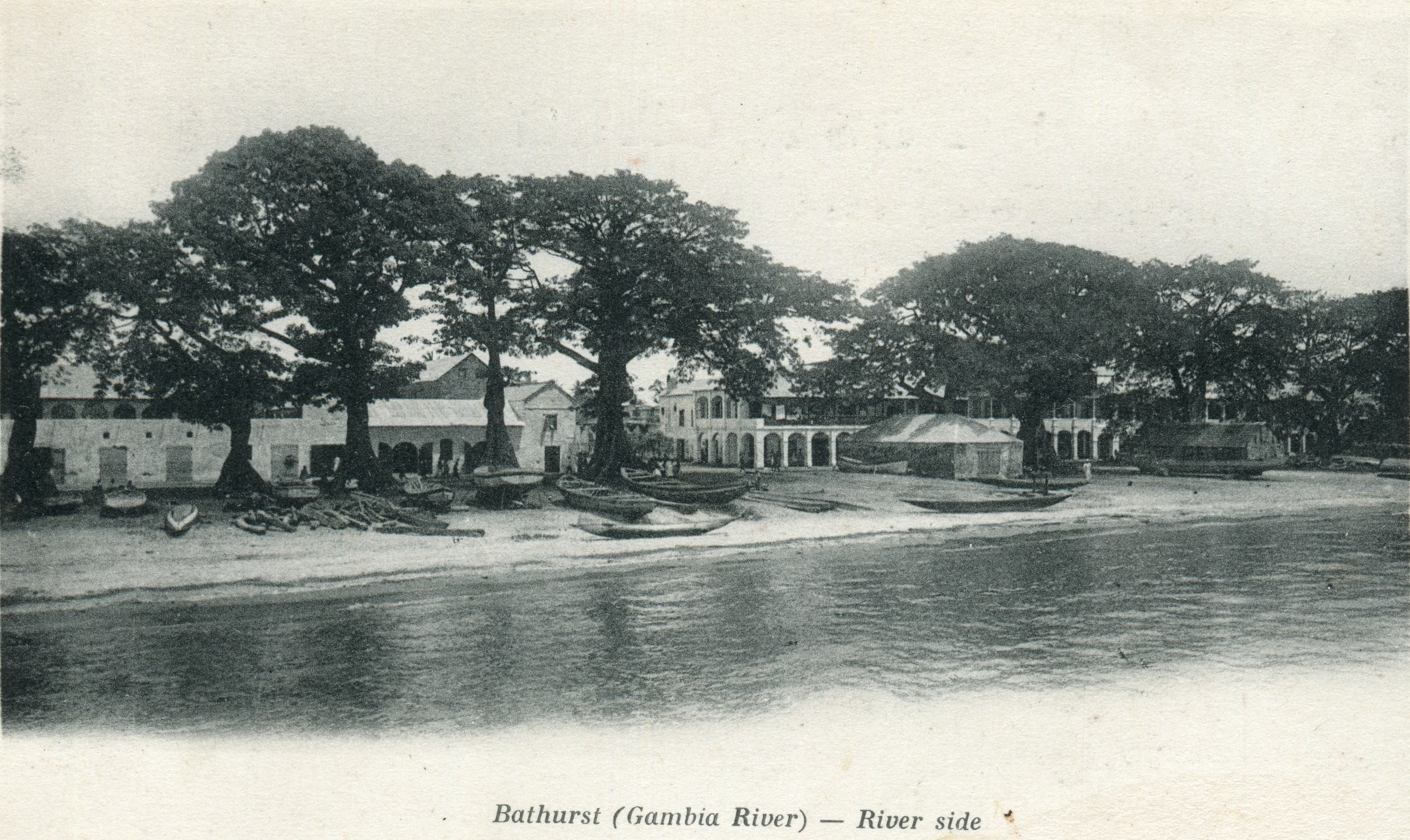
Bathurst (now Banjul), capital of The Gambia, c. 1905

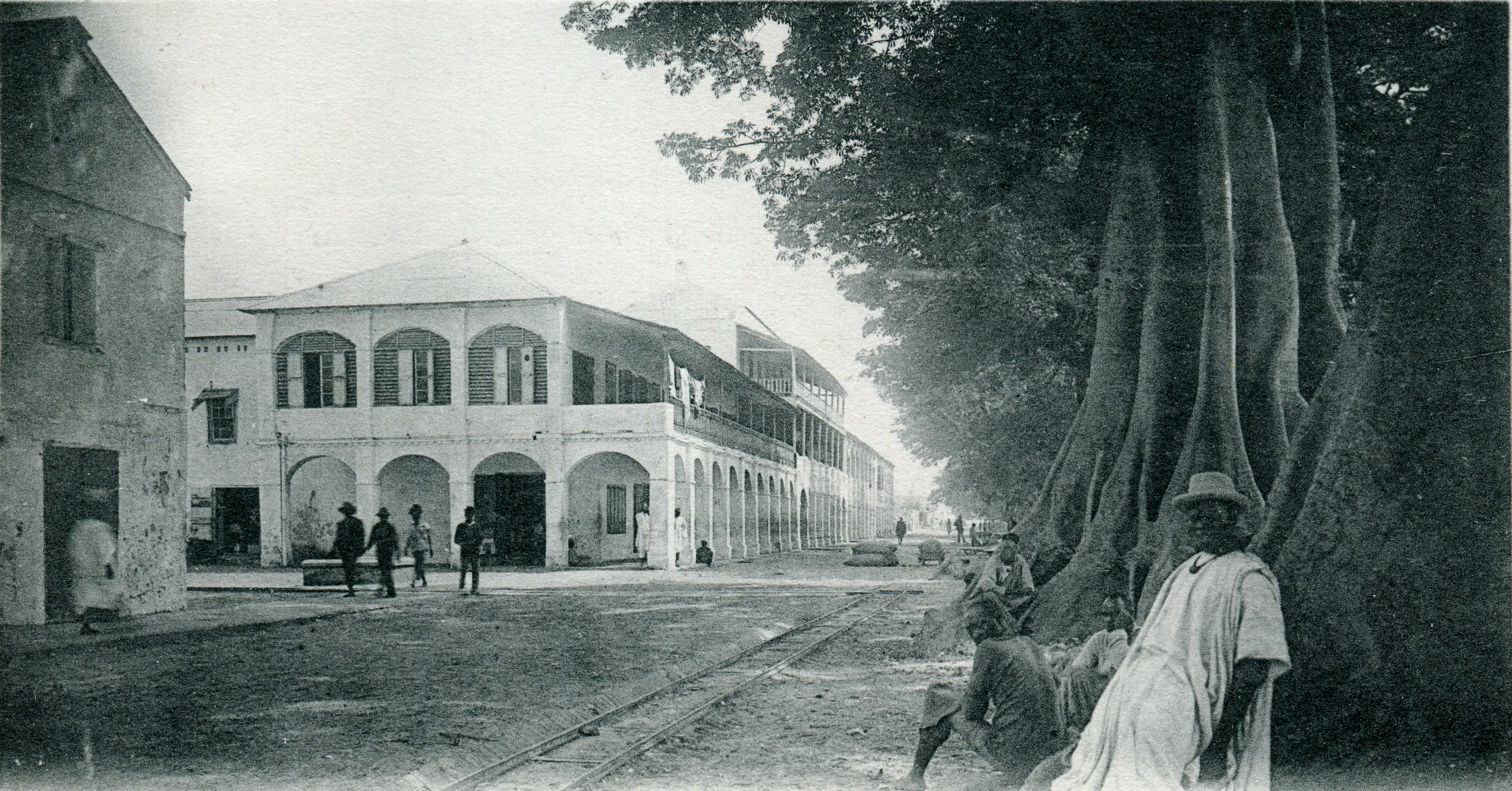
Wellington Street, Bathurst (now Banjul), capital city of The Gambia (West Africa), c. 1905

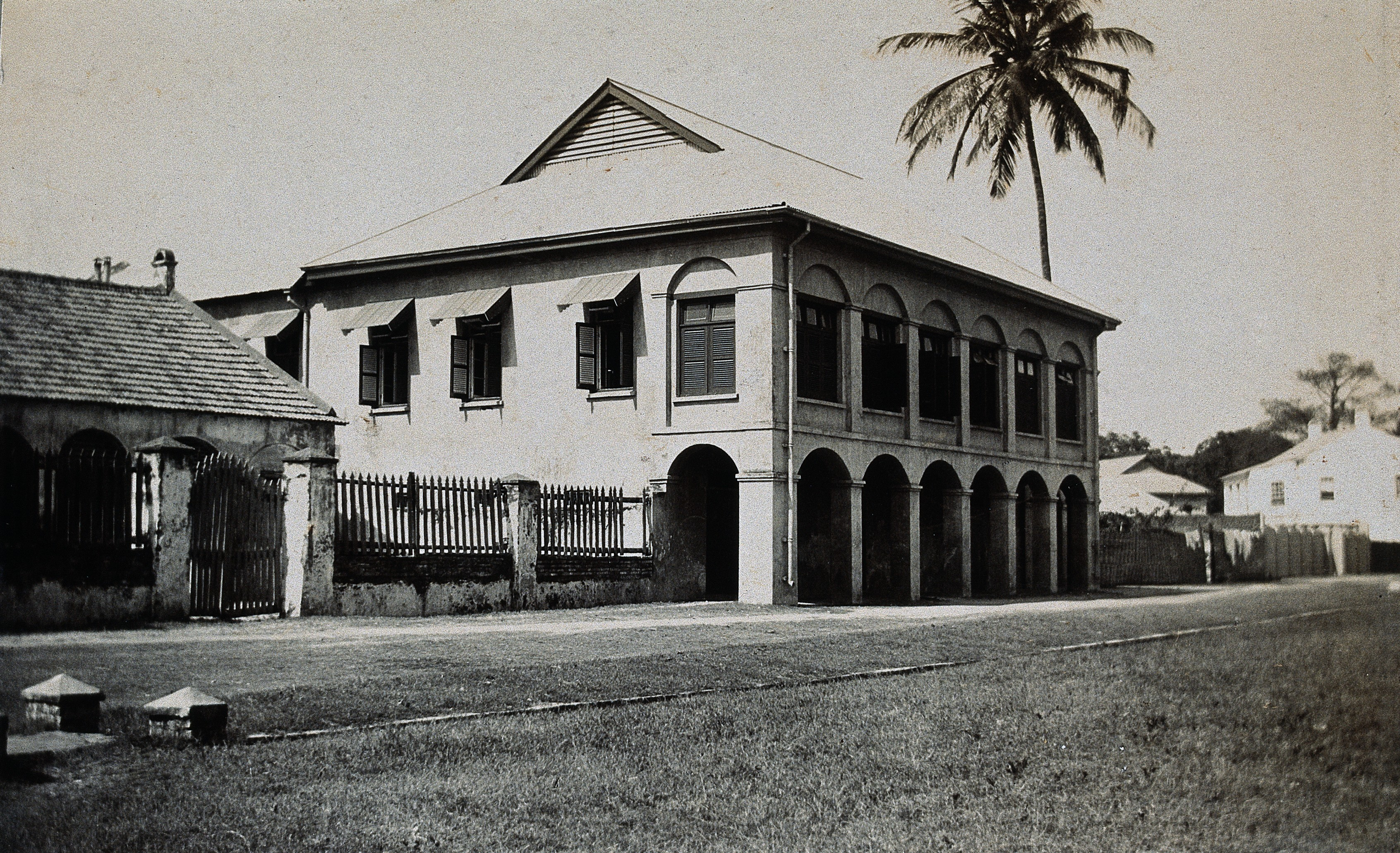
senior Medical Officers' quarters in Bathurst, Gambia. Photo Wellcome

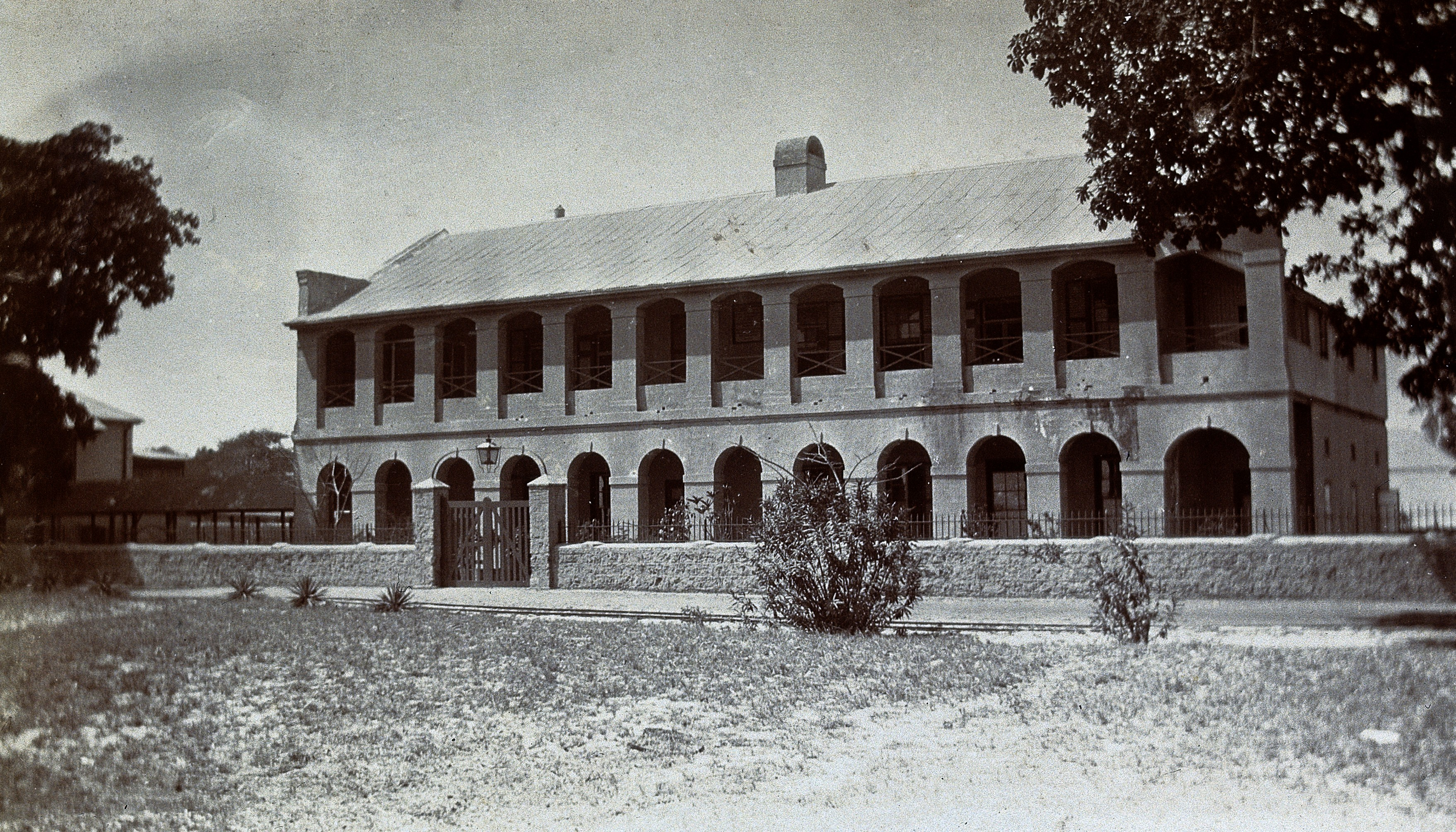
Hospital in Bathurst, Gambia. Photograph, c. 1911. Wellcome
