= Kyeyune =

Kyeyune is a surname. Notable people with the surname include:

- George William Kyeyune (born 1962), Ugandan artist
- Grace Nambatya Kyeyune (born 1962), Ugandan medicinal chemist
- Haruna Kasolo Kyeyune, Ugandan politician
- Malcom Kyeyune (born 1987), Swedish writer
- Saidi Kyeyune (born 1993), Ugandan footballer
