= Alhaji (novel) =

1992 novel

Alhaji (1992) is a novel by Ebou Dibba. It is set in The Gambia and Senegal. It was published by Macmillan of London.

== Plot summary ==
The novel's central character is a 16-year-old boy, not named until the last page of the book. He does not like school, as he does not care for his teacher, Quasi. The boy's favorite companion is a horse, Alhaji.

A businessman named Alhaji Kebba contacts the boy and wishes to buy and/or borrow the horse Alhaji. While the boy is reluctant to sell or loan him, the businessman is persistent and uses various methods to try to persuade him, including the use of a prostitute.

Later, two agents introduce themselves to the boy. One is Quasi, who has been posing as a teacher. Another is Nicholls. They have been tracking Alhaji Kebba's illegal activities and have a plan to catch him. They recruit the boy to help them.
