= Tijan Sallah =

Gambian poet and economist (born 1958)

Personal details
- Born: Tijan M. Sallah; 6 March 1958 (age 68) Serekunda, Kombo Division, The Gambia, West Africa
- Education: Virginia Polytechnic Institute and State University; Berea College; Rabun Gap-Nacoochee School
- Occupation: Poet, writer and economist
- Awards: YWAG Prize for Gambian Literature

Tijan M. Sallah (born 6 March 1958) is a Gambian poet and prose writer and economist.

== Early life ==
Tijan Sallah was born in Serekunda, The Gambia, on 6 March 1958. His mother was of Wolof ethnicity and his father was a Tukulor, who, according to Sallah, was a descendant of the ruling families of Futa Tooro. He attended koranic schools (locally known as daras) from the age of four, before entering Serrekunda Primary School, where he describes his teacher Harrietta Ndow as having been particularly influential. He then entered St. Augustine's High School, run by Irish Holy Ghost Fathers, and was exposed to classical British literary texts (such as William Shakespeare's plays, the works of George Orwell and Dickens, etc.) and the Bible. Although his father, Momodou Musa Sallah (Dodou Sallah), was imam of the local mosque in Serekunda, he did not mind his son studying the Bible, as it was part of the heritage of the Abrahamic religions.

Under these influences and encouraged by his teachers at St. Augustine's High School, in particular Joseph Gough, Sallah became interested in creative writing and started writing poetry by his third year. He published his first poem, "The African Redeemer", a poem paying tribute to Kwame Nkrumah, in the St. Augustine's school newspaper, Sunu Kibaro. This early poem had been uncharacteristically compliant to the traditional forms of rhyming and was clearly influenced by the English classics he had been studying. Lenrie Peters, the founder of Gambian literature, was a major influence on Sallah's work by this stage, as Sallah took his poetry to Peters's clinic for him to critique it. Peters wanted to promote Sallah's work, he managed to arrange for Sallah to appear on Bemba Tambedou's national radio programme, Writers of The Gambia. Having graduated from St. Augustine's in 1975, Sallah worked for two years as an audit clerk in the Customs Department and then in the Government Post Office, and at the same time tried to secure a scholarship to continue his studies at the United States.

In 1977, Sallah went to the United States to study at Rabun Gap Nacoochee School in Rabun County, Georgia.

== Literary career ==
In Georgia, Sallah was influenced by Lloyd Van Brunt, an American poet who had been organising literary workshops at his high school, who was impressed by Sallah's writing. He published his first poem in the United States, "Worm Eaters", a satiric poem about hypocrisy in the Atlanta Gazette of February 1978; and also ran the school newspaper at this time. After graduating with honours at Rabun Gap, he continued on to Berea College in Kentucky, where he also worked as a dishwasher in his first year to fund his studies. He was then employed as a tutor by the English department, and edited three college journals. He came under the influence of several prominent Appalachian writers, Jim Wayne Miller, Lee Pennington, Bill Best, and Gurney Norman. Sallah published several poems and short stories in Appalachian, American, African and European publications and edited several of the campus literary publications. At Berea College, he also came in touch with a distinguished Indian philosopher and literary figure, Professor P. Lal, publisher of the Writers Workshop series in Calcutta, India, who at the time was a visiting professor of Hindu philosophy at Berea. Upon hearing Sallah read his poetry, he was impressed and requested a manuscript to consider for publication.

In 1980, Sallah published his first poetry collection, When African Was a Young Woman, under the Writers Workshop publication series. It was reviewed on the BBC by Florence Akst and received several other favourable reviews. Since then, Sallah's works have gained worldwide recognition. He was interviewed by the American National Public Radio in 1997 by Scott Simon, and in August 2000 by Kojo Nnamdi. Sallah's writings have received accolades from critics. Charles Larson, the noted American literary critic, said that "there is little question about Sallah's talent". Siga Jagne describes him as a writer of "genius". Nana Grey-Johnson describes Sallah as "one of the finest young minds The Gambia has produced in years".

On the publication of Sallah's most recent poetry collection, I Come From a Country, E. Ethelbert Miller said: "Sallah writes about home after traveling around the world. He offers love without apology. There is brightness in this book."

== Professional career ==
Sallah had been interested in becoming a medical doctor, but upon realising the difficulties associated with this as a foreigner in the US, he changed his focus to economics. He graduated from Berea College in economics and business as the most outstanding student there in 1982, and went on to Virginia Polytechnic Institute, where he received an MA and PhD in economics.

He taught economics at Kutztown University of Pennsylvania and North Carolina A&T University in the late 1980s, before joining the World Bank, where he is sector manager for agriculture, irrigation and rural development for eastern and southern African countries.

== Personal life ==
Sallah is married to the Malian Fatim Haidara, an engineer, and they have a daughter and son.

== Awards and recognition ==
- Young Writers of The Gambia (YWAG) Prize for Gambian Literature, Writers Association of The Gambia

== Works ==
=== Poetry collections ===
- When Africa Was a Young Woman, Calcutta, India: Writers Workshop, 1980
- Kora Land: poems, Washington DC.: Three Continents Press, US, 1989
- Dreams of Dusty Roads: new poems, Washington DC: Three Continents Press, US, 1993
- Dream Kingdom: new and selected poems, Trenton, NJ: Africa World Press, 2007
- Harrow: London Poems of Convalescence, Global Hands Publishing, Leicester, UK, 2014
- I Come From a Country, Africa World Press, 2021

=== Anthologies ===
- (ed.) New Poets of West Africa, Malthouse Press, Nigeria, 1995
- (ed.) with Tanure Ojaide, The New African Poetry: an anthology, Lynne Rienner Publishers, Colorado, 1999
- (guest ed.) A World Assembly of Poets, Re-markings, Agra, India, Vol. 16, No. 4, November 2017

=== Short stories ===
- Before the New Earth: African short stories, Calcutta: Writers Workshop, 1988.
- "Weaverdom", in Chinua Achebe and C. L. Innes, eds, Contemporary African Short Stories, 1992.
- "Innocent Terror", in Charles Larson (ed.), Under African Skies: Modern African Stories, 1997, Farrar, Straus and Giroux.
- "Innocent Terror", in Encounters from Africa, An Anthology of Short Stories, Macmillan Kenya Publishers, 2000, pp. 99–106.

=== Biography ===
- (with Ngozi Okonjo-Iweala) Chinua Achebe: Teacher of light: a biography, Trenton, NJ: Africa World Press, 2003.

=== Ethnography ===
- Wolof, Rosen Publishing, 1996. ISBN 978-0823919871

=== Literary criticism ===
- Saani Baat: Aspects of African Literature and Culture, Trenton, NJ: Africa World Press, 2021.
