= June Abbott =

British actress and director

- Born: 16 June 1942; Leeds, England
- Died: 23 December 2020 (aged 78)
- Occupations: Actress, director

June Abbott (1942-2020) was an actress and director who founded the Courtyard Theatre and the Court Theatre Company.

== Early life and education ==
Born in Leeds, Abbott studied at the Royal Central School of Speech and Drama.

== Career ==
Her early acting roles were in repertory theatre. Abbott appeared in television shows including Crossroads, Department S, Father, Dear Father and Bless this House. Her theatre work included The Mousetrap and Noel Coward's Private Lives. In 1967, she became a member of the Pembroke Players.

Abbott taught drama at the Coventry Centre for the Performing Arts and ran drama workshops for children. In 1980, she helped launch the professional fringe Court Theatre Company above the Finborough Arms pub, where she worked as both an actor and director.

Abbott established the Courtyard Theatre and the Court Theatre Training Company in 1989. In 2008, Abbott produced The Death of Margaret Thatcher at the Courtyard Theatre. The play explored imagined reactions to Margaret Thatcher's death and was performed while she was still alive.

Keen to support emerging talent, Abbott organised the Court Showcase which provided an opportunity for recent graduates to share their skills. Abbott launched the King’s Cross Award for New Writing in 2003.
