= Louise N'Jie =

Gambian politician

Louise Antoinette N'Jie, MBE (née Mahoney; 23 January 1922 – 22 May 2014) was a Gambian teacher, feminist and politician who was the first woman to serve as a cabinet minister in The Gambia.

== Early life and education ==
Louise Antoinette Mahoney was born in Bathurst (now Banjul) in British Gambia on 23 January 1922, the third of five children. Her father, Sir John Mahoney, was of Aku descent and was the first Speaker of the National Assembly of the Gambia and her mother, Hannah, was the first Gambian woman to work as a clerk in the Government Secretariat in the 1910s. Her younger sister Augusta was the first female candidate to stand in a Gambian national election and later married Gambia's first President, Sir Dawda Jawara. Her brother John later married Florence Mahoney, the first Gambian woman to obtain a PhD.

N'Jie attended the Methodist Girls High School in Banjul, obtaining the Cambridge School Certificate in 1942. She then won a scholarship to attend the Achimota School in Accra, Ghana from 1942 until 1945, where she trained as a teacher. From 1963 to 1964, she studied educational administration at the University of Oxford.

== Career ==
N'Jie taught in various primary and secondary schools in Gambia for ten years and was principal of Bakau Primary School from 1957 until 1963.

In 1953, she was one of five female members of a 34-member consultative committee to Governor Sir Percy Wyn-Harris on constitutional reform. In 1958, she was appointed to the Committee for the Preparation of the Royal Visit and the Reception of Queen Elizabeth II to The Gambia in 1961. In 1960, she participated in the United Nations Seminar on Participation of Women in Public Life in Addis Ababa. In 1970, she was one of the founders of the Federation of Gambian Women.

N'Jie was a member of the People's Progressive Party and was elected to parliament in 1977, becoming Gambia's second female MP. She was also the only Christian member of the government at the time. She was appointed a parliamentary secretary in 1979, and in January 1985, became Minister of Youth, Sport and Culture, making her Gambia's first female member of cabinet. She oversaw an increase in the education of girls and a 20 percent increase in the number of female teachers. She served in this role until 1987, when she became Minister of Health, Environment, Labor and Social Welfare. She championed family planning and education to reduce the maternal mortality rate, and initiated Gambia's response to the AIDS epidemic in 1987 with the establishment of a National AIDS Control Program. She also oversaw the implementation of a cost recovery program in accordance with the Bamako Initiative adopted by African Health Ministers in 1987 to accelerate primary healthcare.

N'Jie was a member of the PPP's Central Committee and led the formation of a Women's Bureau. In 1989, she led a delegation to Havana to the World Conference on Women. She founded and led the Soroptimist Society and was president of the Gambia Red Cross Society for ten years. In 1991, she was one of the few PPP members to encourage party leader Dawda Jawara to retire.

N'Jie retired from politics in 1992. She died on 2 May 2014 in Bakau.

== Personal life ==
N'Jie married Denis Ebrima N'Jie, the Gambia's first dental surgeon, in the United Kingdom in 1950 and they had one son who died in 1997. She was a committed Christian and active in local churches throughout her life.

== Awards and honours ==
N'Jie was made a Member of the Order of the British Empire in June 1963. In 2015, on the fiftieth anniversary of Gambia's independence from Britain, she was named by The Standard as one of "50 prominent Gambians who helped to shape the nation."
