= Department S (TV series) =

British spy-fi TV series (1969–1970)

- Genre: Spy-fi; Action/adventure
- Created by: Dennis Spooner; Monty Berman
- Developed by: Dennis Spooner
- Starring: Peter Wyngarde; Joel Fabiani; Rosemary Nicols; Dennis Alaba Peters
- Theme music composer: Edwin Astley
- Composer: Edwin Astley
- Country of origin: United Kingdom
- Original language: English
- No. of series: 1
- No. of episodes: 28

Production
- Producer: Monty Berman
- Cinematography: Frank Watts; Brian Elvin
- Running time: 49 mins
- Production company: ITC production

Original release
- Network: ITV (ATV)
- Release: 9 March 1969 – 4 March 1970

Related
- Jason King

Department S is a British spy-fi adventure series, produced by ITC Entertainment. It consists of 28 episodes which originally aired in 1969 and 1970. It stars Peter Wyngarde as author Jason King (later featured in spin-off series Jason King), Joel Fabiani as field investigator Stewart Sullivan, and Rosemary Nicols as computer expert Annabelle Hurst. These three are agents for a fictional special department (the "S" of the title) of Interpol. The head of Department S is Sir Curtis Seretse (Dennis Alaba Peters).

== Production ==
"When a case proves too baffling for the minds of Interpol, they turn to the talents of Department S."; from the ITC trailer for the series.

The series was created by Dennis Spooner and Monty Berman, although neither wrote any of the episodes, which were instead scripted by ITC regulars such as Terry Nation and Philip Broadley. Many of the directors on the show had also worked on other ITC shows such as The Saint, Danger Man and Randall and Hopkirk (Deceased).

The series was shot on 35mm colour film and designed, like all ITC's film productions, to fit the United States commercial format. Although episodes begin with a cold open (after the 'S' logo is shown), unusually, the episode title, writer and director credits appear on screen before the opening title sequence, though after the theme tune has started. With a few exceptions, the principal cast is always studio-bound. Some exteriors are represented by studio buildings, while the rest are mainly shown in second-unit footage using doubles where necessary. Outside locations were, in common with similar series, largely restricted to the Hertfordshire countryside in the vicinity of Borehamwood. At least one foreign location was used, featuring Peter Wyngarde on the streets of Vienna. Otherwise, foreign locations are usually established by the use of stock footage.

The distinctive opening and closing credits were designed by Chambers and Partners who also worked on other similar series such as The Baron and Randall and Hopkirk (Deceased). The music was composed by Edwin Astley.

== Synopsis ==
Department S is a division of Interpol headed by international bureaucrat Sir Curtis Seretse (Dennis Alaba Peters). Its headquarters are in Paris and its members investigate international cases that other crime agencies cannot solve. The plots focused on bizarre discoveries such as a plane which lands at Heathrow Airport with no pilot or passengers ("One of Our Aircraft Is Empty") or a Government official whose chauffeur finds him transformed into a skeleton ("The Bones of Byrom Blain").

The team itself is led by American former FBI agent Stewart Sullivan (Joel Fabiani), who takes direction from Seretse. Outside of his FBI experience, little is known about Stewart except that he is pragmatic and hands-on, and does much of the leg-work, confronting the criminals.

Jason King (Peter Wyngarde) is the ideas man, but also helps in the field. He is an adventure novelist who uses details from their cases to write his novels. The living he makes writing novels affords him a hedonistic lifestyle, and he is often seen with "beautiful" women though he has no permanent love interest in the series; in one episode he mentions he is a widower whose wife was killed in a plane crash. Jason King also serves as comic relief in the series, especially in scenes of hand-to-hand combat where he winds up being subdued as often as he prevails.

Annabelle Hurst (Rosemary Nicols) is a computer expert and analyst as well as a field investigator. She sometimes appears in seductive, glamorous disguises, and is shown in her underwear in the first episode or later taking a bubble bath. There are ongoing hints of romantic interest between Stewart and Annabelle during the series.

== Cast ==
- Peter Wyngarde as Jason King
- Joel Fabiani as Stewart Sullivan
- Rosemary Nicols as Annabelle Hurst
- Dennis Alaba Peters as Sir Curtis Seretse

== Episodes ==
Filming took place between April 1968 and June 1969.

The air dates are for ATV Midlands. ITV regions varied date and order.

The production numbers here refer to ITC synopsis guide numbers and the sequence in the Network DVD booklet.

No.	Title	Directed by	Written by	Original release date	Prod. code
1	"Six Days"	Cyril Frankel	Gerald Kelsey	9 March 1969	4006
When an aircraft goes missing for six days and the crew members and passengers (including Department S boss Sir Curtis Seretse) have no recollection of events, Annabelle and the team investigate. Guest Cast: Bernard Horsfall, Peter Bromilow, Tony Steedman, Geraldine Moffat, Peter Bowles, John Gabriel, Marion Mathie, Al Mancini, Geoffrey Chater, Charles Houston
2	"The Trojan Tanker"	Ray Austin	Philip Broadley	16 March 1969	4004
A crashed tanker has had a room built inside, which contains an unconscious girl; she disappears before help arrives. Department S investigate why. Guest Cast: Patricia Haines, Simon Oates, Bill Nagy, Fredric Abbott, Michael Balfour, John Serret
3	"A Cellar Full of Silence"	John Gilling	Terry Nation	23 March 1969	4003
Department S is called in after four men wearing fancy dress are found executed in a cellar. Guest Cast: Paul Whitsun-Jones, Denise Buckley, Robin Hawdon, Brandon Brady, Edward Brayshaw, Brian Oulton, Frank Forsyth
4	"The Pied Piper of Hambledown"	Roy Ward Baker	Donald James	30 March 1969	4002
When an entire village disappears overnight except for one girl, Department S is called in. Guest Cast: Richard Vernon, Gina Warwick, Jeremy Young, Peter Lawrence, Stanley Beard, John Kelland
5	"One of Our Aircraft Is Empty"	Paul Dickson	Tony Williamson	6 April 1969	4007
An airliner lands at Heathrow but the crew and passengers are missing. (Made back-to-back with "Six Days"). Guest Cast: Anton Rodgers, Basil Dignam, Gillian Lewis, Angela Lovell, John Gabriel, Edina Ronay, Robert Russell, Janet Key, Roger Avon
6	"The Man in the Elegant Room"	Cyril Frankel	Terry Nation	13 April 1969	4001
When a dead girl and a demented man are found in a room constructed inside a disused factory, Department S investigates. Guest Cast: Toby Robins, Stratford Johns, Michael Robbins, John Hallam, Tony Caunter, Frank Gatliff, Peter Reynolds, Martin Boddey, Juliet Harmer
7	"Handicap Dead"	John Gilling	Philip Broadley	20 April 1969	4005
A tournament golfer found dead on a beach leads Department S into the world of gold bullion smuggling. Guest Cast: Neil McCallum, Dawn Addams, Dudley Sutton, John Bailey, Norman Eshley, Brian McDermott, Jennifer Clulow, Neal Arden
8	"A Ticket to Nowhere"	Cyril Frankel	Tony Williamson	27 April 1969	4017
A disappearing scientist and the death of a financier are linked, but Jason and Stewart keep forgetting about the case, to the despair of Annabelle. Guest Cast: Fiona Lewis, Bridget Brice, Michael Gwynn, Alan Wheatley, Neil McCarthy, Juliet Harmer, John Steiner
9	"Black Out"	Ray Austin	Philip Broadley	17 September 1969	4009
A chef and food critic is found unconscious in the Mexican desert and cannot recall the last three days. Is there a connection to the American space programme? Guest Cast: Neil Hallett, Sue Lloyd, Richard Caldicot, David Sumner, Paul Stassino, Caron Gardner, Mark Singleton, Michael Mellinger
10	"The Double Death of Charlie Crippen"	John Gilling	Leslie Darbon	24 September 1969	4010
An assassination attempt leaves only a dummy as the victim; Department S has to discover who the real target is. Guest Cast: Peter Arne, Edward de Souza, John Savident, Yolande Turner, Veronica Carlson, Michael Godfrey, Hana Maria Pravda, George Pravda, Gertan Klauber, Ernst Walder
11	"Who Plays the Dummy?"	John Gilling	Tony Williamson	1 October 1969	4013
When a car crashes and the sole occupant is a dummy in the driving seat, Department S follows the trail to an imminent attack on NATO senior officers. Guest Cast: Alan MacNaughtan, Kate O'Mara, George Pastell, John Bindon, Patrick Waddington, William Kendall
12	"The Treasure of the Costa del Sol"	John Gilling	Philip Broadley	8 October 1969	4008
Two dead fisherman and their haul of plastic fish containing $100,000 lead to a master criminal with a side line as a painter and engraver. Guest Cast: George Pastell, Isla Blair, John Louis Mansi, Peter Thomas, David Prowse, June Abbott, Olivia Hamnett, Peter J. Elliott
13	"The Man Who Got a New Face"	Cyril Frankel	Philip Broadley	15 October 1969	4011
Department S investigates when a man is found dead with a clown's mask glued to his face, and the trail leads to a vicious vendetta. Guest Cast: Alexandra Bastedo, Adrienne Corri, Eric Pohlmann, Arnold Diamond, William Wilde, Nik Zaran, Clifford Earl
14	"Les Fleurs du Mal"	Cyril Frankel	Philip Broadley	22 October 1969	4014
Three plastic flowers contain a coded message that will lead to the proceeds of a bank robbery, but there are interested parties ready to kill for the flowers. Guest Cast: Donal Donnelly, Michael Gothard, Alex Scott, John Tate, Edina Ronay, Joanna Vogel
15	"The Shift That Never Was"	John Gilling	Donald James	25 October 1969	4012
With one exception, every member of staff of a chemical factory takes the day off sick. The one man who went to work is murdered; the trail leads to a beauty parlour and a nuclear power station. Guest Cast: James Kerry, Caroline Blakiston, Eric Lander, Eddie Byrne, Toke Townley, John Horsley, Anthony Dutton, Leslie Schofield
16	"The Man from X"	Gil Taylor	Tony Williamson	5 November 1969	4019
A man clad in a spacesuit staggers in a London street; unable to remove the jammed helmet, he suffocates. Department S investigates; the only clue is the man has slight radiation burns and had been in a vacuum. Guest Cast: Wanda Ventham, John Nettleton, Duncan Lamont, Tony Selby, Stanley Lebor
17	"Dead Men Die Twice"	Ray Austin	Philip Broadley	12 November 1969	4016
Department S finds that a 'dead man' can die twice when a man is murdered twice three years after his double had been murdered. Guest Cast: Kieron Moore, Barbara Murray, Alan Lake, David Bauer, Edward Caddick, John Cater, Steve Plytas, Ricardo Montez
18	"The Perfect Operation"	Cyril Frankel	Leslie Darbon	26 November 1969	4021
A surgeon performing a delicate brain operation on a senior British civil servant is forcibly removed; another surgeon enters and completes the operation, saving the man's life. Department S investigates the only surgeon capable of doing the operation, but he is Russian and too old. Guest Cast: Harold Kasket, Cyril Luckham, Ronald Radd, Jean Marsh, Francesca Tu, Basil Dignam, Martin Miller, Marne Maitland, Ronald Leigh-Hunt, Philip Locke
19	"The Duplicated Man"	Paul Dickson	Harry W. Junkin	3 December 1969	4022
A double agent is killed, but is he really dead after he has spent ten years cultivating a second identity to escape from his masters? Department S investigates, closely followed by enemy agents. Guest Cast: Robert Urquhart, Ann Bell, Guy Deghy, Sarah Lawson, Basil Dignam, Winifred Evans, Oliver MacGreevy, Constantine Gregory, Edward Cast
20	"The Mysterious Man in the Flying Machine"	Cyril Frankel	Philip Broadley	10 December 1969	4023
A man is found murdered in a mock-up aircraft in a warehouse. The team wonder why anybody should go to so much trouble. A message left scrawled on their car is the only clue. Guest Cast: Hans Meyer, Clinton Greyn, Virginia North, Sue Gerrard, Antony Scott
21	"Death on Reflection"	Ray Austin	Philip Broadley	17 December 1969	4020
Sir Curtis Seretse, head of Department S, is astonished to see a mirror sell at auction for four times its value; when the buyer is murdered, he asks the team to investigate. Guest Cast: Guy Rolfe, Jennifer Hilary, Peter Copley, Paul Whitsun-Jones, Michael Barrington
22	"Last Train to Redbridge"	John Gilling	Gerald Kelsey	14 January 1970	4015
Multiple murders on a tube train lead Department S to criminal speculators attempting to tap the hot line between the US President and the UK Prime Minister. Guest Cast: Leslie Sands, Patricia English, Derek Newark, Harvey Hall, Tommy Godfrey, Inigo Jackson, Neal Arden, Frank Forsyth, Victor Brooks, Roger Avon
23	"A Small War of Nerves"	Leslie Norman	Harry W. Junkin	21 January 1970	4026
A fanatical scientist who has developed a deadly nerve gas threatens to wipe out London unless governments take notice and agree to live in peace. Guest Cast: Eleanor Summerfield, Anthony Hopkins, Frederick Jaeger, Colin Gordon, Brian Worth, Larry Martyn, Nosher Powell
24	"The Bones of Byrom Blain"	Paul Dickson	Tony Williamson	28 January 1970	4027
A chauffeur arrives at his destination only to discover his passenger has disappeared, leaving only his skeleton behind. Department S investigates and discovers the chauffeur's skeleton; the same fate awaits Sir Curtis Seretse and Jason King. Guest Cast: John Carson, John Baron, Patrick Barr, Gerald Campion
25	"Spencer Bodily is Sixty Years Old"	Leslie Norman	Harry W. Junkin	11 February 1970	4024
Spencer Bodily is dead; he looks 20 but must be at least 60, and there is no record he ever existed. The body disappears, and Department S suspects there could be more cases of 'eternal youth'. Guest Cast: Patricia Donahue, Iain Cuthbertson, Warren Stanhope, Bob Sessions, Garfield Morgan, Barry Andrews, Richard Heffer, Hilary Pritchard, Milton Reid
26	"The Ghost of Mary Burnham"	Cyril Frankel	Harry W. Junkin	18 February 1970	4018
John Burnham is tormented by the ghost of his wife shortly after she is shot and killed. He is a brilliant economist and someone is trying to unbalance him to prevent him taking an important job. Department S has to find out why before he is driven insane. Guest Cast: Donald Houston, Lois Maxwell, Norman Bird, Anthony Nicholls, Weston Gavin, Susan Fleetwood, Ron Pember, Ellis Dale
27	"A Fish Out of Water"	Cyril Frankel	Philip Broadley	25 February 1970	4025
When an Interpol agent is found dead, Jason King is sent to take over his mission to crack an international drug ring. Jason realises he has been identified and his life is in danger. Stewart and Annabelle are sent to back him up. Guest Cast: Magda Konopka, Lee Montague, Cyril Shaps, Wolfe Morris, John Cazabon, Yuri Borienko
28	"The Soup of the Day"	Leslie Norman	Leslie Darbon	4 March 1970	4028
When a crate of soup is stolen from a bonded warehouse, Department S suspects smuggling; but when the team locates the stolen soup cans, all are intact and contain only soup. Is it a case of double-cross? Guest Cast: Isobel Black, Michael Coles, Ronald Lacey, Anthony Valentine, John Ronane, Patrick Mower, Peter Arne, David Healy, Sandor Eles, Robert Cawdron

== Re-runs ==
A repeat run of Department S began on ITV4 in November 2005, alongside others of a large number of similar ITC productions. Episodes of Department S screened on London Live TV channel in the London area in March–April 2022. Rewind Television DTT channels in the United Kingdom started broadcasting the series in December 2024.

== Home media ==
The first two episodes of Department S were released on DVD in Britain by Carlton Television (now part of ITV plc). Department S was released on DVD in Australia by Umbrella Entertainment in a box set. This version is in PAL with no region code. Network released the series on DVD in the United Kingdom featuring many exclusive extras, including commentaries and part of a documentary series also covering Jason King: Wanna Watch a Television Series? Chapter One: Variations on a Theme.

Department S first appeared in high definition on Blu-ray as a single episode on Retro Action Volume 1 released by the Network imprint on 19 September 2011. This contained the episode "A Small War of Nerves", which features Anthony Hopkins.

Volume-by-volume release of the entire series in new high-definition transfers on Blu-ray began in 2017, with the first available on 27 February. There are six volumes in total; the first two each contain four episodes, the next four contain five episodes each.

A complete box set of the entire series was released in Blu-ray on 2 October 2017, coded for all three regions.

== See also ==
- Grim's Dyke – house & filming location
