= Grace Nambatya Kyeyune =

Ugandan scientist

- Born: 1962 (age 63–64); Ssaza, Masaka District, Uganda
- Citizenship: Ugandan
- Education: Makerere University (BSc in Chemistry) (Postgraduate Diploma in Education); Loughborough University (MSc in Medicinal Chemistry) (PhD in Medicinal Chemistry)
- Occupations: Medicinal chemist, researcher and academic
- Years active: 2000–present
- Title: Director of research at the Natural Chemotherapeutics Research Institute (NCRI), Kampala, Uganda
- Spouse: Dr. Robert Kyeyune
- Children: 5

Grace Nambatya Kyeyune (née Grace Nambatya) (born April 1962) is a Ugandan medicinal chemist, researcher and academic, who serves as the director of research at the National Chemotherapeutic Research Institute (NCRI), based in Kampala, Uganda's capital city. According to its website, NCRI is a state-owned "research and development institute in natural products and traditional and complementary health systems". As of July 2021, Nambatya is credited with developing five compounds, currently in clinical and public use, which are extracted from Ugandan plants and herbs.

== Background and education ==
Nambatya was born in April 1962 to Mary Perepetwa Sonko and Charles Sonko of Ssaza, Masaka District, in the Buganda Region of Uganda. She attended primary school in the greater Masaka area. She then transferred to Trinity College Nabbingo, in present-day Wakiso District, where she completed both her O-Level and A-Level studies.

Nambatya was admitted to Makerere University, where she obtained a Bachelor of Science degree in Chemistry, followed by a Postgraduate Diploma in Education. Later, she obtained a Master of Science degree in Medicinal Chemistry, followed by a Doctor of Philosophy in the same field, both awarded by Loughborough University in the United Kingdom.

== Career ==
Starting circa 2000, Nambatya has been studying and promoting indigenous herbal medication, working with Ugandan communities, herbalists and western medical practitioners. She is credited with being the driving force behind the Indigenous and Complementary Medicine Bill of 2015.

Nambatya's research is credited with bringing several compounds to market during the COVID-19 pandemic. These include the following:

UBV-01N

A natural formulation developed by Nambatya and her team at NCRI. Since January 2021 it is undergoing human clinical trials at Mulago National Referral Hospital.

Excel Sanitizer

The formulation contains Warburgia ugandensis, which is both antibacterial and antifungal.

Warbugia Herbal Cough Syrup

Under development as a cough remedy for COVID-19 patients.

NCRI Immuno Booster

An organic drink under development to fortify body immunity to resist infections in general and viral attacks, in particular.

== Family ==
Nambatya is married to Robert Kyeyune and together, they are the parents of five children.

== Other considerations ==
Nambatya lectures I nchemistry at the College of Natural Sciences and pharmacy at the College of Health Sciences, both at Makerere University, the oldest and largest public university in Uganda.

She also sits on the board of the National Drug Authority, since 2008. She is the chair of the Public Private Partnership for Health (PPPH) Working Group. She is also a member of the Top Management Team at the Uganda Ministry of Health, answerable directly to the Permanent Secretary.
