= Chaff on the Wind =

- Author: Ebou Dibba
- Publication date: 1986

Chaff on the Wind (1986) is the first novel by Gambian author Ebou Dibba. Set in the Gambia, it was published by Macmillan Education. Some of the characters reappear in his second novel, Fafa.

== Reception ==
In Dibba's obituary, The Guardian commended his "strong sense of period, with an awareness of African culture confronted with colonial reality". Regarding Chaff on the Wind specifically, the article noted that it was "set in the 1930s, before Ebou was born, but it has an almost psychic feeling of what it was like at that time".

== Plot summary ==
Two young men, Dinding and Pateh, travel by ship from a rural village to the main city. Pateh is outgoing and reckless, with an eye for the ladies. Dinding is socially cautious, but sensible and possessing of business acumen. In the city, Dinding meets a young man, older than himself but not yet middle-aged, named James. James is a Christian and a very serious person. He becomes a major influence on Dinding.

Pateh gets a job on the loading docks, and seduces a young girl named Isatou. Pateh is fond of fine and showy clothes. To maintain his clothing budget and his schedule with the ladies, Pateh begins working as a smuggler.

Later, Isatou marries Charles, an old man who had never married before. He is the cousin of a Signare. Isatou does not feel close to Charles. After their marriage, Isatou finds herself pregnant with Pateh's child. The pair chooses to flee to Senegal. Dingding continues to prosper in business, and Pateh goes to work for Dinding. Pateh and Isatou become parents. While the child is still an infant, a French colonial policeman confronts Pateh with evidence of Pateh's criminal activities. Pateh sets the evidence on fire. During a fight with the policeman, the officer strikes a mortal blow. Pateh dies with his family by his side.
