= The Second Round (novel) =

2024 novel by Lenrie Peters

The second round
- 1965 edition
- Author: Lenrie Peters
- Language: English
- Genre: Poetry, fiction
- Publisher: Apollo
- Publication date: 1 Mar. 2024
- Publication place: Sierra Leonean
- Pages: 256
- ISBN: 978-1803289106

The Second Round is an English language novel by Sierra Leonean-Gambian writer and poet Lenrie Peters. The novel is Peters's first and only novel. The novel was first published in 1965, and subsequently reprinted in 1966 as part of the influential Heinemann African Writers Series. The novel is semi-autobiographical, following the experience of a western educated doctor, Dr. Kawa, who returns to Freetown to practise medicine.

Critics describe the novel as reflecting the concerns of the post-colonial African community, nationalism, westernization, the difficulty adjusting to returning to Africa from abroad, and the "ethos" of Freetown society at the time. The novel has overt Pan-Africanist political themes, juxtaposes the "black world versus the European". The book also describe characters in terms of Jungian psychology. Charles Larson called the novel "African Gothic", though this characterization was criticized by reviewer Omolara Leslie in Black World.

The novel has been compared to Chinua Achebe's No Longer at Ease and the works of fellow Gambian-born Sierra Leonean William Conton.
