= Ebou Dibba =

Gambian writer (1943–2000)

Ebou Dibba MBE
- Born: Ebrima Dibba; 10 August 1943; Bathurst, The Gambia
- Died: 29 December 2000 (aged 57); England
- Education: University College, Cardiff; King's College London
- Occupations: Novelist and teacher
- Notable work: Chaff on the Wind (1986)

Ebou Dibba, MBE (10 August 1943 – 29 December 2000), was a Gambian novelist and a teacher.

== Biography ==
Ebrima "Ebou" Dibba was born in Bathurst (now Banjul), capital of the Gambia, where he was raised in the prevalent Wolof culture to which his mother belonged, although his father's family was from Baddibu, a Mandinka area up-river. Dibba attended the Gambian Methodist high school and was an exceptionally bright student — the first Gambian to earn three A-levels.

He won a scholarship to University College, Cardiff, in the late 1960s, "at a time when Neil Kinnock was president of the students' union", as Kaye Whiteman notes. Dibba studied French classical literature, and took a year out teaching English in Toulon, France, before graduating with a B.A. in French Literature. He earned his M.A. degree from King's College London, and subsequently worked as a teacher at an adult education centre in Muswell Hill, north London, in the early 1970s, and at a drug clinic, as well as helping at a youth club in Kilburn.

In 1974 he moved to the adult education center at Bletchingley, Surrey, initially to teach modern languages and organise classes for the disadvantaged; then from 1975 he served as the centre's director for much of the next two decades, during which period he also wrote two novels, published in the 1980s. Engaging wholeheartedly with the home counties community, "he saw his role as that of a missionary for African culture" and seemed to take it as a personal blow when the job came to an end in 1993. That same year, Dibba was made a Member of the Order of the British Empire (MBE).

Dibba moved on to a life in nearby Edenbridge, Kent, but died in 2000, aged 57, survived by four children from two marriages.

== Writing ==
Dibba was the first Gambian author to have used the Gambian setting in his writing. His literary career was marked by the publication in 1980 by Longmans of his 40-page novella for young adults, Olu and the Smugglers.

His first novel, Chaff on the Wind, was published in 1986. Set in the Gambia in the 1930s, as World War 2 approaches, it has been called "a tenderly written portrait of a time and a place hardly ever represented in African literature". The story of some of the characters in Chaff on the Wind is continued in Dibba's second novel, Fafa.

== Selected works ==
- Olu and the Smugglers – young adult novella (Longmans, 1980)
- Chaff on the Wind (Macmillan Education, 1986)
- Fafa (Macmillan Education, 1989)
- Alhaji (Macmillan, 1992)
