= Sally Singhateh =

Gambian poet and novelist

Sally Sadie Singhateh (born 1977) is a Gambian poet and novelist.

== Biography ==
While interning at the Foundation for Research on Women's Health, Productivity and the Environment (BAFROW), she published several articles in The Voice of Young People Magazine, published by BAFROW and aimed at young people. In 1995, she won Merit's International Poetry Award.

Singhateh earned a Bachelor of Arts in Communication and was in the process of earning a Master of Arts in Contemporary Literature in 2004. At the University of Wales, Swansea. At BAFROW, an organization that campaigns against female genital cutting in The Gambia, she worked in public relations around 2008. She then worked at the Gambian office of UNESCO, also in public relations, from 2009.

== Works ==
=== Novels ===
- Christie's Crises, 1988
- Baby Trouble, Nairobi
- The Sun Will Soon Shine, London: Athena Press, 2004
