= Florence Mahoney =

Gambian academic (born 1929)

- Born: Asi Florence Kezia Omolara Peters; 6 January 1929 (age 97); Bathurst, Gambia (now Banjul, The Gambia)
- Education: Westfield College (now Queen Mary, University of London); St Hilda's College, Oxford; School of Oriental and African Studies (SOAS), University of London
- Occupations: Author and historian
- Known for: First Gambian woman to obtain a PhD (SOAS, 1963)
- Spouse: Dr John Mahoney
- Children: 3 sons: Omotunde, Sola and Ayodeji Mahoney
- Relatives: Lenrie Peters (brother) and Dennis Alaba Peters (brother)

Florence Mahoney (née Asi Florence Kezia Omolara Peters; born 6 January 1929) is a Gambian Creole, or "Aku", author and historian, and was the first Gambian woman to be awarded a PhD.

== Background and early life ==
Florence Mahoney was born in 1929 in Bathurst, Gambia, to Lenrie Ernest Ingram Peters (1894–14 February 1968) and Kezia Rosemary. Lenrie was a Sierra Leone Creole, while Rosemary was a Gambian Creole or Aku. Because Gambian Creoles, or Akus, are descendants of Sierra Leonean Creoles who worked and settled in The Gambia, Mahoney has ties on both sides to Sierra Leone.

The Peters family was of West Indian or, more likely, Nova Scotian Settler descent (making them descendants of the original black American founders of the 1792 Freetown settlement and possibly direct descendants of Thomas Peters himself). The family was also related to the prominent Sierra Leonean Creole Maxwell family that produced Joseph Renner Maxwell, the first African graduate of the University of Oxford, and the son of a colonial chaplain. Florence was one of five children – including the late Dr Lenrie Peters and actor Dennis Alaba Peters – whose parents had met in the 1920s and married within the same decade. Her father, Lenrie Ingram Peters, was a graduate of Fourah Bay College and because of that institution's affiliation with Durham University in England was also a graduate of the latter university. Peters was the longest serving editor for the Gambian Echo and a staunch advocate for the rights of indigenous Gambians. He was a pan-Africanist and used to read poetry to Lenrie Jr. as a child.

== Education ==
Mahoney attended St. Mary's Anglican Primary (1935–39) and then the Methodist Girls' High School (now Gambia Senior Secondary School) (1939–44) and passed her Senior Cambridge School Certificate. She was then sent to St Elphin's Boarding School for girls in Derbyshire, England. After finishing, she attended Westfield College (now Queen Mary, University of London) and received a bachelor's degree with honours in History in 1951. Mahoney went on to attend the University of Oxford's St Hilda's College, where she obtained a postgraduate degree in Education in 1952. She later studied at the School of Oriental and African Studies (SOAS), University of London, where she obtained a PhD in History in 1963 with her dissertation "Government and Public Opinion in the Gambia, 1816–1914". Mahoney was the first Gambian woman ever to be awarded a PhD.

== Return to the Gambia and educationalist work ==
In 1953, she returned to the Gambia and married Dr John Mahoney Jr (1919–2012). Dr John Mahoney was the son of Sir John Mahoney, a member of an influential and prominent Gambian Creole family that was active in colonial politics. Dr John Mahoney's sister, Hannah Augusta Darling Mahoney, married Sir Dawda Kairaba Jawara, the first leader of the Gambian Republic following independence on 18 February 1965.

In 1972, Florence Mahoney was made a "Fulbright Professor of African history" and she has lectured at Spelman College, Atlanta, Georgia. In 1973, she returned to the Gambia but shortly thereafter she went back to the United States, in March 1974, to lecture at the Pacific School of Religion in Berkeley, California. She taught "History and Religion", before rejoining her husband in Congo Brazzaville after her classes had ended.

She is the author of four books: Stories of Senegambia (1982), The Liberated Slaves and the Return to Africa (2001), Creole Saga: The Gambia's Liberated African Community in the Nineteenth Century (2007), and the essay collection Gambian Studies.

== Family ==
Florence Mahoney has three sons – Omotunde, Sola and Ayodeji – from her marriage to Dr John Andrew Mahoney (1919–2012).

== Selected works ==
- Stories of Senegambia (1982)
- The Liberated Slaves and the Return to Africa (2001)
- Creole Saga: The Gambia's Liberated African Community in the Nineteenth Century (2007)
- Gambian Studies (2008)

== Sources ==
- Isatou Bittaye, "Gambia: Encounter With Dr. Florence Mahoney, a Historian" (interview), Foroyaa Newspaper (Serrekunda), 2 July 2010. Via AllAfrica.
- Hassoum Ceesay, "Tribute to a Great Gambian historian: Dr Florence Mahoney at 80", The Point, 30 January 2009.
- Ruby Lerina Agnes Peters obituary notice, Daily Observer Gambia, 3 June 2008, via Africa.gm.
- Cherno Omar Barry, "Gambia: A Literary Giant Has Fallen", Foroyaa Newspaper (Serrekunda), 8 June 2009. Via AllAfrica.
- "Adieu Lenrie Peters", The Point, 28 May 2009.
- Rose Marie Beck & Frank Wittmann, African media cultures: transdisciplinary perspectives
- "Dr. Florence Mahoney" at SheAwards.
