= Charles R. Larson (scholar) =

American literary scholar (1938–2021)

- Born: Charles Raymond Larson; January 14, 1938; Sioux City, Iowa, United States
- Died: May 22, 2021 (aged 83); Chevy Chase, Maryland, United States
- Education: University of Colorado
- Occupations: Literary scholar, anthologist
- Known for: A founder of African literature studies in the U.S.
- Spouse(s): Roberta Rubenstein, m. 1971
- Children: 2

Charles Raymond Larson (January 14, 1938 – May 22, 2021) was an American scholar of literature, particularly of African literature. He published a number of anthologies of African literature, as well as literary criticism, and is seen as one of the founders of the study of African literature in the United States.

== Biography ==
Charles Raymond Larson was born on January 14, 1938, in Sioux City, Iowa. He attended the University of Colorado and studied English literature, receiving a BA in 1959 and an MA in 1961. He taught throughout his studies: high school in Burlington, Iowa (1959–1960) and Englewood, Colorado (1961–1962), and as an instructor at the University of Colorado (1961–1962).

In 1962, Larson joined the Peace Corps. He did not wish to fight in the Vietnam War and joined the Peace Corps to receive a draft deferment. He ended up teaching at Oraukwu Grammar School, in southeastern Nigeria, for two years, right after the country had become independent. The syllabus for literature, set by the new government, listed only the canonical greats of English literature: Shakespeare, Hardy, Milton, Bunyan. As Larson wrote later, this soon changed following significant growth in the number of English-language books published by Nigerian authors. In Nigeria he first became interested in African literature, which was then not easily available in the US. At the time, he was familiar only with Chinua Achebe's Things Fall Apart and Amos Tutuola's The Palm-Wine Drinkard, but his experience in Nigeria was life-changing, and made him realize that his education had failed him: not only had he never been taught African literature, but he "had never read any work by a minority writer", as he later said.

On his return to the US, he entered the doctoral program at Indiana University, studying comparative literature, and attained his PhD in 1970. During his PhD program he again taught at Colorado (1965), then at American University in Washington, D.C. (1965–1967), and Indiana University (1967–1970). After he received his PhD he became professor in the literature department at American University, in 1970; he became full professor in 1974, and department chair in 2002. His classes on African literature at AU were among the first offered on writers from Africa to students in the US, and "he helped secure a place in American academia for writers including Achebe and Wole Soyinka".

== Editorship and scholarship ==
Larson is considered one of the founders of the study of African literature in the United States. He was general editor for the series "Collier Af/Am Library", published by the US publishing house Collier. Between 1968 and 1972, thirty-eight books by African (but also African American and West Indian) writers were published in the series as affordable mass-market paperbacks.

Larson also edited and published "seminal" anthologies, including African Short Stories: A Collection of Contemporary African Writing (1970, republished as Modern African Stories by Fontana in 1971), Opaque Shadows and Other Stories from Contemporary Africa (1975, reprinted as More Modern African Stories), and Under African Skies: Modern African Stories (1997). His The Emergence of African Fiction (1972) discussed African novel writers and attempted to define an African aesthetic, and his The Ordeal of the African Writer (2001) discussed various challenges that African writers had to deal with, including problems with getting published and building a readership in Africa. Both books "championed" African writers. In American Indian Fiction (1978), Larson discussed Native American writers, and in Invisible Darkness: Jean Toomer and Nella Larsen (1993), he treated Jean Toomer and Nella Larsen, two important American writers from the Harlem Renaissance.

Larson's influence on the reading of African literature was reflected in his obituary: Gambian poet and prose writer Tijan Sallah called him "a brilliant intellectual" and "a great bridge builder across cultures", and said that The Emergence of African Fiction was a "trailblazer". American essayist and short story writer James Alan McPherson, cited in the same article, praised Opaque Shadows, as a "select[ion of] superb stories that focus, without self-consciousness or remonstration, on the human condition as it presently exists among a variety of African people". Larson's papers are held at the Harry Ransom Center, at the University of Texas at Austin.

== Personal ==
Larson was married on May 2, 1971, to Roberta Rubenstein, likewise a literature professor at American University, teaching modernism and contemporary writers, and co-editing the Worlds of Fiction anthology with him. They had two children; their daughter Vanessa is a copy-editor at the Washington Post; their son Josh is a psychotherapist in Denver, Colorado. Larson died on May 22, 2021, in Chevy Chase, Maryland, of prostate cancer.

== Publications ==
=== Academic ===
- Prejudice: Twenty Tales of Oppression and Liberation (1971)
- The Emergence of African Fiction (1972)
- The Novel in the Third World (1976)
- American Indian Fiction (1978)
- Worlds of Fiction (1993)
- Invisible Darkness: Jean Toomer and Nella Larsen (1993)
- The Ordeal of the African Writer (2001)

=== Anthologies ===
- African Short Stories: A Collection of Contemporary African Writing (1970, republished as Modern African Stories by Fontana in 1971)
- Opaque Shadows and Other Stories from Contemporary Africa (1975, reprinted as More Modern African Stories)
- Under African Skies: Modern African Stories (1997)

=== Fiction ===
- Academia Nuts (novel, 1977, satire)
- The Insect Colony (novel, 1978, "about an entomologist ensconced in a remote village in Cameroon")
- Arthur Dimmesdale (novel, 1983, "a retelling of The Scarlet Letter focused on the guilt-wracked minister")

== External collections ==
Larson Papers at the Harry Ransom Center
