= Paulin Joachim =

Beninese poet, journalist and editor (1931–2012)

Paulin Joachim (20 September 1931 – 24 November 2012), also known as Paulin Joachim Branco de Souza, was a Beninese poet, journalist, and editor, who later became a French citizen. He is known for his elegant language and was called "a legend of journalism in Africa".

== Biography ==
Born in Cotonou, Dahomey, Paulin was educated in several places including Lyon, France, and by 1971 was a French citizen. He also worked with French poet Philippe Soupault. After his graduation from the École supérieure de journalisme in 1958, he was recruited by Pierre Lazareff for France-Soir newspaper, which allowed him to follow political and intellectual debates on the eve of African independence.

Joachim's two volumes of poetry are Un nègre raconte in 1954 and Anti-grâce in 1967. He was political editor for France-Soir, an editor-in-chief for Bingo magazine, and manager for the African Décennie 2. He is also associated with David Diop. In 2006, he was among the laureates of the W. E. B. Du Bois Institute for the W. E. B. Du Bois medal.
