= Gambian Creole people =

Ethnic group of The Gambia

Gambian Creoles
Total population
- 1-2% of The Gambia's population

Languages
- Krio, English

Religion
- Anglican • Methodist • Catholic • Baptist

Related ethnic groups
- Americo Liberians, African Americans, Black British, Gold Coast Euro-Africans, Sierra Leone Creoles, Afro-Caribbeans

The Gambian Creole people, or Krio or Aku, are a minority ethnic group of Gambia with connections to and roots from the Sierra Leone Creole people. In Gambia the Aku account for about 2% of the population. Some estimates put the figure higher. However, according to the 2013 Gambian Census, the Aku make up 0.5% of the population or around 8,477 people.

== Origins ==
Gambian Creoles are the descendants of Sierra Leoneans of Nova Scotian, Jamaican Maroon and Liberated African ancestry, who migrated to the Gambia, along with liberated Africans released in the Gambia directly.

Gambian Creoles are partly an extension of the Sierra Leone Creole community, and some Gambian Creoles have roots in the West Indies, North America, England, and various Bantu African communities. Some Gambian Creoles also have some European heritage through intermarriage and through their connections to Sierra Leone Creoles who settled in the Gambia between the late nineteenth and early twentieth centuries.

Historical population
Year	Pop.	±%
1973	5,596	—
1983	10,741	+91.9%
1993	7,458	−30.6%
2003	24,492	+228.4%
2013	8,477	−65.4%
Population Change

== Language ==
Many Gambian Creoles speak the Krio language, an English-based creole also spoken by Sierra Leonean Creoles and which, like other varieties of West African Pidgin English originated as a language of contact between colonizing British and African slave traders for the transatlantic slave trade. Krio is spoken by 96 percent of Sierra Leone's population, especially in their trade and social interaction between ethnic groups.

== Aku Marabouts ==
In Sierra Leone, the term 'Aku Marabout' or 'Aku Mohammedan' refers to the Oku people, while in the Gambia, the term 'Aku' refers to the Creole people, who are Christians residing mainly in and around Banjul. The Aku Marabout people of the Gambia are a non-Creole migrant community descended from the Oku people of Sierra Leone.

== Notable Gambian Creole people ==
This is a list of notable Gambian Creole people.

- Belinda Bidwell, first female speaker of the National Assembly of The Gambia
- Mark Bright, sports correspondent and former footballer
- Crispin Grey-Johnson, current Secretary of State for Higher Education of the Gambia
- Augusta Jawara (née Mahoney), was a nurse, playwright, women's rights activist and former first lady
- Julia Dolly Joiner, politician and Commissioner of Political Affairs for the African Union
- Joshua King, Norwegian footballer
- Florence Mahoney, author, historian, and first Gambian woman to be awarded a PhD
- Basiru Mahoney, lawyer and Judge
- Dej Mahoney, legal and business consultant
- Louise N'Jie, teacher, feminist and first woman to serve as a cabinet minister in The Gambia
- Lenrie Peters, surgeon, novelist, poet and educationist
- Edward Francis Small, trade unionist, nationalist and pan-Africanist
- Susan Waffa-Ogoo, politician and former Minister of Foreign Affairs
- John Carew
- Nicolas Jackson
- Ebrima Colley
- Omar Colley
- Lamin Colley

== Sources ==
- http://today.gm/hi/arts/the_aku.html
- http://www.accessgambia.com/information/aku.html
