= Mariama Khan =

Gambian filmmaker, poet, cultural activist and scholar

- Born: 1977 (age 48–49)
- Citizenship: Gambian
- Occupations: filmmaker, poet, cultural activist
- Notable work: Sutura: Rape and Justice in Senegal

Mariama Khan (born 1977) is a Gambian filmmaker, poet, cultural activist and scholar. She teaches African civilization and Women in African Society at Lehman College in New York.

== Life ==
Mariama Khan was born in 1977 to a Senegalese father and a Gambian mother. She grew up in Brikama New Town in the Kombo Central district of The Gambia.

Khan started making short documentary films as a student of Henry Felt at Brandeis University. She made four documentaries in 2008–9. Sutura won a UNFPA award, and The Journey Up The Hill was premiered at Cinekambiya International Film Festival in 2016.

In the Gambia, Khan worked as acting and later director of the Policy Analysis Unit in the Office of the President. President Yahya Jammeh appointed her secretary-general of Gambia's civil service in 2010, though the appointment only lasted a few months. She was then appointed permanent secretary at the Personnel Management Office.

In 2018 she wrote a public letter to President Adama Barrow, in defence of ASP Musa Fatty. Fatty, who was believed to be wrongly accused of shooting at youth, was one of five police officers initially charged with murder after the deaths of three young protestors at an anti-pollution rally in Faraba Banta.

== Books ==
- Futa Toro: poetry, 2003
- (with Bamba Khan) Juffureh : kissing you with hurting lips : poetry, 2004
- (With Bamba Khan) Proverbs of the SeneGambia
- "The Gambia-Senegal Border: Issues in Regional Integration", (Routledge, 2019)

=== Films ===
- Sutura: Rape and Justice in Senegal
- The Journey Up The Hill.
