= Augusta Jawara =

Gambian playwright and activist

Hannah Augusta Darling Jawara
- Born: Hannah Augusta Darling Mahoney; The Gambia
- Died: London, England
- Education: Mohammedan High School; Nursing training in Edinburgh
- Occupations: Nurse, playwright, activist
- Organization(s): Women's Contemporary Society; Gambia Women's Federation
- Known for: First woman to contest a Gambian national election
- Notable work: The African King (1966); Rebellion (1968)
- Political party: People's Progressive Party
- Movement: Women's rights movement
- Spouse: Dawda Jawara (m. 1955; div. 1967)
- Parent(s): Sir John Mahoney; Hannah Mahoney

Hannah Augusta Darling Jawara (née Mahoney; May 1924 – 21 January 1981), was a Gambian nurse, playwright and activist for women's rights. She was the first wife (from 1955 to 1967) of Sir Dawda Jawara, Prime Minister of the Gambia.

== Life ==
Hannah Augusta Darling Mahoney was born to a prominent Christian Aku Creole family. She was the daughter of Sir John Mahoney, the first Speaker of the Legislative Council of the Gambia, and his wife, Hannah. Augusta's sister was Louise N'Jie.

She studied at Mohammedan High School, where she first met her future husband, (future president) Dawda Jawara, before training in nursing in Edinburgh, Scotland.

In February 1955, she married Dawda Jawara. Their first child was born in Edinburgh, where her husband had returned to study. In 1960, she stood for election to the House of Representatives in the 1960 elections, contesting Soldier Town in Bathurst unsuccessfully for her husband's party, the PPP. She thereby became the first woman candidate to stand in a Gambian national election.

In 1962, she established the Women's Contemporary Society. Her play, The African King, was produced at the Negro Arts Festival in Dakar in 1966.

In 1967, she and Dawda Jawara divorced, and he reconverted to Islam. In 1968, she published Rebellion - "perhaps the first avowedly feminist, pro-girl child book in The Gambia's literary history and tradition". Published under a pseudonym, Rebellion was a play about Nyasta, a teenage girl in a rural village who struggles to continue her education rather than suffer an arranged marriage. At the time it was published, she was President of the Gambia Women's Federation, which she helped to establish from women's associations in the Greater Banjul Area.

== Death ==
Augusta Jawara died in London on 21 January 1981, aged 56.

== Works ==
Gambian nurse

=== Plays ===
- The African King, produced 1966.
- Rebellion, 1968

=== Other ===
- "The Gambia Women's Federation", Women Today, Vol. 6, No. 4 (1965), pp. 79–81.
