= Dennis Alaba Peters =

Gambian actor (1927–1996)

- Born: 1927; The Gambia
- Died: 1996 (aged 68–69)
- Education: Guildhall School of Music and Drama
- Occupations: Actor (film, TV)
- Years active: 1964–73
- Television: Department S

Dennis Alaba Peters (1927–1996) was a Gambian actor who worked in the United Kingdom. He is known for his portrayal of Sir Curtis Seretse in the TV series Department S (1969–70).

== Early life ==
Dennis Alaba Peters was born in The Gambia. Peters was the son of a successful newspaper publisher Ingram Peters, and Rosemary Kezia, both from Sierra Leone. He was the youngest of five children; his siblings included Dr Lenrie Peters (1932–2009), a surgeon, poet and novelist.

He studied Economics at the University of Cambridge. Before finishing his studies, Peters left Cambridge to attend the Guildhall School of Music and Drama to study voice instead. His switch to Guildhall was against his father's wishes, and his family stopped supporting him. In need of employment, Peters became a BBC reporter. Upon graduation from Guildhall School of Music and Drama, he appeared in operas. He eventually concentrated entirely on acting. He was active during the 1960s and early 1970s.

== Sir Curtis Seretse ==
Little background information describes the character of Sir Curtis Seretse in the Department S television series. The character heads Department S of Interpol and team leader Stewart Sullivan reports directly to him. The show left his role in Interpol undefined, but his contacts include senior members of NATO and the United Nations. Sir Curtis has access to information that the Department S team does not (for instance in the episode "Last Train to Redbridge"). He has a mostly hands-off approach to managing, but can become accidentally ("Six Days") or personally involved ("The Bones of Byrom Blain", "Death on Reflection"). He may exercise authority, standing Sullivan down for becoming too emotionally involved ("A Fish Out of Water").

Casting Peters, a black African, as a sophisticated and urbane senior diplomat, was extremely uncommon in 1960s television. Though the significance of Lieutenant Uhura, a character with a leading and central role in Star Trek: The Original Series being portrayed by an African American actress drew much commentary, this was not the case with Sir Curtis. In a 2008 documentary about the series, Kate O'Mara stated that she believed casting Peters in an authority role "did a lot for the black community in the acting world".

== Death ==
Peters died in the US in 1996.

== Filmography ==
- 1964: Once a Spy... (as Police Capt)
- 1965: The Curse of Simba (as Saidi)
- 1966: The Defiant Ones (as cast member)
- 1967: The White Bus (as Mr Wombe)
- 1967: Goodbye, Nobby Clarke (as Kanaro)
- 1968: Praise Marx and Pass the Ammunition (as Reporter)
- 1969–70: Department S (28 episodes, as Sir Curtis Seretse)
