= Lenrie Peters =

Gambian surgeon and writer (1932–2009)

- Born: Lenrie Leopold Wilfred Peters; 1 September 1932; Bathurst, The Gambia
- Died: 27 May 2009 (aged 76); Dakar, Senegal
- Education: Trinity College, Cambridge; University College Hospital
- Occupations: Surgeon, poet
- Relatives: Florence Mahoney (sister) and Dennis Alaba Peters (brother)
- Writing career
- Notable work: The Second Round

Lenrie Leopold Wilfred Peters (1 September 1932 – 28 May 2009) was a Gambian surgeon, novelist, poet and educationist.

== Biography ==
Peters was born on 1 September 1932 in Bathurst (now Banjul) in The Gambia. His parents were Lenrie Ernest Ingram Peters and Kezia Rosemary. Lenrie Sr. was a Sierra Leone Creole of West Indian or black American origin. Kezia Rosemary was a Gambian Creole of Sierra Leonean Creole origin. Lenrie Jr. grew up in Bathurst and moved to Sierra Leone in 1949, where he was educated at the Prince of Wales School, Freetown, gaining his Higher School Certificate in science subjects.

In 1952 he went up to Trinity College, Cambridge, to read Natural Sciences, graduating with a BSc degree in 1956; from 1956 to 1959 he worked and studied at University College Hospital, London, and 1959 was awarded a Medical and Surgery diploma from Cambridge. Peters worked for the BBC from 1955 to 1968, on their Africa programmes.

While at Cambridge University he was elected president of the African Students' Union, and interested himself in Pan-Africanist politics. He also began writing poetry and plays, as well as starting work on his only novel, The Second Round (published by Heinemann in 1965). Peters worked in hospitals in Guildford and Northampton before returning to the Gambia, where he had a surgical practice in Banjul. He was a fellow of the West African College of Surgeons and the Royal College of Surgeons in England.

Peters was President of the Historic Commission of Monuments of the Gambia, was president of the board of directors of the National Library of the Gambia and The Gambia College from 1979 to 1987, and was a member and President of the West African Examination Council (WAEC) from 1985 to 1991.

He died in Dakar, Senegal, on 27 May 2009, aged 76.

== Published works ==
=== Poetry ===
Lost Friends

- 1964: Poems (Ibadan: Mbari Publications)
- 1967: Satellites (London: Heinemann, African Writers Series No. 37)
- 1971: Katchikali (London: Heinemann, African Writers Series No. 103) ISBN 0-435-90633-X ; ISBN 0-435-90103-6
- 1981: Selected Poetry (London: Heinemann, African Writers Series No. 238) ISBN 0-435-90238-5
- 1984: A New Book of African Verse

=== Novels ===
- 1965: The Second Round (London: Heinemann, African Writers Series No. 22) ISBN 0-435-90022-6

== Relevant literature ==
- Elimimian, Isaac I. "Contemporary Africa in Lenrie Peters’poetry." In The Humanities and the Dynamics of African Culture in the 21st Century, edited by John Ayotunde, Isola Bewaji, Kenneth W. Harrow, Eunice E. Omonzejie, and Christopher E. Ukhun, (2017): 277–285. Cambridge Scholars Press.
