= Ahmadiyya in the Gambia =

Islamic movement

Ahmadiyya in The Gambia is part of the worldwide Ahmadiyya Muslim Jama'at under the leadership of the Ahmadiyya Caliphate. Ahmadiyya teachings entered Gambia during the era of the Second Caliphate through the flow of Ahmadiyya literature and a number of traders returning to the country. The first missionary to enter the country was Alhaji Hamza Sanyaolo, a Nigerian who entered in 1959. After a number of months he was followed by Gibriel Saeed, a Ghanaian missionary. Since its earliest history in the Gambia, the community has been facing resistance and religious intolerance from certain Muslim clerics and Islamic bodies in the country.

== History ==
=== Early contact ===
Ahmadiyya entered Gambia during the era of the Second Caliphate through the flow of Ahmadiyya literature and a number of traders returning to the country, perhaps from Nigeria. In the early 20th century, the Muslim Congress of Gambia generally considered itself to be responsible for the advancement of Islamic education among the country's populations. In view of the supremacy of the Christian missionary activity in the colony, a small group of people from Bathurst, now Banjul, began to feel that the Congress was lacking diligence in its efforts. As a consequence, by 1952 the group formed Jama’at ul-Muiminin (Community of Believers). Within a period of a few years, a large number of its members became Ahmadi Muslims as a tribute to traders and the flow of Ahmadiyya literature into the colony. The group established an Arabic school and desired that a Pakistani Ahmadi teacher, Mubarak Ahmad Saqi, then a missionary in Sierra Leone, be employed. Despite a formal request in February 1953, the colony's Executive Council did not give permission for a Pakistani to enter. As a result, the group employed a Senegalese member of the Tijaniyyah Sufi tariqa under a provisional basis. Due to financial constraints, however, the school closed down within a year.

In the following years repeated attempts were made to permit Pakistani Ahmadi teachers or missionaries to enter the colony. In 1955, Nur Muhammad Nasim Saifi attempted to revive Saqi's case. The Fazl Mosque in London requested Hugh Linstead, a British Member of Parliament to write to the authorities to overturn the decision made in the colony. An alternative candidate, Muhammad Ishaq Sufi, a pioneering missionary stationed in Liberia was also offered on whose behalf it is stated that a petition with 250 signatures from Ahmadi Muslims of Banjul was prepared. After holding two sessions in consultation with the Muslim members of the colony's Legislative Council, the government once again blocked the Ahmadi Muslim missionary of Pakistani heritage. As a consequence, Saifi consulted another British politician Fenner Brockway and made another failed attempt in 1958. Finally, a Nigerian Ahmadi missionary was prepared for the Gambia.

=== Early development ===
Locations of the first two Ahmadi Muslim mosques constructed in the 1960s

In 1959 Alhaji Hamza Sanyaolo, a Nigerian missionary arrived in Gambia and served for a period of a few months before a Ghanaian missionary, Gibriel Saeed replaced him. However, it was not until a year later on March 10, 1961 did the first Pakistani missionary, Chaudhry Muhammad Sharif, was permitted to enter the colony. Sharif served in Bathurst until January 23, 1963. It was during Sharif's period in the Gambia, through another Ahmadi missionary, Alhaji Ibrahim Jikineh, that Muhammad Farimang Singhateh accepted Islam Ahmadiyya, who was to later become the Governor General of the Gambia. Singhateh was also the national president of the Ahmadiyya Muslim Community of the Gambia. When on July 5, 1966, Singhateh became the governor, he was the first Ahmadi Muslim head of any state or colony in the history of the Ahmadiyya movement. Following his appointment, he wrote a letter to the Caliph III requesting a piece of cloth of Mirza Ghulam Ahmad, the founder of the Ahmadiyya movement. For Ahmadi Muslims this was the first time in the history of the Community that the prophecy of Mirza Ghulam Ahmad, "I shall bless you so much so that kings shall seek blessings from thy garments", was literally fulfilled.

It was in the early 1960s that the first group of Ahmadi Muslim Gambians were sent to be trained as missionaries in order to serve in the Gambia. The first Ahmadi mosque in the country was built in 1963 and another one four years after its independence, in Farafenni, in 1969.

=== Journeys by caliphs ===
The first Ahmadi Muslim caliph to visit the Gambia was Caliph III, Mirza Nasir Ahmad, whose visit in 1970 was instrumental in the launch of the Nusrat Jahan Scheme which has been responsible for the establishment of a number of schools in the country. On May 1, 1970 the Caliph arrived in Banjul, for a five-day visit, as part of his tour of West Africa. As part of his visit the Gambia, the caliph met Dawda Jawara, the then President of the Gambia, and a number of other public figures.

== Modern status ==
Before the Ahmadiyya Muslim Community was permitted to establish itself in the country, various successful attempts were made in the late 1950s to prevent Ahmadi Muslim missionaries of Pakistani heritage to enter, in what was then a colony of the British Empire. As a consequence, the Community arranged Nigerian and Ghanaian missionaries. It was after a number of years, in 1961 that a Pakistani missionary was permitted to enter the colony.

In the fall of 2014, a leading Gambian Muslim cleric, Alhaji Abdoulie Fatty, who was also the Imam of the State House of the Gambia at that time, called for the expulsion of Ahmadi Muslims from the country. Having described Ahmadi Muslims as non-Muslims, he called for a ban on the propagation of Ahmadiyya teachings in the Gambia. Following his comments, Fatty was fired as the Imam of the State House. It has been speculated that the dismissal is attributed to his comments concerning the Ahmadiyya Muslim Community, which the Imam denies. In January 2015, the Gambia Supreme Islamic Council aired on state television its decision to declare the Community, as a non-Muslim group. The move was condemned by Baba Trawally, the Amir (National President) of the Ahmadiyya Muslim Jama'at The Gambia and Demba Ali Jawo, former president of the Gambia Press Union.

== See also ==
- Religion in the Gambia
- Islam in the Gambia
- Christianity in the Gambia
