= First Lady of the Gambia =

Spouse of the President of the Gambia

- Incumbent; Fatoumatta Bah-Barrow since January 19, 2017
- Residence: State House, Banjul
- Inaugural holder: Kathleen Audrey Paul
- Formation: February 18, 1965

The First Lady of the Gambia is the official title of the wife of the President or Head of State of The Gambia. Since January 19, 2017, Fatoumatta Bah-Barrow has been First Lady.

Since polygamy (or more precisely polygyny) is legal and widespread in Gambia, several heads of government were married several times. However, only one wife bears the title of First Lady at a time. When he took office in 2017, President Adama Barrow decreed that only his first wife, Fatoumatta Bah-Barrow, would be designated as first lady.

== List of first ladies ==
=== Parliamentary monarchy (1965–1970) ===
On February 18, 1965, the former British colony of Gambia gained complete independence as a parliamentary monarchy. The head of state was still the Queen of the Gambia, British Queen Elizabeth II, who was represented in the Gambia by the Governor-General.

The head of government during this period was Dawda Jawara (the prime minister from 1962 to 1963 and prime minister from 1963 to 1970).

Portrait	Name	Term Began	Term Ended	Governor-General	Notes
	Kathleen Audrey Paul (née Weeden) (d. 2004)	February 18, 1965	February 9, 1966	Sir John Warburton Paul (1916–2004)	It is not known whether Kathleen Paul was called first lady.
	Fanta Singhateh (1929–2023)	February 9, 1966	April 24, 1970	Sir Farimang Singhateh (1912–1977)	Farimang Singhateh was the first Governor-General with Gambian citizenship. His wife Fanta Singhateh was called first lady.

=== Republic (from 1970) ===
Portrait	Name	Term Began	Term Ended	President or Head of State	Notes
	Chilel Jawara (née N'Jie) (b. circa 1952)	April 24, 1970	July 22, 1994	Dawda Jawara (1924–2019)	Dawda Jawara was married to his first wife, Augusta Jawara (1924–1981), from 1955 until their divorce in 1967, before he took office as president. In March 1968, he married Chilel Jawara, his second wife, who became first lady in 1970. In 1970, he married a third wife, Njaimeh Jawara (b. c. 1947), a sister of Lamin Bora M'Boge, who is not referred to as the First Lady.
	Tuti Faal (b. circa 1952)	September 1994 (marriage)	1998 (divorce)	Yahya Jammeh (b. 1965)	Jammeh married his first wife, Tuti Faal, but they divorced in 1998.
	Zeinab Jammeh (née Soumah) (b. circa 1952)	December 1998 (marriage)	January 19, 2017	Yahya Jammeh	In December 1998, Jammeh married Zineb Jammeh. Jammeh later married Alima Sallah, daughter of Gambian diplomat Omar Gibril Sallah, in September or October 2010. However, he publicly announced that Zineb Jammeh remained the official First Lady.
	Fatoumatta Bah-Barrow (née Bah) (b. 1974)	January 19, 2017	Present	Adama Barrow (b. 1965)	Fatoumatta Bah-Barrow married Adama Barrow on March 20, 1997. Adama Barrow is also married to a second wife, Sarjo Mballow-Barrow. When he took office in 2017, he decreed that Fatoumatta Bah-Barrow would be the First Lady.
