= Islam in the Gambia =

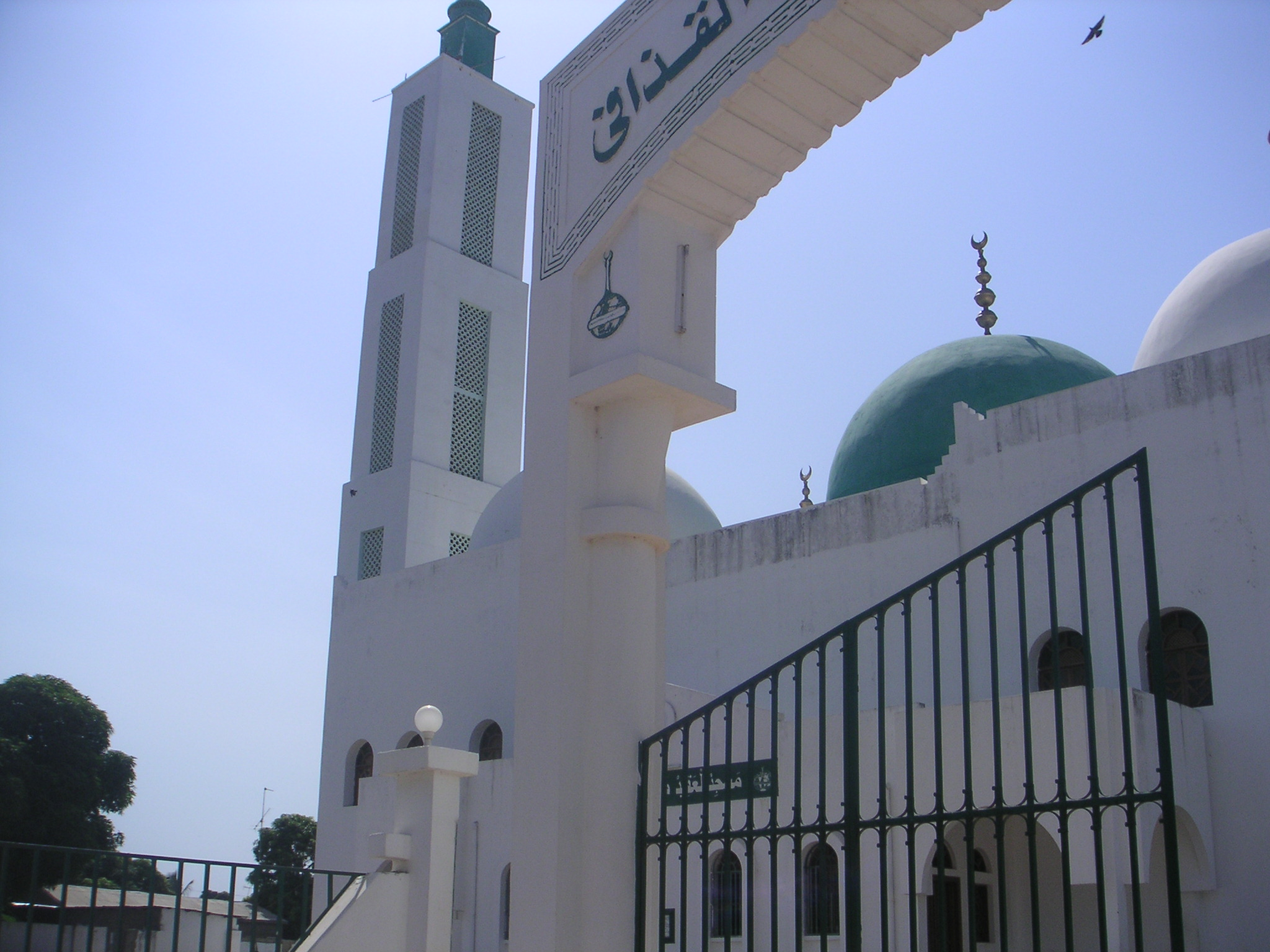
A mosque in the Gambia

Islam is the major religion in the Gambia, representing 95.7% of the 2 million population, with the first Muslim communities in the country arriving in 11th century. Islam has therefore had an influence on the Gambia throughout history, and continues to impact its culture, society and politics. The majority of The Gambia's Muslims are Sunni belonging to the Maliki school of jurisprudence, influenced with Sufism. There is a smaller Shiite community, largely stemming from Lebanese and Arab migration. The Ahmadiyya movement is also present. Other religious societies exist in the country, including Catholics, Protestants, Hindus and Traditional African religions.

== History ==
=== Pre-colonial era ===
Evidence of Islam in the Gambia exists from as early as the 11th century, stemming from the arrival of North African Muslim merchants. Following centuries of increasing influence, especially brought on by Islamic scholars, Islam became the major religion in the country in the 19th century. The Soninke-Marabout wars (1850), a series of jihads, led by the Marabou sect resulted in most of the Soninke Gambians (the traditional religious adherents) converting to Islam.

=== Gambia Colony and Protectorate ===
In the early 20th century, the influence of Islam continued whilst the Gambia was part of the British Empire . In 1905, British rule granted the establishment of an Islamic court and appointed a Qadi official to officiate over Gambian Muslims. The Islamic courts ensured a formalized justice system, especially when compared to the traditional, pre-colonial court procedures, which were far less codified. However, the Supreme Court of the Gambia, controlled by British colonials, did on some occasions overturn decisions made by the Qadi.

=== 1965–present ===
The Gambia gained independence from British rule in 1965, initially as a constitutional monarchy, before becoming a republic within the Commonwealth of Nations in 1970. The country has remained secular in principle. It has only been served by three presidents since 1970, namely, Sir Dawda Jawara (1970 – 1994), Yahya Jammeh (1994 – 2017) and Adama Barrow (2017 – present).

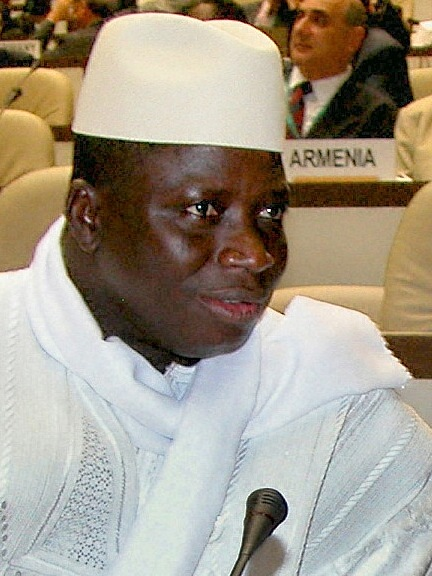
Yahya Jammeh served as president from 1996 to 2017

Jawara became the country's first president in 1970, after serving as prime minister from 1962, when the country was granted self-governance (before full independence). Following his death in 2019, he was recognized by the New York Times for “promoting tolerance, human rights and the rule of law”. Jawara was born a Muslim, although converted to Christianity in 1955, before reconverting back to Islam in 1965.

Jawara's presidency came to an end in 1994, following a successful coup d’état, led by Yahya Jammeh, who subsequently led the country until 2017 as a dictator. Under his dictatorship, the country was declared an “Islamic republic” in 2015, although this was reversed in 2017 by the then new president, Adama Barrow.

== Culture ==
The Gambia has a diverse array of traditional cultural practices, stemming from the various ethnic groups that make up the population. The country maintains strong links to traditional music, such as the Sabar drum and traditional cuisine, including the national dish, Domodah. However, Islam has influenced some cultural practices.

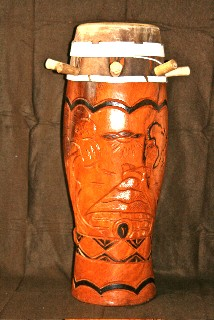
A traditional West African sabar (drum), still played in the Gambia

=== Dress code ===
Despite declaring the Gambia an “Islamic republic”, in 2015, the then President Jammeh, maintained that no dress code would be enforced and that citizens would still have the right to practice any religion freely. However, one month after the statement was made, Jammeh placed stricter regulations on clothing, “ordering female government employees to wear headscarves at work”. He then reversed the directive, lifting the dress code restriction shortly after it was imposed.

=== Marriage ===
The Gambia, in line with Islamic Sharia law, allows the practice of polygamy. Both ex-President Jammeh and current President Barrow have practiced polygamy.

In 2016, Jammeh announced a ban on child marriages. At the time of the announcement, 30% of girls under the age of 18 were married.

=== Depictions in popular culture ===
Islam in the Gambia has had minimal coverage in popular, western culture, however, was portrayed in Alex Haley's 1976 novel, Roots: The Saga of an American Family, the subsequent miniseries, Roots, and the film Roots: The Gift. The story's plot focuses on Haley's great-great-great-great-grandfather, Kunta Kinte, a Gambian Muslim born in 1750. Kunta is presented as having had an idyllic childhood, educated in Islam, before being captured in 1767, and sold into slavery in Virginia. The novel tells the story of Kunta's life in enslavement, a key aspect of which was his Islamic faith, which throughout the novel, never leaves him. Despite criticism over the historical accuracy of Haley's research, the novel has played an important part in investigating African and Islamic history in America. In The Oxford Companion to African American Literature, the impact of Kunta Kinte is assessed:

"Roots provoked a renewed interest by Americans in their own genealogy and instilled a new pride for African Americans about their African history"

== Society ==
=== Education ===
The role of Islam in Gambian society was evident even during colonial rule, specifically through the creation of an Islamic school, the ‘Muhammadan School’, which combined both Islamic and Western pedagogies. Indeed, since independence, numerous Islamic schools of thought have established educational institutions. Islam's impact on education was further demonstrated in 1990, when the national curriculum included Islamic studies as a compulsory subject.

=== Social issues ===
==== Women's rights ====
In 2015, President Jammeh, announced a ban on female genital mutilation, stating that the practice was not required in Islam. At the time of the announcement it was estimated that 76% of Gambian women had had the procedure. At the time of the announcement, 30% of girls under the age of 18 were married.

==== LGBT rights ====
Homosexual activity is illegal in the Gambia and there is no legal recognition of same-sex relationships. In 2008, Jammeh instructed gay and lesbians to leave the country, and said that he would “cut off the head” of any gay man found in the Gambia. With regard to the impact of Islam on the rights of the LGBT community, Jammeh was quoted as saying “The Gambia is a country of believers… sinful and immoral practices [such as] homosexuality will not be tolerated.” He made similar comments in 2015, warning that he would “slit your throat” if you were found to be homosexual in the Gambia.

=== Broader society ===
In her book, ‘Culture, Religion, & Democracy in The Gambia: Perspectives from Before and After the 2016 Gambian Presidential Election’ , Alieu B. Sanneh explores the relationship between religion and culture and the importance of these two concepts in informing a society. Specifically, Sanneh writes, “The Gambia has demonstrated an intricate pattern of blending cultural practices with Islamic religious beliefs”. This is demonstrated by the incorporation of a traditional xiin drum, similar to the Sabar, into the culture of the Baye Fall subsect of the Mouride Islamists in the Gambia and Senegal, as adherents play it whilst walking the streets and begging for alms.

However, the Gambia has also demonstrated a sense of societal independence and interpretations of Islam, demonstrated by the response to Jammeh's aforementioned dress code directive in 2016, in which women were told to wear headscarves in the workplace. Notably, the directive was lifted after resistance from within Gambian society, including, activists and pro-democracy groups.

The role of Islam in Gambian society is not fixed and often depends on the individual. In Marloes Janson's monograph, ‘Islam, Youth and Modernity in the Gambia: the Tablighi Jama’at, the author writes about the influence of the Tablighji Jama’at (an Islamic missionary movement).

“Secular oriented youth… condemn the jama’at... because it prevents them from pursuing a youthful lifestyle…because it leaves them with a sense of guilt at not being able to live up to Islamic principles. Moreover… the Jama‘at stands for a ‘foreign’ form of Islam that does not fit with local culture and traditions."

=== Islamic movements ===
==== Ahmadiyya ====
The Gambia has historically been viewed as a society that is receptive to people of different religious faiths. As a result, other religious movements, such as the Ahmadiyya Islamic missionary movement have experienced some prominence in the country and success with regards to gaining adherents. An example of such prominence, is the fact that the Ahmadis were the first Muslims in West Africa to set up schools that taught both religious perspectives as well as providing secular education. The Ahmadiyya movement's rise in prominence was especially visible in the 1960s. Sir Farimang Mamadi Singateh, (1912–1977) was president of the Gambia's Ahmadiyya community. He became the first Ahmadi to serve as the head of any state or colony, following his appointment as the second and last Governor-General of the Gambia, after the country was granted independence within the Commonwealth of Nations as a constitutional monarchy in 1965.

Despite the prominence of Ahmadiyya in The Gambia, the religious movement has not been accepted across all regions of Gambian society. In a separate interview conducted in her 2013 monograph,‘Islam, Youth and Modernity in the Gambia: the Tablighi Jama’at, Janson spoke to a Gambian man who, "decided to become an Ahmadi, much to the dissatisfaction of his relatives, most of whom broke off contact with him."

In 2014, one year after Janson published ‘Islam, Youth and Modernity in the Gambia: the Tablighi Jama’at', then President Jammeh's personal advisor and an Imam of the State House of the Gambia, Abdoulie Fatty called for the expulsion of Ahmadi Muslims and Ahmadiyya teachings in the Gambia to be banned. Shortly after his comments were made, Fatty was dismissed as Imam of the state house, although insisted that his dismissal was unrelated to the statements he made regarding Ahmadis.

The following year, in 2015, the Supreme Islamic Council of the Gambia declared Ahmadiddya non-Muslim. Some reports suggested that Jammeh may have been interested in claiming the movement's assets, including its numerous schools and hospitals, such as the large-scale hospital in Tallinding, Serrekunda.

==== Tablighi Jamaat ====
The Tablighi Jammat is an Islamic missionary movement that has experienced prominence in the Gambia, having first reached the country in the 1990s. Karamojo Dukureh is widely acknowledged as the founder of the Jamaat in The Gambia. In particular, the movement has appealed to youth in the Gambia, specifically middle-class Gambians in their twenties, who were secularly educated. Marloes Janson claims that the movement "provides Gambian youth with a new sense of belonging in that they see themselves as part of a global movement." As the Jamaat stems from South Asia, the Tablighi has resulted in a mergence of South Asian and West African cultures, especially as Pakistani preachers played a key role in starting the movement in the Gambia. A further impact of the Tablighi Jaamat, claims Janson could be a rebellion of young Muslims in Gambia against the older adherents of traditional Islamic schools of thought.

== Politics and judiciary ==
=== Domestic ===
Since gaining independence in 1965, the Gambia has been governed by 3 presidents, all of whom have been Muslims. Islam has thus had a significant impact on internal politics in the country, although to varying degrees, in an otherwise secular society.

Islam has impacted the judicial system of the Gambia since British colonial rule. The presence of Qadis (Islamic magistrates) in Muslim courts during colonialism recognised the importance of Islam in the domestic issues of Gambian Muslims.

Sir Farimang Mamadi Singateh, (1912–1977) became the first Ahmadi Muslim to serve as the head of any state or colony, following his appointment as the second and last Governor-General of the Gambia, after the country was granted independence as a constitutional monarchy in 1965.

Ex-president Jammeh's personal advisor Abdoulie Fatty, appointed shortly after his inauguration, was a Muslim scholar. Jammeh also built mosques in state institutions and had verses of the Qur’an inscribed on public buildings.

The Gambia Supreme Islamic Council, was established in 1992. It promotes Islamic ideals and sets the dates of Islamic holidays in the country.

=== Foreign affairs ===
Following Jammeh's military coup in 1994, many Western nations, including the U.S., cut their financial support of the Gambia temporarily. As a result, Islamic, Middle Eastern states established stronger ties with the country. Libya, in particular, is known to have funded an array of services, such as mosques, schools and hospitals.

In 2019, the Gambia filed a case against Myanmar's treatment of the Rohingya Muslim population to the UN, accusing the country of genocide.

The Gambia is also a member of the Organisation of Islamic Cooperation.

== See also ==
- Religion in the Gambia
- Ahmadiyya in the Gambia
- Christianity in the Gambia
