= Yawa =

Yawa may refer to:

== Language ==
- Yawa language (Papuan)
- Yawa languages (Austronesian)
- Gugu Yawa language, Australia
- Yahua language, Amazon

== People ==
- Xolile Yawa
- Yawa Hansen-Quao
- Tōsanjin Yawa

== Places ==
- Yawa, Central African Republic, a village in Lobaye Prefecture.

== Other ==
- Yawa Yawa
- YAWA, band
