= Chilel Jawara =

Former First Lady of the Gambia

Chilel, Lady Jawara

First Lady of the Gambia
- In office 24 April 1970 – 22 July 1994
- President: Dawda Jawara
- Preceded by: Fanta Singhateh
- Succeeded by: Tuti Faal

Personal details
- Born: Chilel N'Jie; 1952 (age 73–74)
- Spouse: Dawda Jawara (m. 1968; died 2019)

Chilel, Lady Jawara (née N'Jie; born 1952) is a former First Lady of the Gambia and widow of the late President Sir Dawda Jawara.

== Biography ==
Chilel Jawara is the daughter of the wealthy businessman Momodou Musa N'Jie (c. 1914–1990), a member of the Toucouleur people. Her father was a supporter of Pierre Sarr N'Jie's United Party (UP). After his daughter's marriage to Jawara, he became a supporter of the People's Progressive Party (PPP).

While still attending Gambia High School (now known as Gambia Senior Secondary School), she married Gambian Prime Minister and later President Dawda Jawara (1924–2019) in March 1968 at the age of 16. Her husband had previously been married to Augusta Jawara (1924–1981) from 1955 until they divorced in 1967. At her husband's side, she was the First Lady of the Gambia from 1970 to 1994. She had at least eight children with him. The Gambia politician Fatoumatta Njai is her niece.

In 1978, the Gambian ferry Lady Chilel Jawara was named after her.

In 1981, during the coup attempt led by Kukoi Samba Sanyang, Chilel Jawara was rescued by either the British Special Air Service or, according to other sources, the Senegalese military, from the coup plotters who had held her hostage for almost one week.

Chilel Jawara accompanied her husband on trips abroad, including to China in 1975 and 1991, and South Korea in 1984.

In 1993, she received the Grand Cross of the Order of Prince Henry from the President of Portugal.

In 2018, she celebrated her 50th wedding anniversary with her husband. Former President Dawda Jawara died on 27 August 2019.
