= Ellen Johnson Sirleaf Presidential Center for Women and Development =

African organization for women and development

The Ellen Johnson Sirleaf Presidential Center for Women and Development, also known as the EJS Center, is an organization to encourage and develop women in leadership roles in Africa. Founded by the former Liberian president Ellen Johnson Sirleaf in 2018, the organization aims "to be a catalyst for change across Africa, by helping unleash its most abundant untapped power – its women".

Ophelia Weeks, ex-President of the University of Liberia, was appointed as the center's first executive director.

== Amujae Initiative ==
The center launched its flagship program, the Amujae Initiative, at the Farmington Hotel in Margibi County on International Women's Day in March 2020. 'Amujae' means "we are going up" in Liberian dialect, and the initiative aims to prepare women for promotion to leadership positions across Africa.

In 2020, Joyce Banda of Malawi and Catherine Samba-Panza of Central African Republic helped Johnson Sirleaf with the Amaujae Initiative, 15 women were chosen as the inaugural cohort of participants to receive mentorship. They were:

1. (Ghana) Zanetor Agyeman-Rawlings, MP, doctor and activist
2. (Rwanda) Clare Akamanzi, CEO, Cabinet minister and lawyer
3. (Sierra Leone) Yvonne Aki-Sawyerr, mayor of Freetown
4. (Nigeria) Hadiza Bala Usman, managing director of the Nigerian Ports Authority
5. (The Gambia) Oley Dibba-Wadda, president and CEO of the Gam Africa Institute for Leadership (GAIL)
6. (Liberia) Kula Fofana, president of People's Foundation Africa
7. (Ghana) Yawa Hansen-Quao, executive director and social entrepreneur
8. Malado Kaba, Guinea's first female finance minister
9. (Liberia) Cornelia Kruah-Togba, NGO founder, public servant and women's advocate
10. (Zimbabwe) Fadzayi Mahere, lawyer, advocate, lecturer and political leader
11. (Ivory Coast) Aida Alassane N'Diaye-Riddick, development expert and public servant
12. (Nigeria) Angela Nwaka, nurse, consultant, legislator and NGO director
13. (Nigeria) Jumoke Oduwole, academic, government advisor, and advocate
14. (Tanzania) Upendo Furaha Peneza, MP and advocate
15. (Ethiopia) Blen Sahilu, human rights lawyer and gender expert

In 2021, 15 women across 11 African countries were chosen:

1. (Nigeria) Teju Abisoye, development expert, lawyer and youth advocate
2. (Ghana) Farida Bedwei, tech entrepreneur and disability rights advocate
3. (Ethiopia) Dagmawit Moges Bekele, Minister of Transport and Member of House of People's Representatives
4. (South Sudan) Susan Grace Duku, activist and refugee advocate
5. (Sierra Leone) Dr. Yakama Manty Jones, economist, lecturer, entrepreneur and philanthropist
6. (Sierra Leone) Isata Kabia, social entrepreneur, former MP and Minister
7. (Botswana) Bogolo Kenewendo, economist, former Minister and gender and youth activist
8. (Egypt) Ghada Labib, Deputy Minister and communications & IT expert
9. (Democratic Republic of the Congo) Angèle Makombo, political advisor and party leader
10. (The Gambia) Fatoumatta Njai, Parliamentarian, Women's Leadership Advocate
11. (Nigeria) Ifeyinwa Maureen Okafor, government advisor and corporate director
12. (Kenya) Umra Omar, humanitarian, community development strategist and gubernatorial candidate
13. (Nigeria) Dr. Adaeze Oreh, Doctor, healthcare advocate and author
14. (Liberia) Telia Urey, businesswoman, politician and activist
15. (Kenya) Anne Waiguru, economist and governor of Kirinyaga County.

2023 saw the third cohort which included:

1. (Liberia) Sona Traore Sesay Assistant Minister for Student Personnel Services, Former Executive Director
2. (The Gambia) Seregbe Keita Public Policy Analyst, and Development Expert
3. (The Gambia) Fatou Jagne Senghore led Article 19’s work in West Africa
4. (Zimbabwe) Joanah Mamombe MP, biologist
5. Chilando Nakalima Chitangala mayor of Lusaka, Zambia
6. (Zambia) Chipokota Mwanawasa Presidential policy adviser
7. (Namibia) Emma Inamutila Theofelus lawyer, member of Parliament, and the Minister of Information and Communication Technology
8. (Kenya) Gladys Wanga Governor of Homa Bay County
9. (Ghana) Grace Ayensu-Danquah MP, Professor and Deputy Minister of Health
10. (Malawi) Joyce Chitsulo MP, Deputy Minister
11. (Liberia) Moriah Kou Dwehde Yeakula lawyer, women’s rights activist
12. (Botswana) Peggy Onkutlwile Serame Minister of Finance

The fourth cohort, announced in 2025, contained thirteen women including:

1. (Egypt) Sahar Albazar, women's issues activist
2. (Rwanda) Patrice Uwase, Sustainable engineer
3. Rohey Malick Lowe, The Gambia’s first female mayor
4. (Sierra Leone) Haja Ramatu Wurie, Minister of Technical and Higher Education
5. (Tunisia) Aya Chebbi, The African Union’s first Special Envoy on Youth
6. (Liberia) Charlyne Mnamah-mar Brumskine Liberian lawyer and advocate
7. (Zambia) Kanungwe Chota Kanyanyamina Kanchibiya Town mayor
8. (South Africa) Mutshidzi Mulondo Dr for UNESCO
9. (Cameroon) Mylène Noubi Tchatchoua Magistrate auditor
10. (São Tomé and Príncipe) Edite Ramos da Costa Ten Jua Minister of Foreign Affairs et al
11. (Kenya) Gathoni Wamuchomba MP
12. (Nigeria) Uju Vanstasia Rochas-Anwukah public health and nutrition advocate

In 2025 Monica Geingos was the chair of the board of the Ellen Johnson Sirleaf Presidential Center in Liberia.
