= Mary Antoinette Brown-Sherman =

Liberian educator and academic administrator (1926–2004)

Mary Antoinette Brown Sherman (October 27, 1926 – June 3, 2004) was a Liberian educator, and the first woman to serve as president of a university in Africa.

== Early life and education ==
Mary Antoinette Hope Grimes was born in Monrovia, the daughter of Louis Arthur Grimes and Victoria Elizabeth Jellemoh. Her father was an Americo-Liberian, or Congo, government official who became Chief Justice of the Supreme Court of Liberia. Her brother Joseph Rudolph Grimes was Liberia's secretary of state from 1960 to 1972. Her mother was from the Vai ethnic group, and was raised in the household of Joseph J. Cheeseman, the twelfth president of Liberia. Mary Antoinette Grimes was also related to the 15th president of Liberia, Arthur Barclay, and the 18th president, Edwin Barclay. She wrote a history of her Barclay foremothers.

After completing undergraduate studies at Liberia College in 1947, Grimes earn a master's degree in teaching from Radcliffe College in 1949; she completed doctoral studies in education at Cornell University in 1967. Her dissertation was titled "Education and national development in Liberia, 1800-1900."

== Career ==
In 1950, Sherman joined the education faculty at the University of Liberia. Mary Antoinette Brown was appointed Dean of the Teachers' College at the University of Liberia in 1958, and later vice president for academic affairs (1975-1978). She was president of the University of Liberia from 1978 to 1984. During her tenure as president, the university saw expanded facilities and programs, and improved scholarship funding. She also worked on behalf of faculty members against government interference.

In 1980, President Samuel K. Doe attempted to appoint Sherman as his secretary of education, but she declined the offer. In 1984, Sherman was dismissed from the university after the Liberian Army violently invaded the campus, and effectively shut down the school for several years. She relocated to the United States in 1986, where she helped to found the University of Liberia Alumni Association. She also wrote a biography of her mother, published in 2005.

In 2016 a second woman, Ophelia Inez Weeks, took on her role of leading the University of Liberia. At her inauguration President Sirleaf lauded the ground breaking job that Brown-Sherman had achieved.

== Personal life ==
Mary Antoinette Grimes married twice, in 1950 and 1973. Her first husband, banker Kedrick Wellington Brown, died in 1962. They had three children. Their daughter Lducia Brown died in a car accident as a child. Her second husband George Flamma Sherman was Liberia's secretary of education, and a former ambassador. She was widowed a second time when Sherman died in 1999, after several years with Alzheimer's disease.

== Death and legacy ==
Dr. Sherman died in 2004. She was buried in Bayview Cemetery, Middletown, New Jersey. A special issue of Liberian Studies Journal, published in 2005, was dedicated to her memory.

The University of Liberia Alumni Association in Pennsylvania named their scholarship program after Sherman after her death, with the first scholarships under the new name being granted to students in 2005. In 2022, the University of Liberia launched a think tank named after Sherman.

In 2014, Liberian President Ellen Johnson Sirleaf commissioned two new boats for the Liberian Coast Guard and named one of them after Sherman.
