= Tuti Faal =

Former first lady of the Gambia

First Lady of the Gambia
- In office 6 November 1996 – 1997
- President: Yahya Jammeh
- Preceded by: Fanta Singhateh
- Succeeded by: Zeinab Jammeh

Personal details
- Born: Kembujeh, The Gambia
- Spouse: Yahya Jammeh (m. 1994; div. 1997)

Tuti Faal, also known as Tuti Faal Jammeh (born c. 1971 in Kembujeh) is a former First Lady of the West African country of Gambia. As the first wife of President Yahya Jammeh, she was the First Lady from 1994 until her divorce in 1998.

== Biography ==
Tuti Faal's family came from Mauritania. Faal worked for Gambian communications company, Gambia Telecommunications Company (GAMTEL).

Yahya Jammeh married Tuti Faal in September 1994, a few months after his successful coup. It was Jammeh's first marriage.

Tuti Faal spoke at the United Nations World Conference on Women in Beijing in 1995 regarding the situation of women in Gambia. In October 1997, she travelled to the United States with her husband on an official trip abroad.

Since she remained childless during their marriage, President Jammeh is said to have sent her to Saudi Arabia in 1997 for gynecological examinations. In December 1997, he married Zeinab Jammeh and divorced Tuti Faal while she was still abroad for medical treatment. After the divorce, Tuti Faal left the presidential State House and settled in her home village of Kembujeh.

She later spent two years in Mauritania before returning to Gambia in early 2006. The Gambian press reported that Jammeh had a house built for her and visited her there regularly. There were also rumors of a new marriage to Jammeh.

In 2015, she applied for political asylum in the United States and moved to Seattle, Washington.
