= GSIC =

GSIC may refer to:

- Gambia Supreme Islamic Council, an Islamic organization based in the Gambia
- GSI Commerce, Inc., former name of a former company based in the United States
