= Mary Masanja =

Tanzanian politician

Honorable Mary Masanja MP

Deputy minister for Natural Resources and Tourism
- Incumbent
- Assumed office December 2021
- President: John Magufuli; Samia Suluhu
- Preceded by: Constantine Kanyasu

Member of Parliament
- Incumbent
- Assumed office November 2020
- Preceded by: Special Seats
- Succeeded by: Special Seats
- Constituency: Women Rep

Personal details
- Born: Mary Francis Masanja; 18 February 1975 (age 51) Mwanza Region
- Party: Chama Cha Mapinduzi
- Education: Nyamagana Primary School; Lake Secondary School; Kagunguli Secondary School
- Alma mater: Nyegezi Social Training Institute; Mzumbe University; The National Board of Accountants Auditors (NBAA)
- Occupation: Civil Servant
- Profession: Accountant

Mary Francis Masanja is a Tanzanian politician and Deputy minister for Natural Resources and Tourism and currently serving as the Chama Cha Mapinduzi's member of parliament for women representatives in special seats since November 2020.
