= Fatoumatta Bah-Barrow =

First Lady of the Gambia

First Lady of the Gambia
- Incumbent
- Assumed office January 19, 2017
- President: Adama Barrow
- Preceded by: Zeinab Jammeh

Personal details
- Born: Fatoumatta Bah; August 5, 1974 (age 50); Banjul, The Gambia
- Spouse: Adama Barrow (m. 1997)
- Children: Two

Fatoumatta Bah-Barrow, also spelled Fatoumata, (born August 5, 1974) is the first wife of the Gambian President Adama Barrow and the First Lady of the Gambia since 2017. She is a member of the Fula ethnic group.

== Education and profession ==
Fatoumatta Bah-Barrow is the daughter of businessman Abdoulie Bah and Isatou Jallow. She is a member of the Fula Ethnic group. She spent her childhood in Basse with her two siblings, attending St. George's School. After completing her education, she moved to the capital, Banjul, where she met Adama Barrow. The couple married on March 20, 1997, when Fatoumatta was 22 years old. Together they have a son, Mamadou Barrow, and a daughter, Taibou Barrow. Adama Barrow has been President of The Gambia since January 2017. Barrow also married a second wife, (Sarjo Mballow-Barrow.).

From 2000 to 2001, she worked in the sales and marketing department of the Elton Oil Company and then at the Africell Gambia LTD until 2008. Before Adama Barrow's presidency, Fatoumatta was involved in managing a family business while also assisting her husband in his real estate ventures. During the 2016 presidential election, she actively supported his campaign, conducting door-to-door outreach to promote his bid for office.

== First Lady ==
Bah-Barrow supported her husband's election campaign in the run-up to the 2016 Gambian presidential election. Similar to his predecessor, Yahya Jammeh, the new President Adama Barrow stipulated that only his first wife, Fatoumatta Bah-Barrow, should assume the role of First Lady of the Gambia.

== The FaBB Foundation ==
In her role as First Lady, she supports charities and aid organizations. She founded the Fatoumatta Bah-Barrow Foundation (FaBB) on May 1, 2017, with the goals of combatting poverty and supporting the sick, women and children. In February 2018, the foundation entered into a partnership with the medical group Merck KGaA to combat infertility in women.

== 33-Million Dalasi Controversy ==
The 33-million-dalasi controversy revolves around allegations against the, Fatoumatta Bah-Barrow Foundation (FABB). In August 2018, it was reported that on December 18, 2017, a sum of 752,000 US dollars (33 million Gambian dalasi) had been transferred from a Hong Kong account to a bank account belonging to the Fatoumatta Bah-Barrow Foundation. According to media reports, $746,000 of that sum was transferred to White Airways, a Portuguese charter airline, to charter a flight to China. The questions arose about the payment's connection with President Barrow's trip to China on December 19, 2017. The Chinese electrical manufacturing company TBEA, which transferred the sum, was about to conclude a contract with the Gambian state-owned National Water and Electricity Company (NAWEC) for the construction of electricity transmission networks at the time. The board of the foundation announced an investigation of the payments.

In September 2019, the foundation called on the government to publicly disclose the transfer and clear Bah-Barrow's reputation. According to The Standard newspaper, the money was intended as financial support for the official trip of the president to China. It was transferred to the foundation account, since direct access to the funds was possible at the time. If the money had been transferred to a government account at the Central Bank of The Gambia rather than the foundation, the government would not have been unable to access it until three business days later, while the president was already traveling at the time.
