= Fatoumatta Njai =

Gambian politician

- Born: 1950 (age 75–76); Banjul
- Education: University of Kent, University of Edinburgh
- Occupation: politician
- Known for: a woman elected in The Gambia
- Political party: People's Progressive Party => Independent
- Children: 3

Fatoumatta Njai (born 1950) is a Gambian politician. She has served in the ECOWAS parliament. She is a pan-Africanist and a women’s leadership advocate.

== Life ==
Njai was born in Banjul in 1950. She took her first degree in politics at the University of Kent at Canterbury. She then studied law in London. She has taken an MBA at the University of Edinburgh.

In February 2017, she announced her intention to enter politics. In the 2017 parliamentary elections, Njai ran as a candidate for the People's Progressive Party (PPP) in the Banjul South constituency and won, defeating four opposing candidates, with an absolute majority. During her term in office, PPP members, including the later party leader Kebba Jallow, announced her expulsion from the party, but she rejected this. She became a member of Gambia's parliament and she has chaired the Gender Committee.

In the 2022 parliamentary elections, Njai again won the most votes in the constituency as an independent and became a member of the 6th Gambian National Assembly. She was one of three women in the parliament. She is known as a Women’s Leadership Advocate. Njai is a pan-Africanist and she went on to be a member of Economic Community of West African States (ECOWAS) parliament.

She was one of the 15 women chosen in the second wave of women leaders identified as part of the Amujae initiative by the Ellen Johnson Sirleaf Presidential Center for Women and Development. She was the second Gambian woman as Oley Dibba-Wadda had been chosen in the inaugural year of the initiative.

In 2022, she put forward a proposal to increase the number of parliamentarians in the National Assembly. The objective was to increase the number of women involved in politics.

== Results ==
Banjul South Constituency
| Election | Votes | Percent |
|---|---|---|
| 2017 | 1.411 | 58,52 % |
| 2022 | 1.538 | 39,77 % |
