= Upendo Peneza =

- Born: 26 June 1989
- Education: Open University of Tanzania
- Occupation: politician
- Known for: young member of parliament in 2015
- Political party: Chadema => Chama Cha Mapinduzi (CCM)

Upendo Furaha Peneza (born June 26, 1989) is a Tanzanian politician. She became a parliamentarian in 2015. She has chaired the Tanzania Youth Parliamentarians Forum.

== Life ==
Peneza was born in about 1989.

She came to the public's notice when she appeared on a TV programme. The program was called Maisha Plus and she competed with others demonstrating life skills. She was third.

She became a member of Tanzania's eleventh parliament in 2015 and served until 2020 representing the Chadema party.

She then served as treasurer for her party in Victoria.

Peneza was chosen by the Ellen Johnson Sirleaf Presidential Center for Women and Development for their inaugural fifteen women to receive their fellowship.

She chaired the Tanzania Youth Parliamentarians Forum.

In January 2024 she changed political parties to join the ruling party Chama Cha Mapinduzi (CCM). CCM Secretary General, Ambassador Emmanuel Nchimbi announced her new allegiance in Dodoma.

She was a candidate for election in 2025. Her previous party has been declared illegal after it called for electoral reform. Doubts have been raised about the state of democracy in the country. In August 2025 she was competing in the primaries with MP Constantine Kanyasu for the Geita Urban seat.

Peneza has defended the abilities of women in politics including the country's president. She notes that she has to frequently remind her audiences that she is a woman and a leader.
