= Fanta Singhateh =

First Lady of the Gambia from 1966 to 1970 (1929–2023)

Fanta, Lady Singhateh, CRG

First Lady of the Gambia
- In office February 9, 1966 – April 24, 1970
- Governor General: Sir Farimang Singhateh
- Preceded by: Kathleen Paul
- Succeeded by: Chilel Jawara

Personal details
- Born: 13 July 1929 Georgetown (present-day Janjanbureh), British Gambia
- Died: 12 May 2023 (aged 93)
- Spouse: Sir Farimang Singhateh (m. 1949; died 1977)
- Awards: Commander of the Order of the Republic of the Gambia (CRG)

Fanta, Lady Singhateh, CRG (13 July 1929 – 12 May 2023), also known as Fatou Fanta Basse Sagnia, or Sagniang was First Lady of the Gambia from 1966 to 1970.

== Biography ==
Singahteh was born in Georgetown, modern Janjanbureh, The Gambia, on 13 July 1929. In 1949, she married Sir Farimang Singhateh, then medical officer, but future Governor-General of the Gambia. They had six children together. She and her husband, who were both Ahmadiyya, went on the Hajj - the pilgrimage to Mecca in 1964.

== Politics ==
Singhateh and her husband were early members of the People's Progressive Party, which was founded in 1959. As part of their work within the party, they campaigned for the end of colonialism.

Singhateh herself was known as a radical within the party. Prior to her marriage, Singhateh was an activist and was one of the first people to receive charitable shipments of second-hand clothing from Belgium to distribute in regions like Bakoteh, Sukuta and rural villages.

Singhateh served as First Lady of the Gambia from 1966 to 1970, when her husband was the Governor-General of the Gambia. They were both the first Gambians to be in those posts, he as Governor-General, she as First Lady. In her role, she was concerned with welfare and encouraged philanthropic schemes aimed at supporting women. She was a strong advocate of communal, cultural and social development.

In her 90s, she opened a bakery providing low-cost products, enabling everyone to buy bread. She died on 12 May 2023, at the age of 93.

== Awards ==
In 2012, Singhateh became a Commander of the Order of the Republic of the Gambia (CRG).

When her husband was awarded a knighthood by Queen Elizabeth II, Singhateh could adopt the title Lady, and became known to many in the Gambia as 'Lady Fanta'.
