= Ophelia Inez Weeks =

Liberian academic

- Employer: University of Liberia
- Known for: President of the University of Liberia

Ophelia Inez Weeks is a Liberian academic. She led the University of Liberia from 2017 to 2019. Subsequently, she served as Liberian Executive Director and Board Secretary for the Ellen Johnson Sirleaf Presidential Center for Women and Development.

== Life ==
Weeks' father was Rocheforte Weeks, the first Liberian President of the University of Liberia from 1959 to 1972.

In 2017, Weeks became the 14th President of the University of Liberia. She was the second woman to be president and the first to be a child of a former head of the university. She inherited a body that less than a decade before had a terrible reputation for admitting students with little qualification and then allowing them and other to gain qualifications they had not achieved. The retiring head of the university was credited with turning it around and the university's budget had increased by a magnitude.

At the start of 2018 there was a protest by the students of her decision to not extend a registration deadline. The protest lasted for seven hours and included about 200 students.

She led the university for a short time, being replaced as president in 2019 at the instruction of Liberian president George Weah who had come to power the year before. The new university president was Dean Nelson.

The Ellen Johnson Sirleaf Presidential Center for Women and Development was created in 2018. Ellen Johnson Sirleaf had led Liberia from 2006 to 2018 as the first woman to lead an African country. Weeks led this centre from March 2020 with its flagship programme to create a generation of African women leaders.

Weeks was thanked for her work at the EJSPC by Ellen Johnson Sirleaf when Gambian Oley Dibba-Wadda took over as an interim replacement in 2022.
