= Yakama Manty Jones =

Sierra Leonean economist

- Citizenship: Sierra Leone

Academic background
- Education: Fourah Bay College (BEc); Birkbeck College (PhD) University of Manchester; Queen Mary and Westfield College; Harvard Kennedy School
- Awards: Amujae Leader
- Website: www.yakamajones.com

Yakama Manty Jones (née Mara) is a Sierra Leonean economist, entrepreneur and philanthropist with a Ph.D. in finance and economics. She is the Director of Research and Delivery at the Sierra Leone Ministry of Finance and a Focal Person for the World Bank's Human Capital Project in Sierra Leone. In 2021, she was selected to be an Amujae leader by the EJS Center. Jones has authored and co-authored multiple scholarly articles, and has spoken at TEDxYouth, Africa Oxford Initiative, and the World Bank.

== Early life and education ==
Yakama Manty Jones was born in Sierra Leone. She attended the Tower Hill Kindergarten and Primary School, where she sat to the National Primary School Examinations (NPSE). Jones enrolled at Limount College, where she sat for the London G.C.E O’ Level Examinations, and emerged the best candidate in the country. She then attended Fourah Bay College, University of Sierra Leone, where she earned her bachelor's degree with Honours in Economics.

Jones went on to earn a Master of Science in Finance and Economics from the University of London, and a Master of Research in International Business & Development from the University of Manchester. She then earned her Phd in Finance and Economics at the University of London. Her PhD dissertation focused on Debt Overhang and the ‘Resource Curse Hypothesis. Jones completed a Certificate in Social Entrepreneurship from the University of Oxford and an Executive Certificate in Economic Development from Harvard Kennedy School.

== Career ==
Jones has held several consulting roles. She served as a Data Management Specialist on the Former President Ernest Bai Koroma's Post- Ebola Recovery Delivery Team, the President's Recovery Priorities. She was promoted to Information Management and Quality Assurance Specialist and eventually Delivery Team Lead, succeeding Her Worship Yvonne Aki-Sawyerr, who became the mayor of Freetown.

Jones serves as Director of Research and Delivery at the Ministry of Finance in Sierra Leone. She is also an Associate Lecturer in the Department of Economics and Commerce at Fourah Bay College, University of Sierra Leone. Additionally, she is the Team Lead for the Economic Policy pathway on the University of Sierra Leone's Master of Research and Public Policy (MRPP) collaborative Masters program with the Partnership of African Social and Governance Research (PASGR).

Jones is also an entrepreneur and co-founded the Peninsular Innovative Group (PI Group) with her husband, Herbert Jones. The PI Group operates across the shipping, manufacturing, and agri-business industries in Sierra Leone. Jones founded the Yak Jones Foundation, promoting reading and child literacy by donating books to needy schools, organising reading comprehension and quiz competitions, and establishing book clubs. The Foundation has worked with Project Pikin's Safe Space Library to provide reading materials for Freetown's street children and the Rotary Club Sunset of Freetown to establish a school library.

Jones is a Senior Research Fellow at the Centre for Alternative Policy Research and Innovation and a certified mentor on Mentor-X Africa She also currently serves on the boards of the Children's Education Foundation, Asmaa James Foundation, Girls Plus and several schools. Jones has given lectures locally and internationally with organizations such as the United Nations Population Fund (UNFPA), the Blavatnik School of Government, University of Oxford, the Tony Blair Institute for Global Change, and the World Bank. She speaks on issues such as education, entrepreneurship, human capital development, and service delivery. Jones was a 2017 Sierra Leone Open Government Fellow in the Open Data Fellowship Programme.

== Awards and Honours ==
Jones was named one of 50 Most Influential Young Sierra Leoneans, one of the 50 Most Influential Women in Sierra Leone, one of the 100 Most Influential Young Sierra Leoneans, recognized for excellence and integrity by Youth in Governance-SL and featuring on the 100 Women in West Africa list.

== Personal life ==
Jones is married to Herbert Durosimi Jones. Together they have two daughters, Hedya-Gold and Hedsania-Silver Jones.

== Research interests ==
Jones' research interests include: Development Economics, International Business, Human Capital Development, Macro and Micro-level data analysis for growth dynamics, Building data systems and innovative growth metrics, Innovation and Systems Approaches to Public Service Delivery and Human-Centered Design.
