= Zeinab Jammeh =

Former First Lady of The Gambia

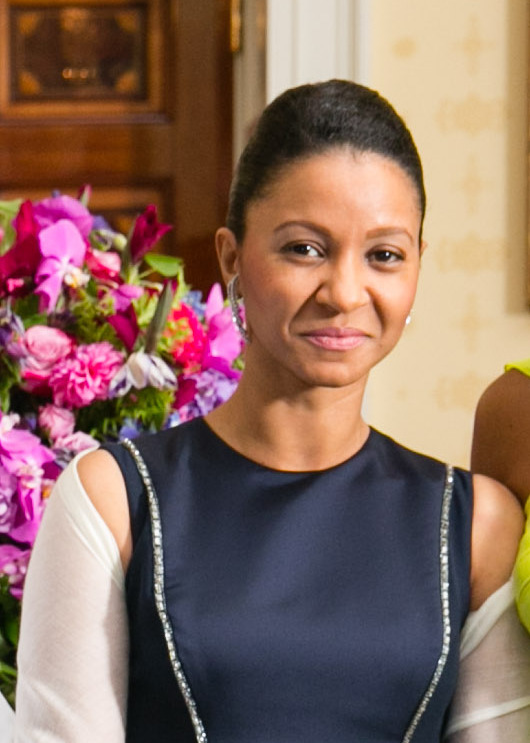

First Lady of the Gambia
- In role 1999 – 21 January 2017
- President: Yahya Jammeh
- Preceded by: Tuti Faal
- Succeeded by: Fatoumatta Bah-Barrow

Personal details
- Born: Zeinab Suma; October 5, 1977 (age 48) Rabat, Morocco
- Party: Alliance for Patriotic Reorientation and Construction
- Spouse: Yahya Jammeh (m. 1999)
- Children: 2
- Education: American International University West Africa

Zainab Suma Jammeh (born October 5, 1977) is the former First Lady of the Gambia and the main wife of Yahya Jammeh, the former President of the Gambia. Zainab has two children, a daughter and a son, with Yahya Jammeh. In September 2019, the results of the Janneh Commission, a committee of inquiry set up by the Barrow government to investigate Jammeh's financial activities, were published. The report indicated that she has appropriated public funds from the Gambia amounting to 3.3 million Dalasi and 2 million US dollars through her foundation.

== Early life ==
Zeinab Suma (or Soumah) was born to Alhaji Ibrahima and Rhimou El Hassady Soumah in Morocco.
