= Malado Kaba =

Guinean politician and economist

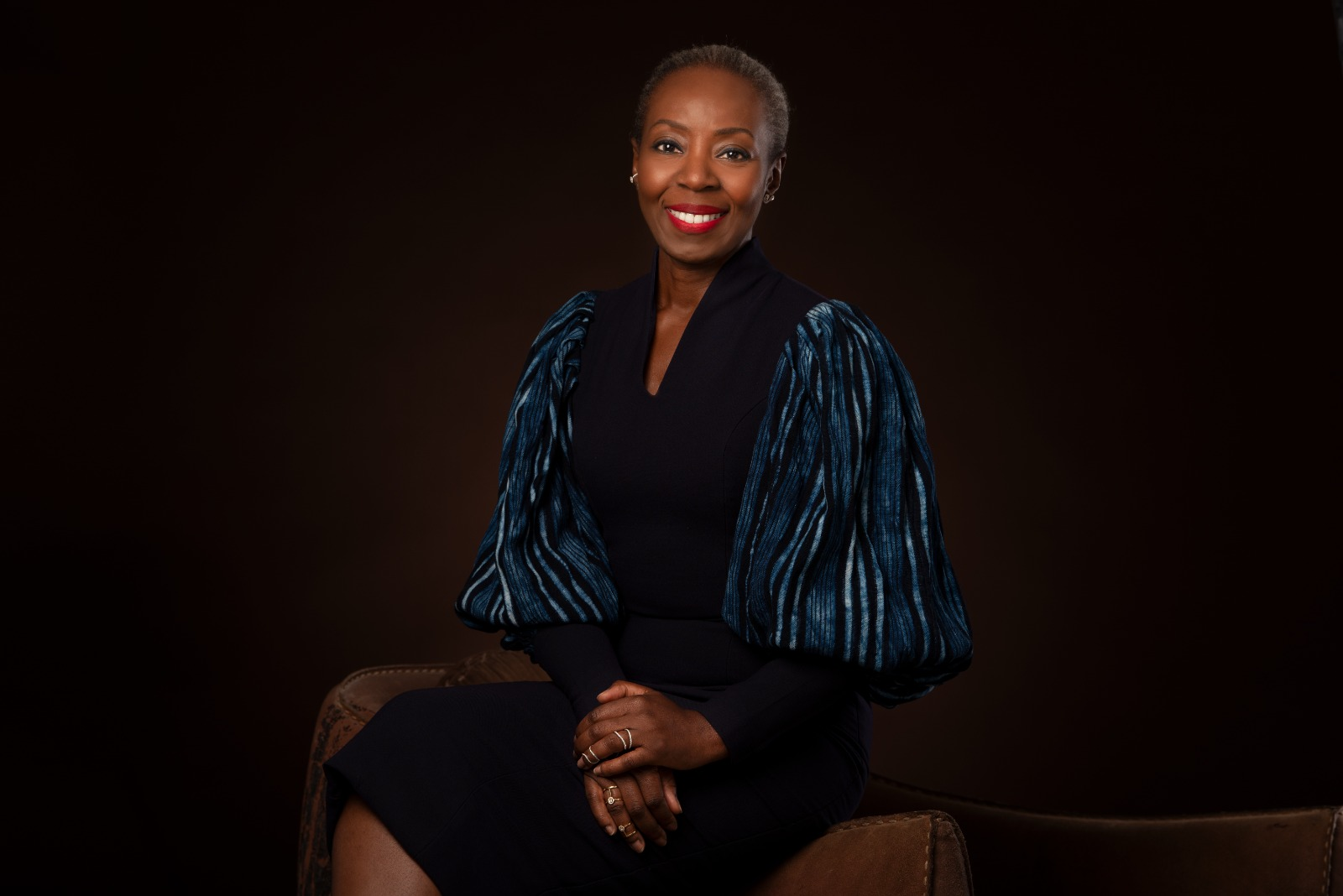

Malado Kaba (born 22 March 1971) is a Guinean economist and the first female Minister of Economy and Finance of Guinea. She served from January 2016 until May 2018.

== Early life and education ==
Malado Kaba was born on 22 March 1971 in Monrovia, Liberia. She and her parents moved to France when she was 3 months old.

She spent her childhood and teenage years between Paris and the suburbs. Kaba attended the Lycée Honoré de Balzac in Paris where she obtained her baccalauréat in 1989. She graduated from Paris Nanterre University in 1994 with a degree in development economics and a degree in international economics in 1994. She also holds a certificate from the Goethe Institute as a proficient user of the German language.

== Career ==
Kaba did an internship at the French Ministry of Foreign Affairs before working as an adviser at the Guinean Ministry of Economy and Finance from 1996 until 1999. She has worked on several development projects with the European Union and oversaw analysis of the European Commission's partnership with South Africa related to macroeconomics and budgetary transparency.

In 2014, Kaba became country-head of the Africa Governance Initiative of former British Prime Minister Tony Blair.

Kaba was appointed Minister of Finance by President Alpha Condé on 6 January 2016, the first woman in the role and one of seven women appointed to cabinet.

In 2020, Malado Kaba was nominated to join the "inaugural class of Amujae Leaders, class of 2020" of the Ellen Johnson Sirleaf Presidential Center for Women and Development, set up by President Ellen Johnson Sirleaf. The vision for the Amujae Initiative is to shift the landscape for women in public leadership in Africa.

In May 2022, Malado Kaba was appointed Director of the Gender, Women and Civil Society Department of the African Development Bank (AfDB). The appointment to her position takes effect from June 16, 2022.
