= Constantine Kanyasu =

Tanzanian politician

Honourable Constantine John Kanyasu MP

Member of Parliament for Geita Mjini
- Incumbent
- Assumed office December 2015

Personal details
- Born: 17 October 1969 (age 56)
- Party: Chama Cha Mapinduzi
- Education: Open University of Tanzania

Constantine John Kanyasu (born October 17, 1969) is a Tanzanian politician and a member of the Chama Cha Mapinduzi political party. He was elected MP representing Geita in 2015. On November 10, 2018, he was appointed by President John Magufuli and on November 13, 2018, he was sworn in as Deputy Prime Minister for Natural Resources and Tourism.

He has graduated with Bachelors of Commerce at the Open University of Tanzania in 2005.

In August 2025 he was competing in the primaries with former Chadema MP Upendo Peneza for the Geita Urban seat.
