= Religion in the Gambia =

Religion in the Gambia (Pew Research Center 2020)
1. Islam (97.0%)
2. Christianity (2.90%)
3. Other (0.10%)

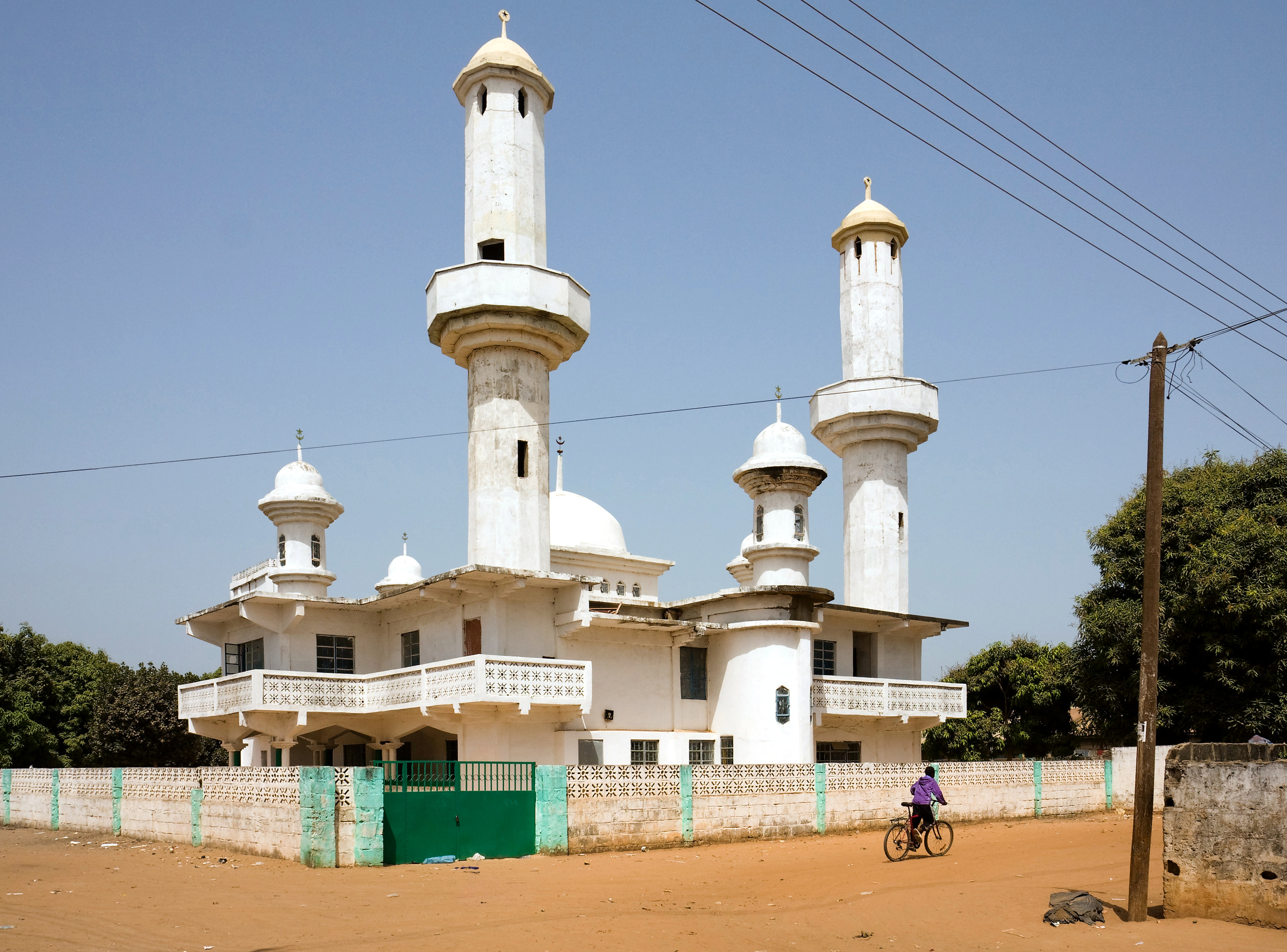
Mosque in Faji Kunda, Gambia

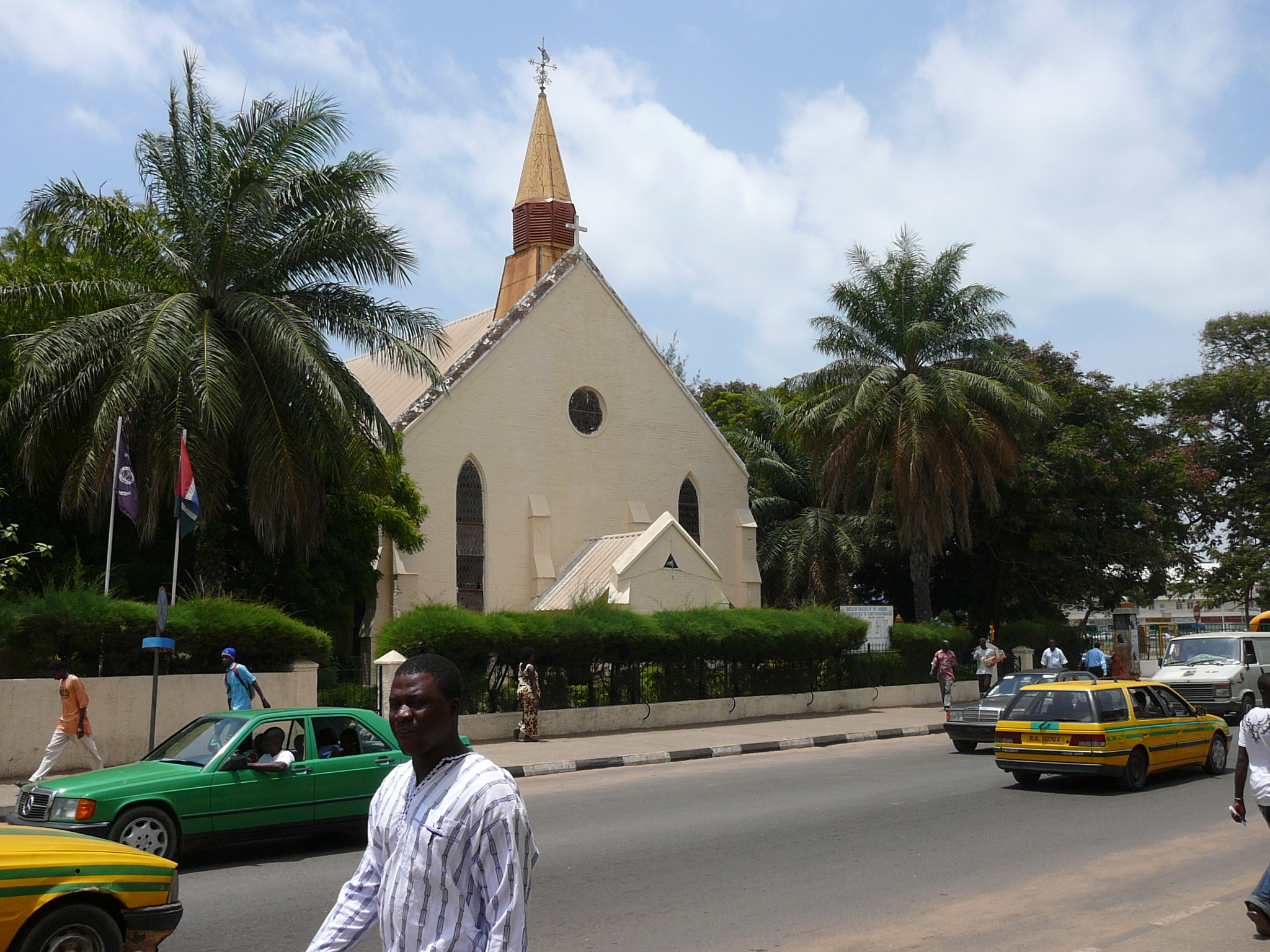
Saint Mary's Anglican Cathedral in Banjul

The Gambia is a Muslim majority country, with Muslims constituting 97% of the population, some 2.9% are Christian, and 0.1% practice other religions (including African Traditional Religions).

== Legal regulations ==
Articles 17, 25, 32, 33, and 212 of the Constitution guarantee and protects the freedom of religion.

Article 60 of the constitution prohibits forming political parties that are formed on a religious basis.

Government meetings and events typically commence with two prayers, one Islamic and one Christian. The government often invites senior officials of both religious groups to open major government events with prayers.

The government does not require religious groups to register. Faith-based nongovernmental organizations (NGOs) must meet the same registration and licensing requirements as other NGOs.

=== Freedom of religion ===
In the Senegambia region, the Serer people have faced ethnic and religious persecution for almost a millennia for practicing Serer spirituality (A ƭat Roog). The persecution of Serers dates back to the 11th century. In recent years, they are the object of scorn and prejudice. The Tanzanian historian and author, Godfrey Mwakikagile, in his book Ethnic Diversity and Integration in The Gambia: The Land, The People and The Culture (2010), writes:

"Today, the Serer retain much of their old culture, customs and traditions. In fact, it's not uncommon to hear how Serer culture has survived through the centuries in spite of all the forces which tried to destroy it."

Despite resisting Islamization for several centuries, most of the Serers had converted to Islam by the 20th century in a process that is ongoing. Some still follow ultra-orthodox Serer spirituality (A ƭat Roog) or the Christian faith. In the Serer religious and agricultural calendar, the day of worship and libations to the Serer pangool (ancestral spirits), and prohibition of all cultural activities corresponds to Thursdays in the Gregorian calendar, and the day of rest is on Mondays. Since independence, none of the consecutive Senegalese or Gambian governments have made allowances for citizens who practice Traditional African religions like the Serer religion to practice their faith on Mondays and Thursdays.

In 2023 the country was scored 2 out of 4 for religious freedom; it was noted that non-Sunni Muslim groups experience discrimination.

== Islam ==
According to the CIA World Factbook, Muslims constitute 96.4 percent of the population. The vast majority are Sunnis influenced by Sufism. The main Sufi orders represented are Tijaniyah and Qadiriyah. Sufi orders pray together at common mosques. A small percentage of Muslims, predominantly immigrants from South Asia, do not ascribe to any traditional Islamic school of thought.

=== Islam and state ===
The Supreme Islamic Council is an independent body that advises the government on religious issues. Although not represented on the council, the government provides the council with substantial funding. The country's president serves as the minister of religious affairs and maintains a formal relationship with the council.

The constitution establishes Qadi courts, with Muslim judges trained in the Islamic legal tradition, in specific areas that the chief justice determines. The Qadi courts are located in each of the country's seven regions and apply sharia law. Their jurisdiction applies only to marriage, divorce, custody over children, and inheritance questions for Muslims.

Non-Qadi district tribunals, which deal with issues under the customary and traditional law, apply sharia, if relevant when presiding over cases involving Muslims. A five-member Qadi panel has purview over appeals regarding decisions of the Qadi courts and non-Qadi district tribunals relating to sharia.

=== Ahmadiyya ===
Among the immigrants from South Asia there are also followers of the Ahmadiyya Muslim sect. In 2022, there was an estimated 50,000 Ahmadiyyas Muslims in the country.

== Christianity ==
A significant minority, estimated 3.5% of the population, is Christian. The Christian community, situated mostly in the west and south of the country, is predominantly Roman Catholic. In 2007 there were also several Protestant groups including Anglicans, Methodists, Baptists, Seventh-day Adventists, and various small evangelical denominations.

== Traditional African religions and syncretism ==
Less than 1% practice traditional African religion. In some areas, Islam and Christianity are syncretized with traditional African religions, such as the Serer religion. The dwindling number of followers of Traditional African religions is in part, due to the persecution of traditional African religions in many parts of Africa–such as the persecution of Serers for following their religion, culture and way of life.

== Hinduism ==
In 2022 there was a small group of Hindus among the South Asian community.

According to ARDA, Gambia had 0.02% Hindus in 2020.

== Regulation of interfaith marriage ==
Intermarriage between Muslims and Christians is common.

The Serer people who are an ethnoreligious group and nation, and one of the oldest inhabitants of the Senegambia region forbids interfaith, interethnic and interracial marriages, and often marry amongst themselves for Serer religious and cultural reasons―especially those who practice Serer spirituality (A ƭat Roog). There are also Serers who marry into the other Senegambian ethnic groups and faiths, but most often, they are not practicing Serers or have converted to the Abrahamic religions. In Serer tradition, banishment and disinheritance are some of the possible punishments for marrying out. The Serer-Noon (a subgroup within the Serer ethnic group) in particular, adhere strongly to these teachings.

== Other beliefs ==
There is a small number of followers of the Eckankar and Baháʼí Faiths in the country.

== Religion and ethnicity ==
Religion by ethnicity in The Gambia
Ethnicity	Islam	Christianity	Animism
Mandinka	99.8%	0.2%	0.02%
Fulani	99.7%	0.3%	0.01%
Wolof	99.7%	0.3%	0.01%
Jola	91.6%	8.4%	0.06%
Soninke	99.9%	0.1%	0%
Serer	97.3%	2.7%	0%
Manjago	20.8%	78.9%	0.22%
Bambara	99.2%	0.8%	0%
Aku	19.9%	80.1%	0.1%
Other Gambian	75.7%	24.2%	0.1%
Total Gambians:	96.6%	3.4%	0.02%
Francophone West African Migrants:	96%	3.9%	0.02%
Anglophone West African Migrants:	38.5%	61.1%	0.07%
Bissau-Guinean Migrants:	55.5%	43.5%	0.65%
Other African Migrants:	72.6%	25.7%	0.5%
Non-African Migrants:	28.8%	55.9%	0.44%
Total Population of The Gambia:	95.4%	4.3%	0.03%

== Faith practices outside codified Islam ==
=== Female genital mutilation ===
Female genital mutilation (FGM) is a practice that is prevalent in many African countries and has sparked various debates around religion and tradition/culture. FGM as a rite of passage is practiced heavily in the Gambia; about 75% of the population indulges in it, mainly affecting young girls before they reach 18. It is the ritual cutting or removal of some or all of the external female genitalia. This is a pre-Islamic practice, but many use the Qu'ran to justify it, stating that Allah has vindicated it. Nevertheless, out of the eight ethnic groups, seven engage in the practice. It is a practice that is believed to ensure premarital virginity and marital fidelity. The World Health Organization (WHO) has recognized it as a violation of the human rights of young girls and women. In 2015 former President Jammeh banned FGM, ordering anyone who was caught performing would be sentenced to jail; however, there is no law stating that it has been officially banned.

In Serer religion and culture, only Serer boys undergo circumcision through the Ndut initiation rite. Serer females go through their own initiation rite called the ndom or njam in Serer ― which is the tattooing of the gums, but FGM is forbidden in Serer religion and culture.

=== Animism ===
Although Islam is a monotheistic religion, many ethnic tribes in the Gambia are practitioners of animism and have faith in other gods. The practice of wearing Jujus around the waist is a common feature among ethnic groups. Jujus are charms that are believed to have magical or supernatural powers. Many wear them as protection or good luck charms against any evil. Gambian wrestlers, soccer players, artists, and people in various professions are known for wearing Juju waistbands. The Juju waistbands are mostly Qur'anic inscriptions prescribed by Marabouts enclosed in leather pouches; in the Mandinka language, they are called Safou. Marabouts can be Islamic teachers, fortune tellers, shamans, or spiritual guides. People seek advice from them to obtain any form of good fortune and luck. The local herbalists/marabout make these Juju waistbands to protect people from evil and improve their status.

The Serer religion, Serer cosmogony, and the Serer pangool (ancestral spirits) have been influential in the Senegambia region i.e., the borrowing and adopting of ancient Serer religious festivals into Islamic practices, language, and culture. On the subject of Serer spirituality's influence, the late Senegalese president and poet, Léopold Sédar Senghor writes:

"As today a Moslem Head of state will consult the "sacred wood", and offer in sacrifice an ox or a bull, I have seen a Christian woman, a practicing medical doctor, consult the sereer "Pangol" [the snakes of the sacred wood]. In truth, everywhere in Black Africa, the "revealed religions" are rooted in the animism which still inspires poets and artists, I am well placed to know it and to say it [...]"

=== Praying at sacred sites ===
Many Gambians will pray at sacred sites where holy men frequently pray to seek Allah's blessing. Places such as crocodile pools, ancient trees, and burial sites are familiar places where Gambia Muslims seek prayer answers despite it being against the Islamic Code. The most common sacred sites are in Bakau Kachikally (the Kachikally Museum and Crocodile Pool), and Kartong Folonko. People frequently visit these sites for various reasons, such as seeking blessing for a promotion at work and praying for their children. Women who cannot have children often visit these sites to seek Allah's blessing in the hopes they will conceive. Some of the Serer sacred sites in the Gambia include the Senegambian stone circles. The Serers do not pray to these stones, but make offerings or libations there in remembrance of their ancestors. Some scholars belief that the Serers were the builders as they are the sole ethnic group in the region who still use funerary houses like those found at Wanar site. For the religious symbolism behind the groupings of the stones, see Serer creation myth and mummification and cult of the upright stones in Serer religion.

=== Death-related superstitions (late-night calls) ===
Late-night calls are the calling of someone's name at night. Many communities believe that calling a person's name at night comes from owls announcing the community's pending death. Owls in many ethnic tribes are seen as evil; thus, tribe elders advise members never to answer late-night calls.

== See also ==
- Demographics of Gambia
- Islam in Gambia
- Christianity in Gambia
- Serer religion
- Serer creation myth
- Religion in Senegal
