= Angèle Makombo =

Congolese politician

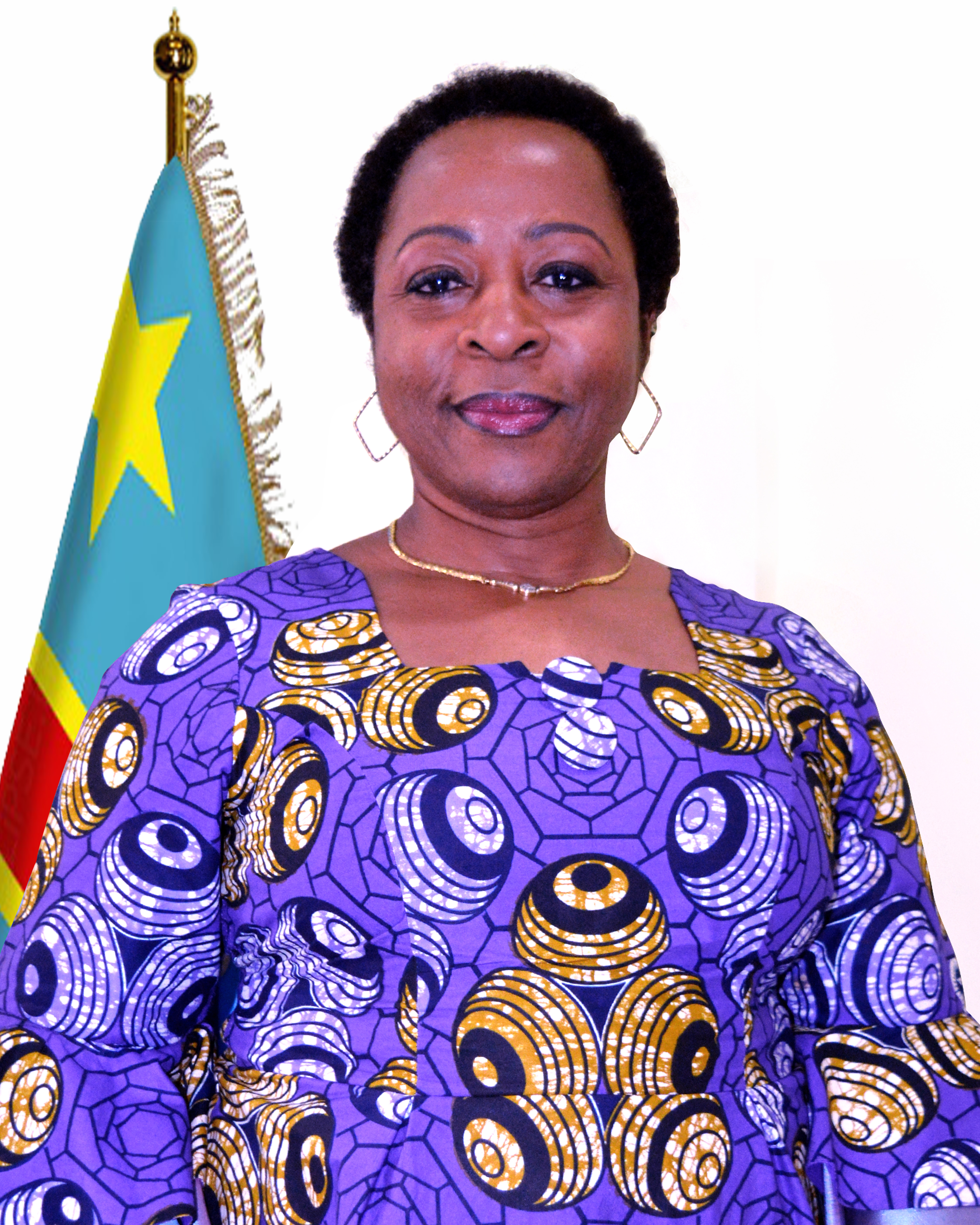
Angèle Makombo

Angèle Makombo-Eboum is a Congolese (Democratic Republic of the Congo) politician. She is the president of the Ligue des Démocrates Congolais ('League of Congolese Democrats').

She graduated from University of Paris 1 Panthéon-Sorbonne and Sciences Po, and she worked at the United Nations.

== Works ==
- Yusuf, A. A. (30 July 1998). "Civil Conflicts in the Great Lakes Region". African Yearbook of International Law, 1997. Martinus Nijhoff Publishers. ISBN 978-90-411-1055-8.
