= Yawa, Central African Republic =

Yawa
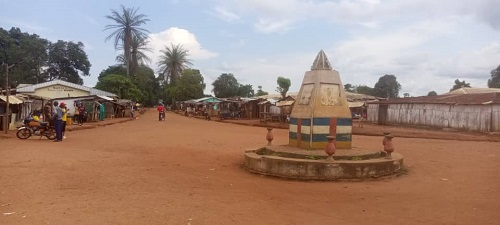
- Yawa Central

- Location in Central African Republic
- Coordinates: 4°20′47″N 17°5′41″E
- Country: Central African Republic
- Prefecture: Lobaye
- Sub-prefecture: Boganda
- Commune: Boganda

Yawa is a village situated in Lobaye Prefecture, Central African Republic.

== Attacks ==
On 21 August 2023, soldiers launched a protest by shooting into the air. The shooting caused panic among the locals, and many of them fled to the bush.

An unknown armed group attacked the FACA base in Yawa on 25 August 2023, and soldiers repelled the attack. The next day, the same militia assaulted FACA soldiers in the village. Due to the attack, the village was deserted, and many of its residents fled to Boganda.

== Healthcare ==
Yawa had one health post.
