= Oley Dibba-Wadda =

Gambian activist

- Born: 24 March 1967 (age 59); Oxford, England
- Education: University of East Anglia
- Political party: United Democratic Party
- Spouse: Bye Malleh Wadda
- Relatives: Lucretia St. Clair Joof (great grandmother)
- Website: oleydibbawadda.com

Oley Lucretia Clara Dibba-Wadda (born 24 March 1967, Oxford, United Kingdom) is a Gambian social development executive, policy strategist and gender equality advocate. She is recognized for her leadership in education reform, women's empowerment, and youth development across Africa. With over 25 years of experience, she has held senior leadership roles in major continental and international institutions, contributing to policy development, institutional strengthening, and large-scale development initiatives.

She was a 2019 Amujae Initiative fellow.

== Early life and education ==
Dibba-Wadda was born on 24 March 1967 in Oxford, United Kingdom, to Gambian Parents. She pursued higher education in the United Kingdom, obtaining a Master's degree in Gender Analysis in Development from the University of East Anglia, as well as a Diploma in Gender and Development.

== Career ==
=== Early career and international development work ===
Dibba-Wadda began her career in international development, holding roles with organizations including The European Development Fund Support to Decntralised Rural Development in The Gambia, Concern Universal, the Commonwealth Education Fund, and Oxfam Great Britain. Her early work focused on gender policy, education programming, and development strategy globally and across Africa and Asia. She later served as Global Gender Advisor at Oxfam GB and held regional and international roles in education and gender-focused initiatives.

=== Leadership in African institutions ===
Dibba-Wadda held several senior leadership roles in pan-African institutions including: • Executive Director, Forum for African Women Educationalists (FAWE) • Executive Director, Femmes Africa Solidarité (FAS) • Executive Secretary, Association for the Development of Education in Africa (ADEA), where she was the first woman to hold the position

At ADEA, she worked with education ministries from over 50 African countries and international partners to strengthen policy dialogue and education reform.

=== African Development Bank ===
In 2017, Dibba-Wadda was appointed Director of Human Capital, Youth and Skills Development at the African Development Bank. In this role, she led initiatives focused on human capital development, overseeing 5 sectors: education and skills, youth employment, Banking on Nutirtion, Public Health Security, Social Protection across the continent.

=== Later leadership and advisory roles ===
Dibba-Wadda is the Founder and President of The Gam Africa Institute for Leadership (GAIL) and she has held several leadership and advisory roles, including: • Executive Director, Ellen Johnson Sirleaf Presidential Center for Women and Development • Board Member, Women Political Leaders network • Board Member Teach for All Africa Advisory Council • Board Member Forum for African Women Educationalists • Member of the 100 global Women Leaders supporting UN Women’s work on Women Leadership • Member, inaugural cohort of the Amujae Initiative

She has also served on several other multiple boards and advisory platforms related to gender equality, education, youth and women leadership, and development in Africa.

=== Coaching, mentoring and public engagement ===
A certified life coach, Dibba-Wadda mentors and coaches young people, particularly women, across Africa and beyond in professional leadership and personal development. She is a frequent speaker at international conferences and forums, contributing to discussions on education reform, gender equality, youth empowerment and women’s leadership.

== Advocacy and impact ==
Dibba-Wadda’s work focuses on strengthening education systems, advancing gender equality, women’s leadership and promoting youth development. She has contributed to policy reforms, institutional capacity building, and partnership mobilization across Africa. Her advocacy emphasizes investment in girls’ education, human capital development, and inclusive growth.

== Publications ==
- "Memoirs of an African Woman on a Mission", 2017

== Awards and recognition ==
Dibba-Wadda has received several awards and recognitions for her contributions to development and leadership, including:

- “Inspiring Woman of Excellence”, 2012
- “African Woman Leadership”, 2013
- "New African Woman in Education", 2017 nominee
- “She Awards” for Outstanding Woman Writer, 2020 nominee
- first cohort of 15 African women leaders across Africa for the President Ellen Johnson Sirleaf “Amujae Initiative”

== Personal life ==
Dibba-Wadda was born in Oxford, United Kingdom, to Gambian parents. She is married and has four children.

== Awards ==
- “Inspiring Woman of Excellence”, 2012
- “African Woman Leadership”, 2013
- "New African Woman in Education", 2017 nominee
- “She Awards” for Outstanding Woman Writer, 2020 nominee
- first cohort of 15 African women leaders across Africa for the President Ellen Johnson Sirleaf “Amujae Initiative”
