= Yawa Hansen-Quao =

Ghanaian social entrepreneur and feminist

- Born: Accra, Ghana
- Education: Kofi Annan International Peacekeeping Training Centre; American University of Rome; Ghana Institute of Journalism
- Occupations: Director, entrepreneur
- Known for: Founder and Director of Leading Ladies Network

Yawa Hansen-Quao (born in Accra) is a Ghanaian founder, social entrepreneur and a feminist. She sits on the Board of Directors of Ashesi University, serves on the advisory board, Women's Institute for Global Leadership and Benedictine University. She is the founder of the Leading Ladies Network (LLN), a member of the African Leadership Network and the World Economic Forum's Global Shapers Community. She is a force to reckon with in the education and well-being of the girl child.

== Early life ==
Yawa Hansen-Quao is the oldest daughter of a Ghanaian politician who was forced to flee the country in the early 1980s amidst the season of political turmoil. She lived her early life as a refugee in Togo and then in the United States. Like many African refugees forced to flee their continent, she was raised between two cultures and internalized both. It was not an easy time for Yawa, living under the trust that they would return home when it was much safer, yet this bi-cultural childhood moulded who she is today. She returned home at last in 1996 as an adolescent. The dialect and cultural barriers prevented her associations with other African-brought up youngsters. The restricted advancement opportunities accessible for African young ladies rapidly became evident to Yawa.

After her guardians isolation, the family fell on troublesome budgetary times but she needed to bolster the family and care for her father, who was sick with cancer.

Despite these hardships she had a supportive network in her father, a best friend and her mentor from the US Junior Achievement programme. This mentor saw so much potential in her that she paid Yawa's school fees during the family's financial crises so that she could remain in school. School was an outlet for Yawa's leadership potential and creative energy. Her maturity and responsibility was rewarded with a number of roles in student government.

== Personal life and education ==
Hansen-Quao joined Ashesi University hoping that it would be a platform where she could become a part of transforming Ghana. By working several jobs, depending on financial aid and friends' generosity, she entered and gave herself to Ashesi. During her time there she started the Ashesi Business Club and Women of Ashesi student groups. She also became an HIV/AIDS peer educator and was eventually elected in 2006 as the first female to become college-level student government president in Ghana.

While in school she decided to tackle an issue plaguing many African universities, corruption in all its forms. At all educational levels in Ghana, cheating, bribery and trading of sex for grades were common and she sought to introduce an honour code to her school. By adopting the honour code, Ashesi, led by Hansen-Quao, set the standard within the wider educational system. She further undertook an MA in Gender, Peace and Security at the Kofi Annan International Peacekeeping Training Centre and an Honours degree in Entrepreneurship and New Product Development at the American University of Rome. She also pursued a Certificate in Radio and TV Presentation at the Ghana Institute of Journalism, and attained a Certified Corporate Etiquette and International Protocol Consultant at the Protocol School of Washington, USA.

== Career ==
When the time came for Hansen-Quao to leave Ashesi, she wanted to create a community that nurtured leaders, similar to her Ashesi experience. Her strong belief in the intrinsic leadership of African women led to her creating the Leading Ladies Network (LLN), a resource and relationship base for young women as they take leadership roles in government, civil society, corporate organizations and others. Through its Female Leadership Advancement, Mentoring and Empowerment Series, LLN trains young women to be instruments of social change, supporting them in all areas and preparing them to be servant leaders in their chosen fields. These women carry out projects to improve their societies and are prepared to take on further leadership roles.

Aside from her regular duties as a founder, Hansen-Quao is a member of the board of directors of the Ashesi University, on the advisory board of Women's Institute for Global Leadership, Benedictine University, a member of the African Leadership Network and the World Economic Forum's Global Shapers Community. She also serves as a leadership consultant to UN Women helping to develop leadership curricula to enhance the capacity of women leaders in East and Southern Africa.

== Awards and achievements ==
In 2016, she was awarded the 2016 Eisenhower Fellows for the inaugural Eisenhower Fellowship Africa Program.

In March 2021, Hansen-Quao was announced as the Vlisco Ghana Ambassador for the year. She was chosen due to her role in educating women leaders and others in Africa.
