= State House, Banjul =

Official residence of the president of the Gambia

Coordinates: 13°27′22″N 16°34′28″W

The State House is the official residence of the president of the Gambia. It was built in colonial days and was the residence of the British governor of the Gambia. Then known as the Government House, it became the residence of the governor-general of the Gambia from 1965 to 1970, when the Gambia became a republic with Sir Dawda Jawara as the first president of the Gambia

According to a false claim by former president Yahya Jammeh, the British did not build the State House.

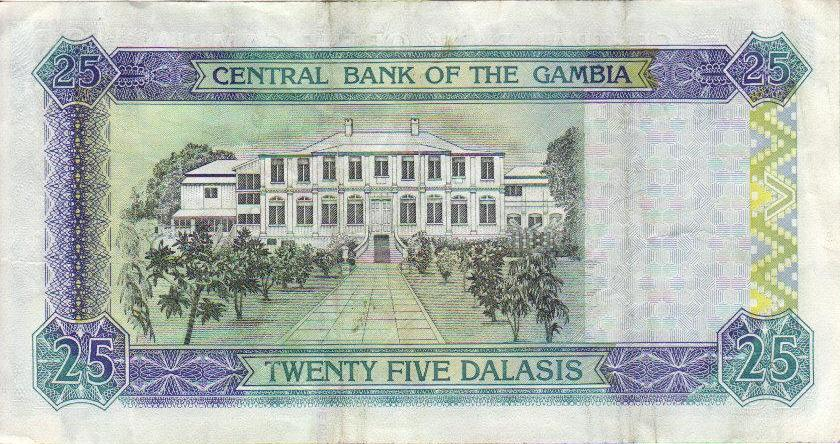
State House is depicted on the 25 Gambian dalasi banknote.

== See also ==
- Government Houses of Africa
- Government Houses of the British Empire
- Governors General of the Gambia
