= Farimang Singhateh =

Last Governor-General of the Gambia (1966–1970)

Sir Farimang Singhateh GCMG

Governor-General of the Gambia
- In office 9 February 1966 – 24 April 1970
- Monarch: Elizabeth II
- Prime Minister: Sir Dawda Jawara
- Preceded by: Sir John Paul
- Succeeded by: Position abolished

Personal details
- Born: 10 November 1912 Georgetown, British Gambia
- Died: 19 May 1977 (aged 64)
- Resting place: Jeshwang cemetery
- Spouse: Lady Fanta Singhateh

Sir Farimang Mamadi Singhateh, GCMG (10 November 1912 – 19 May 1977) was the second and last Governor-General of the Gambia, representing Queen Elizabeth II as head of state. Succeeding Sir John Warburton Paul, who had previously been the last Governor of The Gambia before independence, Sir Farimang was the only Gambian citizen to hold that post, beginning in 1966. His wife Fanta Singhateh was the first Gambian woman to be First Lady. When the country became a republic in 1970, the office was abolished, and the Prime Minister, Dauda (later Sir Dawda) Kairaba Jawara became an executive President.

Sir Farimang Singhateh was working as a dispenser/pharmacist in the Royal Victoria Hospital. He then moved on to have his own clinics in Soma and Farafeni. Before going into the private sector he spent time in Basse and Mansakonko serving those communities. He was appointed as the first black Governor-General by the Queen of the United Kingdom while he was working in his Clinic at Farafenni. Stories have been told that horses were his form of transportation in the early 1940s and 1950s as cars were not available at that time or era. He was an Ahmadi Muslim and Amir (President) of the Gambia's Ahmadiyya community. After The Gambia became a republic Singhateh refrained from any politics until his untimely death in 1977. He went back to his medical practice which was his first love and spent time with his children traveling to Kolda and Dakar in neighboring Senegal to visiting friends and family. A street in the capital, Banjul, was named in his honour.

== Early life ==
Sir Farimang Mamadi Singhateh, a distinguished figure in the Gambia's history was born in 1912 in Georgetown (now Janjanbureh), the Gambia. He hailed from a prominent lineage of Mandinka traders from Wuli, and his grandmother was one of the wives of the renowned Musa Molloh. His early life took a pivotal turn when he was adopted by the wife of a British divisional commissioner, which facilitated his local education in Georgetown.

== Career ==
In 1935, Singhateh began his career in healthcare by volunteering as a medical overseer in Kerewan. His service during World War II saw him attached as a medical probationer to the Royal Army Medical Corps, working in various parts of the Gambia. Demonstrating commitment and expertise, he qualified as a government pharmacist in 1950. Singhateh retired from public service in 1963 as acting senior dispenser, subsequently establishing a renowned pharmacy in Farafenni, which became a cornerstone of the community.

== Political career ==
Beyond his medical career, Singhateh was an influential figure in the social and political spheres. As chairman of the Protectorate Welfare Society and later the Protectorate People's Society, he championed the welfare and interests of rural Gambians. Alongside his wife Fatou Fanta Basse Sagnia, he was an early supporter of the People Progressive Party (PPP), a leading political force in The Gambia's journey toward independence. However, Singhateh withdrew from active politics in1964 upon appointment to the Public Service Commission.

== Governor General ==
In December 1965, Singhateh was appointed acting governor-general of The Gambia, assuming the substantive role in February 1966 after Sir John Paul's departure. He was the first black governor appointed by Queen of England. Stories have been told that horses was his form of transportation in the early 40''s and 50''s as cars were not available at that time or era. He was an Ahmadi and ameer (president) of the Gambia's Ahmadiyya community.

Preceded by Sir John Warburton Paul	Governor-General of the Gambia; 1966–1970	Succeeded by Post abolished Sir Dawda Jawara as 1st. President of the Gambia
