= Gambia Supreme Islamic Council =

Islamic organization based in the Gambia

The Gambia Supreme Islamic Council (GSIC or SIC) is the leading Muslim organization in the West African nation of The Gambia, based in Serekunda.

The organization was founded in 1992 and is made up of some 50 Islamic scholars. The Board of Directors consists of imams from different communities in The Gambia as well as principals various institutions, business people, teachers and opinion leaders. The council also specifies the dates of Muslim holidays in Gambia, such as for Eid al-Adha.

In January 2015, the council aired on state television its decision to declare the Ahmadiyya Islamic movement as a non-Muslim group. The move was condemned by Baba Trawally, the National President of the Gambian Ahmadiyya movement and Demba Ali Jawo, former president of the Gambia Press Union.
