= Dele Jegede =

Nigerian-American painter

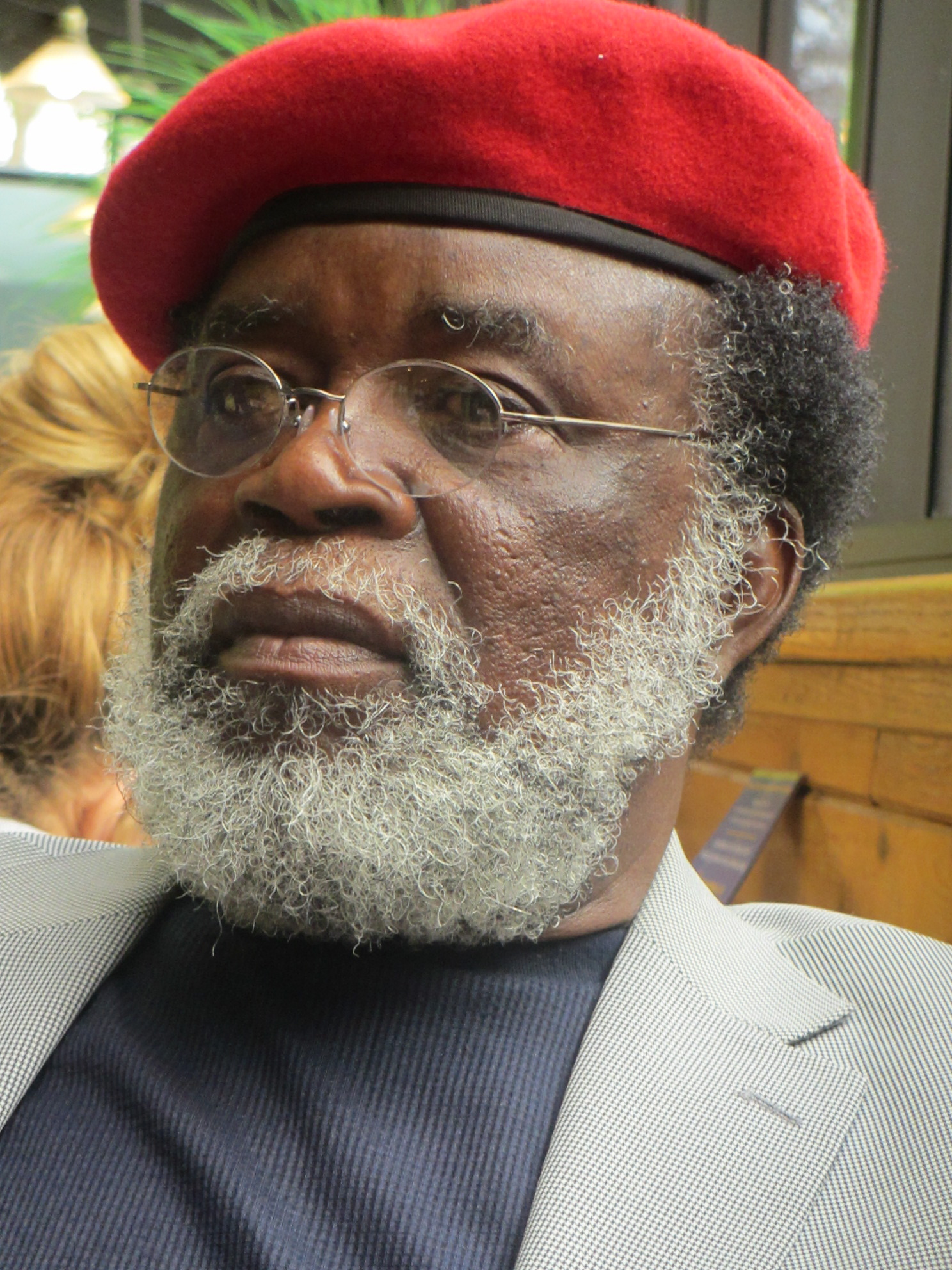
Dele Jegede

Dele Jegede (stylized as dele jegede) is a Nigerian-American painter, art historian, cartoonist, curator, art critic, art administrator, and teacher. Jegede was a Senior Post-Doctoral Fellow at the Smithsonian Institution in Washington, DC, (1995). He taught at Spelman College, Atlanta as Visiting Fulbright Scholar (1987–1988), when he curated the exhibition, Art By Metamorphosis. Listed in Kelly and Stanley's "Nigerian Artists: A Who's Who & Bibliography", Jegede was Professor and Chair of the Department of Art, Indiana State University, Terre Haute (2002–2005) and Professor of Art at Miami University in Oxford, Ohio (2005–2010). He retired as Professor Emeritus in May 2015. Jegede is recipient of the Distinguished Africanist Award of the University of Texas. He is currently the Chairman, board of trustees of the Cartoonists Association of Nigeria (CARTAN).

== Early life and education ==
Dele Jegede was born in 1945 in Ikere-Ekiti, Ekiti State, Nigeria. He earned his first degree in Fine Arts (with First Class Hons, majoring in Painting) from the Ahmadu Bello University, Zaria, Nigeria, in 1973. From 1979 to 1983, he studied art history under Roy Sieber at Indiana University, Bloomington, Indiana, where he received his MA and PhD degrees. His doctoral dissertation, Trends in Contemporary Nigerian Art (Indiana University, 1983), which focuses on the art of Bruce Onobrakpeya and Twins Seven Seven, was the first ever to dwell solely on contemporary Nigerian art.

== Career ==
Jegede began his professional career in Nigeria as a cartoonist and painter. A contemporary of Josy Ajiboye, another cartoonist who focused mainly on social genre, Jegede used his cartoons to comment on the excesses of the privileged and draw attention to social and political issues in general. Aderonke Adesanya, art historian and scholar of contemporary art of Africa, considers Jegede's cartoons as "copious sketches of the skeleton of nation...."

From 1974 to 1977, he was art editor at the Daily Times, Nigeria's most influential daily. Jegede continued to publish weekly cartoons in the Sunday Times, a sister publication of the Daily Times well into the late 1970s when he left for graduate studies at Indiana University. A short while after his return to Nigeria in 1983, he resumed his weekly comic strip, Kole Omole, which featured a precocious five-year-old boy, through whom Jegede took subtle jabs at the military regime. Kjell Knudde ascribes Jegede's legacy and influence on cartooning in Nigeria to the artist's use of cartoons to criticize dictatorial and corrupt regimes in his country.

In 1977, Jegede joined the faculty of the Center for Cultural Studies of the University of Lagos and organized cultural activities in conjunction with the Second World Festival of Black Arts and Culture (FESTAC 77). Among his colleagues at the Center for Cultural Studies of the University of Lagos were Bode Osanyin, a strong follower of Bertolt Brecht and advocate of total theatre. Others there were Joy Nwosu, Akin Euba, and Lazarus Ekwueme, foremost Nigerians in the field of music. Jegede began his career at the University of Lagos as a Junior Research Fellow in 1977 and left in 1992 as Director of the Center for Cultural Studies. He was active not only as a scholar, but also as a painter, with a style that deviated from the dominant social genre. He introduced satire into his paintings and focused on themes of social and political import, as in his 1991 exhibition on Lagos, the cultural and financial capital of Nigeria.

In 1989, Jegede was elected as president of the Society of Nigerian Artists (SNA), succeeding Solomon Wangboje, who was the first Nigerian to hold the doctorate degree in art education. During Jegede's three years as president, he secured a legal charter for the SNA, democratized the structure by creating state chapters, curated a major exhibition, Images of the Nigerian Nation, with an accompanying catalogue of the same title, and led the campaign for the establishment of the National Gallery of Art.

In 1993, Jegede accepted a job offer from Indiana State University, Terre Haute, and relocated there with his family. He has developed and taught courses in studio art and art history.

Jegede is widely acknowledged as one of a corps of African scholars who have continued to shape the direction of the field through their innovative scholarly research and curatorial pursuits. His strong critique of Jean Pigozzi's collection, which is described as the world's largest collection of contemporary African art has drawn a sharp criticism from Thomas McEvilley, who believes that Jegede's criticism lacks credibility because he has spent too much time away from Africa. In turn, Elizabeth Harney contends that McEvilley's position is an essentialist view of who should speak for whom In a critique of Jegede's work, Niyi Osundare sees Jegede as "...a spontaneous, natural artist, singer, actor, dancer, and verbal aficionado, nurtured by the profoundly vibrant, diverse, and inspiring culture of Ukere in the pre-Independence, pre-Pentecostal days [who] has had, right from the early years, all it takes to be a total artist."

In 2017, Jegede was one of a distinguished number of citizens who the Ogoga of Ikere-Ekiti, Oba Adejimi Adu, inducted into the Ikere Hall of Fame.

In 2018, Jegede was inducted into the Society of Nigerian Artists Hall of Fame, one of a cohort of 20 Nigerian artists, including Ben Enwonwu, Yusuf Grillo and Demas Nwoko, who were accorded the honour at the maiden edition.

== Public collections ==
Jegede's art is on display in various public and private collections in Nigeria and the United States.

- National Gallery of Art (Nigeria)
- John Holt (Nigeria)
- University of Lagos (Nigeria)
- Lagos State of Nigeria government
- National Council for Arts and Culture
- Private collections in Nigeria and the U.S.

== Publications ==
Jegede's publications include:

- Contemporary African Art: Five Artists, Diverse Trends. Indianapolis: Indianapolis Museum of Art, 2000
- Women to Women: Weaving Cultures, Shaping History. Terre Haute: University Art University Gallery, 2000
- Encyclopedia of African American Artists: Artists of the American Mosaic. Westport, Connecticut: Greenwood Press, 2009
- Peregrinations: A Solo Exhibition of Drawings and Paintings. Lagos: Nike Gallery, 2011
- Bruce Onobrakpeya: Mask of the Flaming Arrows. (ed.), Milan: 5 Continents, 2014
- Transitions: A Solo Exhibition of Paintings and Drawings. Austin: Pan African University, 2016
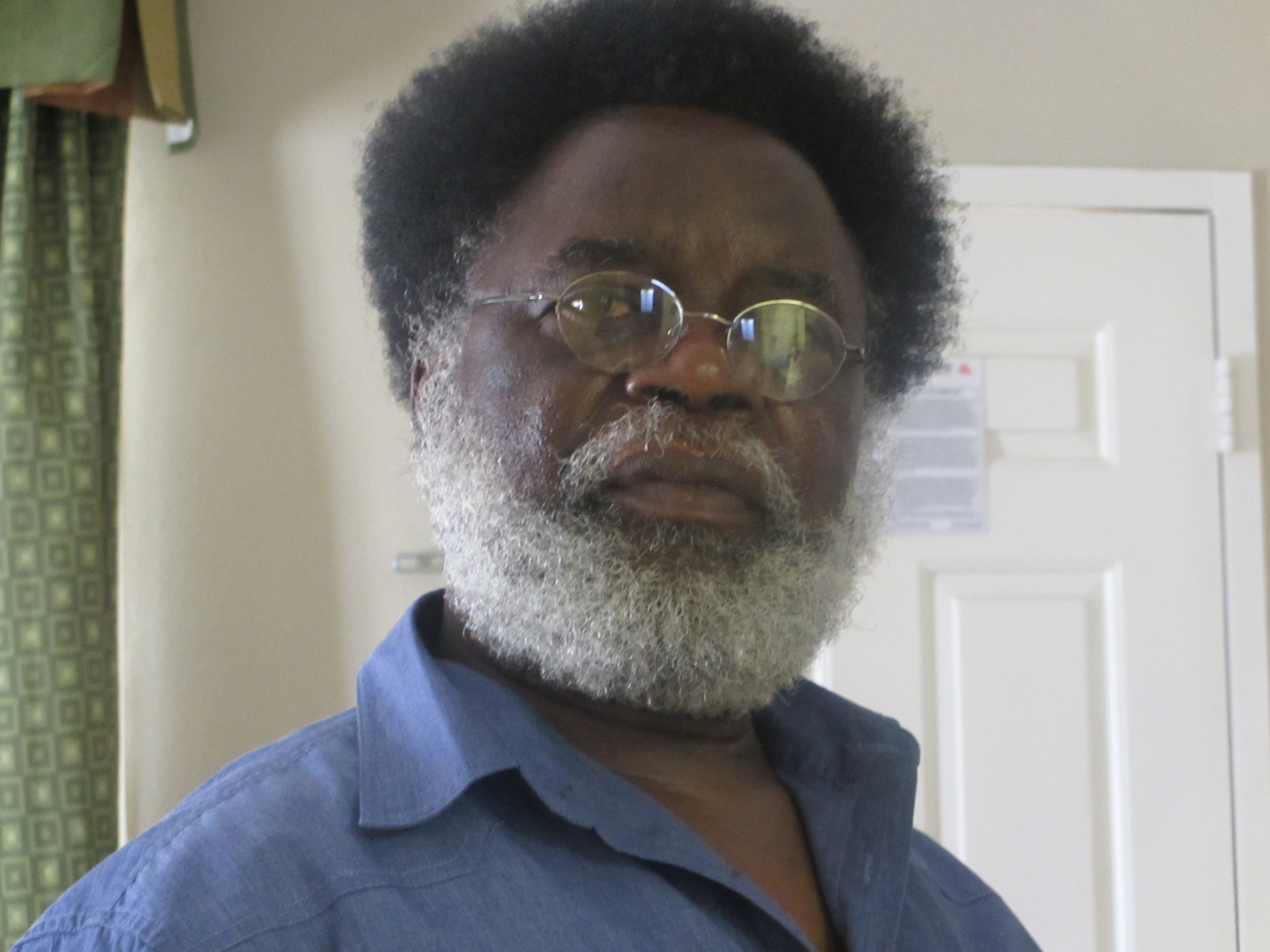

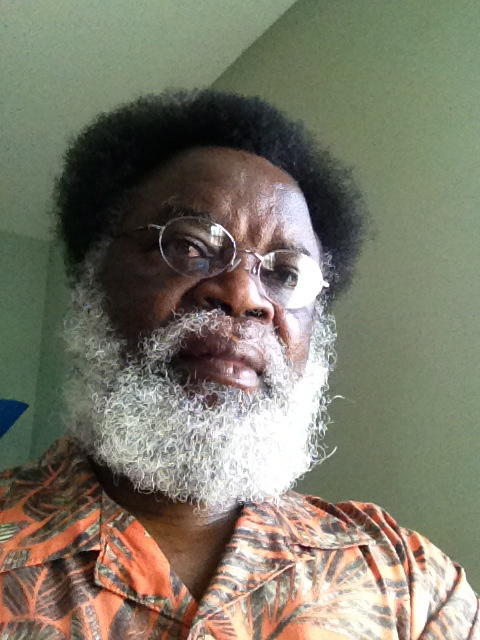

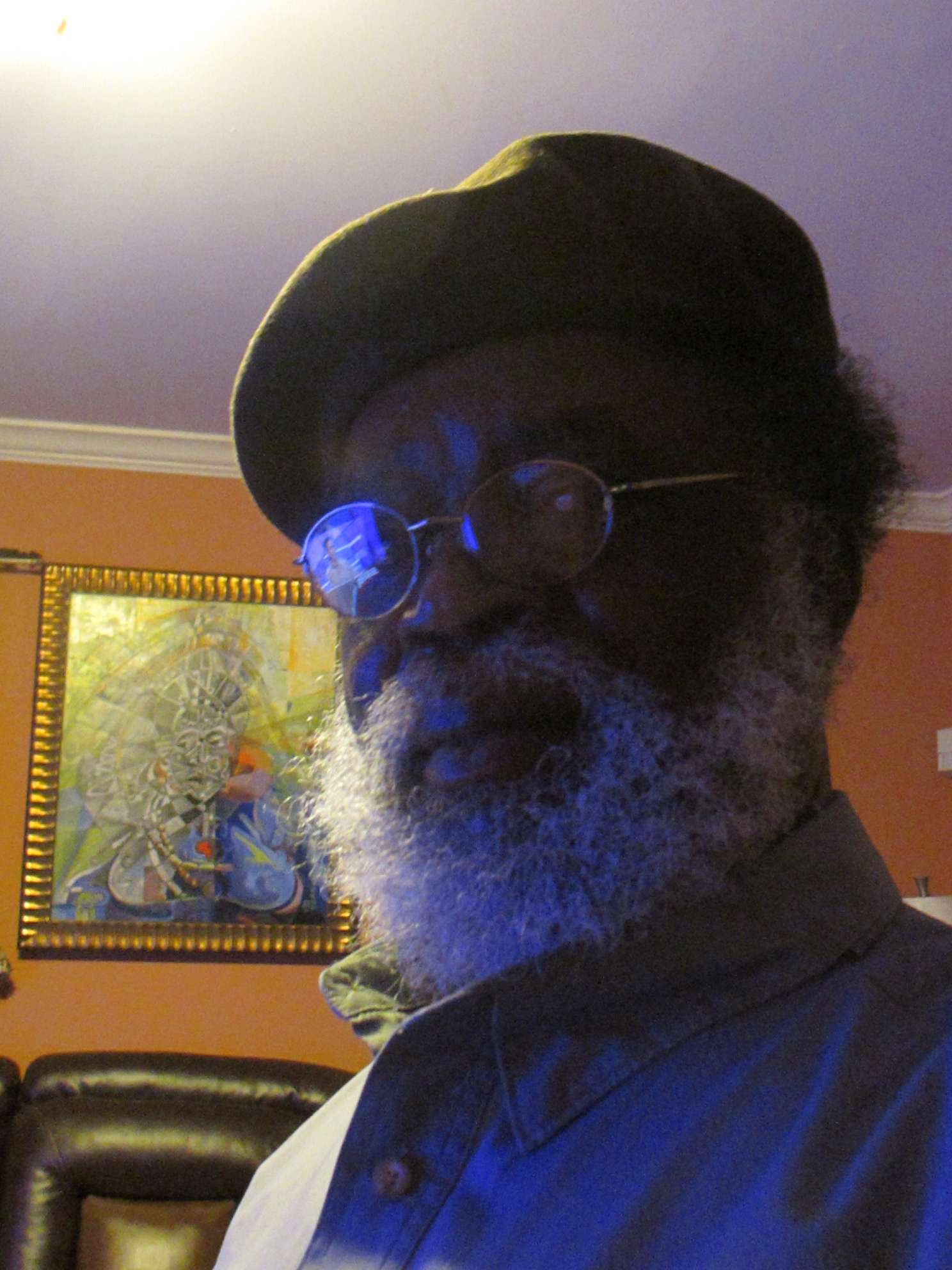
