= Chike Aniakor =

Nigerian painter (born 1939)

- Born: 1939 (age 86–87); Abatete, Anambra State
- Education: Ahmadu Bello University, Zaria

Chike C. Aniakor (born 21 August 1939) is a Nigerian artist, art historian, author, and poet whose work addresses philosophical, political, and religious themes relating to Igbo society and the Nigerian Civil War. His artworks are held in major metropolitan museums including the Smithsonian Institution, Nigerian National Gallery of Art, and the Museum fur Volkerkunde in Frankfurt. Aniakor is a prolific writer and has authored over 75 books and articles.

== Early life ==
Chike Cyril Aniakor was born in Abatete, Anambra State in Eastern Nigeria on 21 August 1939. His mother was a practicing Uli artist; an art style deriving from Igbo culture. His early exposure to Igbo traditions fostered his interest in their dance, art, ritual, and architectural styles.

== Education ==
From 1960 to 1964, Aniakor attended the Nigerian College of Arts, Science, and Technology, (NCAST) Zaria, Kaduna State (renamed Ahmadu Bello University,Zaria), where he received his bachelor's degree in painting. He did his graduate work at Indiana University, Bloomington, where he received a master's (1974) and doctorate (1978) in art history. During his time at Indiana University, his paintings and poetry were displayed at numerous art shows, granting him public recognition and academic fellowships, including the Rockefeller Award. After graduation, he taught at Southern University in New Orleans, UCLA, and Howard University.

Since the 1970s, he has taught art and art history at the University of Nigeria, Nsukka (UNN), Enugu State, where he became a founding a member of the Nsukka group, which was later widely known for their use of the Uli art style. He was also the founder of the university's art department, which was commended for their virtuosity scholars and students as well as showcasing their artists to the international art scene.

== Career ==
=== Igbo culture ===
From 1965 to 1971, Aniakor began his teaching career at the Community Secondary School, Nnobi. He spent his time educating his students on Igbo art in particular, as the overall culture was the beginning motivator for Aniakor's own artworks. The Igbo community was located East of the Niger River. Aniakor saw art stemming from the location as one that needed scrutiny in order to make statements regarding its artistic development, which led to the location becoming the setting for his later fieldwork studies.

Along with the fundamentals of art, Aniakor guided students on how to take inspiration from Igbo artistic tradition as his personal work mainly contained Igbo symbols, imageries, and techniques of elaborate surface decoration. He educated students on the criteria to evaluate art specifically from the culture as well as the Igbo sense of pride and connection to their ancestry. In addition, he helped train students to understand Uli art ideology, painting, and history by exhibiting modern intellectualism towards the subject. From 1968 to 1969, he worked as an art editor at the Ministry of Information, Enugu, Nigeria. He continued his teachings at the University of Nigeria, Nsukka, in 1970.

Aniakor developed the Nsukka Art Department with other staff members who worked at the University of Nigeria with him to help expand upon Igbo stylistic range. During the 1970s, Nigerian artist Uche Okeke worked with Aniakor to establish the Nsukka group, an association consisting of members from the department to focus on producing and reviving the Uli style of art. Aniakor was among the first Nsukka artists to develop an interest in Uli, eventually leading the group to be known for its use of the style. The group practiced indigenous aesthetic preference related to Uli, which simultaneously showed their sensibility towards Igbo culture . They found it necessary to study these indigenous traditions as their work as contemporary artists would inevitably become multifaceted. The Nsukka group consisted of Tayo Adenaike, El Anatsui, Olu Oguibe, Uche Okeke, Ada Udechukwu, Obiora Udechukwu, and Aniakor himself.

Aniakor later became an instructor at the Southern University of New Orleans, from 1978 to 1979, before returning to Nsukka. His methodology on conducting data about Igbo customs during his stay in the United States consisted of interviewing other artists as well as his students. In 1984, he became a research associate at UCLA, focusing on further research about Igbo arts and culture, aiming to address the modernism of Nigeria that was seen in the early twentieth century alongside ideologies of decolonization.

Due to his intense study and will to understand the worldview of Igbo, Herbert Cole, a scholar at UCLA, helped co write the book Igbo Arts: Community and Cosmos with Aniakor to analyse Igbo visual culture in relation to their deities, God and goddesses, spirits, and nature. The book was considered an important building block to understanding African culture in the 1980s. Aniakor continued his research of Igbo art history in a periodical titled Uwa ndi Igbo: Journal of Igbo Life and Culture separately from Cole.

From 1986 to 1988, he returned to Nigeria once more to become the director of the Institute of African Studies, University of Nigeria, Nsukka.

=== 1990s–present ===
From 1994 to 1995, Aniakor became a senior fellow at the Metropolitan Museum in New York, where his drawings put on view his Igbo roots. In 1996, he worked at the African Studies Centre of Howard University in Washington DC, holding fellowship in oral literature within the studies. He contributed to the development of organizations such as the Society of Nigerian Artists and the International Society for Education. He returned to the University of Nigeria in 1995, leading up to his retirement in 2005.

His artworks and writings have been featured in both international and local magazines and journals as he has published various works through different media forms. Aniakor uses his social experiences as a form of communication, self-expression, and favours diversity as a means to express his beliefs towards humanity.

== Artworks ==
=== Uli ===
Aniakor aimed to reinvent the Uli art style since he rejected traditional European art forms. Traditionally, Uli consisted of geometric shapes, symbols, motifs, and patterns, using plants and other materials derived from earth to decorate walls and bodies, usually during ceremonies.

Aniakor wanted to better understand Uli's connection to traditional African expression in order to create new creative idioms within artwork. He studied how to use those newly found idioms in a contemporary environment, aiming to create a movement that favoured linearity and spatial design. Spatial design, in terms of organizing space, was crucial in Igbo culture as it was a form of symbolism. The design indicated their achievements even when faced with space constraint, as achievement was their most important element of sociocultural value. In the context of artwork, the design helped with stylistic interpretation of works with symbolism translating to vitality, triumph, and their experience of life.

The driving force behind his effort to transform Uli was the concept of a historical reconstruction. He provided awareness of the elements used within Uli motifs, which he saw as dialogical to the negative space surrounding it in his works, as well as Nigerian cultural history beyond rituality to construct conceptual considerations. He did so by using ethnographic teaching combined with visual arts.

He further aimed to transform Uli into one of both social landscape as well as spirituality involving the cosmos, exploring that facet within Igbo society by combining celestial images and his own imagery. This included presenting human values onto spiritual entities, demonstrating the reciprocity between man and nature.

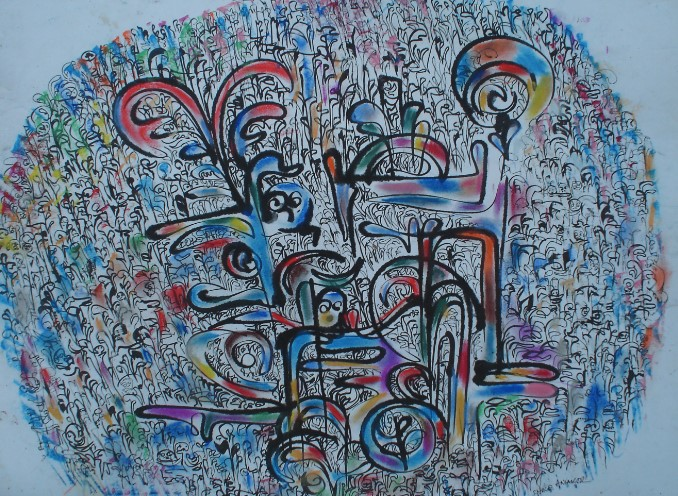
Rhythms of New Life, 2001.

Rhythms of New Life (2001) consisted of pen, ink, and watercolor on paper measuring 70 cm by 50 cm (27 x 19 in). The drawing displays a variety of textured, flickering lines, translating to the anxiety of daily life. With floral-like curves, linear texture mixed with mass form was frequently combined in Aniakor's work to achieve rhythm. Curvilinear linework was a staple in Uli art as Aniakor wrote that it was element that made artworks most visually appealing to the eye. Contoured patterns were favored to fill any empty space to help move the eye along the piece. Aniakor's practice of these elements suggested his sense of community and reverence to the Igbo artistic space.

=== Biafran War ===
Aniakor's connection to Igbo culture was found to explain the figures he used within his own artwork. Congregated figures helped form archetypal visual images that he found defined the Igbo community, as he held the belief that in Igbo culture no individual was isolated in their struggle. Using this notion, he has been able to curate works that describe the struggle and collective despair those in the community felt while experiencing displacement during the Biafran War alongside his own perspective and narrative of the war from his personal experience. The war affected Igbo artists as problems including endemic corruption and political hegemony were new experiences for them. Issues of military control in Nigeria continue to be a sensitive subject for Igbo artists, with their work being a response to the disappointments they endured.

Civil strife was the main theme within Aniakors personal work concerning the Nigerian-Biafran war, with focus brought to the act of social unrest in the Igbo community at the time. Using bold lines, optical illusions, linear contours, and negative space he aimed to create a sensation of movement to depict messages of people physically moving away from troubled zones. These were symbolic of the fear the Igbo community felt at the time, and how the use of rhythm indicated Aniakor's understanding of how war and movement work together as a design structure within artworks.

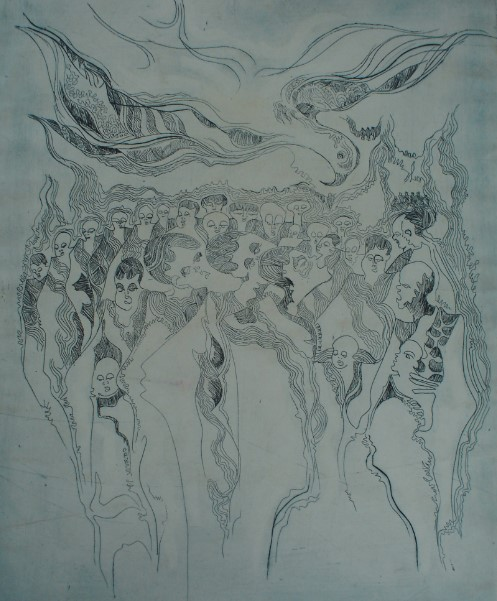
Descent of the Falcon, 1993.

Descent of the Falcon (1993) was executed using line etching on paper measuring 70 cm by 50 cm (27 x 19 in). The piece depicts a falcon hovering over a crowd of people gathered together with worried expressions upon their faces. His use of mask like features for the faces played a role in representing the masks used especially among the Igbo as well as masks used in other African societies. He often made use of negative space by drawing his human figures with elongated, stretched out bodies.

Using the metaphor of a beast-prey relationship, the drawing describes the relationship between the government and the people of Nigeria during the height of the military junta. The falcon, representing Biafran in this piece, is seen metaphorically swooping down towards the people of Nigeria as their prey, imparting what they felt was disharmony upon their life. The use of crowded figures aimed to tell the story of despair that people endured under military authority, using this as a method to communicate Aniakor's own personal and political statements.

=== 1970–2000 ===
Aniakor's work from 1970 to 2000 continued to represent the relationship that the Igbo community had to Nigerian military regimes as they simultaneously captured the socioeconomic state of Nigeria at the time. Using images of aggregation and spatial design helped translate his concerns of the constant conflict implemented between military junta and the Nigerian masses, demonstrating an imbalanced system.

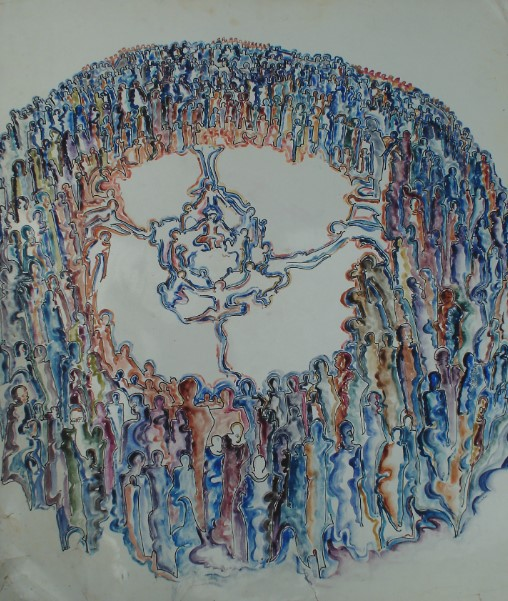
Seasonal Ritual, 1990.

Seasonal Ritual (1990) was created using pen, ink, and watercolor on paper measuring 70 cm by 50 cm (27 x 19 in). The piece displays a circle of people connected to a smaller group of people in the center. The center symbolizes community, how it connects to Aniakor's creativity, and how it plays a role in everyday society.

This piece is also representative of political views Aniakor held with regard to the Igbo community. In Seasonal Ritual, the center creates movement to those connected to it. To Aniakor, it can either represent guiding the masses towards mobilization against an enemy or executing a disorderly plan with undetermined consequences.

=== Poetry ===
Aniakor currently has a small body of freeverse poetry mainly released in the United States, Europe, and Nigeria. His poetry aimed to illustrate the meaning behind his drawings as he held the viewpoint that written vocabulary is just as important in getting his artistic message across. Juxtaposed to his paintings, he frequently used African motifs and symbolic figures to represent African communication styles as well as the African nature of obedience. His poetry addresses Igbo life, experiences, and the nostalgia he felt towards his time spent there. Historical development and stylistic analysis were two additional things that shaped Aniakors writings, frequently labeling his poetry as visual epitaphs.

Come to me in silence if you can, like ripples of water from yesterday’s rain.

— Chike Aniakor, In Silence I Wait

== Selected exhibitions ==
=== Group exhibitions ===
- African Artists in America: An Exhibition of Work by 20 African Artists Living in America, African American Institute, New York, USA 1977
- The Nsukka School: Paintings, Drawings, Prints, Sculpture, Ceramics, Contemporary Arts Gallery, Rivers State Council for Arts & Culture, Port Harcourt, February 1–28, 1979
- Drawings, Prints and Watercolours: Okike Tenth Anniversary, University of Nigeria, Nsukka, April 1982
- Man in Focus, National Theatre, Lagos, December 20, 1985 – January 10, 1986
- 6 New Painters from Nsukka, British Council, Enugu, Nigeria 1996
- Poetics of Line: Seven Artists of the Nsukka Group, National Museum of African Art, Smithsonian Institution, Washington, D.C., October 22, 1997 – April 26, 1998
- Visionary: Viewpoints on Africa's Arts, National Museum of African Art, Smithsonian Institution, Washington, D.C., November 4, 2017 – June 5, 2019
- Encounters with the Contemporary, National Museum of African Art, Smithsonian Institution, Washington, D.C., January 7, 2001 – January 6, 2002
- Layers, Labanque Béthune, Béthune, France, January 2020
- "Kindred Spirits:A Gathering Of The AKA Circle Of Artists", Kó Ikoyi, Lagos, October 31st - December 21, 2024
- ‘’Nigerian Modernism:Art And Independence’’, Tate Modern London, 8th October 2025 - 10th May 2026
- ‘’The Art Of African Modernism’’, Alliance Francaise Ikoyi Lagos, 14th February - 28th February 2026

=== Solo exhibitions ===
- The Visions of My Ikenga, National Museum, Lagos, December 20–25, 1972
- Gluck Gallery and Eigemmen Hall, Indiana University, Bloomington, Indiana,1974
- Drawings and Paintings, Southern University in New Orleans, Louisiana, USA, 1978
- Images of the Mind, Rivers State Council for Arts & Culture, Port Harcourt, 1979
- The Pan African University, Victoria Island, 2006
- ‘’Thoughts And Reflections’’, Thought Pyramid Art Centre Wuse 2 Abuja,18th November 2025.
- ‘Thoughts And Reflections’’, New Capital School Asokoro Abuja, Federal Capital Territory, 22nd November 2025.

== Collections ==
Aniakor's work is held in major collections including the Smithsonian Institution's National Museum of African Art (Washington, D.C.), Asele Institute (Nimo, Anambra, Nigeria), Didi Museum (Lagos, Nigeria), Federal Ministry of Information, Cultural Division, (Lagos, Nigeria), Imago Mundi Collection (Treviso, Italy), Iwalewa House (Bayreuth, Germany), National Gallery of Art (Lagos, Nigeria), University of Nigeria, Ana Gallery, Nsukka (Enugu State, Nigeria), and The Weltkulturen Museum (Frankfurt, Germany)

== Honors and awards ==
- First prize painting, First National Union of Nigerian Students Cultural Festival, University of Ibadan, 1964
- Postgraduate scholarship in art history, British Council, Lagos, 1972
- Rockefeller Award, 1984

== Bibliography ==
=== Books ===
- Clay Sculpture and Mbari Houses (with Herbert M. Cole)
- The Visions of My Ikenga: Exhibition of Drawings, Prints, and Paintings at the National Museum Onikan, Lagos (With Uche Okeke) (1972)
- Igbo Architecture: A Study of Forms, Functions and Typology (1979)
- The Masquerade in Nigerian History and Culture, Chapter 13: Igbo Arts as an Environment: Analysis of Mask Headdresses (176–198) (1980)
- Igbo Architecture (1982)
- Igbo Arts: Community and Cosmos (Foreword by Chinua Achebe) (1984)
- Igbo Household Objects: Their Conceptual and Formal Dynamics in Space (1988)
- Ojadili: The Clever Wrestler (1992)
- Cultural Objects as History and National Patrimony: A Moral Challenge (1995)
- The Market Paradigm and Igbo Notions of Spirit Embodiment: Conceptual Considerations (1996)
- Fang (1998)
- Problems, Issues and Challenges in Igbo Masking Studies (1999)
- Crossroads: Africa in the twilight: Afrika Heritage (2000)
- Pan-African Circle of Artists (with PACA Biennale and C. Krydz Ikwuemesi) (2000)
- Reflective Essays on Art & Art History (2005)

=== Articles ===
- "Structuralism in Ikenga: An Ethnoaesthetic Approach". Journal of African Studies (1973)
- "The Broad Synthesis of African Arts: A Survey of Their Significant Aspects" (1976)
- "House Types and Decorations in Southern Nigeria". Presence Africaine (Paris) (1978)
- "The Omabe Cult and Masking Tradition". Nsukka Environment (1978)
- "The Living Culture of Nigeria". Ufahamu: A Journal of African Studies (1977)
- "House Types and Decoration in Southern Nigeria". Presence Africaine (1978)
- "The Omabe Festival". Nigeria Magazine (Lagos) (1978)
- "The Igbo Ijele Mask". African Arts Los Angeles 11(4) (1978)
- "Contemporary Nigerian Artists and Their Traditions". Black Art New York (1980)
- "Space Concepts in the Architectural Planning of an Igbo Village". Nigeria Magazine (1980)
- "Igbo Aesthetics: An Introduction". Nigeria Magazine (Lagos) (1982)
- "Ikenga Arts and Igbo Cosmos" (1984)
- "The Concept of Symbolism of the Centre in African Architecture". Readings in African Humanities Traditional and Modern Cultures (1985)
- "Igbo Art as an Environment: The Example of Mask Headdresses". Nigeria Magazine (Lagos) (1985)
- "The State of Igbo Art Studies". Nigeria Magazine (1986)
- "Igbo Life, Worldview, And Cosmography". Genève-Afrique 26 (1) (1988)
- "Igbo Plastic and Decorative Arts". Nsukka Journal of Humanities (1988)
- "El Anatsui: Visual Incantations". Art Papers Atlanta (1990)
- "Cultural Objects as History and National Patrimony: A Moral Challenge". Proceedings of the Annual Meeting (American Society of International Law) (1995)
- "Visual Arts: Critical Appraisal of Cultural Policy for Nigeria". Creative Dialogue: SNA at 25 (1990)
- "Material Culture & Ethnography in Ibgoland and Environs: Looking Beyond Igbo-Ukwu Bronze Objects (A Reappraisal of Techniques, Style and Iconography)". West African journal of archaeology (1993)
- "'Do All Cultural Roads Lead to Benin?' The Missing Factor in Benin and Related Art Studies. A Conceptual View". Paideuma: Mitteilungen zur Kulturkunde (1997)
- "Harmful Cultural Practices in the Context of the Right to Health". Institute of African Studies 1(4) (2009)
- "Indigenous Knowledge and Global Changes in Africa: History, Concepts, and Logic". International conference on Indigenous Knowledge in Africa (2011)

=== Poems ===
- "An Arrow Flight"
- "Descent into the Abyss"
- "Homage"
- "In Silence I Wait"
- "My Love"
- "My Surrogate"
- "Mummy"
- "Only a Thought"
- "Sunset"
- "The Maiden Spirit"
- "These Voices Again!"
