= Solomon Wangboje =

Nigerian visual artist, master printmaker, arts educator, and academic

Solomon Irein Wangboje (1930-1998) was a leading 20th-century Nigerian visual artist, master printmaker, arts educator, and academic.

== Early life and education ==
Wangboje was born in 1930 in Edo State.

He attended Edo College, Benin City, from 1946-50, and then the Nigeria College of Arts, Science and Technology in Zaria (now Ahmadu Bello University) from 1955-59, where he was one of eight students in the initial student intake into the Fine Arts program. With fellow artists including Demas Nwoko, Uche Okeke, and Bruce Onobrakpeya among others, he was part of the Zaria Art Society, which came together to explore indigenous Nigerian art as opposed to against Western art. Etso Clara Ugbodaga-Ngu, the first Nigerian and the first woman to become a professor at NCAST, was one of his teachers and later served as a fellow faculty member.

Wangboje earned a Master of Fine Arts degree in printmaking from Cranbrook Academy of Arts in 1963 before receiving a doctorate in Art Education (Ed.D) from New York University in 1968, the first Nigerian to hold this degree. His thesis was entitled "A Program of Art Education for Prospective Teachers of Art in the Secondary Schools of Nigeria."

== Career ==
Wangboje was appointed Publications Artist and Graphic Arts Specialist, Federal Ministry of Information, 1959-63, and Design and Art Supervisor, Nigerian Television Service,1964-65.

He became the first Nigerian Professor of Fine Arts in 1973 at the Ahmadu Bello University, Zaria, after having worked as a research fellow at the then University of Ife (now Obafemi Awolowo University). In 1968, the Ori-Olokun Cultural Centre was established at Ile-Ife, affiliated with the Institute of African Studies, University of Ife under the directorship of Michael Crowder, where Wangboje organized and led the art workshops.

He was appointed in 1978 as the first Professor of Creative Arts at the University of Benin and later became Deputy Vice-Chancellor.

Professor Wangboje was known for his influence on generations of students: "Wangboje wrote extensively on Nigerian art education, distinguishing himself as an innovative educator who fought hard for the inclusion of creative arts as core subjects in primary, secondary, and teacher-training education." His students have included Nigerian artist and cartoonist Josy Aiboye and printmaker and teacher Ufuoma Onobrakpeya.

== Artistic works and accomplishments ==
According to scholar Chika Okeke-Ahulua, Wangboje is considered one of the first modern printmakers in Nigeria whose virtuosity in printmaking was more technical than conceptual. His printmaking oeuvres reveal "prolific usage of African cultural motifs blended with contemporary daily life of the Nigerian people." Wangboje believed that contemporary African artists have a collective responsibility, according to Christopher Adejumo, "to reconstruct the limiting legacy of colonialism by rejuvenating traditional aesthetics and cultural values."

Wangboje produced over 35 prints between 1960 and the 1990s, making a great impact on modern Nigerian art. His print series included “Romance of the Headload,” a "visual narrative of economic subsistence and survival" and “Festival of the Gods.”

The collection of African poems edited by Leonard Doob, A Crocodile Has Me by My Leg (1967) and Animals Mourn for Da Leopard and Other West African Stories (1970) were illustrated with woodcuts and linoleum cuts by Wangboje.

Wangboje's works were included in the Smithsonian Institution Traveling Exhibit of Contemporary African Printmakers 1966-1968. Wangboje participated in the seminal FESTAC '77 festival.

Wangboje's works were included in the 2024 exhibit African Modernism in America, 1947-67 at The Phillips Collection and the exhibit Bruce Onobrakpeya: The Mask and the Cross exhibit at the National Museum of African Art. They are also in the holdings of the National Gallery of Modern Art, Lagos; in the Harmon Foundation's collection at Hampton University Museum, Hampton, Virginia; National Museum of African Art, Washington, DC; and Detroit Institute of Arts.

Wangboje was a founding member and past president of the Society of Nigerian Artists (SNA). He also served on the World Council for the International Society for Education through Arts and delivered the speech "Cultural Identity and Realisation through the Arts: Problems, Possibilities and Projections" at its 1986 Congress.

== Personal life ==
Wangboje married Florence Ehiozogie Amadasu in 1960. They had two sons and six daughters together, including muralist Emida Roller and Mrs Iwoje Wangboje-Eguavoen, a lawyer and gallery owner.
