= Nsukka group =

Name for Nigerian artists from University of Nigeria, Nsukka

- Known for: artists
- Notable work: uli
- Movement: Nsukka group

The Nsukka group is the name given to a group of Nigerian artists associated with the University of Nigeria, Nsukka.

== Description ==
The Nsukka group was known for working to revive the practice of uli and incorporate its designs into contemporary art using media such as acrylic paint, tempera, gouache, pen and ink, pastel, oil paint, and watercolor. Although traditionally uli artists were female, many of the artists of the group were male. Some were poets and writers in addition to being artists.

The Nsukka group evolved as a trend that can be sensed in the works of some African artists. It usually reveals itself an original mix of cubism and primitive arts.

In October 1997, the National Museum of African Art of the Smithsonian Institution launched the exhibition The Poetics of the Line: Seven Artists of the Nsukka Group, which also was the inaugural exhibition of the Sylvia H. Williams Gallery.

== Members ==
- Tayo Adenaike
- El Anatsui
- Chike Aniakor
- Olu Oguibe
- Uche Okeke
- Ada Udechukwu
- Obiora Udechukwu

== Bibliography ==
- Simon Ottenberg (1997). New traditions from Nigeria : seven artists of the Nsukka group. Smithsonian Institution Press. ISBN 9781560988007.
