= Zaria Art Society =

The Zaria Art Society (also called Zaria Rebels) was a coalition of artists that lasted from 1958 to 1962. The society was notable for their rejection of the precepts of their mainly British art lecturers whose curriculum was focused Western. They rather adopted and promoted local visual art traditions like Nok sculptures and the Uli painting. The style of art promoted by the Zaria Art Society is now called natural synthesis.

The society included Jimoh Akolo, Yusuf Grillo, Ogbonaya Nwagbara, Demas Nwoko, Emmanuel Odita, Simon Okeke, Uche Okeke, Bruce Onobrakpeya, Oseloka Osadebe, and Solomon Wangboje.

== History ==
In 1958, a group of students at the Nigeria College of Arts, Science and Technology in Zaria (now Ahmadu Bello University) came together to explore indigenous Nigerian art as opposed to against Western art. The notably rebelled through the concept of natural synthesis. Each member explored their Nigerian heritage with Western expressions to drive new conversations about art at the time. They explored how society had developed from being traditional and colonial to being more modern and independent.

Their art was shown to lecturers, as they frowned on students' attempts to stage exhibitions outside the college. The movement was ended in 1962 as each of the artists moved on to pursue their own careers.

== Natural synthesis ==
Natural synthesis is an art style that blends elements from local Nigerian visual traditions with modern techniques. Instead of copying traditional forms exactly, artists use them as inspiration to create new, modern Nigerian designs and symbols.
