= Marcia Kure =

Nigerian artist

- Born: 1970 (age 55–56); Kano State, Nigeria
- Education: University of Nigeria, Nsukka, Haystack Mountain School of Crafts, Deer Isle, ME
- Website: Official website

Marcia Kure (born 1970) is a Nigerian visual artist known for her mixed media paintings and drawings that explore themes of identity, history, and the lasting effects of colonialism. Trained at the University of Nigeria, Nsukka, her work often incorporates imagery of veiled women and references to fashion and textiles, and frequently addresses gender and political themes. Her work has been exhibited internationally in museums and galleries across Africa, Europe, and the United States.

== Early life and education ==
Kure was born in Kano State, Nigeria. She trained at the University of Nigeria, Nsukka under Obiora Udechukwu, graduating in 1994 with a Bachelor of Arts in painting.

== Professional career and work ==
Kure's early work focused on political violence and the agency of women in patriarchal society. An example of this period is her series History of Africa by Fela (2001-2003), which consists of 59 panels executed in ink, kolanut pigment, and pencil on paper. Her later work is concerned with themes related to motherhood, haute couture (exclusive, custom-made) fashion, hip-hop aesthetics, and her experience of expatriation. The Purdy Hicks Gallery describes Kure's style as having strong links to contemporary uli, a graphic-intensive art tradition of Igbo women of eastern Nigeria that is characterized by linear forms and minimal use of color. Her drawings are also described as combining sweeping and swirling strokes with bold shapes and symbolic decorative motifs drawn from diverse African visual traditions. She often incorporates traditional African pigments, including kola nut and coffee.

Images of veiled women have been a recurring motif in Kure’s work since Purdah (1992). She revisits this imagery often, incorporating textiles to examine relationships between gender and power. Her work explores gender roles and boundaries, as seen in Woman as Warrior (1997), which shows a female figure with attributes associated with male authority, as well as in works about motherhood. In 2002, her work was included in Multichoice Africa’s African Artists of the Future calendar.

In a 2015 interview for ARTCTUALITE, Kure described her interest in working between opposing ideas and perspectives, stating: "I prefer the gray area that deals directly with oppositions and juxtapositions. [...] I think the assimilation of western forms and techniques in my work allows me to integrate and interpret the world through a prismatic lens much better than one who has a singular view."

Kure is represented by Susan Inglett Gallery (New York), Purdy Hicks Gallery (London) and Officine Dell'Immagine (Milan). She currently lives and works in Princeton, New Jersey and Abuja and Kaduna, Nigeria.

=== Exhibitions and collections ===
Kure has had eight solo exhibitions and has participated in over forty group exhibitions internationally. She first exhibited her work in a New York group show at the Skoto Gallery in 1995. She has also been in the 1997 exhibition Cross/ing: Time • Space • Movement, curated by Olu Oguibe, which showcased contemporary African artists working internationally. Her solo exhibition Cloth as Identity (2000) at the Goethe-Institut in Lagos featured a performance in which women wearing burkas performed hip hop–style dance to Afrobeat music. She has also had solo exhibitions at Purdy Hicks Gallery in London and Susan Inglett Gallery in New York.

Kure's work has been exhibited internationally across Southwest Asia, Europe, North America, and Africa. She has participated in international art events including the 2005 Sharjah International Biennial, the 2006 International Biennial of Contemporary Art in Seville (curated by Okwui Enwezor), and La Triennial in 2013. Her work has been included in group exhibitions at institutions such as the New Museum in New York and Barbican Art Galleries in London. Kure’s work has also been shown at the National Museum of African Art at the Smithsonian Institution, British Museum, Centre Pompidou, and the Menil Drawing Institute in Houston.

From January to March 2014, Kure was artist-in-residence at the Victoria and Albert Museum in London.

=== Accolades ===
Kure has received several notable awards and grants throughout her career, such as the Uche Okeke Prize for Drawing in 1994. She was awarded the Elena Prentice Rulon-Miller Scholarship Fund and the Minority Work Study Grant at the Haystack Mountain School of Crafts in 2004. Later, she received the Smithsonian Artist Research Fellowship from the Smithsonian Institution and a Program Puffin Grant for the Burqua as Shelter sculpture from The Puffin Foundation (2007–2008).

=== Teaching ===
Kure has held teaching positions at various institutions. In 2004, she completed a teaching internship in St. Mark’s School, Southborough, Massachusetts. In 2019, she taught at the Royal Institute of Art in Stockholm, Sweden.
