= Udechukwu =

- Gender: Male
- Language(s): Igbo

Origin
- Word/name: Nigeria
- Meaning: God's fame

Udechukwu audio is a surname of Igbo origin in South eastern Nigeria. It means “God’s fame”.

== Notable people with the surname include ==
- Ada Udechukwu (born 1960), Nigerian artist and poet
- Obiora Udechukwu (born 1946), Nigerian painter and poet
