= Tayo Adenaike =

Nigerian painter (born 1954)

- Born: 1954 (age 71–72); Warri, Nigeria
- Education: Federal Government College, Warri; University of Nigeria, Nsukka (BA Fine Arts, 1979; MFA, 1982)
- Known for: Watercolor paintings incorporating uli, akika, and nsibidi designs Themes from Yoruba heritage and personal experiences
- Notable work: Eighteen solo exhibitions
- Style: Painting; Watercolor
- Movement: Nsukka group Contemporary Nigerian art

Tayo Adenaike (born 1954) is a Nigerian painter was born in Warri and lives in Enugu, he is the native of Idanre, in southwestern Nigeria.

== Biography ==
A native of Idanre, in Ijebu-Imushin, Ogun State, Adenaike is of Yoruba parentage. In 1967 he was first introduced to formal instruction in arts at Federal Government College, located in Warri, in the present Delta State. He won second prize in the All Nigeria Secondary School National Art Workshop held at Ahmadu Bello University, Zaria. This accomplishment among other things encouraged Adenaike to continue studying art at the University of Nigeria, Nsukka, with Obiora Udechukwu. Here he received his bachelor's degree in Fine Arts 1979 and his masters of Fine Arts in 1982. Since then he has largely worked in advertising and he has become the artistic director of Dawn Functions, Ltd., a major Nigerian firm in Enugu. He paints at night and on weekends because of his full-time employment as the Artistic Director, and travels annually to the United States.

Adenaike occasionally works with oils and acrylics but his preferred medium is watercolor, into which he incorporates numerous uli and akika designs; more recently, he has begun adding nsibidi motifs to his paintings. His designs are complex, and tend to be based on personal themes; much of his work is topical and deeply personal. Human faces, distorted or in agony, often appear in his work. Many of his paintings also draw themes from his Yoruba childhood. He creates works that explore Igbo and Nsukka styles with uncommon insight.

As a painter, Adenaike has said that he views himself as a third generation painter, a successor to fellow Nsukka artists Uche Okeke and Chike Aniakor in the first generation and his teacher Obiora Udechukwu in the second generation.

- The Nsukka group is the name that was given to a group of Nigerian artists who were associated with the University of Nigeria, Nsukka in the 1970s. They are especially known, as a group that was working to revive the practice of uli (the traditional designs drawn by the Igbo people of Nigeria) and they incorporated its designs into contemporary art using media such as acrylic paint, tempera, gouache, pen and ink, pastel, oil paint, and watercolor.
- Tayo Adenaike has held eighteen solo exhibitions and participated in many joint and group exhibitions in Nigeria, United States, England and Germany.
