= The Only Son =

Only Son or The Only Son may refer to:

- A male who is the only child or son of a father
- The Only Son (novel), a 1966 novel by Nigerian novelist John Munonye
- The Only Son (1914 film), directed by Oscar Apfel
- The Only Son (1936 film), directed by Yasujiro Ozu
- The Only Son (2016 film), a Ugandan film
- Only Son (musician), former member of The Moldy Peaches and now a solo artist
- "Only Son", song by Liz Phair from the album whitechocolatespaceegg
