= Josy Ajiboye =

Nigerian artist & cartoonist (born 1948)

- Born: 1948 (age 77–78)
- Education: Yaba College of Technology
- Employer: Daily Times of Nigeria

Josiah Akanbi "Josy" Ajiboye (born 1948) is a Nigerian painter, illustrator, graphic designer and sociopolitical cartoonist who worked at the Daily Times. He was a cartoonist at the Daily Times newspaper from 1971 to 2000, and his favourite artistic medium was using realism to comment on cultural, political and social issues in Nigeria. His weekly cartoon column "Josy Ajiboye on Sunday" was a popular visual form of entertainment during the military era in the country. Ajiboye is regarded among cartoon scholars as the longest serving Nigerian cartoonist and the one who brought the craft to the level of art in the country.

Ajiboye hails from Erinmope, Ekiti State, Nigeria. He was educated at Yaba College of Technology and was taught by some prominent artists such as Yusuf Grillo and Solomon Wangboje. After his secondary education, he worked as a trainee for African Challenge Magazine, a division of the Sudan Interior Mission. He started work as a cartoonist with the Morning Post. In 1971, he joined Daily Times' Art Department. Ajiboye is also a painter and had his first exhibition in 1977 at the Gong Gallery, Lagos Island. He had a solo exhibition at Terra Kulture in 2011. All members of Ajiboye's family ( his wife and four children) are all professional artists.

== Sources ==
- Jimoh, Ganiyu Akinloye (2010). The Role of Editorial Cartoons in the Democratisation Process in Nigeria: A Study of Selected Works of Three Nigerian Cartoonists. Boca Raton, FL: Dissertation.com. ISBN 9781612337746.
- Jimoh, Ganiyu (2018). "Josy Ajiboye: The Reluctant Cartoonist and Social Commentaries in Postcolonial Nigeria". International Journal of Comic Art. 20 (1): 242–254.
- Kola-Bankole, Francine (2020). "Josy Ajiboye, the Ultimate Prankster: Political Cartoonist as Egungun". African Arts. 53 (1): 24–37. doi:10.1162/afar_a_00512.
- Medubi, Oyin (2009). "Cartooning in Nigeria: Large Canvas, Little Movement". In Lent, John A. (ed.). Cartooning in Africa. Cresskill: Hampton Press. pp. 197–218.
