= Obi (novel) =

1969 novel by John Munonye

- Author: John Munonye
- Language: English
- Series: African Writers Series
- Release number: 45
- Genre: Literary fiction
- Publisher: Heinemann
- Publication date: 1969
- Publication place: Nigeria
- Media type: Print

Obi is a novel written by Nigerian novelist John Munonye. The first edition was published in 1969. It is forty-fifth instalment of the Heinemann African Writers Series.
