= Sylvia Williams =

American art historian (1936–1996)

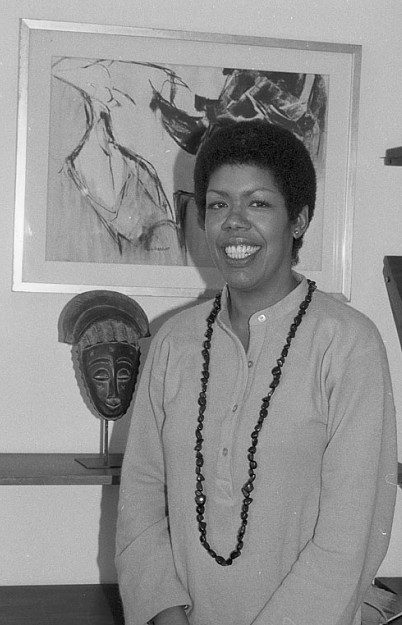
- Williams stands in front of two objects from the collection of the National Museum of African Art
- Born: Sylvia Louise Hill; February 10, 1936; Lincoln, Pennsylvania, U.S.
- Died: February 28, 1996 (aged 60); Washington, DC, U.S.
- Education: Oberlin College, New York University Institute of Fine Arts
- Occupations: Museum director, curator, art historian, and scholar of African art
- Spouse: Charlton Williams

Sylvia H. Williams (née Sylvia Louise Hill; February 10, 1936 – February 28, 1996), was an American museum director, curator, art historian, and scholar of African art. She helped develop the study and appreciation of African art as a significant aesthetic and intellectual pursuit in the United States.

== Life and work ==
Williams was born and grew up in Lincoln, Pennsylvania. Her father was a professor of English and dean at Lincoln University. She married Charlton Williams, and the couple never had children. Williams held art history degrees from Oberlin College in 1957 and New York University's Institute of Fine Arts in 1975. Williams served as a curator in the Department of African, Oceanic and New World Cultures at the Brooklyn Museum in 1973.

In February 1983, Williams joined the National Museum of African Art at the Smithsonian Institution and in 1987 oversaw the move of the museum to its current location at the National Mall in Washington, D.C. During her time at this museum, she was dedicated to elevating the museum's reputation, whereby she helped the museum acquire more than 845 works of both traditional and modern African art for exhibition, including sculpture, photography, and textiles. She emphasized the importance of connoisseurship in the appreciation and display of African art.

In 1983, Williams received a Candace Award for History from the National Coalition of 100 Black Women. In 1989, she was awarded an honorary Doctor of Humane Letters by Amherst College, and the following year (1990), she received an honorary Doctor of Fine Arts by Oberlin College.

She served as president of the Association of Art Museum Directors (AAMD) from 1994 to 1995.

She died in Washington, D.C., at age 60 from complications with a brain aneurysm. In October 1997, the National Museum of African Art of the Smithsonian Institution launched the exhibition The Poetics of the Line: Seven Artists of the Nsukka group, which was also the inaugural exhibition of the Sylvia H. Williams Gallery named in her honor.

== Exhibitions ==
- 1973: African Art of the Dogon
- 1976: Black South Africa, Contemporary Graphics
- 1981: African Furniture and Household Objects
- 1981: Art of the Archaic Indonesians
- 1989: Icons, Ideals and Power in the Art of Africa
- 1991: The Art of the Personal Object (aesthetic value of utilitarian objects in African cultures)
- 1993: Astonishment and Power: the Eyes of Understanding Kongo Minkisi

== Publications ==
- 1974: "Contemporary Graphics"; an essay for African Art as Philosophy
- 1976: Black South Africa

== See also ==
- Women in the art history field
