= Ada Udechukwu =

Nigerian artist and poet

- Born: 1960 (age 65–66); Enugu
- Education: University of Nigeria
- Known for: Painting, writing, Poet

Ada Udechukwu (born 1960) is a Nigerian artist and poet associated with the Nsukka group.

== Biography ==
Born in the city of Enugu, southeastern part of Nigeria, Udechukwu is the daughter of an Igbo father and an American mother.

When the Eastern part of Nigeria attempted to break out of Nigeria to form what was called the Republic of Biafra, this led to a civil war in Nigeria which was generally called the Biafran war of 1967–70. Due to the war, she and her siblings took refuge in Michigan USA with their mother while their father stayed back in Nigeria. They remained in Michigan until 1971, a year after the end of the Biafran War. She studied under the author Chinua Achebe, earning her bachelor's degree in English and literature at the University of Nigeria, Nsukka. She began to paint on fabric, painting designs on clothing using a restrained linear style. In 1988, she began to make drawings on paper, using ink and watercolor. These drawings are more personal than her other work, reflecting her attempts to balance being a woman and an artist. Her work also examines the complexities of multicultural and intercultural identities, inside and outside Africa. Her work is in the collection of The Newark Museum of Art. Udechukwu is one of the few women artists associated with the Nsukka group

In 1997, at the height of Nigeria's military dictatorship, her husband, the artist Obiora Udechukwu, accepted a teaching position at St. Lawrence University in upstate New York. Together with their daughter, Ijeanuli, and son, Nwora, the couple left Nigeria for America, where they have been living ever since.

As a writer, Ada Udechukwu is primarily a poet. She is also a well-regarded short story writer. Her book of poems and drawings, Woman, Me, was published by Boomerang Press (1993). Her short story "Night Bus" was published in the Fiction Issue of the journal The Atlantic (August 2006). She also published a children's book, Herero, in 1995.
