= John Munonye =

Nigerian writer

John Munonye (April 1929 – 10 May 1999) was an Igbo writer and one of the most renowned Nigerian writers of the 20th century.

== Biography ==
John Munonye was born in Akokwa, Nigeria, and was educated at Christ the King College, Onitsha (1943–48), the University of Ibadan (graduating in 1952) and the Institute of Education, London. His first novel, The Only Son, was published in Heinemann's African Writers Series in 1966, followed in 1969 by its sequel, Obi, and then Oil Man of Obange (1971). Munonye spent three years as the head of the Advanced Teacher Training College, Owerri, retiring in 1972 (he would also give his last public lecture there, entitled "The Last To Go"). He worked for the Nigerian Ministry of Education until 1977, leaving to teach and devote more time to writing. His other novels were A Wreath for the Maidens (1973), A Dancer of Fortune (1974), and Bridge to a Wedding (1978), after which he published little.

== Criticism and style ==
Munonye, unlike some of his contemporaries, professed a love for optimism in the face of colonial onslaught on traditional values. To him, the dialectical environment of African and western tradition can be seen in both a positive light and outcome for the common Igbo or Nigerian man or woman. An overriding theme in his novels is the focus on the common man. Munonye sometimes view the common man as being born into a position whereby he is already at a disadvantage, both historically and presently, He sees little difference to the fate of the common man who could be manipulated at the whims of elites and chiefs in both pre- and post-colonial Nigeria and during colonialism.

== Works ==
- The Only Son: Heinemann (African Writers Series, 21), 1966. ISBN 978-0435900212
- Obi, Ibadan: Heinemann (African Writers Series, 45), 1969. ISBN 978-0435900458
- Oil Man of Obange: Heinemann (African Writers Series, 94), 1971. ISBN 978-0435900946
- A Wreath for the Maidens: Heinemann (African Writers Series, 121), 1973. ISBN 978-0435901219
- A Dancer of Fortune: Heinemann (African Writers Series, 153), 1974. ISBN 978-0435901530
- Bridge to a Wedding: Heinemann (African Writers Series, 195), 1978. ISBN 978-0435901950
