= Rosemary Uwemedimo =

Nigerian writer

Rosemary Uwemedimo is a Nigerian writer of children's fiction of English origin.

== Biography ==
Uwemedimo was born Rosemary Howard.

She married a Nigerian barrister in the 1950s, the couple had at least one child.

== Works ==
- Mammy-Wagon Marriage (1961)
- Akpan and the Smugglers (1971)
