= Obiora Udechukwu =

Nigerian painter and poet (born 1946)

- Born: 1946 (age 79–80); Onitsha, Nigeria
- Education: University of Nigeria
- Occupation: Painter

Obiora Udechukwu (born 1946) is a Nigerian painter and poet.

== Biography ==
Obiora Udechukwu was born June 4, 1946, in Onitsha in 1946 to parents from Agulu in Anambra State, southeastern region of Nigeria. Agulu is where he first encountered uli murals at family compounds and shrines. His work was shaped by his experiences during the 1967 to 1970 Biafra war. He received his early education in an Anglophone colonial system, including art training in both primary and secondary school. He studied for one year at Ahmadu Bello University before transferring to the University of Nigeria, Nsukka as a result of pogroms against the Igbo people in northern Nigeria. During the Nigerian Civil War, also known as the Biafran War (1967–1970), Udechukwu worked in the Propaganda Unit, and participated in the artists and writers workshops led by the poet Gabriel Okara and the artist Uche Okeke.

At the end of the war, he returned to Nsukka, completing his bachelor's degree in fine arts, with a thesis on Igbo Uli mural art, in 1972. In 1973, he was appointed a Junior Fellow in the Department of Fine Arts, where he received his Master of Fine Arts in 1977. He is recognized as a leading member of the Nsukka School, originally led by Uche Okeke who served as head of the art program until 1985. While at Nsukka, Udechukwu became a founding member of the Aka Circle of Exhibiting Artists, which included El Anatsui, Tayo Adenaike, and other artists based in eastern Nigeria. He served on the editorial board of Okike: African Journal of New Writing established in Nsukka by the novelist Chinua Achebe. He was appointed Professor of Painting at Nsukka in 1986. During his tenure, his students included Tayo Adenaike, Olu Oguibe, Chika Okeke-Agulu, Marcia Kure, and Sylvester Okwunodu Ogbechie. In 1997, Udechukwu became Dana Professor of Fine Arts at St. Lawrence University, in New York State. He retired in 2018 and lives in Carson, CA.

In the mid 1970s, Udechukwu began what was to be more than a decade-long process of studying uli designs and experimenting in the method of Natural Synthesis, which had been defined by Uche Okeke at beginning of the previous decade. Okeke, who came to Nsukka from Zaria in 1970, proposed Natural Synthesis as a theory of merging indigenous art traditions with western traditions to create a new, modern art form. In this search for a new post-independence aesthetic, Okeke sought to translate uli – a mural and body decoration art of the Igbo – into a contemporary artistic idiom. In the late 1970s, Udechukwu also began to incorporate nsibidi into his art. This design system originated east of the Igbo with the Ejagham, but it later spread to the southeast of Igboland. A system of motifs associated with male secret societies called Ekpe, which survive to this day, nsibidi can be used to send messages.

Many of Udechukwu's paintings and prints depict ordinary people; his wartime service also inspired pieces that depicted the great suffering that he witnessed. From the mid-1970s, his artistic themes ranged from philosophical subjects to socio-political commentary.

== Artworks ==
=== Early work ===
Early in Udechukwu's career, he studied conventional drawing at Ahmadu Bello University in Zaria before transferring to the University of Nigeria, Nsukka. Around this time, anti-Igbo massacres were taking place in northern Nigeria. This would influence his artworks heavily. During his time in Nsukka, he depicted these experiences in his art, for instance showing the Igbo people in scenes of distress, or in conditions of death, despair, and fear.

For instance, Silent Faces at the Crossroads (1967) depicts a large group of figures, possibly representing many Igbo people fleeing their home as a result of the attacks on their people. The majority are partially unclothed, covered in blue cloths with tints of white. Those towards the background are shrouded in a darker shade of blue, barely visible, as they fade into a dark silhouette. Many of the figures' faces are partially articulated, but their features are not well-defined, with the faces lacking eyes. They look very much in despair. Along the left edge of the painting, the ground that they walk upon radiates in a strong red hue, while a lone child-like figure walks on it. The use of primary colors (mostly red, blues, yellows, and at times oranges) is common in Udechukwu's work, and is evident in many different examples, such as Tycoons and Stevedores (1980), Refugees (1977), The Moon Has Ascended Between Us (1976), Musician (1975–76), and more. Overall, these early works capture the somber, yet intense emotions in the moments of great tragedy experienced by the Igbo ethnic group during this time, as well as Udechukwu himself, with himself fleeing one violent crisis, only to find himself caught within another one.

=== Uli Style ===
In 1966, because of the anti-Igbo pogroms, Obiora Udechukwu fled and enrolled at University of Nigeria, Nsukka. At the beginning of his tenure there, the Biafran War (1967–1970) broke out. He served in the military while still creating art. After the three-year-war ended, he resumed his studies. By this time, he had become acquainted with Uche Okeke. Together they studied uli, a southeast Nigerian tradition involving female body and wall painting. Uli emphasized forms obtained from nature created by linear patterns, curves and dynamic linework. Udechukwu had previously worked with uli briefly in 1966, but he began to fully study it in 1972. Udechukwu, along with Okeke and others, began working on a new form of contemporary art that revived the style not just for use in cultural traditions, but as a practice that informed creative individual expression. This new form of art served to further social commentary, political critique, and social realism in contemporary Nigerian art.

One of Udechukwu's most notable works from this period is Road to Abuja (1982), which depicts the rich and poor journeying towards Abuja. This city was not yet the capital of Nigeria, at the time, but a slow, planned shift from Lagos, the former capital city, was being facilitated. The rich are depicted clearly in the very front of the picture, holding symbols of wealth such as watches and briefcases, which also double as symbols of bribery and corruption. Meanwhile the poor are grouped together in the background; they are depicted as vendors. Different variations of curved and angled lines make up each and every figure in the piece. Other notable works included No Water (1980), Song of Sorrow (1989), and Tycoon and Stevedores (1979), an earlier version of the oil painting of the same name that was created a year later.

=== Other works ===
Obiora Udechukwu also began to use Nsibidi in his art. Nsibidi is another form of indigenous pictographic motif, which is used to represent or express characteristics of the human relationships, such as love, marriage, and divorce. Nsibidi is associated with secret male societies and can be found on various different things, such as cloths and artifacts. It also carries hidden meanings. Examples of Nsibidi in Udechukwu's work can be found in People of the Night (1985) and Ndidi: The Patient Person (1985).

== Exhibition history ==
Udechukwu has had more than 25 one-person exhibitions in Nigeria, England, Zimbabwe, Germany, and United States.

== Public collections ==
His art work is in the collections of National Gallery of Modern Art, Lagos; National Council of Arts and Culture, Lagos; Centre for Cultural Studies, University of Lagos; Iwalewa-Haus, University of Bayreuth, Germany; Museum fur Volkderkunde, Frankfurt/Main, Germany; Bradford City Museums and Galleries, Bradford, England; Smithsonian National Museum of African Art, Washington, DC; Newark Museum of Art.

== Poetry ==
- What the Madman Said, (1990), winner of Association of Nigerian Authors Poetry Prize, 1990.
