= Uche Okeke =

Nigerian artist (1933–2016)

- Born: 30 April 1933; Nimo, Nigeria
- Died: 5 January 2016 (aged 82); Nimo, Nigeria
- Education: Ahmadu Bello University in Zaria, Nigeria
- Occupations: Visual artist, professor
- Parent(s): Isaac Okonkwo Okeke (father), Monica Mgboye Okeke (née Okoye) (mother)

Christopher Uchefuna Okeke (April 30, 1933 – January 5, 2016), also known as Uche Okeke, was an illustrator, painter, sculptor, and teacher. He was an art and aesthetic theorist, seminal to Nigerian modernism.

== Background ==
Christopher Uchefuna Okeke was born on 30 April 1933 in Nimo, Njikoka Local Government Area of Anambra State, located in the southeastern region of Nigeria, to Isaac Okonkwo Okeke and Monica Mgboye Okeke (née Okoye). Between 1940 and 1953, he attended St. Peter Claver's (Primary) School, Kafanchan, Metropolitan College, Onitsha, and Bishop Shanahan College, Orlu, Nigeria, during which time he had already begun to demonstrate an avid interest in drawing and painting. Before being admitted to read Fine Art at Nigerian College of Arts, Science and Technology (NCAST), now Ahmadu Bello University, Zaria, Okeke had already exhibited taxidermy work during the Field Society meeting in Jos Museum, participated in the preparation and presentation of Nigerian Drawings and Paintings with Bernard Fagg as curator and had a solo exhibition of drawings and paintings, in Jos and Kaduna with Sir Ahmadu Bello in attendance.

== Zaria Art Society ==
As a young artist, Okeke was a founding member of the Zaria Art Society in 1958. The group was a result of political conflict in Nigeria struggling to gain independence and was founded by important protagonists of modernism in Nigerian Art like Yusuf Grillo, Bruce Onobrakpeya, Oseloka Osadebe, Demas Nwoko and others. Most of his professors at the Nigerian College were British and taught western style techniques however, The Zaria Society opposed the imposition of European art school ideas on young artists in Africa. In school, Okeke studied the Igbo, Yoruba, and Hausa ethnic groups, looking for a way to express his Nigerian self. Ancient Nigerian symbols are most commonly found on pottery or in body paintings. Igbo designs are called Uli Patterns.

=== Nsukka ===
In 1971, Uche Okeke joined the Department of Fine and Applied Arts at the University of Nigeria in Nsukka as a professor. Together with colleagues and students he developed a unique style which became characteristic for the called "Nsukka School". With Chike Aniakor and Obiora Udechukwu he established the formation of art and aesthetics of Nigerian modernism in the seventies.

=== Igbo Culture and Design ===
Okeke was first exposed to Igbo folktales as a child and later used them as inspiration in his art. In some of his drawings, the artist rendered the heroic mythological figures to bring attention to his Igbo heritage.

The Igbo culture area is east of the Niger River, west of the Cross River, and West of the Great Niger waterway of southeastern Nigeria. Throughout this area there is evidence of an ancient artistic culture. The traditional Igbo art form is called Uli Drawing. According to Okeke, Uli is an attempt to enhance the beauty of the human body. Traditionally, a Uli artist is a female person in Igbo society who paints patterns on the body and sometimes on the walls of sacred places. This process is called Ide Uli or Ise Uli. The motifs and symbols in Uli usually remain consistent however, it is the ordering of the design elements that challenge the ingenuity of traditional Igbo artists.

Many of the design elements in Uli are derived from nature. Striped and spotted beings like pythons and jaguars are examples of the sources the patterns come from. Uli patterns have geometric, plant, and animal motifs. Additionally, the color choices the artist makes have significance. Okeke explains how colors are used and where they come from. The medium in Uli Drawings are extracted from the pods of plants. Uli Oba, Uli Nkilisi, and Uli Ede Eji are names of the plants from which the medium is extracted.

Art in ‘Igboland’ is attributed to the earth goddess Ala. Art springs from mother nature and is seen as a means of fostering the spiritual and physical well being of kindred communities. It represents the life of the people and the bare bones of creativity. Uli also has certain lyrical qualities which are inspired by songs in Igbo folklore.

=== Art and aesthetic ===
Okeke was influenced by his mother, who created Uli (design) designs, and believed that drawing and line-work were fundamental to his career as an artist. This practice can be noted in his work titled Savannah Landscape.

Ana Mmuo (Land of the Dead), 1961

Uche Okeke's artistic productivity was backed by several aesthetic considerations coming along with his artistic projects. His early writings seize on the ideas of Pan-Africanism and Négritude. Among others it was the compelling style of his essays that earned the group of young students at the Ahmadu Bello University the title "Zaria rebels". In his later reflections he focused on the political role artists should cultivate.

=== University Administrator and The Asele Institute ===
He also opened a cultural centre at 30 Ibadan Street, Kafanchan, which later became the Asele Institute, Nimo, where among other cultural activities a part of the Smithsonian Institution-sponsored educational film Nigerian Art - Kindred Spirits was shot in 1996. The institute contains a collection of artifacts, objects, and artwork from friends Okeke acquired during his travels to different parts of Nigeria. It remains one of the most important repositories of documents, artifacts, and mid-20th century African art.

Uche was appointed lecturer and acting head of Fine Arts Department at the University of Nigeria, Nsukka, from 1971 to 1985. He transformed their curriculum to have more of a focus on African indigenous art and design which he believed would benefit the development of modern and contemporary African Art. In 1973, he also redesigned the curriculum of the Department of Fine and Applied Arts, Institute of Management and Technology, Enugu, and initiated postgraduate courses in the Department of Fine Arts, University of Nigeria, Nsukka.

He was the director of the Institute of African Studies at the University of Nigeria in Nsukka, a visiting professor to the Department of Creative Arts, University of Port Harcourt, Honorary Deputy Director-General (Africa) of International Biographical Centre, Cambridge, among numerous other engagements with many educational and cultural institutions.

That Okeke carried the Uli experiment beyond the walls of Zaria and stood in the forefront of its transformation into a modern idiom in the 1970s, from the studios at Nsukka was original. He is a leading figure in the history of modern African Art.

== Professional career ==
In 1958, he became the founder and Director of Asele Institute and Documentation Center, Nimo, Nigeria.

1986–2006 Visiting professor and external examiner, University of Port Harcourt, Rivers State, Ahmadu Bello University, Zaria. Obafemi Awolowo University (formerly University of Ife).

Federal Polytechnic, Oko. Imo State University, Owerri, Nigeria.

1970–85 University of Nigeria, Nsukka, Nigeria. Positions held; Acting Head of Department, Fine and Applied Arts Department Dean Faculty of Arts Director, Institute of African Studies.

1981–82 Honorary Fellow, Department of Textile and Clothing Design, and Art History, University of Minnesota, USA (one-year sabbatical leave).

1968 Refugee Affairs Committee, Aba, Nigeria.

1964–67 Director, Mbari Art Centre, Uwani, Enugu, Nigeria.

1964–66 Artistic Director and Designer, Enugu Musical Society, Enugu, Nigeria.

1961–62 Freelance artist and Director, Cultural Centre, Kafanchan, Nigeria.

1961 Publications Artist, Federal Ministry of Information, Lagos.

1959 Founder/Director, Cultural Centre Kafanchan (now Asele Institute Nimo), Nigeria.

1958-61 Founder/First Secretary/Second President, Art Society, Nigerian College of Arts Science and Technology, Zaria, Nigeria.

1955–57 Clerk, Department of Labour, Jos and Lagos, Nigeria.

1956 Organising Assistant, Exhibition of Nigerian Painting and Drawing, Jos Museum, Jos, Nigeria.

1954–55 Designer, visual aids, St. Peter Claver's Catholic and College of Mary Immaculate Heart Practicing Schools, Kafanchan, Nigeria.

=== Solo exhibitions ===
- 2006 Another Modernity: Works on Paper by Uche Okeke, Newark Museum, Newark, New Jersey, USA.
- 2003 Retrospective solo exhibition, Pendulum Gallery, Lagos, Nigeria
- 1982 Contemporary Nigerian Prints, Drawings and Paintings: Uche Okeke. Katherine E. Nash Gallery, University of Minneapolis, Twin Cities, Minnesota, USA.
  - Homage to Asele, Exhibition of Prints, Drawings and Paintings: Uche Okeke, African American Cultural Centre, Minneapolis, Minnesota, USA.
- 1979 Retrospective Exhibition of Drawings and Prints, German Cultural Centre, Lagos, Nigeria.
- 1978 Graphik Aus Nigeria, Germany.
- 1963 Exhibition of Mosaics and stained glass window, Franz Mayer and Company, Munich, Germany.
- 1962 Exhibition of drawings, Rott am Inn, Germany.

=== Group exhibitions ===
- 2010 Nigerian 50th Independence Exhibition, Abuja, Nigeria.
  - Afro Modern: Journeys through the Black Atlantic, Tate Modern, Liverpool.
  - NIVATOUR, Group Exhibition by the National Gallery of Art, Abuja, Alexandria and Cairo, Egypt.
- 2009 Society of Nigerian Artists Anniversary Exhibition, Omenka Gallery, Lagos, Nigeria.
  - Group Exhibition in honour of Chinua Achebe and the 50th anniversary of Things Fall Apart.
- 2008 ARESUVA, National Gallery of Art, Abuja, Nigeria.
- 2006 Another Modernity: Works on paper by Uche Okeke, The Newark Museum of Art, Newark, New Jersey, USA.
- 1997 Poetics of Line: Seven Artists of the Nsukka Group, National Museum of African Art, Smithsonian Institution, Washington, DC, USA.
- 1995 Seven Stories about Modern Art in Africa, Whitechapel Art Gallery, London.
- 1977 Exhibition of African Contemporary Art, Howard University, Department of Art, College of Fine Arts, Washington D.C. USA.
  - Exhibition of Nigerian Contemporary Art (FESTAC), National Council for Arts and Culture, Lagos.
- 1976 Joint Exhibition of prints and textiles, Department of Human Environment and Design/African Studies Centre, Kresge Gallery, Michigan State University, East Lansing, Michigan USA.
- 1972 Group Exhibition, Nasprstek Museum, Prague, Czechoslovakia.
- 1969 Kunst aus Biafra, Cologne, Düsseldorf, Bonn, Trier, Dortmund, Essen and Munich, Germany.
- 1966 World Festival of Negro Arts Exhibition, Dakar, Senegal
- 1967 Drei Kreuzwege – Drei Kontinente, with Hansen Bahia (Germany) and Vivial Ellis (USA), Munich, Germany.
- 1964 Group Exhibition, Harmon Foundation Inc., New York, USA.
- 1963/64 Three-man show with Ibrahim el-Salahi (Sudan) and Valente Malagantana (Mozambique), Committee for Cultural Freedom, India and Pakistan.
- 1962 Group Exhibition, Rhodes National Gallery, Salisbury, Rhodesia.
  - Gallery Lambert, Paris, France.
  - Ugandan Independence Art Exhibition, Kampala.

=== Commissioned work ===
- 2015 OIS Services passport and Visa Centre, Johannesburg, South Africa.
- 1989 Oko Cross, St. John's Anglican Church, Oko, Anambra State.
  - Portraits of Father Iwene Tansi, commissioned by the Holy Trinity Cathedral, Onitsha, Anambra State
- 1976 Park and fountain designs for the Open Spaces Development Commission, Anambra State.
- 1975 Fourteen Stations of the Cross, St Peter's Catholic Church chapel, University of Nigeria Nsukka.
- 1971–74 Designed Archbishop's Throne and portals, Holy Trinity Cathedral, Onitsha, Anambra State.
- 1971 Designed and produced carved wooden doors for Holy Trinity Cathedral, Onitsha, Anambra State.
- 1967 Stage design for television serial, Heritage, ENTV production.
- 1966 EDI Sculpture, Enugu Campus, University of Nigeria, Nsukka.
  - Film titles design, Eastern Nigeria Information Service's Film Division, Enugu, Nigeria.
  - Sketch designs for the wrought-metal screen wall, Anglican Church chapel, University of Nigeria, Nsukka.
  - Designed robes for the Presbyterian Church Choir, Uwani, Enugu.
- 1965 Illustrated Chinua Achebe's Things Fall Apart
  - Designed book jacket and cover for John Munonye's The Only Son
- 1964 Designed Boys Scouts of Nigeria Badges
  - Designed Oil Murals and Paintings for the Eastern Nigeria Central Library, Children's Section. Theme: Animals in Procession.
- 1962–63 Three murals in mosaic and stained glass for Franz Meyer and Company, Munich, Germany.
- 1961 Mural for the Mbari Artists and Writers Club House and Gallery, Ibadan, Nigeria.
- 1960 Mother Nigeria and Her Children, mural for Independence Exhibition, Victoria Island, Lagos, Nigeria.

== Accolades ==
- 2009 Federal Government Award for distinguished service in the Arts and Culture Sector.
- 2001 Presidential award of MFR by the President of the Federal Republic of Nigeria.
- 1977 Prize for Terra Cotta Sculpture titled Dance of Unity, Murtala Mohammed International Sculpture competition, Lagos.
- 1973 British Council Bursary Award
- 1972 Illustrator of the Year 1972, for Tales of Land of Death, Igbo Folk Tales, published by Doubleday, New York, awarded by National UNESCO Commission's Book of the Year competition.
- 1971 Drama award by the African Studies Centre, University of California, USA.
- 1962–63 Fellowship award to study mosaic and stained-glass window techniques awarded by the West German government.
- 1960 Poetry prize in a national literary competition organized by the National Arts Council.
- 1959 First place Esso Inc., Nigerian Independence calendar design competition, Lagos.
- 1958–61 Nigerian Federal Government Scholarship
- 1957 Out-of-doors painting award by the Head of Department of Fine Art, NCAST, Zaria.

== Honors, distinctions, and memberships ==
- 1987 Member, Adjudication Panel, Biennale of Children's Book Illustration, Bratislava, Czechoslovakia.
- 1985 Member, Nigerian Delegation to UNESCO General Conference, Sophia, Bulgaria
- 1984 Delegate, International Artists’ Congress, Helsinki, Finland.
- 1983 Member, Nigerian Delegation to UNESCO General Conference, Paris, France.
- 1981 UNESCO Delegate to the 24th General Conference, Belgrade, Yugoslavia.
- 1979 Children's Books on Africa and their Authors, an annotated bibliography – Nancy J. Schmidt. New York and London: Africana Publishing Company.
- 1978 Member of Editorial Board, Black Orpheus, University of Lagos.
- 1978 Chairman of the Cultural Sector, UNESCO Commission, Lagos.
- 1977 Africa Yearbook and Who's Who *1977, London, Africa Journal Ltd.
- 1977 International Directory of Scholars and Specialists in African Studies, 1st edition, Waltham, Massachusetts, USA: Brandels University African Studies Association.
- 1976–77 Member, Visual Arts Committee, FESTAC '77, Lagos.
- 1976–77 Member of International Association of Artists (IIA), Paris, France.
- 1976–77 Vice-President Society for Nigerian Artists.
- 1976 Associate member, the Nigerian Art Education Association (NAEA), Reston, Virginia, USA.
- 1976 Member of Nigerian Society for Education Through Art (NSEA) Lagos.
- 1975 Member, International Society of Education Through Art (INSEA), Hereford, England.
- 1974 International Directory of Arts, 12th edition, Verlag Muller GMBH and Company K.G. Frankfurt/Main, Germany.
- 1974 American Council on Education Lecture Tour to 8 American Universities in the USA.
- 1971 Member review panel W.A.E.C. Art Syllabus.
- 1971 Iskusstuo Stran I Narodov Mira Vol.3 Soviet Arts Encyclopedia, Moscow, USSR.
- 1971–78 Member of Advisory Committee, Institute of African Studies, University of Nigeria, Nsukka.
- 1971–76 Member of East Central State Arts Council and Chief Art Organiser for the State Festival of Arts.
- 1970 Member of International Bibliophile Association, Paris, France.

== Papers and publications ==
- 2010 Nigeria @ 50, a publication by the Federal Government of Nigeria in commemoration of the 50th Anniversary of Nigeria's independence.
- 2003 NKU DI NA MBA: Uche Okeke and Modern Nigerian Art, National Gallery of Art, Lagos.
  - The Triumph of a Vision: an Anthology on Uche Okeke and Modern Art in Nigeria, Pendulum Art Gallery.
- 1998 The Zaria Art Society: A New Consciousness, National Gallery of Art, Lagos.
- 1995 Seven Stories about Modern Art in Africa, Whitechapel Art Gallery, London
- 1991 Terms of Art: Contemporary Nigerian Art in the International Context, Ministry of Culture, Nordrhine-Westfalen/Kunstsammilung Nordrhine-Westfalen, Düsseldorf, Germany.
- 1990 Eze Institution in Igboland, by Hanny Hahn-Waanders, Asele Institute Documentation Centre, Nimo, Anambra State.
- 1982 Art in Development: A Nigerian Perspective, Asele Institute Documentation Centre and the African American Cultural Center, Minneapolis, US.
- 1976 "Search for the Theoretical Basis of Contemporary Art", paper presented at the International Symposium on Contemporary Art, University of Nigeria, Nsukka.
  - Modern Nigerian Art, Documentation Centre, Asele Institute, Nimo.
  - Igbo Art, Asele Institute, Nimo.
- 1971 Tales of Land of Death: Igbo folktales by Uche Okeke, Doubleday, Zenith Books.
- 1969 Geschichte der Ibo Kunst, Dortmund Lecture No. 97, Dortmund: Kulturamt der Stadt Dortmund.
- 1961 Drawings by Uche Okeke, intro. Ulli Beier, Ibadan. Mbari Productions.

== Death ==
Okeke died on 5 January 2016 in his native home at Nimo at the age of 82.

In 2024 his work was featured in The Venice Biennale (La Biennale Di Venezia) for the first time.
