= Bruce Onobrakpeya =

Nigerian printmaker, painter and sculptor (born 1932)

Bruce Onobrakpeya NNOM
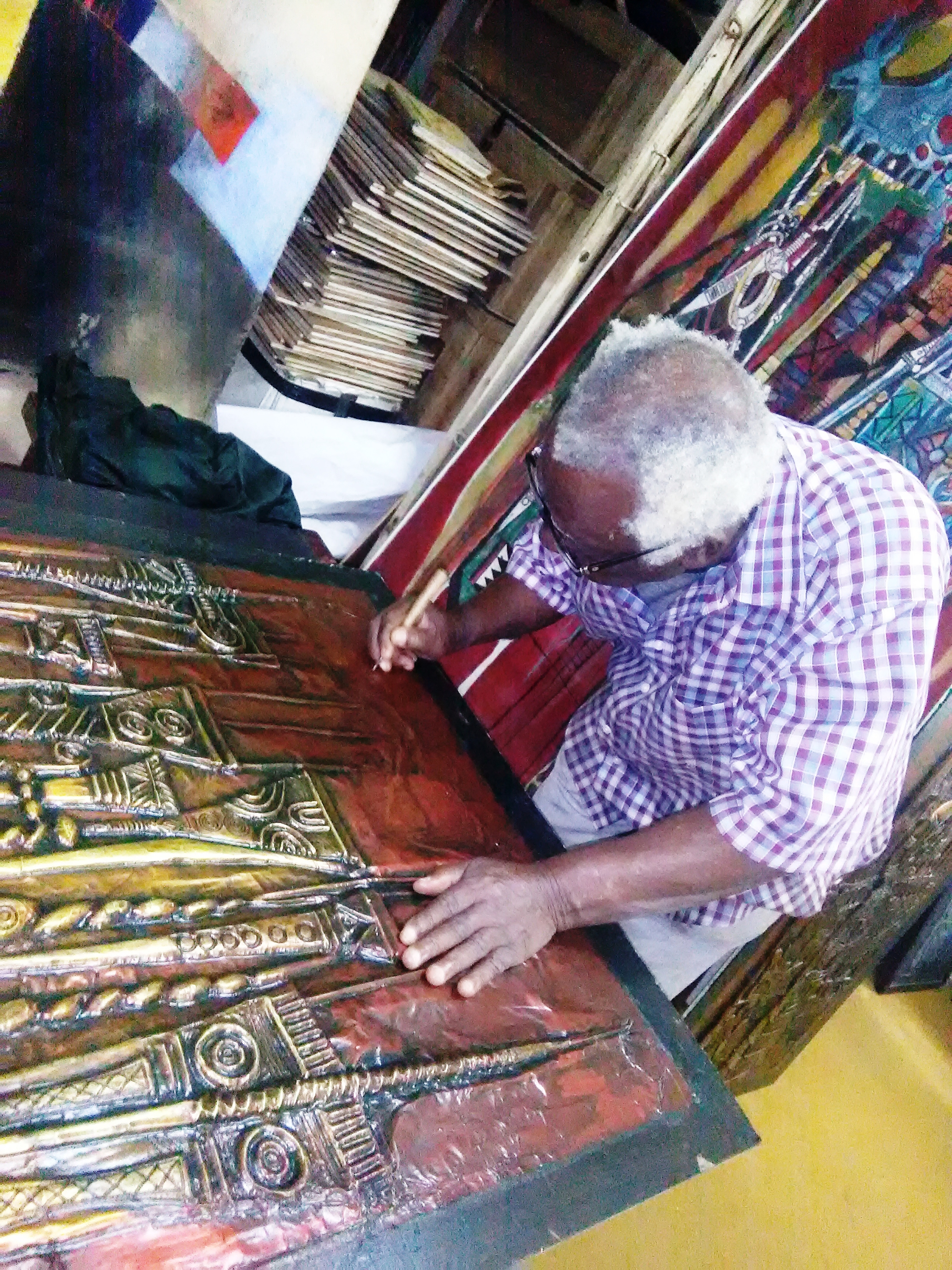
- Onobrakpeya signing one of his art pieces Emetore, in his Ovuomaroro Studio
- Born: Bruce Obomeyoma Onobrakpeya; 30 August 1932 (age 94); Agbara-Otor, Delta State, Nigeria
- Education: Ahmadu Bello University, Zaria
- Occupations: Printmaker, painter and sculptor
- Movement: Modern Nigerian art and The Harmattan Workshop Group
- Awards: 2006 Human Living Treasure Award by UNESCO

Bruce Obomeyoma Onobrakpeya (born 30 August 1932) is a Nigerian printmaker, painter and sculptor. He has exhibited at the Tate Modern in London, the National Museum of African Art of the Smithsonian Institution in Washington, D.C., and the Malmö Konsthall in Malmö, Sweden. The National Gallery of Modern Art, Lagos, has an exhibit of colourful abstract canvases by Onobrakpeya, and his works were found at the Virtual Museum of Modern Nigerian Art.

== Early years ==
Bruce Onobrakpeya was born in Agbarha-Otor in Delta State, the son of an Urhobo carver. He was raised as a Christian but also learned the traditional beliefs. His family moved to Benin City, Edo State, when he was a child. He attended Western Boys High School, where he was taught art by Edward Ivehivboje. While in high school, he also attended drawing classes at the British Council Art Club in Benin City. During this time Onobrakpeya was inspired by the watercolour paintings of Emmanuel Erabor and a lecture given by Ben Enwonwu, art advisor to the Nigerian government. After leaving high school, Onobrakpeya was hired as an art teacher at the Western Boys High School (1953–56). In 1956, he left for Ondo, where he taught at the Ondo Boys High School for a year.

== Formal art education ==
In October 1957, Onobrakpeya was admitted to the Nigerian College of Arts, Science and Technology, now the Ahmadu Bello University, Zaria. Funded by a Federal Government Scholarship, he was trained in the Western tradition of representational art. At the same time, he began to experiment with forms in relation to Nigerian folklore, myths and legends. Much of his work uses stylistic elements and compositions derived from traditional African sculpture and decorative arts.

The Zaria Arts Society, a discussion group which would later be called the Zaria Rebels, was formed on 9 October 1958 by a group of art students at the college led by Uche Okeke, with the aim of "decolonizing" the visual arts as taught by expatriate Europeans. Onobrakpeya has said that the college gave him technical skills, but the Zaria Arts Society shaped his perspectives as a professional artist. The society gave him the confidence to seek a personal expressive idiom that would project a Nigerian identity. He elongated his figures, ignored perspective and evoked the supernatural through ambiguous decorations.

== Later career ==
Onobrakpeya later attended a series of printmaking workshops in Ibadan, Oshogbo, Ife and Haystack Mountain School of Crafts, Maine, US. His first one-man exhibition was held in 1959 in Ughelli in the Niger Delta. Later he exhibited in the US, Italy, Zimbabwe, Germany, Britain, Kenya and elsewhere. Onobrakpeya was an important force in the renaissance in contemporary art in Nigeria. For many years he taught at St. Gregory's College, Lagos.

Onobrakpeya created the Bruce Onobrakpeya Foundation, of which he is president, and which organises the annual Harmattan workshop in his hometown of Agbara Otor, Delta State. The foundation is an artist-led non-governmental organization, formed in 1999, which aims to encourage the growth of art and culture by giving artists opportunities to gain skills, while increasing public awareness of African art and its benefits to society. The foundation organised the Amos Tutuola Show, Lagos (2000) and has participated in many other shows.

== Recognition ==
"Bruce Onobrakpeya is amongst the most successful artists to have emerged in West Africa during the 20th century, with continuing and commanding influence on the generation of artists in Nigeria, who have come to maturity in the post colonial period." —John Picton, professor of art history and archeology, in his essay "Modernism and Modernity in African Art".

- Honorary D. Litt. from the University of Ibadan in 1989.
- Honourable mention at the Venice Biennale.
- Solidra Circle award, and Fulbright Exchange Scholar award.
- Recipient of the U.S. Exchange Alumni Lifetime Achievement Award to recognise his significant contributions to the long-existing cultural and arts relationship between the U.S. and Nigeria in 2024.

== Onobrakpeya's work ==
=== Art periods ===
The following section summarizes specific periods in the artist's studio practice, which spans more than 50 years; it is not an extensive history of his artistic career.

The first segment is the Mythical Realism (1957–62), which represents paintings, and lino cut prints that depict folklore themes, and Northern landscapes (Zaria). This is the period of his early development as an artist, which coincided with Nigeria's Independence. The idea of projecting the African personality was of major importance to the artists of this period. It was also at this time that the Zaria Arts Society, the forerunner of the Society of Nigerian Artists (SNA), was formed and accompanied by the propagation of the concept of "natural synthesis". Works in this category include the paintings "Awhaire & the Bird", "Hunters Secret", and "A Tree in Northern Landscape", and the lino-cut prints "Zaria Indigo", "Two Faces", "Boli Woman" and "Awakening (Negritude)".

The second segment focuses on the artist's workshop experiments and his Bronzed lino relief series, otherwise known as the Sunshine Period (1962–1967), in which period he started to attend various workshops. Some of the popular works of this period include "Leopard in a Cornfield" (Iino print), "Scarecrow" (silkscreen) and "Man & Two Wives" (silkscreen).

The Mask and the Cross (1967–78) series represents the period when the artist executed several Christian themes commissioned by the Church, such as Nativity II (Iino engraving), The Last Days of Christ (plastocast), Obara Ishoshi (bronzed Iino relief) and Pope John Paul (metal foil), as well as the Plastography Period, a time when the artist developed a lot of ideas he started in Zaria in the late 1950s and early 1960s, such as Travellers II, Songs of Life, and Rain & Cry at Otorogba.

The fourth segment represents the historical vignettes. These are pictures known as the Symbols of Ancestral Groves (1978–84) They depict historical figures, mostly royalty from the Benin Kingdom such as Oba Aka. Other works in this period include Eghrighri and Ibiebe and the tortoise and enemu.

The Sahelian Masquerades (1984–88) were pieces created to highlight the destruction of the environment These works focused on the cultures of the Sahelian regions Works in this period are also loaded with a lot of political undertones such as Horns Of Freedom, and Edjo Aton (principles of good governance), which draws a lot of attention to role of government in relation to the issues of desertification.

The Mask Series (1990–1995) represent the development of images, which inspired depictions of masks treated in different print media that bring out the philosophies of the people. They also address' the subject of change. Images I and /I as well as A Panel of 15 represent this period.

Social Unrest (1995–99) is a period of conflict within the society. This is depicted in large paintings, which function as requests for assistance regarding the military governance and political instability. Here we have drawings and pictures, which focus on the murder of Ken Saro Wiwa. On the front burner, are the ecological and socio-economic problems. In this segment you have works such as Ekugbe (Unity), Nude & Protest and Smoke from the Broken Pipe.

Finally we enter the Installations Period (1995 – Date), which is the period the artist embarked on installations as an art form. These works are characterised by the arrangement of different discarded materials to create works of art. These installations were essentially to draw attention to importance of protecting our environment. Works in this category include Animals of Eve, Adjene, New City III and Voices of silenced Voices.

=== Innovations ===
Since 1966, as an experimental artist, Onobrakpeya has discovered, innovated and perfected several techniques both in printmaking and relief sculpture that are uniquely Nigerian. Generally, printmaking is a fine art process of producing pictures from a plate which the artist has previously created. Having conceived the idea, the artist then creates an image or images on a plate through any of the printmaking techniques. The images are then transferred onto a paper or any other surface by printing or embossing method. The advantage is that the artist can use one of such plates to produce as many copies of the artwork as required, sometimes giving them various colours. Onobrakpeya has increased the techniques tremendously.

Bronzed lino Relief is a collage of used lino blocks with bronze colour patina. Onobrakpeya developed this relief technique in 1966 as a way of preserving used blocks which in themselves possess sculptural qualities.

Plastocast Relief is a painted low-relief design that was cast with resin. The idea started as an extension of the bronzed lino relief. The used plastograph plates (like used lino blocks) have sculptural low relief effects which make them unique as art works. An attempt to retain the original used plates, and at the same time give collectors a chance to possesses and share the beauty of the original, led Onobrakpeya to develop a method of creating other original plates from existing used plates through the use of plaster of Paris. Sometimes, small plates with the same or similar themes are arranged together and cast to form a larger picture. A further development in plastocast relief is carving directly on abandoned or congealed plaster of Paris then applying resin on the cast and pulling out a positive. However, for a deep engraving on plaster of Paris to produce bold relief, depends on the nature of the plaster of Paris. This is known as plastocast plate. It is painted or tinted plastocast plate that becomes a plastocast relief.

Plastograph is a term given by Onobrakpeya to describe his deep etching technique that he innovated in 1967 through what he referred to as the Hydrochloric Acid Accident. It is an engraving on a low relief surface made of zinc or similar surface material and printed in the intaglio style.

Additive Plastograph is another technique that involves making of print images on a sheet of sand paper, using glue as a drawing medium. This is glued to the sand paper using intensive solar heat. Ink is then applied to the resultant images by the intaglio inking process. Any link in excess is wiped off with a dry cloth. This is later taken to the press to register the relief already created by the glue on a soaked and semi-dried cartridge printing paper. Finally, the registered impressions are painted, using pastel oil to achieve the desired forms by the artist.

Metal Foil Deep Etching is a plastograph print in which aluminium foil is used to draw the engraved images. The thin foil is cut and placed on an engraved plate and then the embossed sheet is removed, turned over and filled with resin to stabilise the relief. The resin filled foil is then laminated on plywood or no any other surface. Onobrakpeya first started experimenting with foils and from the experiments transformed the foils into a print medium in the 1980s. He used already printed plates to try out the technique.

Metal Foil Relief Print is a three-dimensional metal foil print drawn on a plastocast plate. A fairly thick foil is cut and placed over a plate and hand pressed to transfer the shape of the picture on the plate. The foil is then removed and filled from behind. It is then laminated onto a plywood and coloured in the same way as the metal foil deep etching print process already discussed above. Note that while the metal foil deep etching print is drawn from plastograph plates, the metal foil relief print is hand embossed on a plastograph plate.

Ivorex is a new technique, recently developed by Onobrakpeya, which simulates optical effect of old ivory engraving on bone or elephant tusk. The material used, however, is polymer.

==== Ibiebe alphabets and ideograms ====
Ibiebe is a writing style developed by Onobrakpeya. It features his invented script of ideographic geometric and curvilinear glyphs. The designs reflect the artist's knowledge of his Urhobo heritage, rich in symbols and the proverbs they elicit, as well as his appreciation of Chinese, Japanese, Ghanaian and Nigerian calligraphy. Onobrakpeya invented and refined this script called Ibiebe from 1978 to 1986, when he revisited in his art, ideas linked with traditional religion, customs and history. Ibiebe glyphs aim at encapsulating universal concepts of timeless values. The artist clearly delights in the script's forms and visual qualities as well as its power to communicate. These ibiebe ideograms which are often abstract, also lend themselves to calligraphic, painterly and sculptural presentation.

== Body of work ==
=== Public collections holding his work ===
- University of Lagos Library, Akoka, Lagos
- Catholic Chapel, University of Ife, Ile-Ife
- St. Paul’s Church, Ebute-Metta, Lagos
- National Gallery of Modern Art, National Theatre, Iganmu, Lagos
- St. John the Evangelist Church, Shogunle, Ikeja
- Museum of African and African-American Art and Antiquities, Buffalo, New York
- Eda Lord Demarest Memorial African Art Collection, University of Redlands
- University of Alberta, Edmonton, Alberta, Canada
- Vatican Museum, Rome
- National Museum of African Art, Smithsonian Institution, in Washington, D.C
- Hvittrask Suomi – Finland (Eliel Saarinen's Studio Home and Exhibition)
- Murtala Mohammed International Airport, Ikeja
- Leader of Victory Museum, Baghdad, Iraq
- Presidential Villa, Aso Rock, Abuja, Nigeria
- National Gallery, Nairobi, Kenya
- Victoria and Albert Museum London.
- The Metropolitan Museum of Art,
- Minneapolis Institute of Arts
- The British Museum.
- King Mohammed VI Collection Morocco.
- Tate Modern, London.
- Bennett College, Greensboro, North Carolina

==== Exhibitions ====
- Bruce Onobrakpeya: The Mask and the Cross, The High Museum of Art, Atlanta, Georgia, April 7 – July 30, 2023

=== Book illustrations ===
- Achebe, Chinua, No Longer At Ease, London: Heinemann
- Babalola, Adeboye, Iwe Ede Yoruba, Apa Kini, Longmans of Nigeria, 1961
- Ekwensi, Cyprian, An African Night’s Entertainment, Lagos: AUP, 1962
- Ekwensi, Cyprian, Juju Rock, AUP Lagos
- Nigerian Episcopal Conference, May Your Kingdom Come, London: Geoffery Chamman, 1969
- Nwankwo, Nkem, Tales Out of School (cover illustration), Ibadan: AUP
- Onadipe, Kola, Sugar Girl, AUP, 1964
- Uwemedimo, Rosemary, Akpan and the Smugglers, Ibadan: AUP, 1965
- Quacoopne, T. N. O., West African Religion, Ibadan: AUP, 1969
- Taiwo, Oladele, The Hunter And The Hen, Ibadan: AUP, 1969
- Haeger, Barbara, Africa: On Her Schedule is Written A Change, Ibadan: AUP, 1981
- Onadipe, Kola, Magic Land of the Shadows, Lagos: AUP, 1970
- Soyinka and Fagunwa, A Forest of a Thousand Demons, London: Nelson
- Deliss, Clementine, Seven Stories About Modern Art in Africa, White Chapel Art Gallery, London, 1985
- Nzekwu, Onuora and Michael Crowder, Eze Goes to School (cover Illustration), Ibadan: AUP, 1986
- Fagunwa, Daniel Orowole, Forest of A Thousand Daemons, City Lights, 2013 ISBN 9780872866300

=== Films and documentaries ===
- Kindreds Spirits: Contemporary Nigerian Artists, Smithsonian World Washington, D.C. USA
- The Magic of Nigeria. Produced by Delka/Polystar directed by Ola Balogun, Lagos, Nigeria.
- Recalling the Future Art by Joanna Grabski, Produced and directed by Claudine Pommier Executive Producer Cheikh Tidiane N'diaye./Arts in Action Society (Vancouver, Canada) 2002.
- The Harmattan Workshop Experience: The Journey so far: film and documentary on 10 years the Agbarha- Otor Harmattan workshop Experience produced and directed by Onobrakpeya, 2009.
- RedHot: Produced by Communication for Change, directed by Sandra Obiago, June 2011, Lagos, Nigeria.
