= The Only Son (novel) =

1966 novel by John Munonye

- Title page for The Only Son (1966)
- Author: John Munonye
- Language: English
- Genre: Fiction
- Published: 1966
- Publisher: Heinemann
- Publication place: Nigeria
- Media type: Print (paperback)
- ISBN: 9780435900212

The Only Son is the debut novel of Nigerian author John Munonye. The novel was first published in 1966 as part of the Heinemann African Writers Series. The novel follows an Igbo widow as she raises her son, Nnanna, who is educated at a Western school.

The tension between the mother and her son occupies much of the novel. The novel, like many of Munonye's other novels, follows the struggle of Nnanna to deal with the expectations placed on him by the rest of the community.
