= Olu Oguibe =

Nigerian-American artist and academic (born 1964)

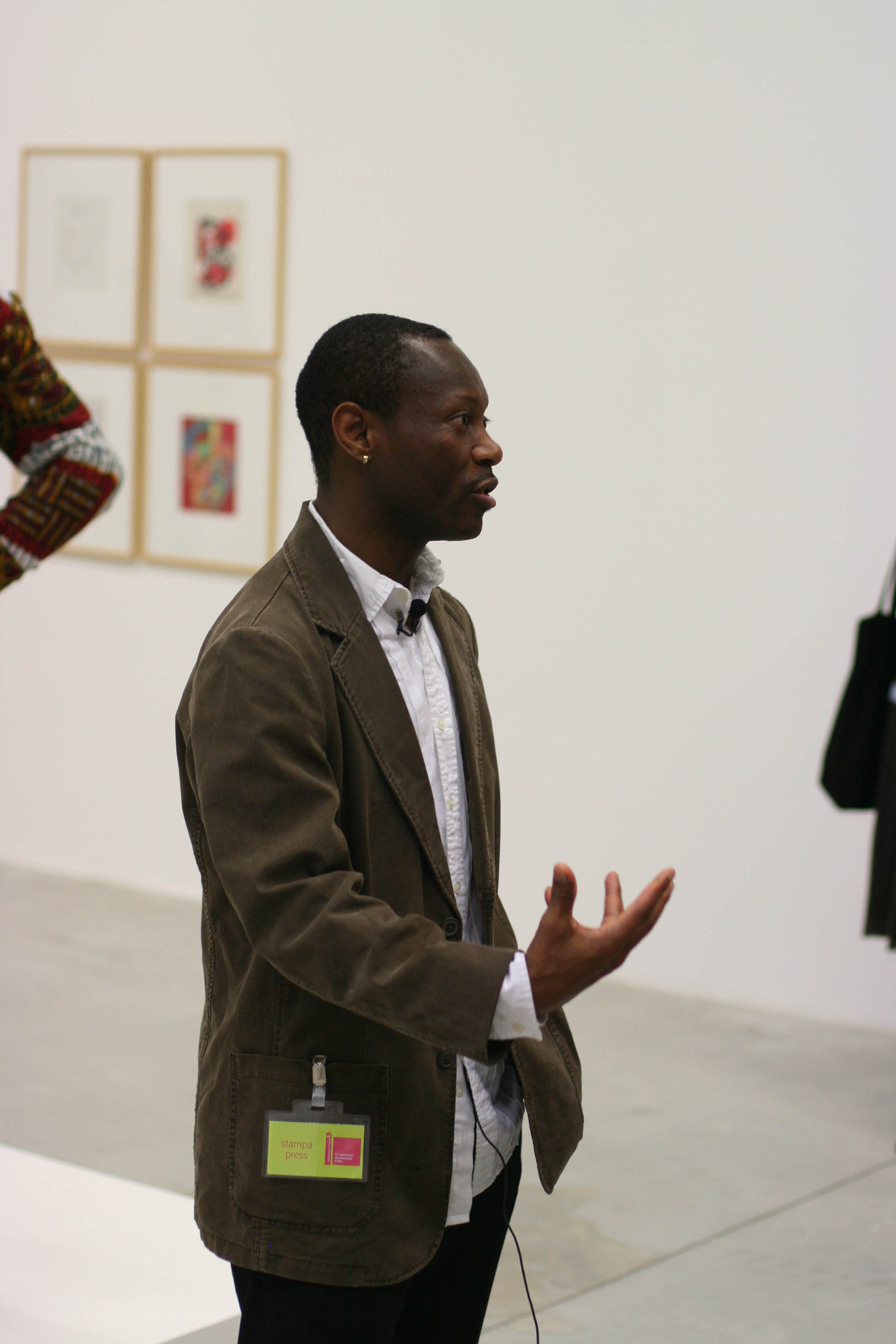
- Born: 14 October 1964 (age 61); Aba, Eastern Nigeria
- Education: University of Nigeria, Nsukka; School of Oriental and African Studies, University of London
- Occupations: Artist and academic
- Awards: State of Connecticut Governor's Arts Award (2013); Arnold Bode Prize (2017)
- Scientific career
- Fields: Conceptual art
- Workplaces: University of Connecticut
- Doctoral advisor: John Picton

Olu Oguibe (born 14 October 1964) is a Nigerian-born American artist and academic. Professor of Art and African-American Studies at the University of Connecticut, Storrs, Oguibe is a senior fellow of the Vera List Center for Art and Politics at the New School, New York City, and the Smithsonian Institution in Washington, DC. He is also an art historian, art curator, and leading contributor to post-colonial theory and new information technology studies. Oguibe is also known to be a well respected scholar and historian of contemporary African and African-American art and was honoured with the State of Connecticut Governor's Arts Award for excellence and lifetime achievement on 15 June 2013.

== Early life and education ==
Born on 14 October 1964 in Aba, Nigeria, Olu Oguibe received his first artistic experience from his father who was known to be a preacher, a former school teacher, a wood sculptor, and a sign painter. Oguibe's life was disrupted by the Nigerian Civil War in 1967–1970, but his family survived intact, and the artist later took part in traditional artistic activities in his home Igbo community. He was inspired by the Black Arts Movement that was happening between the years 1965–1975. He gained most of his inspiration from this movement to create his own, unique artwork. By the 1980s, Oguibe noticed a change in this movement such as black artists exhibiting, having their own black galleries, and black cultural centers. By 1990, the Black Arts Movement in Britain was practically over. Oguibe was educated in Nigeria and England. In 1986, he earned a bachelor's degree in Fine and Applied Arts from the University of Nigeria. In 1992, he received a PhD in art history from the School of Oriental and African Studies University of London for his thesis "Uzo Egonu: An African Artist in the West" (also the title of his 1995 book).

== Art ==
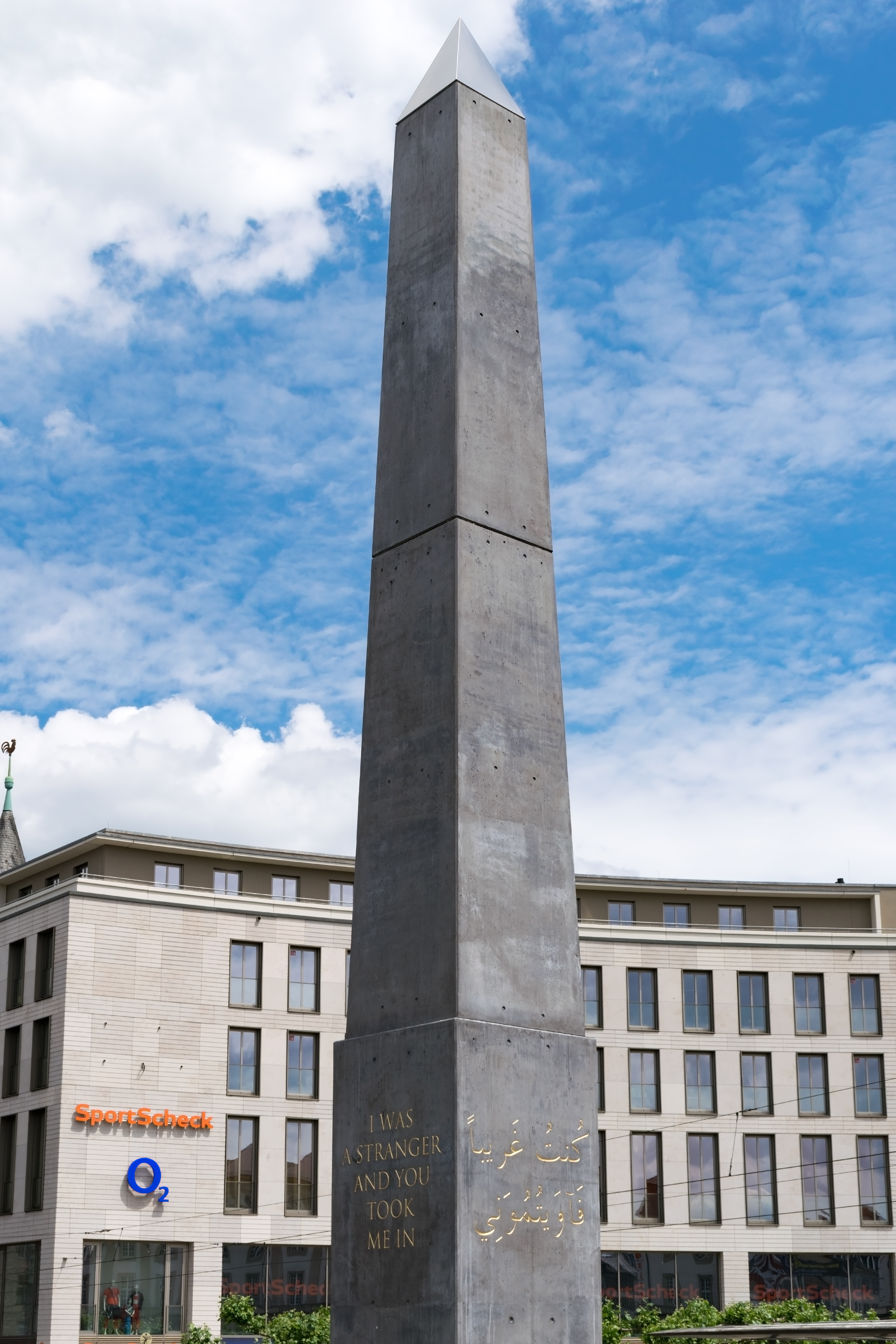
Monument to Strangers and Refugees, 16.20 m high

To date his art has been shown in major museums and galleries around the world including the Whitney Museum of American Art; the Whitechapel Gallery and the Barbican Centre in London; Migros Museum, Zurich; the Irish Museum of Modern Art, and Bonnefantenmuseum, Maastricht, among many others; as well as in the Havana, Busan, and Johannesburg biennials, and most recently at the 2007 Venice Biennial. His public art works may be found in Germany, Japan and Korea. Oguibe has previously taught in several colleges including the University of Illinois at Chicago and the University of South Florida, where he held the Stuart Golding Endowed Chair in African Art. His monumental public sculpture, Monument to Strangers and Refugees, was commissioned for Documenta 14 (2017). The concrete obelisk – inscribed in gold with a verse from Matthew 25:35, "I was a stranger and you took me in", in German, English, Arabic, and Turkish – was designed for Königsplatz (King's Square) in Kassel. For the work, Oguibe was awarded the Arnold Bode Prize in July 2017. In addition, a heated debate arose on social networks among organizers, journalists and other artists about the extent to which political thought and artistic work could really be separated. Oguibe's statements about the attacks on the satirical magazine Charlie Hebdo and about Hamas's actions in Israel raised strong concerns about the artist's actual moral integrity among those participating in the discussion and those who witnessed these statements. The Time Capsule was also another artwork that was done by Oguibe from which both works mentioned were conceived during a refugee crisis happening during the year 2014 and 2015. This crisis was known to be a critical period in Germany history and in Europe history where hundreds of thousands of people fled wars, poverty, and other atrocities.

== Teaching ==
In 1995, Oguibe moved to the United States and taught briefly at the Chicago campus of the University of Illinois. He now teaches at the University of South Florida in Tampa.

== International curator ==
He has also served as curator or co-curator for numerous exhibitions. These include the 2nd Biennale of Ceramics in Contemporary Art in Genoa and Albisola, Italy, in 2003; Vidarte 2002: International Video and Media Art Festival at the Palacio Postal, Mexico City, in 2002; Century City at the Tate Modern, London, in 2001; Authentic/Ex-centric: Africa in and out of Africa for the 49th Venice Biennale in 2001, and Five Continents and One City: 3rd International Salon of Painting at the Museo de la Ciudad, Mexico City, in 2000. He has served as advisor for the Dakar, Johannesburg, and Havana biennials and as critic-in-residence at the Art Omi International artists’ residency.

== Writer and critic ==
Oguibe's critical and theoretical writings have appeared in several key volumes, including The Dictionary of Art, Art History and its Methods, Art in Theory 1900–2000, The Visual Culture Reader, Finding a Place: Nigerian Artists in the Contemporary Art World, Photography, and the Substance of the Image, The Third Text Reader on Art and Culture, The Black British Culture and Society Reader, and Theory in Contemporary Art: From 1985 to the Present, as well as numerous serials such as Frieze, Flash Art International, Art Journal, Texte zur Kunst, Zum Thema, Third Text and Criterios. His most recent books include Reading the Contemporary: African Art from Theory to the Marketplace (MIT Press, 2000) and The Culture Game (University of Minnesota Press, 2004).

== Exhibitions ==
Cuba Project in Matanzas, Cuba, in 2019; 2nd Biennale of Ceramics in Contemporary Art in Genoa and Albisola, Italy, in 2003; Vidarte 2002: International Video and Media Art Festival at the Palacio Postal, Mexico City, in 2002; Century City at the Tate Modern, London, in 2001; Authentic/Ex-centric: Africa in and out of Africa for the 49th Venice Biennale in 2001;Five Continents and One City: 3rd International Salon of Painting at the Museo de la Ciudad, Mexico City, in 2000, and The Poetics of Line: Seven Artists of the Nsukka Group in 1997.
