= Uli (design) =

Traditional designs drawn by the Igbo people of Nigeria

Ụlị (commonly written as Uli or Uri)// are the curvilinear traditional designs drawn by the Igbo people of southeastern Nigeria. These designs are generally abstract, consisting of linear forms and geometric shapes, though there are some representational elements. Traditionally, these are either stained onto the body or painted onto the sides of buildings as murals. Designs are frequently asymmetrical and are often painted spontaneously. Uli is generally not sacred, apart from those images painted on the walls of shrines and created in conjunction with some community rituals. In addition, uli is not directly symbolic but instead focused on the creation of a visual impact and decorating the body of the patron or building in question.

The designs are almost exclusively produced by women, who decorate other people's with dark dyes to prepare for village events, such as marriage, title taking, or funerals, as well as for more everyday wear. Designs last approximately 8 days. Igbo women also paint uli murals on the walls of compounds and houses, using four basic pigments: black, white, yellow, and red. These designs last until the rainy season.

The drawing of uri was once practiced throughout most of Igboland, although by 1970 it had lost much of its popularity, and was being kept alive by a handful of contemporary artists. However, uli does continue to be practiced by some artists within Nigeria, some of whom have begun producing traditional designs on canvas. In addition, contemporary artists, such as the artists of the Nsukka group, have appropriated motifs and aesthetics of uli and incorporated them into other media, often combining these with other styles both from Nigeria and Europe.

== Origins ==
The name "uli" is derived from the Igbo names of the plants ( Uli Ede eji, Uli Nkilisi, Uli Abuba, Uli Nkpo, Uli Aru nmadu) that are processed to produce the dye used to stain on designs. According to local mythology, the practice developed as a gift from Ala, the goddess of earth, who blessed women with the ability to create art, as demonstrated through the creation of uli. The designs themselves are derived from natural forms such as animal patterns, like leopard spots or python markings, as well as other abstract forms, such as the female body or knotted designs. Though the historical origins of the practice of uli are unknown, uli designs have been found on Igbo-ukwu bronzes, indicating that the practice has been in usage since the 9th century.

== Characteristics ==
Uli designs are characterized by swelling and tapering curves interspersed with angled lines and abstract motifs. These designs are either stained onto the body or painted onto walls, and are temporary in both cases, wearing off in a week on the body and washing off walls during the rainy season. The process of creating Uli is not described as painting in the Igbo language, but rather as writing (ide uli) or drawing (ise uli). Though murals can be preserved for longer, generally the designs are instead replaced allowing for spiritual renewal. In addition to their temporary nature, uli are also spontaneous in creation and design. The focus of these designs is not on a larger meaning or message, but instead on the visual effect produced by the design as a whole. Though the designs are often created to commemorate a ritual or are placed on shrines, they are generally not believed to be sacred.

The characteristics vary depending on whether designs are being placed on a wall or on the body. When used as body art, uli designs are meant to complement certain aspects of the body, often the legs or neck, and are generally fully abstract. Though specific designs are placed separately across the body, they are treated as a single piece of artwork. Uli designs on walls, or uli aja, are more likely to include depictions of human and animal forms. In addition, a distinctive series of stippled white dots (ntupo) are often used to separate different designs or sections of the wall.

Uli artists generally focus on creating a variation of contrast, a clarity of lines, and a balanced distribution of forms that work within the space being used. The drawings focus both on the designs directly applied with pigment and the shape of the negative space created between. Distinct styles have developed in different areas around Southern Nigeria. For example, in Nri-Alwka, designs tend to focus on slender tapering lines with small and sparing usage of motifs, while in Arochukwu designs are heavier and more densely packed with heavy use of motifs and nested designs. Within these regional variations individual uli artists have unique and recognizable styles, and, even in the collective drawing of designs, relative rank and talent are acknowledged.

=== Motifs ===
A large part of uli are the repeated abstract designs, or motifs, that are reused and adapted across different pieces. These motifs are named for either the part of the natural environment they resemble, the method of execution used to make the design, or the abstract shape they form. For example, the isnwaogi motif is named for the three-lobed nut, and the aswolago motif is for after the snake. These motifs are often specific to particular villages but spread through marriage or migration. However, unlike the Nsibidi, a system of symbols developed by male secret societies in Igbo culture, these uli motifs are not meant to be representative but are simply named for what their designs resemble.

== Methods ==
=== Body art ===
Uli designs are commissioned by a patron, often after seeing an uli artist's work elsewhere. The patron requests a specific style or motif or leaves the design to the discretion of the artist. Before application, the person to be painted is shaved in order to create a smooth surface. Ufie, a dust or paste made from camwood bark, is applied to the skin as an antiperspirant. The berries of one of the uli plants, such as Rothmana whitfieldi or Cremaspora trifora, are harvested and ground up into a mash. This mash is then pressed through a cloth, producing a yellowish liquid that is stored in a receptacle. Dried uli seeds can also be re-hydrated and then pressed in order to create the dye. Charcoal may be mixed with the uli liquid so that the design is clearly visible while being drawn. The liquid can be applied with a variety of tools, such as a small blunt knife (mmanwauli), slivers of wood, or metal combs. The dye then oxidizes, staining the skin an indigo color that lasts for approximately 8 days. After the staining process is complete, the skin is rubbed with oil in order to create a distinctive sheen.

=== Murals ===
Uli murals (uli aja) are created using white, yellow, reddish brown, and black pigments. The white color is made from clay, the yellow from either soil or tree bark, the reddish brown from camwood tree dye, and the black color from charcoal. The charcoal color is more permanent than the other pigments, leaving behind designs that are then sometimes reworked into new drawings. A blue color, created from a laundry additive introduced by the British, has also been used by some artists. Before the pigments are applied, the walls are first sized using laterite (aja upa), a mud slip that fills in cracks in the wall. The surface is then further burnished using fine pebbles (mkpulu nwko). A final layer of primer, a red mud slip, is then applied to the wall in order to create a three-dimensional surface to work on. Artists apply this slip by moving their fingers in rhythmic patterns, creating curvilinear patterns on the surface of the wall. The pigments are then mixed with water and applied to the wall using the artist's hands, twigs, feathers, or using the mmanwauli (uli knife). Currently, some artists choose to use sponges or paint brushes to apply pigment. The designs are often applied by a larger group of women but generally are designed by the most experienced and skilled.

== Usage in Igbo culture ==
=== Body art ===
Uli body art is painted for both formal occasions and everyday wear. Women traditionally wear uli for a variety of reasons, such as going to market to sell wares, meeting a prospective husband, getting married, giving birth, attending burial rites, or attaining of a title. Dance groups also choose distinctive uli designs that all members will wear when performing in a different village in order to distinguish themselves from the locals and to represent the village they originated from. Men also wear uli designs for formal occasions such as attaining a title. In addition, wrestlers would wear uli into fights.

=== Murals ===
Uli murals are painted on a variety of different buildings. They are commonly found on public shrines as decorations, where they tend to have more abstract, austere designs painted by experienced women in muted colors. However, uli are also found on domestic buildings, painted as markers of a significant life event, such as a marriage, or as a marker of wealth and success. These murals are often executed by all female members of a compound working together and generally involve more human or animal forms than shrine designs.

== Decline and modern reincorporation ==
After the introduction of Christian missionaries the practice of uli declined across Nigeria and uli began to be viewed as too heavily associated with Odinani and not reconcilable with Christianity. Women were discouraged from traditional methods of Uli art by missionaries but often were encouraged to continue uli in other media. The Mary Slessor Memorial School, a Christian marriage training center, taught students from Igboland to recreate uli designs in embroidery. These designs were then sold by the school. Many uli designs were also copied by Western observers onto paper or canvas. The Pitt Rivers Museum archives over one hundred of these copied designs, though they lack attribution to the original artists. In addition, modernization has also prevented usage of traditional techniques. Cement has replaced traditional building materials, radically changing the methods that would be used to apply murals. Though the practice is widely remembered, currently many remaining uli artists are elderly and do not have apprentices.

However, in the 1970s, contemporary Nigerian artists began to incorporate traditional uli designs into their art. At the Nigeria College of Arts, Science and Technology, the Zaria Art Society was formed with the goal of synthesizing European and native traditions. Uche Okeke, a founding member, adapted uli as a basis for "a new visual language" separate from western forms. His work in the Nsukka School is said to have led to a renewal of uli aesthetics in Nigeria, as the Zaria Society eventually morphed into the Uli Revivalist Movement that continued through the 20th century. These primarily male artists were at times criticized for drawing on a traditionally female art form without properly acknowledging current practitioners. Over time, modern female artists have also incorporated uli into their art, such as Chinwe Uwatse, who uses similar swelling lines and curves in her watercolor paintings.

In 1991, Doris Weller and Meki Nwezi established the Ama Dialog near Onitsha, with a similar goal of creating a dialog between the modern and the traditional and the African and the European. The Ama Dialog created a collective of uli artists with the goal of transferring traditional designs onto paper and canvas and moving the focus of the study of uli back to the women who originally practiced the art form. This eventually developed into the Upa Women Artists Collective, which trained traditional artists to use an acrylic binder with traditional pigments to create paintings to be sold both in Nigeria and abroad in Germany.
