= Demas Nwoko =

Nigerian artist, designer and architect (born 1935

- Born: 1935 (age 90–91); Idumuje Ugboko
- Education: College of Arts, Science and Technology (now Ahmadu Bello University)
- Occupations: Artist, designer and architect
- Known for: Fine Art (Painting, Sculpting), Architecture (Design and Build), Stage Designer, Theatre Director, Wood worker, Writer
- Notable work: ARCHITECTURE- New Culture Studio Ibadan, The Dominican Monastery Ibadan, Oba Akenzua Theatre Benin, Benedictine Monastery Ewu, Demas Nwoko Family house Idumuje-Ugboko, etc ART- Soja Come Soja go, Beggar, Bathing women, The philosopher, Adam and Eve, Rickshaw man, Mama Teddar (Wall mural in Teddar hall University of Ibadan), Carved Pillars departure hall Muritala Mohammed Airport, etc BOOKS - Impoverished Generation, New Culture Magazine, Philosophy of an African Democracy
- Movement: Independence
- Awards: Officer of the Order of the Niger (OON); Golden Lion for Lifetime Achievement at the 18th Venice Biennale of Architecture 2023

Demas Nwoko (born 1935) is a Nigerian artist, protean designer, architect and master builder. In the 1960s, he was a member of the Mbari club of Ibadan, a committee of burgeoning Nigerian and foreign artists. He was also a lecturer at the University of Ibadan. In the 1970s, he was the publisher of the now defunct New Culture magazine.

Nwoko, sees design as an ingenuous activity that carries with it a focus on social responsibility for positive influences in the environment and culture of the society.

In 2023, Nwoko was awarded the Golden Lion for Lifetime Achievement at the International Architecture Exhibition of 18th Venice Biennale of Architecture.

== Biography ==
=== Early life ===
Nwoko was born in 1935 in Idumuje Ugboko, a town that now has as its Obi (King) Nwoko's nephew (Chukwunomso Nwoko). He grew up in Idumuje Ugboko appreciating the newly constructed architectural edifices in the town and in the palace of the Obi, his father. He went to study fine arts at the College of Arts, Science and Technology, in 1956, a year after the college was moved from its original location in Ibadan to Zaria. In 1962, he received a scholarship from the Congress of Cultural Freedom to study at the Centre Français du Théâtre in Paris where he learned scenic design.

=== Zaria art school ===
From 1957 to 1961, he studied Fine Arts at the former College of Arts, Science and Technology, Zaria, Kaduna State, northwest Nigeria (now Ahmadu Bello University), where he was exposed to conventional Western techniques in art, though like most of the artists at the school their subject matter was predominantly African. In the late 1950s, together with Uche Okeke, Simon Okeke, Bruce Onobrakpeya and few other art students, he formed the Art Society. This was during a period dominated by nationalistic fervour, with the attainment of national political independence in 1960. The Art Society became known for championing Natural Synthesis, a term coined by Uche Okeke to describe the combination of contemporary Western art techniques and African ideas, art forms, and themes.

== Pan-Africanism and early artwork ==
Folly (1960)

In the 1950s, Nigeria's campaign for self-rule was dominated by two major ideas on how to achieve a truly independent and stable polity. One was based on regions as the foundation of the nation-state and politicians used the regions as a stepping stone for political success, the other embraced the ideas that emanated from the early Nigerian Youth Movement and the Zikist Movements to employ themes of Pan-Africanism and to forgo the regions as the foundation of the future Nigerian polity. In his art work, Nwoko moved slightly towards the latter. Nwoko's early sculpture and painting style were inspired by the findings at Nok. A lot of his early sculptures and paintings can be described as one of extrapolation. His terracotta's were designs that extended and expressed the art forms of the Ancient Nok with less deviation from an ancient African theme. This allowed the work to express less ambiguity and more clarity of intentions and to showcase a modern African art form.

== Architectural design ==
After completing his studies at Zaria and Paris, he moved to Ibadan in 1963. In Ibadan, he originally concentrated on designs for theatrical productions of the University of Ibadan's department of Drama while he was also a lecturer at the university. While in the ancient city, he was sometimes short on cash and expenses to build or buy a house and studio for his work. He then decided to build his studio and house from traditional methods to complement his cash shortage. He used clay and laterite found around the site chosen and built a brick house and studio from the natural resources lying around.

His inventiveness in using modern and new techniques for selected and protean African art works led to his name being spread around town and in the country. Nwoko's first major architectural design was for a Dominican mission in Ibadan. After the nation's independence, some missions desired to decorate their churches with African motifs. He was originally approached to design a plaque for a new chapel but he later asked the Dominican fathers to help in designing a new chapel to be located in Ibadan. Although, his initial design was a little bit crude with the utilisation of free-hand drawing, it was meant to accommodate local exigencies such as the sunny atmosphere in Ibadan. Usually, his designs were designed to have interior temperatures to be in contrast to the exterior temperatures at most times. His style was moulded to fit into the temporal needs of African citizens in a given location.

Nwoko later went on to design more structures such as the Benin theatre, which used Greek and the Japanese Kabuki designs. He also designed the scepter for his brother's coronation as the Obi of Idumoje Ugboko. Other famous architectural works includes the cultural center, Ibadan, which made use of natural forms to emphasise its relationship with nature and ancient Yoruba art.

Nwoko's works fuse modern techniques in architecture and stage design with African tradition. With works such as The Dominican Institute, Ibadan and The Akenzua Cultural Center, Benin, to his credit, Nwoko is one "artist-architect" who believes in celebrating the African tradition in his works. In 2007, Farafina Books published The Architecture of Demas Nwoko, a study of Nwoko's work and theories written by two British architects, John Godwin OBE and Gillian Hopwood. Reviewing the book, African Book Publishing Record states:

The Dominican Institute was his first major architectural project. He asked the Dominicans if he could assist them in their new building. The Dominican fathers, were eager to incorporate African motifs in their new buildings in Ibadan. Nwoko's designs perfectly fit their needs.

Nwoko's studies in Zaria and Paris had prepared him well for his plan of combining African art with modern ideas of European art. He began designing for University of Ibadan theatrical productions. It was his new ideas, which led to his work with the Dominicans and that success led to his subsequent works throughout Nigeria, including the Oba Akenzua Theater in Benin City, Nigeria. The Oba Akenzua Theater uses Japanese and Greek designs in an African setting. He also designed the cultural centre in Ibadan and a sceptre his brother's coronation. His brother is the Obi of Idumoje Ugboko.

In addition to his architecture Nwoko has many other accomplishments in the arts. He co-published New Culture, a leading arts magazine, pointing the way toward new movements in African art. He led the way toward a modern mode of expression in African art, theatre, painting, and architecture. In addition, he is a fine actor and dancer, having performed in numerous plays in Ibadan. He also is a distinguished professor in Ibadan.

Godwin and Hopwood manage to capture all of these facets of Nwoko's career while keeping the focus on his architecture. Nwoko belongs to that generation of artists, along with Chinua Achebe and Wole Soyinka, who fought for Nigerian independence artistically as well as politically

== Stage design ==
The success of Amos Tutuola's Palmwine Drinkard owes a little bit of credit to the effort of Nwoko. His inventive creations helped organise the choreography and direction of the play and brought to life the themes of Tutuola in every act of the play. His body of stage design and direction, which started at Ibadan includes Wole Soyinka's A Dance of the Forests, Bertholt Brecht's Der Kaukasische Kreidekreis (The Caucasian Chalk Circle), and the Mbari Theatre production of John Pepper Clark's The Masquerade.

== See also ==
- List of Nigerian architects

== Publications ==
- John Godwin and Gillian Hopwood: The architecture of Demas Nwoko. Lagos, Farafina, 2007. ISBN 978-9780688431
