= Yusuf Grillo =

Nigerian artist and educationist(1934–2021)

Yusuf Adebayo Cameron Grillo
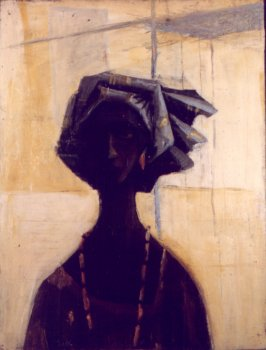
- Yoruba Bride by Yusuf Grillo
- Born: 16 December 1934; Brazilian Quarters of Lagos, Nigeria
- Died: 23 August 2021 (aged 86)
- Known for: Contemporary art

Yusuf Grillo (16 December 1934 – 23 August 2021) was a Nigerian contemporary painter, muralist and sculptor, known for his inventive works and the prominence of the color blue in many of his paintings. He was the founding president of the Society of Nigerian Artists. He also served as the Chairman, Visual Arts Committee of the Festival of Black Arts and Culture (FESTAC), 1977, Chairman, Lagos State Council for Arts and Culture, circa 1980, Vice President, International Association of Art. He was also Director of the Yaba College of Technology School of Art from the 1970s till 1985.

== Life ==
Yusuf Grillo was born in the Brazilian Quarters of Lagos Island and attended Nigerian College of Arts, Science and Technology in Zaria, where he received a diploma in Fine Arts and a post-graduate diploma in education in 1961. He later studied various specialist courses at Cambridge University and later travelled to Germany and the United States of America. He started to teach at Yaba Technical Institute in 1962 under Paul Mount, the then Head of Department.

Grillo is considered to have been one of Nigeria's outstanding academically trained painters; he emerged to prominence and international recognition in the 1960s and 1970s, while exhibiting a large collection of his early works. He makes use of his western art training in many of his paintings, combining western art techniques with traditional Yoruba sculpture characteristics. His preference for colour blue in natural settings paintings is sometimes similar to the adire or resist-dye textiles used in Nigeria. He was at one time the Head of the Department of Art and Printing at Yaba College of Technology. After his retirement in 1987, he spent his life as a full-time studio artist in his Ikeja, Lagos studio.

Yusuf Grillo was married to Iyabo Amope Grillo, and had 5 children - Morayo Anthonio, Bodunrin Adeyemi, Gboyega Grillo, Farouk Grillo and Jubril Grillo.

== Death ==
He died from complications from COVID-19 on 23 August 2021.

== Notable works ==
- Drummers return currently exhibited at Yemisi Shyllon Museum of Art
- Sultan Bello Mural
- Mother and child
- Moslem Woman
- Abe nu gongo, 1993
