= ART X Lagos =

Art exhibition in Lagos, Nigeria

- Genre: Contemporary art from Africa and its diaspora
- Frequency: Annual
- Location: Lagos, Nigeria
- Inaugurated: 2016; 10 years ago
- Founder: Tokini Peterside-Schwebig
- Website: artxlagos.com

ART X Lagos is an art fair in Lagos, Nigeria. It is the leading international art fair in West Africa, founded and launched in 2016, and eight editions have been held so far. The tenth edition of the fair will take place between 6–9 November 2025.

== Founding and character ==
ART X Lagos was created in 2016 by Tokini Peterside-Schwebig, a Nigerian entrepreneur and art collector, to showcase and support the breadth of contemporary art from Africa and its diaspora. It draws local patrons and a host of international collectors, curators, and critics annually.

ART X Lagos is a four-day affair, featuring art galleries in Africa and the Diaspora showcasing established as well as emerging artists. The fair also includes a talks programme, ART X Talks, featuring local and international speakers, as well as special projects to engage its varied audiences, and live art and music performances at ART X Live! and a newly introduced screening programme, known as ART X Cinema.

In 2020, due to the COVID-19 pandemic, ART X Lagos was held as an online art fair. ART X Lagos returned with a physical fair in 2021, the first in-person fair in Africa since the pandemic struck. Following the success of the 2023 fair, preparations began in earnest for the 2024 fair, which took place between 31 October - 3 November 2024.

== First edition ==
The first edition of ART X Lagos was held from 4–6 November 2016. It showcased contemporary art by more than 60 established and emerging artists with participating galleries from 10 countries in Africa, including Nigeria, South Africa, Ghana and Mali, and was artistically directed by Bisi Silva. The debut fair welcomed thousands of visitors from around Nigeria and the world.

Notable artists who exhibited at the first edition include William Kentridge, Barthelemy Togou, Sokari Douglas-Camp, Ghana Amer, Victor Ehikhamenor, Gerald Chukwuma, Amadou Sanogo, Owusu Ankomah, Jeremiah Quarshie, and Obiageli Okigbo among others. Speakers at ART X Talks included El Anatsui, Bruce Onobrakpeya, Prince Yemisi Shyllon, and Zoé Whitley.

== Second edition ==
The second edition was held from 3–5 November 2017 and welcomed thousands of visitors to see the works of artists from more than 15 countries across Africa.

The fair featured galleries from Nigeria, South Africa, Ghana, Senegal, Cameroon, Ivory Coast, Mali and the United Kingdom. Notable artists included Yinka Shonibare (MBE), Zanele Muholi, Modupeola Fadugba, Nandipha Mntambo, Virginia Chihota, Boris Nzebo, Babatunde Olatunji, Pamela Phatsimo Sunstrum, Portia Zvavahera and Lakin Ogunbanwo among others.

The fair also included special project exhibitions by solo artists, curated by Missla Libsekal, notable among which was an exhibition of seven life-sized wooden sculptures by Nigeria's pioneer modernist Ben Enwonwu, to commemorate his centenary. Speakers at ART X Talks included Njideka Akunyili Crosby, Lemi Ghariokwu, Peju Alatise, Stacy Hardy and Wura-Natasha Ogunji.

== Third edition ==
The third edition was held from 2–4 November 2018. For the first time, the fair featured East African artists and exhibitors, from countries such as Kenya, Uganda, and Ethiopia.

A key highlight of the 2018 fair was a special exhibition by Yinka Shonibare CBE, exploring his career highlights, curated by Missla Libsekal. Ben Enwonwu's masterpiece "Tutu" (1974), the highest selling African artwork at auction at the time, was also exhibited at the fair, its first public showcase in Lagos in more than 40 years.

Other notable artists included Cyrus Kabiru, Sokari Douglas Camp CBE, Zanele Muholi, Paul Onditi, Victor Butler, Nike Davies-Okundaye, Tadesse Mesfin, and Aboudia, among others.

Speakers at ART X Talks, included Yinka Shonibare CBE, Chika Okeke-Agulu, Aboubakar Fofana, Peju Layiwola, HRM Igwe Nnaemeka Alfred Achebe, and Meskerem Assegued.

== Fourth edition ==
The fourth edition was held from 1–3 November 2019, and welcomed visitors from across the world, with more than 90 artists exhibited from 25 countries. The 2019 edition saw the introduction of ART X Modern, a section of the fair dedicated to pioneers of African modern art from the mid-20th century, as well as a Performance Pavilion, featuring three performance works over the weekend.

A key highlight of the 2019 fair was ART X Talks, which featured a keynote address from Wangechi Mutu. Other notable speakers included Emeka Ogboh, N'Goné Fall, Kathryn Weir, Joel Benson and Reni Folawiyo.

Yusuf Grillo, Ablade Glover, Joy Labinjo, Sam Nhlengethwa, Nelson Makamo, Titza Berhanu, Jems Koko Bi, Demas Nwoko, Lady Skollie, and Uche Okeke were among the notable artists exhibited in this edition.

The fair featured a range of curated projects including the work of Emeka Ogboh, curated by Tayo Ogunbiyi, as well as three performance pieces curated by Wura-Natasha Ogunji.

== Fifth edition ==
The fifth edition was held from 2–9 December 2020. It was presented as an online-only art fair on the relaunched ARTXLAGOS.COM and was bolstered by an extensive virtual program of 13 events.

The 2020 edition saw the presentation of New Nigeria Studios, an online exhibition that showcased the stories of select photographers and filmmakers who took to the streets of Nigeria in protest in October 2020, as well as ART X Review - The Wrap Up with Njideka Akunyili Crosby, a masterclass for emerging artists discussing the growth, place and potential of the artist in today's world.

A key highlight of the 2020 fair was ART X Talks, which featured artist Hank Willis Thomas and Opal Tometi, co-founder of Black Lives Matter. Other notable speakers included Folarin "Falz" Falana, Lola Ogunnaike, Freda Isingoma, Lemi Ghariokwu, Yagazie Emezi and Kelechi Amadi-Obi.

The exhibiting artists included Ouattara Watts, Aboudia, Ben Osawe, François-Xavier Gbré, Ablade Glover, Nike Okundaye Davies, Boris Nzebo, Abe Odedina, Angele Etoundi Essamba, Olu Ajayi, Wole Lagunju and Tiffanie Delune among others.

The fair's programme also featured ART X Live! which presented the short performance film "Like Someone's Watching", a special project titled the Graveyard of Ideas, "40 Minutes with...", a series of conversations with the fair's exhibiting galleries across their various locations.

== Sixth edition ==
The sixth edition was held from 4–7 November 2021 at The Federal Palace Lagos, and extended online until 21 November at ARTXLAGOS.COM. It welcomed 30 leading galleries, presenting artworks by 120 artists from Africa and its diaspora.

It featured a range of curated projects, including "Future Africa" and "Unfolding Layers of Time" curated by Aude Christel Mgba, and an interactive project "We Are Here" curated by AWCA.

ART X Talks featured critically acclaimed speakers including a conversation in collaboration with the Smithsonian National Museum of African Art. Notable speakers included Prince Yemisi Shyllon, Kavita Chellaram, Osinachi, Hakeem Adedeji, Bonaventure Soh Bejeng Ndikung, Kelani Abass, Emmanuel Iduma and Nengi Omuku.

Key highlights of the 2021 fair included "Reloading...", an NFT exhibition featuring 10 of Africa's most exciting digital artists in collaboration with SuperRare, curated by Africa's foremost crypto-artist Osinachi, and Maurice Chapot and Ayo Lawson In addition, a special presentation, "Art of Yusuf Grillo", was curated by kó in celebration of the life and legacy of acclaimed Nigerian artist Yusuf Grillo.

Exhibiting artists at the fair included Amoako Boafo, Aboudia, J.D. 'Okhai Ojeikere, Mous Lamrabat, Benji Reid, Ouattara Watts, Nike Okundaye Davies, Joana Choumali, Boris Nzebo, Anjel (Boris Anje), Dmitri Fagbouhoun, among others.

== Seventh Edition ==
The seventh edition was held from 4–6 November 2022 at The Federal Palace, Lagos and featured 31 galleries presenting over 120 artists from across Africa and its Diaspora, with a virtual exhibition on Artsy.

The special projects at the fair spoke distinctly to the theme "Who Will Gather Under The Baobab Tree?" while highlighting experimental mediums and the multidisciplinary artists working in them. Featured artists and commissioned projects included Victor Ehikhamenor's sculptural installation "Ulin-Noifo, The Lineage That Never Ends", Linda Dounia's digital exhibition "Once Upon A Garden", "The conversation we must have" by Matthew Eguavoen, and a special performance by Ranti Bam titled "Sowing Seeds in Hearthland". Other presenting artists included Angèle Etoundi Essamba, Anthony Nsofor, Carl-Edouard Keïta, Austin Uzor, Blaise Vernyuy, Cecilia Lamptey Botchway, Demas Nwanna Nwoko.

== Eighth Edition ==
The eighth edition was held from 2–5 November 2023 at The Federal Palace, Victoria Island, Lagos. The fair's theme, The Dialogue, explored ideas and elicited reflection, conversation, discussion, and negotiation.

The amphitheater played host to programmed events including ART X Talks, The Development Forum, ART X Live!, and the newly introduced ART X Cinema.

ART X Cinema — an audio-visual experience that showcased the works of 15 artists from across Africa and its Diaspora.

Featured artists and commissioned projects included Bruce Onobrakpeya, The Nigeria Imaginary Incubator Project presented by the Museum of West African Art (MOWAA), Dennis Osadebe in collaboration with NBA Africa, Ibrahim Mahama, Ifeoma Fafunwa, and more.

== Ninth Edition ==
The ninth edition was held from 31 October - 3 November 2024 at The Federal Palace, Lagos, and featured an extended virtual exhibition on Artsy.

From Harare, Zimbabwe to Cotonou, Benin, 10 exhibitors were selected to present visionary artists from across Africa and its diaspora. The fair's programme also returned with The Projects, ART X Talks, ART X Cinema, ART X Live! and The Development Forum, as well as Art Across Borders and an expanded Schools' Programme.

ART X Cinema presented a curated selection of 13 films by a new generation of African and diaspora filmmakers and artists whose works challenge and illuminate the trajectories of African and African-descended people worldwide.

== Tenth Edition ==
In November 2025, ART X Lagos celebrated its milestone tenth anniversary—dubbed “10X”—with an expanded programme, record-breaking participation, and renewed commitment to deepening its impact. The fair took place from 6–9 November 2025 at the Federal Palace, Lagos, spanning four locations: Balmoral Marquee, Federal Palace Ballroom Marquee, Federal Palace Lobby, and the Waterfront Garden. This ambitious new format was introduced to mark the 10th edition.

Key dignitaries in attendance included the Governor of Lagos State, Mr. Babajide Sanwo-Olu; Nigeria's Coordinating Minister for the Economy and Finance Minister, Mr. Wale Edun; the Minister of Arts, Culture and the Creative Economy, Hon. Hannatu Musa Musawa; France's Ambassador to Nigeria, Mr. Marc Fonbaustier; and major industry leaders and sponsors.

=== Programming and Highlights ===
- Galleries and Artists: The 2025 edition featured 15 curated galleries in the Main Section—Affinity Art Gallery (Lagos, Nigeria); Afriart Gallery (Kampala, Uganda); Alexis Galleries (Lagos, Nigeria); Galerie MAM (Douala, Cameroon); Gallery 1957 (Accra, Ghana); kó (Lagos, Nigeria); Nike Art Gallery (Lagos, Nigeria); O’DA Art (Lagos, Nigeria); SMO Contemporary (Lagos, Nigeria); Tiwani Contemporary (London, UK); Wunika Mukan Gallery (Lagos, Nigeria); and Yenwa (Lagos, Nigeria). Spotlight Galleries: Launched this year, the Spotlight Galleries section featured a new generation of emerging galleries — ADEGBOLA (Lagos, Nigeria), AMG Projects (Lagos, Nigeria), and Nomadic Art Gallery (Lagos, Nigeria) — who presented focused solo exhibitions by emerging artists from the continent.
- Special Projects: Highlights included Nengi Omuku's “External Realities, Internal Geographies,” a major installation supporting her charity, TAOH Africa; Temitayo Ogunbiyi's participatory public art project, WHERE THERE IS LIFE, THERE IS HOPE: B’á ò kú, ìṣe ò tán, ; and “An Exacting Eye,” the inaugural ART X ICON exhibition dedicated to J.D. ’Okhai Ojeikere, whose installation will remain open to the public in the Federal Palace lobby until December 31, 2025.
- Workshops and Masterclass: As a special extension of the ART X ICON exhibition, photographer, archivist, and son of J.D. ’Okhai Ojeikere, Amaize Ojeikere, led The Masterclass, sponsored by Zenith Bank, with select participants receiving development grants.
- Installations: Notable commissions included MASS (Devotion) by Dennis Osadebe and Asoebi by Sokari Douglas Camp.
- Community and Family Engagement: The fair expanded its Schools’ Programme and Kids’ Tours, partnering with local schools and Teach for Nigeria to introduce over 750 children to art via tours and workshops.
- The fair continued its educational and developmental focus with The Development Forum and the return of ART X Talks, which this year featured film director Mati Diop, winner of the 2024 Berlin International Film Festival's Golden Bear. Another highlight of the ART X Talks programme was one in partnership with kó that brought together 4 great Nigerian artists - Nike Davies-Okundaye, Bruce Onabrakpeya, and Jimoh Buraimoh and was moderated by Jumoke Sanwo.

== The Access ART X Prize ==
The Access ART X Prize awards early-career artists from Africa and its Diaspora with opportunities to develop their practices, to set them up for the highest levels of success on the global stage.

In its initial iteration, the Prize was created to bolster the careers of emerging artists, after identifying the absence of infrastructure that exists for contemporary art within the country.

In 2022, the Prize platform evolved to include an additional award, and is now open to emerging artists from the rest of Africa and its Diaspora, in a bid to buttress sustainable careers for a wider range of artists.

The 2016 and 2017 editions of the Prize were won by Patrick Akpojotor and Habeeb Andu.

In 2018, Bolatito Aderemi-Ibitola, a multi-disciplinary artist, emerged as the winner, receiving a grant towards the execution of a solo presentation at the third edition of ART X Lagos, as well as a three-month residency at Gasworks London.

In 2019, the Prize was won by self-taught documentary photographer Etinosa Yvonne.

After a hiatus due to COVID-19, the Access Bank ART X Prize returned in 2021, with visual artist Chigozie Obi emerging as the winner.

In 2022, two winners were awarded. Dafe Oboro emerged as the winner of the Nigeria Award, with a generous grant towards a solo exhibition and a three-month residency at Gasworks London. Belinda Kazeem-Kaminiski won the Africa/Diaspora Award, with the same grant towards a solo exhibition and a three-month residency at Yinka Shonibare's GAS Foundation in Lagos.

In 2023, The Access ART X Prize 2022 winners each showcased a solo exhibition at the fair. Nigeria winner, Dafe Oboro presented "Odafe," and The Africa/ Diaspora winner, Belinda Kazeem-Kamiński's solo exhibition, was titled "Ire,"

The 2023 Prizewinners, Julius Agbaje (Nigerian winner) and Asmaa Jama (Africa/Diaspora winner) were awarded. Due to personal reasons, Jama had to withdraw from the Prize, with Shabu Mwangi — the artist recognized in the Prize's 2023 Honorable Mentions — assuming the position of the Access ART X Prize Africa/Diaspora Winner for 2023. Each winner received a $10,000 grant each towards an exhibition at ART X Lagos 2024. The Nigerian winner embarked on a three-month residency at Gasworks, London, while the African/Diasporan winner completes a residency at Yinka Shonibare's GAS Foundation in Lagos. Both recipients will benefit from tailored mentorship and an invaluable opportunity for cultural exchange.

The jury also recognized Roanna Tella in the Nigerian category for Honorable Mentions, who was awarded a cash prize along with personalized mentorship.
