= Atedo Peterside =

Nigerian banker and entrepreneur

Atedo N. A. Peterside CON
- Born: July 1955 (age 71)
- Education: The City University, London and London School of Economics and Political Science
- Occupations: Entrepreneur, investment banker, and economist
- Website: www.anapfoundation.com

Atedo Peterside CON (born in July 1955) is a Nigerian entrepreneur, investment banker, and economist. He is the founder of Stanbic IBTC Bank Plc, Anap Business Jets Limited (Anap Jets), and the Atedo N. A. Peterside Foundation (Anap Foundation).

== Education ==
Peterside had his secondary education at King's College Lagos. (He claimed in an interview about his life that he was admitted to King's College as a 10-year-old boy). He proceeded to The City University, London (1973–1976) where he obtained a B.Sc. degree in economics. He went on to obtain an M.Sc. (also in Economics) from the London School of Economics and Political Science in 1977. His executive education includes the Owner/President Management Program at the Harvard Business School from 1991 to 1993. He was conferred with an honorary Doctor of Science Degree by the University of Port Harcourt, Nigeria and was also elected an Honorary Fellow of the Chartered Institute of Stockbrokers on 1 April 2019.

== Career ==
Peterside founded the Investment Banking & Trust Company Limited (IBTC) in February 1989. He served as the Bank's CEO till 2007.

IBTC opted to comply with the Central Bank of Nigeria order in 2005 (that all commercial banks had to have a N25 billion minimum capital base) by raising more capital and also acquiring two commercial banks; Chartered Bank Plc and Regent Bank Plc, in order to become a universal bank on 19 December 2005. It then changed its name to IBTC Chartered Bank Plc.

On 24 September 2007, IBTC Chartered Bank Plc merged with Standard Bank Nigeria Limited to form Stanbic IBTC Bank Plc, and he was elected Chairman of Stanbic IBTC Bank in October 2007.

Peterside was Group Chairman of Stanbic IBTC Holdings Plc from August 2012. Having overseen a number of regulatory matters through to completion, he retired in 2017.

He is currently the Chairman of Anap Jets FZE which commenced business through Anap Business Jets Limited on 1 January 2015. He sat on the boards of both The Standard Bank of South Africa Limited and Standard Bank Group Limited between August 2014 and June 2024. He retired from both Boards on 10 June 2024.

He was a member of the National Economic Management Team (2007–2015), and member of the National Council on Privatization (2010–2015). Until 2020, Peterside sat on the Board of Directors of Flour Mills of Nigeria, Nigerian Breweries and Unilever Nigeria Plc. He was the Non-Executive Chairman of Cadbury Nigeria Plc from April 2010 till 30 June 2020. Peterside resigned from the Boards of all these quoted brands in Nigeria to focus more of his time on the work of Anap Foundation. He is a Non-executive director on the Board of ART X Collective Limited and also serves on the African Advisory Board of the Prince's Trust International. Between 2017 and 2023, he was the inaugural Chairman of Endeavour High Impact Entrepreneurship Ltd/Gte, a non-profit organization that provides mentorship and support to scale-up companies.

In May 2022, Peterside won the Lifetime Achievement Award for his contribution to banking at the African Banker Awards staged in Accra, Ghana by African Development Bank.

== Contribution to politics and public policy in Nigeria ==
Peterside has used his platform to comment on, or influence politics and public policy in Nigeria. He has also held various advisory roles to the government of Nigeria but never agreed to accept a full-time public sector appointment.

He was 1 of 3 Conveners of Concerned Professionals back in 1993 which was an attempt to make various professionals politically active in response to the annulment of June 12, 1993 elections and the fight for the restoration of democracy in Nigeria.

He was appointed the Chairman of the Committee on Corporate Governance of Public Companies in Nigeria. The Committee drafted the first Code of Best Practices for Public Companies operating in Nigeria, which was published in October 2003.

Between 2007 and 2010 and also between 2011 and 2015, he was a member of the National Economic Management Team.

Between 2007 and 2011, he was the honorary adviser to the Governor of Rivers State.

Between 2011 and 2015, he was on the National Council on Privatisation (NCP), and successfully oversaw the privatisation of the Nigerian power sector amongst other transactions. He was also the Chairman of the NCP's Technical Committee.

In January 2012, he made a case on national television for the removal of N1.3 trillion petrol subsidy when it was an unpopular position to take.

In early 2014 he was appointed a Federal Government of Nigeria Delegate to the National Conference which held in that year.

In March 2020, he declined an invitation to attend a forum being organized by Nigeria's Central Bank because he was not pleased by the dethronement and illegal exile/banishment of the Emir of Kano Muhammadu Sanusi II.

On 22 March 2020, Peterside set up the Anap Foundation COVID-19 Think Tank

In May 2020 he was named co-chairman (alongside the Finance Minister) of the Steering Committee for the new National Development Plan for Nigeria.

In September 2020, Peterside was appointed the co-chairman of the National Steering Committee for Agenda 2050 and the 2021 – 25 Development Plan that was inaugurated by President Buhari. At the inauguration, on 9 September 2020, he made some pertinent opening remarks at the televised Inaugural Meeting of the Steering Committee which held on that same day. The assignment ended when Buhari's tenure ended on 29 May 2023.

On 23 October 2020, Peterside appeared on Arise TV's Morning Show, where he was interviewed by a panel of three journalists regarding the aftermath of the #EndSARS and #EndPoliceBrutality protests. During the interview, he offered condolences to families who had lost relatives, criticised President Buhari's address to the nation of 22 October 2020, expressed concern over reports that authorities had attempted to freeze the bank accounts of protest supporters, and encouraged youth participation in the political process ahead of the 2023 elections.

=== The GoNigeria Initiative ===
GoNigeria is a non-profit, non-party movement dedicated to building a new voice for the young people in Nigeria. The initiative encourages Nigerian youths to become politically active and to register en-masse to vote in future elections. This began with the 2023 General Elections.

Peterside was the Convener of this Initiative which was launched by Anap Foundation in early December 2021, when he featured on an exclusive Arise TV interview on 7 December 2021; in a Question and Answer session with Charles Aniagolu, to explain the GoNigeria initiative.

The 18 initial Advocates of the GoNigeria Movement are drawn from all the 6 geopolitical zones (3 from each zone). They are: Atedo Peterside (Convener), ‘Yemi Adamolekun, Tomiwa Aladekomo, Osita Chidoka, Dike Chukwumerije, Folarin Falana (Falz), Kashim Ibrahim-Imam, Bishop Matthew Kukah, Hamzat Lawal, Nuruddeen Lemu, Ayisha Osori, Arunma Oteh, Muhammad Ali Pate, Dr. Tony Rapu, HH Muhammad Sanusi II, Dr. Salamatu Hussaini Suleiman, Ibrahim Dahiru Waziri and Aisha Yesufu.

Alongside the advocates, several well-known celebrities were also instrumental in amplifying the GoNigeria message. They include: Mr Macaroni, Mo Abudu, Kate Henshaw, Chigul, Onyeka Onwenu, Oluwatosin Olaseinde and Bovi.

To further boost the reach and impact of the campaign, several youth-targeted competitions were launched, where a cumulative of two million Naira per competition was doled out by Anap Foundation to participants who finished 1st, 2nd or 3rd. This began with the GoNigeria Poetry Challenge, where youths aged 18–45 who had their Personal Voters Card (PVCs) were tasked with creating a 30 seconds video encouraging other youths to register, pick up their PVCs and vote in the 2023 General Elections.

This was soon followed by the GoNigeria English Rap Challenge, the GoNigeria Pidgin Rap Challenge, the GoNigeria Comedy Challenge, the GoNigeria Hausa Rap Challenge and the GoNigeria Igbo Rap Challenge. Several youths across the 36 states of the country participated and many were motivated to register and follow-through to get their PVCs.

On 21 December 2022, Peterside made an appearance on a Channels Television program POLITICS TODAY, where he was interviewed by Seun Okinbaloye. In the interview, Mr. Peterside presented highlights of the 2nd Presidential Election Polls commissioned by Anap Foundation and which was carried out by NOIPolls. The Polls were inconclusive in terms of predicting an outright winner, but firmly established that fresh dynamics had emerged which pointed to a 3-horse race with Peter Obi, of the Labour Party Candidate, unexpectedly slugging it out with Bola Ahmed Tinubu of the ruling All Progressive Congress party and Alhaji Atiku Abubakar of the People Democratic Party (PDP), whilst Dr Rabiu Kwankwaso of the NNPP was a lone outsider.

On 14 March 2023, Peterside was interviewed by Arise TV's Charles Aniagolu. Peterside drew attention to the flaws in the electoral process which included apparently falsified Presidential Election Result Sheets which were uploaded on the INEC IREV Server. Peterside therefore argued that it was premature to congratulate the President-Elect, who emerged from a flawed and tainted process that was now the subject of Election Petitions from his two major opponents.

== Philanthropic work ==
Peterside founded the Anap Foundation, a non-profit organisation which aimed to promote good governance. He has been the President from inception in 2003.

=== Anap Foundation COVID-19 Think Tank ===
On 18 March 2020, Peterside appeared on Channels Television to warn Nigerians about the danger of complacency, listing four major reasons why Coronavirus disease may hit Nigeria harder than the rest of the world. The video was widely shared on social media. He has also called on the Nigerian government "to use various agencies at its disposal to enforce quarantine following the spread of COVID-19 in the country."

The Anap Foundation COVID-19 Think Tank was founded on 22 March 2020 to help Nigeria overcome the COVID-19 pandemic threat. It is composed of eighteen members from across the six geopolitical zones of Nigeria and the diaspora (USA & Germany). These are volunteers "with decades of expertise in medicine, logistics, e-commerce, economics, finance, law, communications, religious knowledge, academia, mobilization, advocacy, sustainability, governance, accountancy, actuarial science, health management organisations, grant making and international disaster management."

The Foundation has also released "Coronavirus Alert" in major Nigerian languages to alert the public to the issues facing the country with the pandemic.

On 4 February, the Anap Foundation COVID-19 Think Tank collaborated with Media Houses to launch a Name and Shame Initiative for violators of the COVID-19 safety protocols.

== National honours ==
In 2010, Peterside was awarded the Commander of the Order of the Niger (CON).

== Personal life ==
Atedo Peterside, the Arusibidabo of the Opobo Kingdom, is married to Mrs. Dudun Peterside (née Pearce). They have three children, Tokini, Atowari, and Tariye. Tokini Peterside is the founder of ART X Lagos.

His father Chief Michael Clement Atowari Peterside (Sunju IX), who lived from 24 June 1918 to 15 January 2016, was an Ophthalmologist and a retired Controller of Medical Services in the Old Rivers State. He held the Nigerian chieftaincy title of the head chief of the Sunju Peterside chieftaincy family of Opobo. At his death, the chief was 97.

Peterside's mother is Patricia Awune Gboloba Bob-Manuel. At the time of her marriage, she was a princess of the royal family of Abonnema.

Peterside lists his hobbies as boating, polo, reading, and traveling.
