= Tokini Peterside =

Nigerian entrepreneur and business woman

Tokini Peterside-Schwebig
- Born: Tokini Peterside
- Education: INSEAD, London School of Economics
- Occupation: Entrepreneur
- Organization: ART X Lagos
- Website: www.artxlagos.com

Tokini Peterside-Schwebig is a Nigerian entrepreneur, business woman and art collector. She is the founder of ART X Collective, a cultural management company in Lagos, Nigeria. The company's flagship fair, ART X Lagos, is the leading international art fair in West Africa.

== Early life and education ==
From Rivers State, born in Lagos, Nigeria, as the daughter of the banker Atedo Peterside and his wife Dundun (née Pearce), Peterside grew up between Nigeria and the United Kingdom, where she studied at Cheltenham Ladies' College and Westminster School. She graduated with a First Class honours degree in law from the London School of Economics and Political Science. In 2015, she attended the business school, INSEAD, where she obtained a Master of Business Administration (MBA), and lived between France and Singapore. Through her father, she is a granddaughter of the Nigerian traditional aristocrats Chief M.C.A. Peterside of Opobo and Princess Patricia Bob-Manuel of Abonnema.

== Career ==
After graduation from university, Peterside embarked on a career in marketing, and subsequently became Head of Marketing at Moët Hennessy, part of LVMH, in Nigeria.

She founded her company in 2012, and provided strategy, business planning and marketing consulting to luxury and culture businesses in Nigeria, such as ALARA, the David Adjaye-designed luxury concept store; Maki Oh, a luxury fashion designer; and the Executive Producers of Half of a Yellow Sun, the film based on Chimamanda Adichie’s novel, which starred Thandie Newton, Chiwetel Ejiofor and John Boyega.

=== Art X Lagos ===
In 2016, Peterside launched ART X Lagos, the leading international art fair in West Africa. Since its debut, ART X Lagos has attracted thousands of local and international visitors to experience the works of the most promising artists from across Africa and its Diaspora. The fair has been described as "West Africa's calling card for contemporary African art fairs" and has featured exhibiting artists and speakers such as El Anatsui, Yinka Shonibare, Njideka Akunyili-Crosby, Wangechi Mutu, Bruce Onobrakpeya, Barthelemy Togou, Nastio Mosquito, Godfried Donkor, Zanele Muholi, Nandipha Mntambo, Victor Ehikhamenor, James Barnor, Olu Amoda, Wura-Natasha Ogunji, Modupeola Fadugba, among others.

Committed to the growth and development of the African cultural and creative industries, Peterside-Schwebig has also launched additional platforms to support emerging African talent: ART X Live! - a dynamic showcase and accelerator for musicians and artists, and the ART X Prize - an annual art award and development program for emerging artists in Africa and its Diaspora.

In July 2018, Peterside led the visiting French President Emmanuel Macron through a special exhibition by ART X Lagos, of contemporary Nigerian art, as part of the 'Celebration of African Culture' hosted at the New Afrika Shrine in Lagos, to launch the African Cultural Season scheduled to hold in France in 2020.

On August 18, 2018, Peterside spoke alongside other noteworthy speakers, to a sold-out audience during the TEDxLagos spotlight event at the Muson Centre. She shared the stage with legal practitioner Supo Shasore, multidisciplinary designer Ade Olufeko, olympian Simidele Adeagbo and media personality Banky W. amongst others.

In November 2025, Tokini Peterside-Schwebig led ART X Lagos through its landmark tenth edition, marking a decade of commitment to contemporary African creativity, and showing Lagos to be an increasingly essential hub in the international art world.

== Awards and recognition ==
- In 2022. Peterside-Schwebig was named to the 100 Most Influential Africans 2022 list by New African Magazine.
- In 2020, Peterside was included in Apollo magazine's 40 Under 40 list.
- In 2019 Peterside was named on Fast Company's 100 Most Creative People in Business list.
- In 2018, she was listed as part of the Quartz Africa Innovators 2018: A list of the continent's Top 30 pioneers.
- In 2017, she was named to the MIPAD 100, a list of the Most Influential People of African Descent under the age of 40, an initiative in support of the United Nations’ International Decade for People of African Descent.
- In 2017, she was named Her Network Woman of the Year in the Arts Category.
- In 2011, Peterside was named "Corporate Professional of the Year" at the Future Awards Africa.
