= Patrick Eugène =

Haitian-American painter

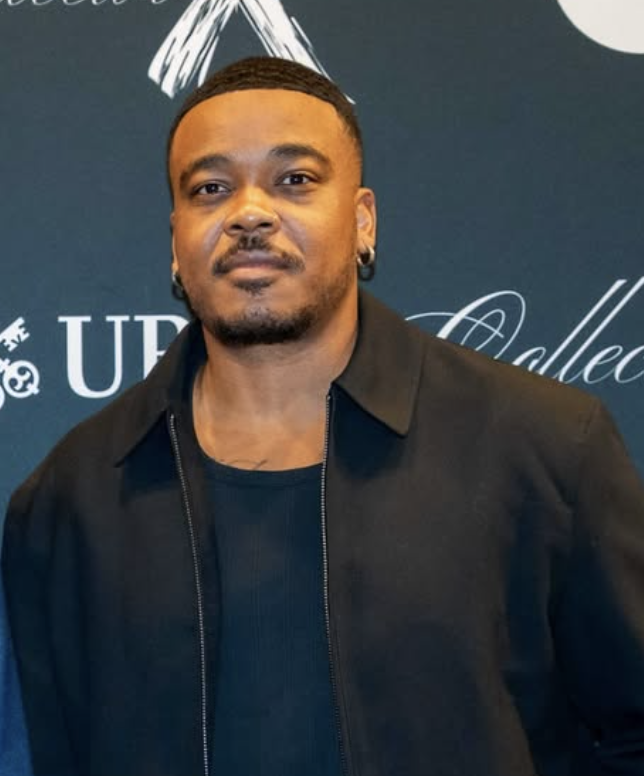
- Born: 1984 (age 41–42); Brooklyn, New York, U.S.
- Education: Self-taught
- Years active: 2011–present
- Known for: Painting
- Notable work: Deconstruction; Where Do We Go from Here?; 50 lbs.; Solitude
- Movement: Contemporary art; figurative painting

Patrick Eugène (born 1984) is an American painter of Haitian descent. His work depicts figures in domestic and social settings and addresses themes related to Haitian and Haitian-American life. Eugène is self-taught and has described a process that emphasizes intuition and working without traditional sitters or reference images. He lives and works in Atlanta, Georgia.

== Early life and education ==
Eugène was born in Brooklyn, New York, and grew up in New York City as the child of Haitian immigrant parents. He has stated that he grew up surrounded by Haitian art and music in his family home, which later informed his use of color, rhythm, and visual motifs.

He has no formal art training. Eugène has said he began drawing and painting at age 27 after years of working in non-art jobs, including finance, and after earlier involvement in music production and songwriting as a parallel creative outlet. He has also discussed making repeated trips to Haiti beginning after the 2010 earthquake, experiences he has described as shaping his perspective on heritage, resilience, and diaspora identity.

== Career ==
=== Early practice and abstract work (2011–2019) ===
Eugène’s early career developed through experimentation with abstraction and mixed-media approaches. In a 2016 interview, he described beginning to paint while working as a financial adviser and using painting as a way to manage stress, later committing more fully to the practice as his work drew attention.

In 2016, Eugène presented his first solo exhibition, Deconstruction, at Brooklyn Arts Fellowship (BAF Gallery) in Brooklyn, New York. The show focused on gentrification in East New York, the neighborhood where he grew up and maintained a studio at the time. Gothamist reported that the exhibition included approximately 15 works—paintings, sculpture, and drawings—and that Eugène incorporated materials sourced from nearby construction sites, connecting his process to the physical transformation of the neighborhood. Works referenced in coverage of the series included Affordable, Negro Removal, 2016, and Sorry I Stole Your Garden.

=== Series informed by travel and diaspora themes (2019–2020) ===
By the late 2010s, Eugène’s work increasingly incorporated figurative elements alongside gestural abstraction. Artsy linked Eugène’s Moun series (2019–20) to his trips to Haiti and to parallels he drew between Haitian political unrest and U.S. racial justice protests. In related coverage, Artsy noted that Eugène connected material choices in specific works to memories of Haiti after the 2010 earthquake, including streets filled with broken concrete.

=== Figurative work and Gallery 1957 (2020–2021) ===
Eugène participated in the Legacy Brothers Lab residency in Chicago in 2020. Around this period he exhibited with Gallery 1957 in Accra, Ghana.

In 2021, Gallery 1957 presented Eugène’s solo exhibition Where Do We Go from Here? in Accra. Eugène noted that the exhibition title drew from the book Where Do We Go from Here: Chaos or Community? by Martin Luther King Jr. Gallery 1957 stated that the series transposed imagery drawn from vintage photography of Black artists into composite portraits and referenced the expressionism of West African masks, rendered in saturated color palettes associated with Haitian carnival.

=== Mariane Ibrahim Gallery (2022–present) ===
In late 2022, Mariane Ibrahim presented Cinematic Expressions, a dual exhibition in Paris featuring new work by Eugène and Ziad Kaki. In 2023, the gallery announced global representation of Eugène.

From April to May 2023, Mariane Ibrahim presented Eugène’s solo exhibition 50 lbs. in Chicago. The exhibition title referred to common airline luggage weight limits and used that constraint as a framework to consider migration and the experience of carrying personal history across borders.

In 2024, Mariane Ibrahim presented Eugène’s solo exhibition Solitude in Paris (February 17–March 23, 2024). Cultured described the series as exploring solitude across a spectrum from loneliness to self-awareness, with a palette moving from cyan to deep navy and a mix of gloss and matte finishes.

In February 2025, Mariane Ibrahim presented a solo booth of Eugène’s work at Frieze Los Angeles. Frieze highlighted themes in the artist’s recent work including migration, solitude, and family, and noted Eugène’s tendency to detach scenes from specific locations as a way to encourage viewer interpretation.

=== Dior Lady Art project (2025) ===
In 2025, Eugène was selected as one of ten artists participating in Dior’s 10th-anniversary Dior Lady Art project, which invites contemporary artists to reinterpret the Lady Dior handbag design. His three handbags, titled The Pearl of the Antilles, referenced Haiti’s historical nickname “La Perle des Antilles” and incorporated materials such as raffia and a pearl charm to evoke Haitian craft traditions and the project’s theme. The Atlanta Journal-Constitution reported that Dior developed the bags from three conceptual sketches Eugène sent for the brand’s three handbag sizes, and that the pearl element was intended as a deliberate reference to the term’s colonial history.

== Artistic style and themes ==
=== Process and technique ===
Eugène has described an intuitive, meditative working process that avoids direct reliance on reference photographs or sitters. He has said he begins with accumulated impressions and then allows figures and scenes to emerge during the act of painting, emphasizing spontaneity and emotional tone over portrait likeness.

In a 2025 profile, Eugène described working on raw, unprimed canvas and physically “scrubbing” paint into the surface, using both brush and rag to saturate the material and retain an association with the bodily energy of his earlier abstract work.

=== Subject matter and motifs ===
Eugène’s paintings often depict solitary or small groups of figures in minimally specified interiors or social spaces, a strategy he has linked to leaving interpretive space for viewers and encouraging narrative projection. His themes have included gentrification and neighborhood transformation (Deconstruction), migration and family history (50 lbs.), and the emotional complexity of isolation and introspection (Solitude).

== Reception ==
Coverage of Eugène’s work has appeared in art and culture publications and mainstream media. My Modern Met emphasized the hybrid quality of his paintings between figuration and abstraction and highlighted his self-taught trajectory and reliance on spontaneous construction of images. Frieze identified his work as a standout solo presentation at Frieze Los Angeles, noting themes of migration, solitude, and family and describing his scenes as intentionally untethered from specific settings. Whitewall discussed his 2021 body of work Letters to an Artist: In Search of the Creative Self in relation to his interest in earlier cultural movements such as the Harlem Renaissance.

== Selected exhibitions ==
=== Solo exhibitions ===
- 2016: Deconstruction, BAF Gallery (Brooklyn Arts Fellowship), Brooklyn, New York
- 2021: Where Do We Go From Here, Gallery 1957, Accra, Ghana
- 2023: 50 lbs., Mariane Ibrahim, Chicago, Illinois
- 2024: Solitude, Mariane Ibrahim, Paris, France

=== Selected group exhibitions and fairs ===
- 2022–2023: Cinematic Expressions (with Ziad Kaki), Mariane Ibrahim, Paris, France
- 2024: Mariane Ibrahim at Art Basel Paris, Paris, France
- 2025: Mariane Ibrahim at Frieze Los Angeles (solo presentation), Los Angeles, California

== Collections and commissions ==
According to a Mariane Ibrahim CV, Eugène’s work is held in the collections of the Mead Art Museum (Amherst College) and the Dean Collection (New York). A Gallery 1957 CV also lists commissions including a public art commission associated with the Mead Art Museum and Amherst College, as well as commercial commissions for Nike (Lunarcharge release) and a project for Travellers Beach Resort in Negril, Jamaica.
