= Osinachi =

- Pronunciation: /ɔːsiːnətʃiː/
- Gender: Unisex
- Language: Igbo

Origin
- Origin: Nigeria
- Meaning: It came from chi
- Region of origin: Southeast Nigeria

Osinachi // is a unisex given name of Igbo origin that means “it came from chi.”

Gloss:

Ọ - it

si na - came from

chi

== Notable bearers ==
- Osinachi Egbu (born 30 March 1972), Nigerian singer, songwriter, and senior worship leader
- Osinachi Christian Ebere (born 4 April 1998), Nigerian footballer
- "Osinachi", single by Humble Smith
- Osinachi (born 1991), Nigerian visual and digital artist
- Osinachi Ohale (born 21 December 1991), Nigerian footballer
- Osinachi Nwachukwu (12 November 1979 – 8 April 2022), Nigerian Gospel singer
