= James Hayward =

James Hayward may refer to:

- James Hayward (writer) (born 1966), English writer on military, art and music history
- James Hayward (artist) (1943–2026), American painter
- James Hayward (politician) (born 1969/1970), former member of the Western Australian Legislative Council
- Jimmy Hayward (born 1970), film director, screenwriter and animator
