= Kadara Enyeasi =

Nigerian fine art photographer

Kadara Enyeasi is a Nigerian fine art photographer.

== Career ==
Kadara started taking photographs of close family as a teenager in high school with a 2-megapixel Nikon camera. He graduated from the University of Lagos with a major in architecture.

His work has featured on the Lagos Photo Festival in 2015 and 2017. His work is featured in the Zeitz MOCAA exhibition, Still Here Tomorrow To High Five You Yesterday (2019). His work was curated as part of the collection that was exhibited at the maiden Art X Lagos in 2016. His work has appeared on CNN, Vogue and at Foam X African Artists’ Foundation by the Foam Fotografiemuseum.

He was nominated for the Edwin George Prize for Photography at the Future Awards Africa 2017.
