= Zohra Opoku =

German/Ghanaian textile artist

- Born: 1976 (age 49–50); Altdöbern, Germany
- Occupation: Visual artist
- Known for: Textile artist, photographer

Zohra Opoku (born 1976) is a German-born Ghanaian textile artist and photographer. She used textile patterns to inform her photographed portraits. She was born in Altdöbern, Germany, and she lives in Accra. She is known for her installations, performances, textile designs, photographs and videos.

== Biography ==
Opoku was born in 1976 in Altdöbern in East Germany and her father of Ghanaian origin died when she was a child. She was raised in part by her maternal grandparents. She then knew little about her African origins, her mother hesitant to give free rein to stories on this subject, being the subject of surveillance in East Germany following her relationship with a Ghanaian man and the paranoia in this regime about non-standard elements. However, she and her family benefited from the fall of the Berlin Wall in 1989. Zohra Opoku was then able to pursue higher education in Hamburg, in the field of fashion and design. Then, still in Europe, she worked in clothing with the Danish designer Henrick Vibskov, before devoting herself entirely to her own artistic creations. The Victoria and Albert Museum (V&A) in London presented some of his works in an exhibition entitled Black Style in. But his training and this prior career in the fashion and clothing industry will mark his later creations.

In 2011, she returned to Ghana, her father's country, and settled in Accra. In 2014, several installations in different places in Accra including the Alliance Française, as part of a project called Who is wearing my T-Shirt -The Billboard Project, were noticed. She wanted to highlight the incongruous effects of the importation of second-hand Western clothing into Africa. The idea for these installations was born from a vision a few years earlier in a village in Ghana of a young man wearing a T-shirt glorifying FC Hansa Rostock, an infamous football club from the former GDR. in Germany for the racist insults made at the time by his supporters. For her, the clothes worn demonstrate the links that each person wishes to establish with their own culture.

Then, from 2017, it was a Chicago gallery run by Mariane Ibrahim which allowed her to be present in other international artistic events. One of the first joint exhibitions, the installation Unraveled Threads, at one of the best-known New York contemporary art fairs, The Armory Show, was awarded an award. Mariane Ibrahim then presented works by Zohra Opoku in various exhibitions or festivals, such as EXPO Chicago, or even Paris Photo, in addition to the Dakar Bienna. The installation also corresponds to a search for identity and a family story, with deliberately blurred portraits of his father and other members of his family screen-printed on kente fabrics: “It has this blurred effect of images and memories, to show how we are connected to our own imagination and memories. “It’s a collage of information and stories – from my father, but also from my brothers and sisters,” she explains. Some of his works are also included in the inaugural exhibition, of a new gallery by Mariane Ibrahim in Paris, in 2021, entitled J'ai deux Amours..

== Artistic practice and themes ==
Opoku’s work examines personal and collective identity, memory, and cultural belonging, drawing on her experiences between Europe and West Africa. Her practice is grounded in photography and textiles, and often begins with photographic images that are screen-printed onto dyed natural fabrics, which she then transforms through embroidery, collage, and installation techniques.

Textile materials, including fabrics sourced from local markets and family heirlooms, play a central role in her work and function as carriers of personal and cultural histories. Opoku’s imagery frequently incorporates her own body, family photographs, and symbols from Ghana’s visual culture, exploring how garments and patterns record and reflect questions of belonging, memory, and representation.

Her use of textiles reflects broader historical and socio-economic influences on identity, such as the meanings embedded in traditional Ghanaian dress codes and fabric culture. This approach appears across her installations, photography, and mixed-media works, positioning cloth as both material and conceptual medium for investigating how histories and personal narratives are woven together.

== Selected exhibitions ==
=== Personal ===
- 2013: Post No Bill, Jamestown Community Theater Centre, Accra, Ghana
- 2014: The Billboard Project, Public art exhibition, Accra, Ghana
- 2016: Sassa, Gallery 1957
- 2016: Draped Histories, Kruger Gallery, Chicago
- 2017: Unraveled Thread, The Armory Show
- 2018: Harmattan Tales, Art Dubai
- 2019: Unraveled Threads, Paris Photo
- 2022: I Have Arisen…, Mariane Ibrahim, Chicago
- 2023: I Have Arisen…Part 2, Mariane Ibrahim, Paris
- 2024: PLATFORM 33: Zohra Opoku, Self-Portraits, DeCordova Sculpture Park and Museum
- 2025: We Proceed in the Footsteps of the Sunlight, Zeitz Museum of Contemporary Art Africa

=== Collective ===
- 2007: Black Style, Victoria and Albert Museum, London
- 2014: Words of Women, Alliance Française, Accra, Ghana
- 2014: Dakar Biennale, Senegal
- 2015: FAVT: Future Africa - Visions In Time, Iwalewahaus, Bayreuth, Germany
- 2015: Making Africa,, Vitra Design Museum, Weil am Rhein, Germany/Guggenheim Museum, Bilbao, Spain
- 2016: Making Africa, Center de Cultura Contemporània de Barcelona (CCCB), Barcelona, Spain
- 2016: 1:54 Contemporary African Art Fair, New York
- 2017: Making Africa, High Museum of Art, Atlanta
- 2017: FAVT, Goethe Institute, Johannesburg, South Africa/Nairobi National Museum, Nairobi, Kenya
- 2019: Treasures of Islam: from Timbuktu to Zanzibar, Mohammed VI Museum of Modern and Contemporary Art, Rabat, Morocco
- 2019: EXPO Chicago, Mariane Ibrahim Gallery, Chicago
- 2020: Dakar Biennale, Senegal
- 2021: I have two Loves..., Mariane Ibrahim Gallery, Paris, France

== Bibliography ==
- Cascone, Sarah (March 3, 2017). "Mariane Ibrahim Wins Armory Show's First 'Presents' Prize". Artnet News.
- Embuscado, Rain; Chu, Christie (May 6, 2016). "The Best of 1:54 Contemporary African Art Fair - artnet News". Artnet News.
- Kaplan, Isaac (March 2, 2017). "Mariane Ibrahim Gallery Wins The Armory Show Booth Prize". Artsy.
- Mercer, Amirah (March 2, 2017). "'Unraveled Threads': Ghanaian Artist Zohra Opoku's Latest Work Focuses On Kente & Identity". OkayAfrica. Archived from the original on September 27, 2017.
- "The art of Ghana". Financial Times.
- "Young Seattle gallery wins first $10,000 Presents prize at The Armory Show".
