= Ranti Bam =

British-Nigerian artist (born 1982)

- Born: Lagos, Nigeria
- Education: City Lit, London; School of Art, Architecture and Design (formerly The Cass), London
- Known for: Ceramics, Sculpture
- Website: INFO -- Ranti Bam

Ranti Bam (born 1982) is a British-Nigerian artist from London and Lagos known for her colourful and sculptural ceramics works made with a variety of clay techniques.

== Early life and education ==
Ranti Bam was born in Lagos, Nigeria and raised in London. She received an MA at the School of Art, Architecture and Design in London (formerly The Cass), traveled widely, and lived in Greece. Later, she studied ceramics at City Lit, London.

Bam has said she was awakened to the possibility of making art in clay after visiting the Africa Remix exhibit at the Hayward Gallery in London: "It was like an opening of my third-eye," she told an interviewer for Ceramic Review, "For the first time I was seeing contemporary work made by African artists."

== Career ==
After completing her Fine and Applied Arts course in ceramics at City Lit, Bam has exhibited her work in group and solo exhibitions in Europe, North America, and Africa.

In 2017, the director of the London gallery 50 Golborne, Pascale Revert, invited Bam to exhibit her ceramics at the U.K. Crafts Council's annual Collect exhibition for the first time; her work was so successful there it was exhibited at Collect for three years in a row. 50 Golborne has also exhibited her work in their booth at the Contemporary African Art Fair in Paris. In 2018, she participated in curator Bisi Silva's group show The Gallery of Small Things in Senegal.

Bam has held residencies at Moly-Sabata in Sablons, France; Catinca Tabacaru Gallery in Harare, Zimbabwe; and the Cité Internationale des Arts in Paris, France, where she spent much of the COVID-19 pandemic.

Her work is held in the permanent collections of the V&A and the Brooklyn Museum. Through her artistic practice and residencies, and by teaching workshops and interactive sessions, particularly those with members of disenfranchised communities and feminist activists, Bam continues to explore the formal possibilities of clay and the socially engaged aspects of her practice.

== Collections ==
- Brooklyn Museum Brooklyn, NY, USA (Antafi, 2019)
- Victoria and Albert Museum, London, England.
- Chazen Museum of Art, Madison, WI, USA
