= Ndidi Dike =

Nigerian artist

Ndidi Dike was born in 1960 in London. She is a Nigeria-based visual artist working in sculpture and mixed-media painting. She is one of Nigeria's leading female artists, working in an artistic world typically designed for men. She is from Amaokwe Item in Bende local government of Abia State. She has three living sisters.

== Biography ==
Ndidi Dike first became interested in art as a very young child taking art classes in primary school. She completed her secondary education in England, and further explored her creativity in interdisciplinary art classes. "I loved the sense of freedom of interpretation, of exploring different media and I always felt a sense of peace during creative processes and so existed in a world of my own."

She graduated from the University of Nigeria, Nsukka (UNN), located in Enugu State, southeastern region of Nigeria with a Diploma in Music Education (voice), followed by a B.A in Fine and Applied Arts in 1984 where she majored in mixed media painting. She studied under other well known artists, like Uche Okeke and Obiora Udechukwu. After her mandatory year in the National Youth Service, Dike made the choice of becoming a professional studio artist in her home of Owerri, the capital city Imo State, southeast Nigeria. The artwork she created while in service was the majority of work she put in her first solo exhibition, titled "Mixed Media Expose, 1986."

Dike is a member of the Guild of Fine Arts, Nigeria (GFAN), the Society of Nigerian Artists (SNA), and the Royal Society of Sculptors, London.

== Background ==
Ndidi Dike uses her artistic ability to address and approach serious topics like slavery and colonialism, and the historical and continued impact of the Trans-Atlantic slave trade. She makes use of mixed-media and months of research to create her pieces.This effort has also been extended into closely related topics like that of value, of both material goods and human life, that she has created recent exhibition pieces about. The topics that she addresses in each of her pieces inform the mixed-media objects she chooses to include for a piece.

Dike's focus on such topics is intrinsically related to her own identity as Nigerian, even though she was born in London. She emphasizes the ways in which centuries of oppression and oppressive ideology have led to confusion and war in the African continent, stemming from issues of economy, the social world, or politics.

She also covers subjects like gender inequality and patriarchy.

Her presence in the Nigerian contemporary art world has been discussed as distinctly unique because of the way in which she has mixed historically used aspects of African art with modern-day techniques.

== Exhibitions ==
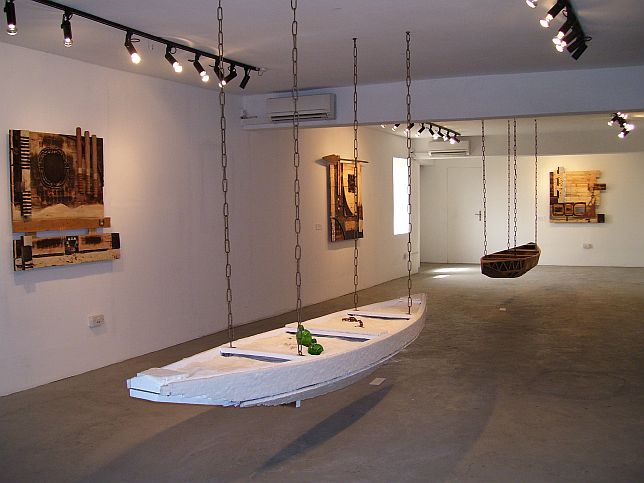
Waka-into-Bondage: The Last ¾ Mile, 2008.

Dike had ten solo exhibitions between 1986 and 2002; and 57 group exhibitions between 1986 and 2005. She has participated in exhibitions in Nigeria, Africa, and internationally. Among these exhibitions are Women to Women, Weaving Cultures, Shaping History (2000), University Art Gallery, Indiana State University; Totems and Signpost, (2002), Goethe Institute, Lagos (solo), Seven Stories about Modern Art in Africa (1995), in Whitechapel Gallery, London. She had two solo exhibitions in Lagos in 2008, which include Tapestry of Life: New Beginnings at the National Museum; and Waka-into-Bondage: The Last ¾ Mile for CCA. Waka-into-Bondage was curated by Bisi Silva. This exhibition commemorated the 200th anniversary of the abolition of slave trading, which was ignored within the cultural calendar of Nigeria. Through her works in Waka-into-Bondage, Ndidi Dike sought to keep alive the memory of the epochal matter that led to the capture, enslavement, killing or death of some 21 million Africans.

In a conversation with curator Bisi Silva about this exhibition, Dike said: "I visited Badagry in 2002 to see the slave route through which large numbers of our people were sent to the Americas to work daily, for long hours on plantations under subhuman conditions. During that visit, I knew I was standing face to face with history. Yet, much as I wanted to go back sooner, it only happened in 2007 at which point I knew I wanted to capture in a dramatic visual form this cataclysmic episode in human history. No-one can visit Badagry without being moved by this ignoble part of our history or by the consequences of man’s inhumanity." Dike’s experimentation with form led to the sculptural offering "Dwellings, Doors and Windows" in which she appropriated harbour pallets; she then broke them down to reconfigure the materials in a manner that evoked the Middle Passage. Blood is a striking motif of the sculpture, and Dike explains: "The blood represents what was shed before, during and after the Trans-Atlantic trade, but also what continues to be shed today." –

Although slavery is no longer legal anywhere in the world, human trafficking remains an international problem and an estimated 29.8 million persons are living in illegal slavery today. In modern times, the trading of children has been reported in modern Nigeria. Dike announced in an interview after her 2008 exhibition that she aimed to further explore this issue in her future works: "As I stated earlier, slave trading may have been abolished by the British parliament 200 years ago, but it is still in practice in certain countries. There are so many countries where the condition of the Black people leaves much to be desired. These new forms of slavery are not yet captured in the current works. I hope to reflect them soon in another set of works."

Her addition to the 2023 exhibition Lagos, Peckham, Repeat: Pilgrimage to the Lakes in London's South London Gallery was an installation built to represent the history of Lagos, both the good and the bad. This installation covers topics of material goods, places, and people to showcase the ways in which all of them are pitted against each other in the competition of what is valued. It questions the audience's understanding of Lagos, of their own individual values, and of international values. The piece follows her typical mixed-media style, but also challenges the way in which 2D and 3D objects can work together.

More recent exhibitions include Unknown Pleasures and Competing Tendencies; National Museum Onikan, Lagos (2012); Biennale Jogja XIII Hacking Conflict Indonesia meets Nigeria (2015); State Of The Nation, new works and installations, National Museum Onikan, Lagos (2016); Constellations: Floating Space, Motion and Remembrance, Iwalewahaus Bayreuth, Germany (2017); In The Guise of Resource Control, VillaVasslieff, Paris (2017); Ex-Africa, Centro Cultural Banco do Brasil (2017–2018); Belo Horizonte Brasil: Vanishing Voices 11th Bienal do Mercosul, Porto Alegre Brazil (2018); Dakart Biennale (2018); Feedback: Art, Africa and the 1980s, Iwalewahaus (2018); Prince/sses Of The City, Palais de Tokyo (2019); Lagos Biennial at Independence House, Lagos (2019); Lagos, Peckham, Repeat: Pilgrimage to the Lakes, South London Gallery, London (2023).

Dike's career includes international residencies such as Ragdale Foundation (Lake Forest, Illinois, USA), Yorkshire Sculpture Park (UK), TENQ in Senegal, Africa '95 programme, Gasworks (London), Jogja Biennale XIII: Hacking Conflict 2015 (Indonesia), Iwalewahaus (Bayreuth, Germany 2018), Villa Vasilieff Penord Ricard Fellow in 2017 (Paris), Tate Modern (London).

Dike's work is in public and private collections in Nigeria and abroad.

In 2022, her first artist monographic book titled "Discomfort Zones" was published, which gives a broad overview on her artistic career. It details the specifics of pieces she created, balanced out by the addition of text and curatorial statements. The book was published by Iwalewabooks.

== Bibliography ==
- Olu Oguibe, 8 African Women Artists – Savannah Gallery of Modern African Art, London, 1993.
- Catherine King : Views of Difference: Different Views of Art – Yale University Press in association with the Open University, 1999. ISBN 0-300-07764-5
- Bobin, Virginie et Bouteloup Mélanie, Ndidi Dike, Sous couvert du contrôle des ressources – in the guise of resource control, Paris, Villa Vassilieff – FNAGP Fondation Nationale des Arts Graphiques et Plastiques, 2018
- Anikulapo Jahman (ed.), Ndidi Dike: tapestry of life: new beginnings, exhibition paintings and sculpture, National Museum, Lagos, 2008
