= Roberts Projects =

Contemporary Art Gallery in Los Angeles, CA

Coordinates: 34.0656°N 118.3439°W

- Company type: Private
- Industry: Arts
- Predecessor: Roberts & Tilton
- Founded: 1999
- Founder: Bennett Roberts, Julie Roberts, Jack Tilton
- Headquarters: Los Angeles, California

Roberts Projects is a contemporary art gallery located in Los Angeles.

== History ==
Roberts Projects was founded in 1999 as Roberts & Tilton by partners Bennett Roberts, Julie Roberts and Jack Tilton in Los Angeles. Following the death of Jack Tilton (1951– 2017), the gallery changed its name to Roberts Projects on January 1, 2018.

Roberts & Tilton opened its first space in 2000 at the 6150 Wilshire gallery complex located in the Miracle Mile section of LA, a focal place for viewing art in the early 2000's. From 2008 through 2022 Roberts Projects occupied a former coffee-roasting factory in Culver City.

In August 2020, Roberts Projects was elected as a member of the Art Dealers Association of America.

Roberts Projects relocated in January 2023 to 442 South La Brea Avenue, renovating a 10,000 square foot historic automobile showroom space that was once a Max Barish car dealership. The space features four exhibition spaces, a bookshop, and a permanent site-specific space conceived by artist Betye Saar.

The building was originally erected in 1948 as the Max Barish Chrysler-Plymouth dealership, "Auto Dealer to the Stars" where Fred Astaire, Lucille Ball, Cary Grant, Bob Hope and Michael Landon bought their automobiles.

The architectural conversion was realized by the firm of Johnston Marklee which designed Roberts Projects' Culver City location in 2008.

== Notable exhibitions ==
- Kehinde Wiley, Colorful Realm, 2023. Roberts Projects was the first gallery on the westcoast to show artist Keginde Wiley.
- Betye Saar, Black Doll Blues, 2021.
- Amoako Boafo, SINGULAR DUALITY: ME CAN MAKE WE, 2021.
- Amoako Boafo, I See Me, 2018.
- L.A. Object and David Hammons Body Prints, 2007.
- Bliss featuring Noah Davis, 2007
- Kehinde Wiley Pictures at an Exhibition, 2003.

== Artists ==
The gallery represents various artists such as:

- Amoako Boafo
- Jeffrey Gibson
- Eberhard Havekost
- James Hayward
- Betye Saar
- Ed Templeton
- Kehinde Wiley
