= Christian Furr =

English painter

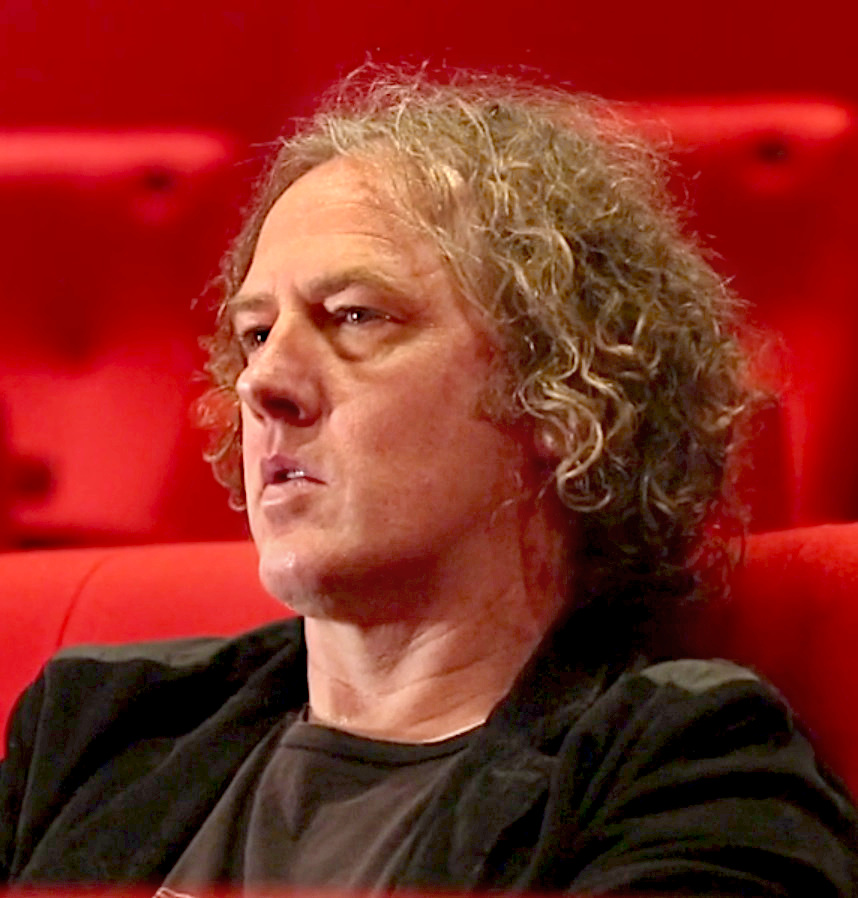
- Christian Furr, Jouissance February 2016
- Born: 1966 (age 59–60); Heswall, Cheshire, England
- Known for: Painting
- Spouse: Emma Furr
- Website: christianfurr.com

Christian Furr (born 1966) is an English painter. In 1995 he was commissioned to paint Queen Elizabeth II.

== Education ==
Furr was educated at Ladymount Primary School, Heswall, and St Anselm's College, Birkenhead. He later did a foundation course at Wirral Metropolitan College, and a Fine Art degree at De Montfort University.

== Career ==
In 1995, at the age of 28, he was commissioned by the Royal Overseas League to paint Queen Elizabeth II. The Queen chose Furr from among a number of artists, and the portrait was painted at Buckingham Palace. The portrait hangs on permanent display at the Royal Overseas League headquarters in London and is viewable by the public. In 2002, Furr painted Cardinal Cormac Murphy-O'Connor for Westminster Cathedral along with Bishop Patrick O'Donoghue and Bishop George Stack.

In 2005, Britvic commissioned Furr to create a painting marking 70 years of Robinsons (drink) the Wimbledon Championships on Centre Court. The giant canvas featuring Tim Henman and Fred Perry was completed by over one thousand people at Wimbledon. The original hangs at britvic headquarters, UK. In 2008, he was commissioned to paint Sultan, Crown Prince of Saudi Arabia.

In 2010, with the chairman, Furr presented The Duke of Edinburgh with a print of his portrait of the Queen, at the Eccentric Club. In November 2012, Furr was artist and curator in the art exhibition "Liverpool Love" at the new Museum of Liverpool in aid of Claire House Hospice. The exhibition included works by Yoko Ono, Sir Peter Blake David Mach, and many respected artists from the art and music scene.

In 2013 Furr had a show of neon artworks created with the late Chris Bracey. entitled 'The Staying Alive Neon Collection'.

In 2014, he was appointed to the Artists' General Benevolent Institution 'AGBI', the oldest charity in Great Britain, and was founded by J. M. W. Turner. Furr completed a portrait of Thomas van Straubenzee and Lady Melissa Percy, unveiled this year at the Chelsea Arts Club.

In 2015, he was elected to become a fellow of the Royal Society of Arts His work features in prominent collections globally including 45 Park Lane the Dorchester Collection.

In 2016, Furr initiated media attention when he expressed concern that the artist Anish Kapoor had gained the exclusive rights to Vantablack, known as 'the blackest black'. Furr had planned to use Vantablack in a series of paintings called Animals, after seeing a feature on the BBC.

In 2017, Furr collaborated with American-Ivorian contemporary artist Aboudia (Abdoulaye Diarrassouba), producing works between New York, London and Abidjan.

In 2017, Furr collaborated with English photographer Gered Mankowitz on the '45RPM' collection, which included artistic re renderings of Mankowitz's photographic archive and included paintings of The Rolling Stones, Kate Bush, Jimi Hendrix, and Marianne Faithfull. Furr's collection of cheese paintings begun in 2005, was featured on BBC Culture in 2017.

In 2018, Furr launched a new super-black he initiated at the Science Museum, London, developed by Imperial College London Scientists; Hin Chun Yau and Francois de Luca. '7Black' was incorporated in a neon artwork in the shape of a pair of spectacles entitled Black Eye- Third Sight. Furr stated that this black body material would be available to any artist that wanted to use it.

In 2019, Furr was made Ambassador of Culture for Metropolitan Borough of Wirral. and had a mid career retrospective exhibition of his artworks at Williamson Art Gallery and Museum.

In 2022, Furr was commissioned by The Dorchester on Park Lane, to create a 2.7 metre oil painting based on the Serpentine and Hyde Park.

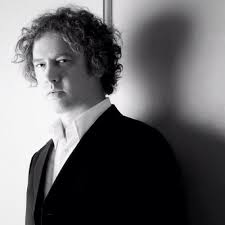
Christian Furr portrait (unknown year)

In 2023, Furr was commissioned to create his biggest painting to date by The Singapore Edition on Orchard Road, Singapore "Arrival' is a 3x4-metre acrylic and oil painting on canvas that resembles a tapestry, which is a fictional depiction of early settlers arriving in Singapore in the 19th century.

In 2026 Furr collaborated with The Kinks co-founders Ray Davies and Dave Davies on an art collection and exhibition titled The Kinks: Brothers.

== Awards ==
- 1991 Furr was awarded The Elizabeth Greenshields Foundation Grant.
- 1993 Winsor & Newton Young Artist’s Award, ROI.
- 2004 Along with Stephen Fry, Furr was awarded the Association of Colleges Gold Award, at the House of Commons, given to further education alumni who have gone on to achieve excellence in their chosen field. Former winners include Jamie Oliver, and Jimmy Choo.
