= Clotilde Jiménez =

American artist

- Born: Clotilde Jiménez; 1990 (age 35–36); Honolulu, Hawaii, U.S.
- Education: Cleveland Institute of Art; Slade School of Fine Art
- Website: www.clotildejimenez.art

Clotilde Jiménez (born 1990) is a multi-disciplinary American artist who works with ceramics, collage, painting, printmaking, and sculpture. His work's common themes include blackness, gender, masculinity, and sexuality. Jiménez lives and works in Mexico City.

== Life and career ==
Jiménez was born in 1990 in Honolulu to Puerto Rican and African-American parents. His father was a body builder and would go on to influence aspects of his work.

He was raised in a poor neighborhood in Philadelphia. He attended Charter High School for Architecture + Design, a now-defunct school that gave opportunities to at-risk kids with creative ambitions.

In 2013, he earned a BFA in printmaking from the Cleveland Institute of Art, and 2018 a MFA from the Slade School of Fine Art, London. Most recently, in early 2023, he was selected as one of the artists to illustrate and give life to the Artistic Posters for the Paris 2024 Olympic & Paralympic Games.

Jiménez works closely with the esteemed art dealer Mariane Ibrahim and is represented by her gallery.

== Individual exhibitions ==
- La Memoria del Agua, Mariane Ibrahim, Mexico City, Mexico, 2023
- The Contest, Mariane Ibrahim, Chicago, IL, USA, 2020
- Un Nouveau Monde, Paris, 2022
- Apple of My Eye, The Jacob Lawrence Gallery, Seattle, WA, USA, 2018

== Collective exhibitions ==
- Left Hanging - One Sculpture, One Rug & Painting, dot.ateliers, Acra, Ghana, 2023
- Puerto Rico Negrx, MAC Puerto Rico, San Juan, Puerto Rico, 2023
- The Condition of Being Addressable, ICA, Los Angeles, CA, USA, 2022
- La Vie en Rose, Mariane Ibrahim, Chicago, IL, USA, 2022
- J'ai Deux Amours..., Mariane Ibrahim, Paris, France, 2022
- Otrxs Mundxs, Museo Tamayo Arte Contemporáneo, Mexico City, Mexico, 2020
- Grace Before Jones: Camera, Disco, Nottingham Contemporary, Nottingham, UK, 2020
- Shifting Gaze, Virginia Museum of Contemporary Art, Virginia Beach, VA, USA, 2020
- A Very Anxious Feeling: Voices of Unrest in the American Experience: 20 Years of the Beth Rubin DeWoody Collection, Taubman Museum of Art, Roanoke, VA, USA, 2020
- Disembodiment, UTA Artist Space, Beverly Hills, CA, USA, 2019
- As Long As We're Flyin 'This World Ain't Got No End, Luce Gallery, Turin, Italy, 2019
- Shifting Gaze: A Reconstruction of the Black & Hispanic Body in Contemporary Art, Mennello Museum of American Art, Orlando, FL, USA, 2018
- Cosmic Traffic Jam, Zevitas Marcus, Los Angeles, CA, 2018
- Black Stories, Mariane Ibrahim, Seattle, WA, USA

== Collections ==
- CSS Bard College Hessel Museum of Art, Annandale-on-Hudson, NY, USA
- Orlando Museum of Art, Orlando, FL, USA
- The Ford Foundation, New York City, NY, USA
- University Hospital, Cleveland, OH, USA
- Dean Collection, Los Angeles, CA, USA

== Publications ==
- Phaidon (2023). Vitamin C+: Collage in Contemporary Art
- Bennett, Joshua; Dunson, Danny; Quinn, Nathaniel Mary; Zimmerman, Emily (2020). Clotilde Jiménez
