= Boris Nzebo =

Painter and installation artist

- Born: 1979 (age 45–46); Port-Gentil, Gabon
- Occupations: Painter, sign painter

Boris Nzebo (born 1979) is a Gabonese painter, who lives in Douala, Cameroon.

== Biography ==
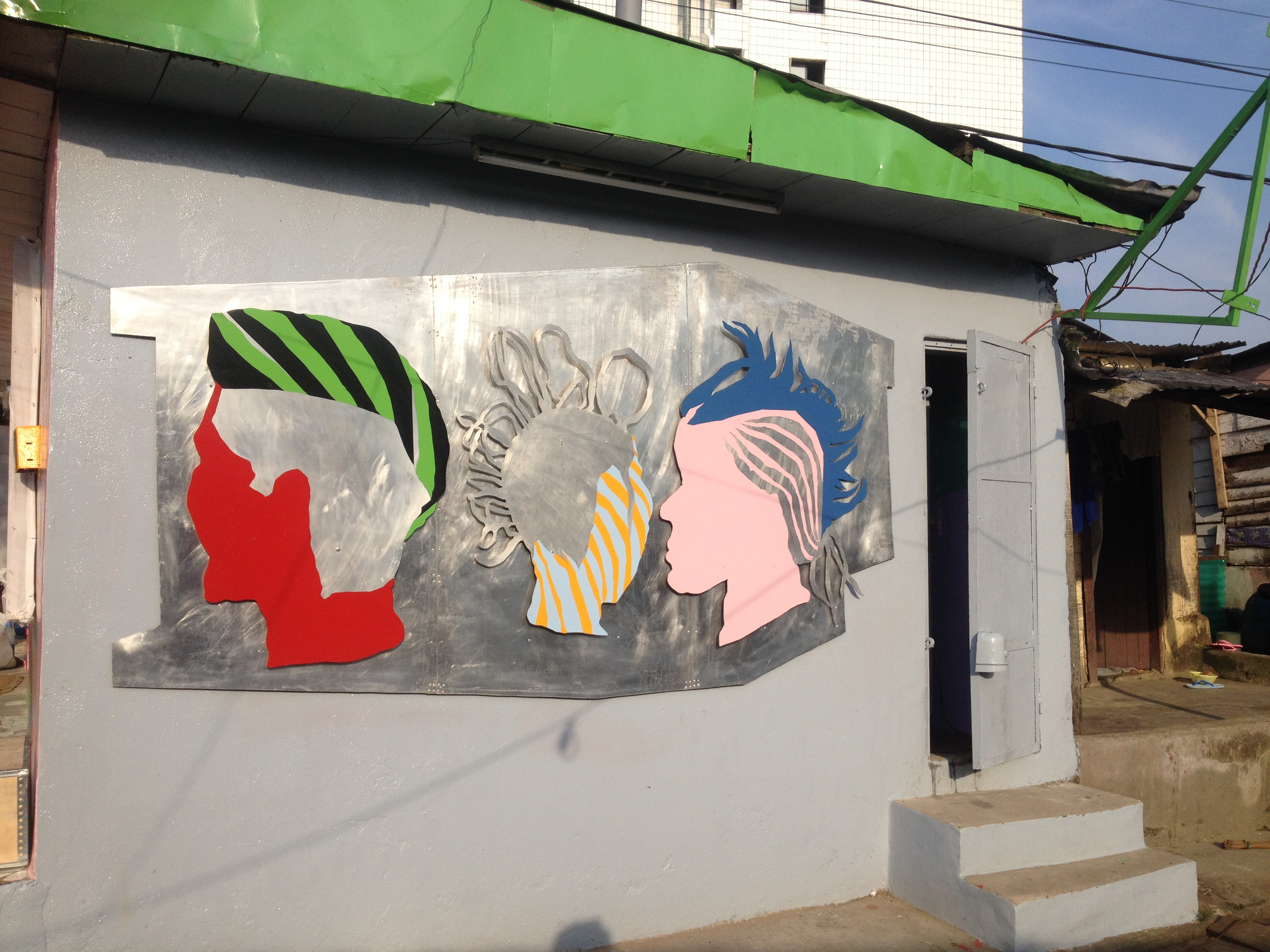
Têtes de rêve par Boris Nzebo

Born in Port-Gentil, Gabon, Nzebo primary studies took place in Libreville in Gabon.

Arriving in Cameroon, he began by custom painting signs for hairdressing and beauty salons. Then he gave that up to devote himself exclusively to art in the early 2000s. Painting for advertising initially has left its mark on his artistic identity.

As a self-taught artist, he trained in Douala with artists Koko Komégné, one of the pioneers of contemporary art in Cameroon, Hervé Yamguen and in workshops organized by Goddy Leye at ArtBakery in Bonendale near Douala, where he did a residency in 2007. During this residency, he mingled with different mediums: video, photo, installation and performance. He also submerged himself into the works of Roy Lichtenstein, Jack Mitchell, Jean-Michel Basquiat, Banksy and Takashi Murakami, whom he particularly likes. At the art space doual'art, he has assisted artists like Faouzi Laatiris (2007), Ato Malinda, Tracy Rose and Mariela Borello (2009), who added to Nzebo's education in their exchanges, discussions and artistic projects. Subsequently, he says his singular theme is to explore hairstyles in the urban space. In them, he sees the signs of social rank, of the expression of a thought, of cultural belonging. How do we grasp that our environment is not as well-groomed as our heads? When our hair is sick we care for it, but we do nothing to combat corruption, the embezzlement of funds, etc. We put so much effort into the treatment of our hair, why can't we do the same thing for the problems plaguing us? Boris intersperses transparent profiles of pretty young women with the décor of precarious habitats.

In April 2008, he presented his work for the first time at the artists' square in Douala, with a group of six artists on the theme Lady, She go say I be Lady, inspired by the title of a cult song by Nigerian singer Fela Ramson Kuti about the emancipation of women.

In June 2009, he participated in the exhibition Jeunes Regards Urbains at doual'art, with two other young Cameroonian artists, Landry Mbassi and Man Faust. From 2010, he has participated in many other collective exhibitions, in Cameroon and abroad: in 2010 the Maison Revue Noire (Paris) and Savvy Contemporary (Berlin), in 2011 to the Blachère Foundation (Apt), then in 2011 and 2012 at Art Paris Art Fair and the Ifa-Galerie (Berlin). His piece Tête en l'Hair was presented at the exhibition 30 ET PRESQUE-SONGES by Joël Andrianomearisoa at doual'art.

His work has been exhibited in two one-man shows, one, In & Out of my head, at the SUD2010 in Douala, and the other, at the off program Vil-Vissages, at the Institut Français in Yaoundé in 2011. In April 2013, his canvases were presented by doual'art at the international fair of contemporary art ART DUBAI, where they were received as a great success. He was noticed by the Jack Bell Gallery of London, which has since offered him a spot at several collective exhibitions at fairs (in London and New York).

== See also ==
- List of public art in Douala

== Bibliography ==
- African Digital Art. Boris Nzebo: http://africandigitalart.com/2016/02/cameroon-pop-artist-boris-nzebo/
- Contemporary African Art Fair. Boris Nzebo: http://1-54.com/new-york/artists/boris-nzebo/
- http://manchesterartgallery.org/exhibitions-and-events/exhibition/boris-nzebo-urban-style/
- Manga, L. (2014). Cameroon une vision contemporaine IV. Le Bureau de la Banque Mondial.http://www.worldbank.org/content/dam/Worldbank/document/Africa/Cameroon/measuring-poverty-and-inequality-sub-saharan-africa-knowledge-gaps-and-ways-address-them-catalogue.pdf
- IAM – Intense Art Magazine. (2014). Boris Nzebo, Africapillaire in IAM#01 CAMEROUN | CAMEROON, p. 058. Available at: http://www.iam-africa.com/wp-content/uploads/2016/05/IAM_MAGAZINE_01_CAMEROON_SAMPLER.pdf [Accessed 28 Nov. 2016].
- Pensa, Iolanda (Ed.) 2017. Public Art in Africa. Art et transformations urbaines à Douala /// Art and Urban Transformations in Douala. Genève: Metis Presses. ISBN 978-2-94-0563-16-6
