= Mariane Ibrahim =

Somali-French art dealer

Mariane Ibrahim-Lenhardt is a Somali-French art dealer based in Chicago, Illinois. She runs the eponymous Mariane Ibrahim Gallery.

== Early life and career ==
Mariane Ibrahim Abdi was born in Nouméa, New Caledonia and grew up in Somaliland and France. She studied advertising in London and worked in marketing in the United Kingdom. In the early 2000s, a trip to Paris started her interest in contemporary African art after she saw a photograph by Seydou Keïta being sold.

== Gallery ==
In 2012, Ibrahim founded the M. I. A. Gallery in Seattle as a way to showcase artists from underrepresented regions such as Africa and the Middle East, focusing primarily on African and African diaspora artists. M. I. A. was an acronym for both the phrase "Missing in Art" and her birth name. She opened the gallery with an exhibit of photos from the Malian artist Malick Sidibé. By 2015, she served on the selection committee for the second Seattle Art Fair. In 2017, Ibrahim won the first Presents booth prize at The Armory Show for her exhibition of photography and textile artist, Zohra Opoku.

The gallery's name was changed to Mariane Ibrahim Gallery and in September 2019 Ibrahim moved her gallery to Chicago, Illinois in the West Town neighborhood. She opened the new gallery with an exhibition of Ayana V. Jackson's photography titled, "Take Me to the Water," which explored African water spirits. In 2021, a second space opened in a renovated three-story space on Avenue Matignon in Paris’s 8th arrondissement. In 2022, the gallery announced plans to add a two-level, 930 m^{2} (10,000 sq ft) exhibition space in Mexico City’s Cuauhtémoc neighborhood. In 2023, Jackson's work was again prominently showcased at Ibrahim's gallery in Mexico City, following a major exhibition at the Smithsonian National Museum of African Art.

Among others, Mariane Ibrahim's gallery has represented artists including Amoako Boafo, Florine Démosthène, Clotilde Jiménez, Thenjiwe Nkosi, Zohra Opoku, Ferrari Sheppard, and Lina Iris Viktor.

== Controversy ==
In 2018, Ibrahim supported artist Lina Iris Viktor in a lawsuit against rapper Kendrick Lamar and R&B star SZA over allegations that a music video for their song “All the Stars” — featured on the soundtrack to the movie Black Panther — drew from Viktor’s work without permission. The parties later agreed to settle on terms that could not be discussed as part of the agreement, though not before 10 months of high-profile media attention was paid to issues surrounding artists’ rights.

== Personal life ==
Ibrahim is married to Pierre Lenhardt. She is Muslim.
