= Tony Rapu =

Nigerian clergyman (born 1957)

- Born: 1 January 1957 (age 69); Kano State, Nigeria)
- Education: University of Ibadan (MBBS, Medicine)
- Alma mater: University of Ibadan
- Occupations: Pastor, Author, Medical Doctor, Filmmaker, Life Coach
- Known for: Preaching of the Word of Faith, Social reforms
- Title: President/Founder, House of Freedom
- Spouse: Nkoyo Rapu (m. 1987)
- Website: tonyrapu.com

Tony Rapu (born 1 January 1957) is a Nigerian pastor, medical doctor, social reformer, filmmaker and life coach. He serves as the Chairman Board of Trustees of The House of Freedom, an umbrella church network that includes This Present House, God Bless Nigeria Church, The Waterbrook Church and The Potter’s House of Lagos.

Rapu is notable for his philanthropic initiatives and social reform efforts in Nigeria, particularly his work with vulnerable and marginalized populations. He has been involved in programmes aimed at community rehabilitation, poverty alleviation and the reintegration of individuals affected by drug abuse and social exclusion. Through faith-based and outreach platforms, Rapu has supported interventions focused on addiction recovery, vocational training and social reintegration, with an emphasis on restoring dignity and economic self-sufficiency among indigent communities.

== Early life ==
Rapu was born in Kano State, in the northwestern part of Nigeria, into an Igbo Catholic family. He was educated at King's College, Lagos, and later attended the University of Ibadan, where he studied Zoology before enrolling in medical school. He obtained a Bachelor of Medicine and Bachelor of Surgery degree and qualified as a medical doctor. He subsequently practiced at Eko Hospital in Lagos prior to entering full-time ministry.

== Ministry ==
Rapu began his Christian ministry in the mid-1980s while practicing medicine. In 1986, following a religious conversion, he joined the Redeemed Christian Church of God and became a close associate of its General Overseer, Enoch Adejare Adeboye. During his time in RCCG, he was involved in parish development, leadership training, and discipleship programmes. He hosted house fellowships in Surulere, Lagos, and in 1991 led a group that helped establish the Apapa Parish, where he developed structured teaching materials focused on worship, Bible study, prayer, and fasting.

He later founded and leads the House of Freedom, a network of churches and faith-based initiatives. He is also the founder of the Freedom Foundation, a non-profit organisation focused on social rehabilitation, empowerment, and community development, with programmes addressing addiction recovery, child support, and social advocacy.

== Personal life ==
In 1987, Rapu married Nkoyo Bassey Rapu, who was a trained lawyer, and later became a ministry partner. His wife is involved in church and foundation leadership. They have three children: Uju, Kene, and Tobe.
