= Gallery 1957 =

Art gallery in Accra, Ghana

- Established: 6 March 2016
- Location: Accra, Ghana and London, United Kingdom
- Type: Contemporary art gallery
- Founder: Marwan Zakhem
- Director: Angelica Litta Modignani
- Website: gallery1957.com

Gallery 1957 is a contemporary art gallery located in Accra, Ghana. The gallery intends to present artists of West Africa and the diaspora. It was established in March 2016 by British construction company owner Marwan Zakhem. As of 2018, the gallery has shown artists including Serge Attukwei Clottey, Gideon Appah, Modupeola Fadugba, Godfried Donkor, Yaw Owusu, and Zohra Opoku.

Gallery 1957 opened on Ghanaian Independence Day on 6 March 2016, and is named for the year that Ghana gained independence from British colonial rule. It opened its first two locations at the Kempinski Hotel Gold Coast City in Accra. In October 2020, the gallery opened a London location with an exhibition by Ghanaian artist Kwesi Botchway, co-curated by British writer Ekow Eshun.

Ghanaian writer and filmmaker Nana Oforiatta Ayim serves as the gallery's creative director. The gallery also organises the Yaa Asantewaa Art Prize, which recognises African female artists in the international art scene. It is the first art prize dedicated to female African artists.
