= James Hayward (artist) =

American painter (1943–2026)

- Born: September 22, 1943; San Francisco, California, U.S.
- Died: April 16, 2026 (aged 82)
- Known for: Painting
- Movement: Abstract painting, monochrome painting, process art, minimalism

James Hayward (September 22, 1943 – April 16, 2026) was an American contemporary abstract painter who lived and worked in Moorpark, California. Hayward's paintings are usually divided in two bodies of work: flat paintings (1975–1984) and thick paintings (1984–2026). He worked in series, some of which were re ongoing, and include The Annunciations, The Stations of the Cross, the Red Maps, Fire Paintings, Smoke Paintings, Sacred and Profane, and Nothing's Perfect series.

== Education and teaching ==
Hayward got his Bachelor of Arts at San Diego State University, San Diego, California, studied in the Graduate art program at the University of California, Los Angeles (UCLA) from 1966 to 1969 and got his Master of Fine Arts at the University of Washington, Seattle in 1972.

Taught:

- 1994–2012 – Art Center College of Design, Pasadena, CA, Graduate Art Programs
- 1999 – University of California, Los Angeles (winter quarter)
- 1997 – University of Texas at San Antonio (guest artist / fall semester)
- 1992–1995 – University of California, Los Angeles
- 1987 – University of Southern California, Los Angeles, CA (guest artist / spring quarter)
- 1985 – College of Creative Studies, University of California, Santa Barbara
- 1983 – University of California, Berkeley, CA (guest artist)
- 1980 – Minneapolis College of Art & Design, Minneapolis, Minnesota (guest artist)
- 1979 – California State University, Bakersfield (guest artist)
- 1976–1978 – College of Creative Studies, University of California, Santa Barbara, CA

== Writing ==
In 2010, Hayward produced a book of short stories entitled Indiscretion: Selected Stories, based on his reminiscences, "war stories" as his close friend artist Ed Moses called them. Writing in The Huffington Post, Gordy Grundy fescribed it as "a chronicle of a ribald life in the arts as well as a glimpse of SoCal living".

== Exhibitions ==
Hayward exhibited extensively, particularly in California, from his first show solo show in 1976. He exhibited at historically significant galleries such as Claire S. Copley Gallery, Riko Mizuno Gallery and Rosamund Felsen Gallery and Roberts Projects in Los Angeles and Sidney Janis Gallery in New York, and his work has been included in museum exhibitions in institutions such as the Museum of Contemporary Art, Los Angeles, Los Angeles County Museum of Art, San Francisco Museum of Modern Art, Hirshhorn Museum, Washington D.C., The Renaissance Society At The University Of Chicago, and the Institute of Contemporary Art (ICA) in London, England. among others. Through the 1990s and 2000s he exhibited extensively at Modernism, San Francisco and Ace Contemporary Exhibitions in Los Angeles. Artist Mike Kelley curated a solo exhibition of his work in 2005 at the Cue Art Foundation in New York calling Hayward "one of the few truly important West Coast Painters." Also in 2005, critic and educator Dave Hickey included his work in a curated show entitled Step into Liquid, at the Ben Maltz Gallery, Otis College of Art and Design, Los Angeles.

Hayward's work was included in "Under the Big Black Sun" at the Museum of Contemporary Art, Los Angeles, curated by Paul Schimmel in 2011. A solo exhibition of his work was mounted at Richard Telles Fine Art, in Los Angeles titled James Hayward Paintings from the 70's in conjunction with the Getty's Pacific Standard Time in 2011. Meanwhile, Hayward's Annunciation paintings, were displayed in the solo exhibition Variations on the Annunciation at Meliksetian | Briggs in Los Angeles in 2013.

== Death ==
Hayward died on April 16, 2026, at the age of 82.

== Works in institutional and museum collections ==
- Museum of Contemporary Art, Los Angeles, California
- San Francisco Museum of Modern Art, California
- Los Angeles County Museum of Art, California
- Cleveland Museum of Art, Cleveland, Ohio
- Albright-Knox Gallery, Buffalo, New York
- San Jose Museum of Art, San Jose, California
- Minneapolis Institute of the Arts, Minneapolis, Minnesota
- Denver Museum of Modern Art, Denver, Colorado
- Orange County Museum of Art, Newport Beach, California
- Laguna Beach Museum of Art, Laguna Beach, California
- University Art Museum, Santa Barbara, California
- Museum of Contemporary Art, North Miami, Florida
- Weisman Museum of Art, Pepperdine University, Malibu, California
- Anderson School of Business, University of California, Los Angeles, California

== Honors and awards ==
- 1977 – Young Talent Award, Los Angeles County Museum of Art
- 1981 – Japan-United States Creative Arts Fellowship
- 1983 – John Simon Guggenheim Memorial Fellowship
- 1991 – Awards in the Visual Arts 10 Grant
- 1993 – National Endowment for the Arts Fellowship
- 1996 – Pollock-Krasner Foundation Grant

== Sources ==
- Carlson, Ben. James Hayward At Richard Telles Fine Art, Artforum, February 2012 Vol. 50, No. 6, P. 235.
- Schimmel, Paul (Editor), Mark, Lisa Gabrielle (Editor), Colpitt, Frances (Contributor), Crow, Thomas (Contributor), Desmarais, Charles (Contributor), Under the Big Black Sun; California Art 1974-1981, Prestel Publishing, 2011.
- Colpitt, Frances. Marks And Movement: Five Painters, catalogue, Barrett Art Gallery, Santa Monica, CA, 2011.
- Pagel, David. Take Pleasure In Monochrome, Los Angeles Times. April 11, 2008 P.E19
- Baker, Kenneth. James Hayward Pursues A Kind Of ‘Pure Painting’ San Francisco Chronicle, September 15, 2007 P. E1.
- Frank, Peter. James Hayward. Artus, Issue 17 March–April 2007, P. 28.
- Melrod, George. James Hayward: Monster Of Monochrome, Art Ltd, January 200 P. 38 to 45.
- Hickey, Dave, Colpitt Frances, Smith Jason. James Hayward Works 1975-2007. Modernism Inc., 2007.
- Knight, Christopher. Just Going With The Flow, Los Angeles Times, January 14, 2006 P. E 2.
- Colpitt, Frances & Gilbert-Rolfe. Jeremy, Monster Of Monochrome, Mandarin Press, Los Angeles 2006.
- Kelley, Mike. James Hayward, catalogue, Cue Art Foundation, New York, 2005.
- Knight, Christopher. Earthly Creators Find The Divine In Their Details, Los Angeles Times, August 11, 2004, P. E1.
- Pagel, David. Celebrating Paint’s Physicality, Los Angeles Times, August 1, 2003, Calendar.
- Hickey, Dave, Pagel, David and Scanlan, Joe. Plane/Structures, catalogue, The Fellows Of Contemporary Art, Los Angeles, CA 1994.
- Colpitt, Frances. Mapping, catalogue, The University Of Texas, San Antonio, 1994.
- Colpitt, Frances. In Plain Sight: Abstract Painting In Los Angeles, catalogue. Blue Star Art Space, San Antonio, Texas 1994.
- Rutter, Virginia S, Kopf, Vicki, Fleming, Jeff. Awards In The Visual Arts 10, catalogue, Southeastern Center for Contemporary Art, 1991.
- Plous, Phylis & Colpitt, Frances. Abstract Options, catalogue, The National Endowment For The Arts, 1989.
