= Lakin Ogunbanwo =

Nigerian photographer

- Education: Babcock University; Buckingham University
- Occupation: Photographer

Lakin Ogunbanwo is a Nigerian fashion photographer also known for his expression of sulky visuals.

== Early life and education ==
Before attending Buckingham University, Ogunbanwo studied Law at Babcock University. Then adopted a career in photography in 2012. A 2015 feature by Forbes describes Ogunbanwo as a "self-taught photographer". According to Ogunbanwo, despite always having a passion for photography, he began to learn the art by practicing with the images of his sisters. After practicing photography based on his self-acquired knowledge, Ogunbanwo decided to get formal training by attending Spéos Photography Institute in Paris. His genre of photography has been described to be of two types - "bold and provocative photography" as well as "fashion photography". Speaking to Vogue Italia on the reason for his choice of profession, Ogunbanwo stated, "...I didn't choose photography, photography chose me...".

== Career ==
Ogunbanwo works has been published in many international magazines including Billboard (magazine), Vogue, GQ, New York Times, etc. He has also been professionally involved with renowned author, Chimamanda Ngozi Adichie. In an April 2019 publication by CNN, Ogunbanwo was listed as one of the seven leading photographers in Africa. In an interview with BellaNaija, Ogunbanwo highlighted electricity issues as the biggest challenge as a photographer. He also downplayed the notion that the high cost of living in Africa reduces the appreciation of professional art. He explained that "art is about arousing emotions for people to connect". He was included in British Journal of Photography top 25 photographers - talent discovery for 2015.

In May 2016, Vogue (magazine) did a feature on the portraits of Ogunbanwo that examined the socio-cultural implications on the hat being worn to a Nigerian man's identity. In February 2020, he became the first artist to be awarded the 1-54 Contemporary African art residency program sponsored by Thami Mnyele Foundation. In an attempt to increase awareness on the diversity of African communities, Ogunbanwo was featured by Collosal in a series where he shared portraits on Nigerian brides and their corresponding attire based on their ethnic group. This was praised by the writer as it counters the western unitary mindset about Africa. It was also featured on CNN, Creative Boom, Vogue (magazine), among others.

=== Selected projects ===
- Are We Good Enough (2012) - project about interpretation of various hats worn in Nigeria
- E wa Wo Mi (English translation: Come and See Me) - project about bridal attires of various ethnic groups in Nigeria
- Project appreciating African women curvaceous bodies
