= Aboudia =

Ivorian artist

- Born: Abdoulaye Diarrassouba; October 21, 1983 (age 42); Ivory Coast/Côte d'Ivoire
- Education: Institut des Arts in Abidjan

Abdoulaye Diarrassouba, also known as Aboudia, is an Ivorian contemporary artist based in Brooklyn, New York, and who works from his studios in Abidjan and New York City.

== Biography ==
He was born on October 21, 1983, in Côte d'Ivoire, and graduated from the School of Applied Arts in Bingerville in 2003. In 2005, he graduated from the Institut des Arts in Abidjan. He first reached an international audience during the siege of Abidjan in 2011, when the conflict came close to his studio. Some of his works has been exhibited in Basel, Miami, New York, Singapore, and Art Central in Hong Kong. He has also done various solo shows with galleries in New York, London, Barcelona, Copenhagen and more. In 2012, he collaborated with Ivorian artist Frédéric Bruly Bouabré on producing a unique series of paintings exhibited in Abidjan. In 2017 Abdoulaye collaborated with British internationally acclaimed painter Christian Furr, producing works between New York, London and Abidjan.

== Career ==
Since the age of 15, Abdoulaye has been on his own as an artist. He was kicked out of his childhood home by his father once it was known that Abdoulaye wanted to become an artist. His mother gave him the last of his savings to complete a scholarship. While being at the top of his class, he slept in the classroom when everyone else would leave for the day.

Throughout 2007 and 2008 Aboudia marched around Bingerville and the centre of Abidjan, where the galleries were located. And also Ivorian gallery owners turn him away and later on mocked his style of painting. After some time, people began to buy Aboudia work, mostly ambassadors and gallery owners in other countries. In December 2010, Alassane Ouattara was declared the winner of the second round of the presidential election. The current president at the time Laurent Gbagbo, did not accept the initial result. Laurent ordered the military to close the country's borders and foreign news organisation were banned. Tensions continued to mount as he was sworn in as president. During this time Abdoulaye was able to paint 21 canvases ranging from 120 x 80 cm to 400 x 180 cm.

In 2012 and 2014, Abdoulaye's work was exhibited in the Ivory Coast, at the Galerie Cécile Fakhoury in Abidjan, as well as Europe and North America, and bought by influential contemporary art collectors including Charles Saatchi, Jean Pigozzi and Frank Cohen. Aboudia is influenced by a synthesis of American avant-garde traditions and the graffiti in the communities where he lives. Many in the art world relate his work to Jean-Michel Basquiat, who was the first black American who gained fame for his contemporary paintings with African characteristics. Basquiat combined African and Afro-American culture and style in his work, which may seem an irritating and predictable way to establish the value of a young painter's work. This fusion of culture and style can be seen in Abdouia's work as well. Abdouia's work uses both indirect and direct references to African and Western styles. In fact, the riots that followed the disputed Ivorian presidential election in late 2010 greatly influenced Aboudia's painting. He refuses to be categorized as a 'war painter'.

The well-represented West African painters took home the majority of the afternoon sale. The Ivorian Abdoulaye Abdoudia Diarrassouba (known as Aboudia, b1983) and Dominique Zinkpe (Benin, b1969) both sold above estimate, but at much lower price points than their Modern counterparts. Zinkpe's "Les Villagois" sold for £10,000 (£12,500 with fees, est £7,000-£9,000), and Abdoulaye's four works in the sale all sold well (up to £30,000, with fees).

While some artists chose to flee the civil war, Aboudia decided to stay and continue working despite the danger. He worked in an artist's studio right next to the Golf Hotel [Ouattara's headquarters during the post-electoral crisis]; he could hear the bullets zipping through the air while he painted. When the shooting got too heavy, he hid in the cellar and tried to imagine what was going on. As soon as things calmed down he would go back upstairs and paint everything he had in mind. Whenever he was able to go outside, he would paint everything he saw as soon as he returned. Some of his paintings were also inspired by footages he saw on the news or the internet. His body of work, which he describes as "nouchi", is a tribute to the essence of dreams and language. He uses materials within easy reach to express the maximum depth of content with a minimum of resources. Local galleries refused to represent his works. Most of his work, which is seen as too avant-garde for local Ivorian tastes, is bought by foreigners. The disapproval from his people did not swerve his decision to depict this national crisis in his paintings. "As an artist, my contribution is to tell our story for the next generation. Writers will write, singers will sing. I paint," Aboudia said After the war broke out, the themes of his painting changed. His goal was to create a record of Côte d'Ivoire's recent history. Now, he goes back to his original themes which are childhood in the streets, poorness, and child soldiers.

He says, "That's my modest impact because it is thanks to their story that I have my story, and we have to help each other." Success has brought him a sense of responsibility for other artists, which led to him creating a cultural center and foundation in Bingerville. The foundation gives young people living on the streets access to health and education. Aboudia views creating art as a means of attempting to understand current events. "Why can't we make peace and choose to assist those who are sleeping on the streets if we can make war?" he says. "What's not working? We have that power." That's the question I keep asking myself. I'm hoping to discover the way out."

== Style ==
Aboudia depicts fevered landscapes and street scenes populated by childlike figures in his graffiti like style. "Assassin" powerfully demonstrates Aboudia's trademark "nouchi" style. Rendered in oil sticks, acrylics and collage, his works are noted for brutal lines of color applied to heavily layered background collages, details of newspaper and magazine cutouts ingeniously encircled by drawings fall in and out of focus. The resulting composition suggests current events cohering through the imagination into a provocative vision.

Aboudia's multi-layered paintings offer a simultaneity of images and meanings that conduct a continuous discourse with each other and with the viewer. The surfaces deploy fragments, cuttings, from bits of comic strips, magazine ads, newspaper images, set into the paintings' overall compositions so as to suggest current events cohering through the imagination into a troubled and troubling vision.

" My style shifted from one that was classic and academic in nature, as well as highly influence by the African culture and decoration, into one increasingly influence by wall scribbles."

His main subject was mural art. There would be simple drawings on the walls, done by the youth using charcoal, mostly of cars, televisions, status symbols, statements and saying; children are seen as the weakest, not taken seriously and left alone in the world.
