= Amoako Boafo =

Ghanaian painter

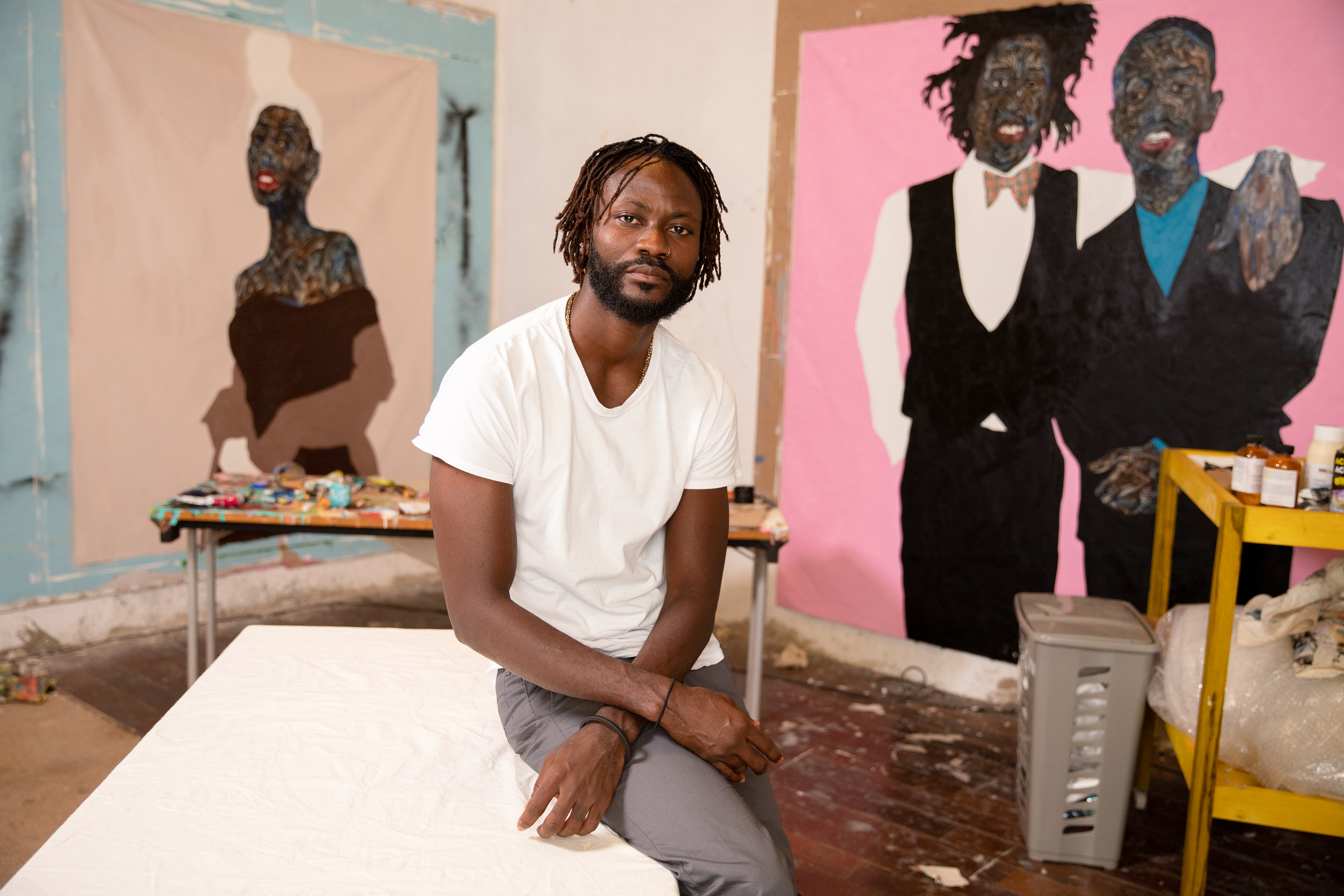
- Portrait of Amoako Boafo
- Born: Thomas Amoako Boafo; 10 May 1984 (age 42); Osu Accra, Ghana
- Education: Ghanatta College of Art and Design; Academy of Fine Arts Vienna
- Known for: Visual art, painter

Thomas Amoako Boafo, known as Amoako Boafo (born 10 May 1984), was born and raised in Osu, in the Greater Accra Region of Ghana.

== Early life and education ==
He attended the Ghanatta College of Art and Design in Accra, and later continued his education at the Academy of Fine Arts Vienna in Austria.

While attending grad school in Vienna, Boafo received comments that his figures were "too black". Unfazed by the negativity thrown at him, Boafo continued his portraiture of Black community.

== Career ==
Boafo's portraits focus on posture, clothing, and the depiction of skin which he accentuates with the finger painting technique. According to his Chicago and Paris gallerist Mariane Ibrahim, Boafo's paintings represent a leap forward in portraiture, stating that he changed and innovated the way portraiture is done. Ibrahim specializes in representing African diaspora art.

In 2019, Boafo participated in a residency at the new Rubell Museum in Miami, Florida, and in 2020 collaborated with Dior for their Spring/Summer 2021 Men Collection.

His work Suborbital Triptych, consisting of three portraits of himself, his mother, and a friend's mother, was printed on the top of the crew capsule of a New Shepard rocket that performed an unmanned suborbital launch on August 26, 2021, reaching outer space with an apogee of 106 km. On 26 May 2022, his debut U.S. exhibit, Soul of Black Folks, opened at Contemporary Arts Museum Houston and later traveled to the Denver Art Museum in 2023.

== Collections ==
Sitting on the sun by Amoako Boafo shown at Colección Solo museum in Madrid (Spain).

Boafo's work is in private and public collections, most recently in the Blenheim Art Foundation, Los Angeles County Museum of Art, Solomon R. Guggenheim Museum, Hirshhorn Museum, Rubell Museum, Marieluise Hessel Collection, the Aishti Foundation, the CCS Bard College Hessel Museum of Art, the Pizzuti Collection of Columbus Museum of Art, Colección Solo and the Albertina Museum in Vienna.

== Exhibitions ==
=== Group exhibitions ===
- 2022. Certeza. Espacio SOLO - Colección SOLO (Madrid, Spain). On show Sitting on the Sun (2019).

=== Solo exhibitions ===
- 2024. Proper Love, Belvedere Museum, (Vienna, Austria).
- 2025. I Do Not Come to You by Chance, Gagosian Gallery (London, UK).

== Recognition ==
- 2017 – Jury prize, Walter Koschatzky Art Prize
- 2019 – STRABAG Art award International

== Art market ==
Boafo is represented by Mariane Ibrahim Gallery in Chicago and Roberts Projects in Los Angeles. In 2021, his Hands Up (2018) sold for HKD 26.7 million ($3.4 million) at Christie's in Hong Kong.
