= Pamela Sunstrum =

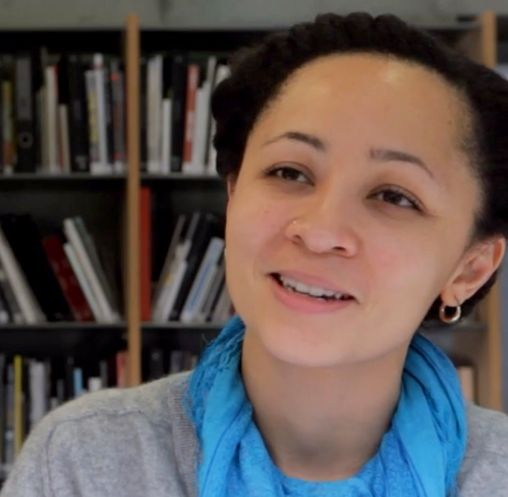
- Occupation: Animator

Pamela Phatsimo Sunstrum is a visual artist. Her practice includes drawing, painting, installation, and animation. Her work has been featured in numerous exhibitions, including The Curve Space at The Barbican, The Hague, and the Centre for Fine Arts Bozar.

== Biography ==
Sunstrum was born in 1980 in Mochudi, Botswana, and spent her childhood in different parts of Africa and southeast Asia. She came to the United States in 1998 and received a BA with Highest Honors from the University of North Carolina at Chapel Hill in International Studies with a concentration in Trans-national Cultures in 2004. Sunstrum received her MFA from the Mt. Royal School of Art at the Maryland Institute College of Art in 2007. She later lived in Baltimore Maryland as an artist in residence at the Baltimore Creative Alliance, while also teaching at the Maryland Institute College of Art. She is currently based out of Johannesburg, South Africa while showcasing in both individual and group exhibitions around the world. Sunstrum was appointed assistant professor in the Department of Visual Art & Art History of York University in 2017. After retiring from teaching in 2020, Sunstrum now lives and works in The Hague, The Netherlands. She is currently represented by Goodman Gallery and Galerie Lelong &Co. NYC. Sunstrum describes her work as her contribution to the rising tide of global voices dissenting against colonialism, apartheid, genocide, and all other forms of human and ecological oppression and exploitation that have spawned from centuries of capitalistic greed and corruption.

== Career ==
=== Solo Exhibitions ===
- 2024 It will end in tears, The Curve Space, The Barbican, London, UK
- 2024 The Gods and The Underdogs, KM21, The Hague, The Netherlands
- 2023 You'll be sorry, Goodman Gallery, Johannesburg, South Africa
- 2023 The Pavillion, London Mithraeum, Bloomberg Space, London, UK
- 2022 I have withheld much more than I have written, Galerie Lelong & Co., New York, NY USA
- 2011 Panthea, Goodman Gallery, East Hamptons, NY, USA
- 2020 Battlecry, Goodman Gallery, London, UK
- 2019 Diorama, Tiwani Contemporary, London UK
- 2019 All my seven faces, Contemporary Arts Center, Cincinnati, OH, USA
- 2018 There are mechanisms in place, Michaelis School of Fine Art, University of Cape Town, South Africa
- 2016 OMPHALOS, Interlochen Center for the Arts, Interlochen, MI, USA
- 2016 POLYHEDRA, Tiwani Contemporary, London, UK
- 2015 BEACON, Visual Arts Network of South Africa, Johannesburg, South Africa
- 2013 ab initio, Davidson College, Davidson, NC, USA
- 2010 pamelaphatsimosunstrum, Conduit Gallery, Dallas, TX, USA
- 2009 audax/viator, Arlington Arts Center, Arlington, VA, USA
- 2009 see you again, Marcia Wood Gallery, Atlanta, GA, USA

=== Group Exhibitions ===
- 2023 uMoya: The Sacred Return of Lost Things, Liverpool Biennial, Liverpool, UK
- 2022 How rest the brave?, Nest, The Hague, The Netherlands
- 2021 Greater Toronto Art 2021 (GTA21), Museum of Contemporary Art Toronto, Canada
- 2020 Did you evern think there would come a time? Goodman Gallery, Cape Town, South Africa
- 2020 Witness: Afro Perspectives from the Jorge M. Peréz Collection, Miami, FL, USA
- 2020 Born in Flames: Feminist Futures, Bronx Museum, NY, USA
- 2020 UBUNTU Five Rooms from the Harry David Art Collection, National Museum of Contemporary Art, Athens
- 2019 History is His Story, Nest, The Hague, The Netherlands

== Bibliography ==
- 13/03/16 at 03:51 Am by Admin, Admin. “Pamela Phatsimo Sunstrum.” AFRICANAH.ORG. Tiwani Contemporary, 12 Mar. 2016. Web. 19 Apr. 2017.
- ”Pamela Phatsimo Sunstrum.” 30 Artworks, Bio & Shows on Artsy. Artsy, n.d. Web. 19 Apr. 2017.
- ”PAMElA PHATSIMO SUNSTRUM.” Marcia Wood Gallery. Marcia Wood Gallery, 2016. Web. 19 Apr. 2017.
- Haden, Alexis, and Ezra Claymore. “Artist Pamela Phatsimo Sunstrum Explodes on London’s Art Scene.” The South African. The South African, 29 Mar. 2015. Web. 19 Apr. 2017.
- ”Pamela Phatsimo Sunstrum.” Pamela Phatsimo Sunstrum Biography – Pamela Phatsimo Sunstrum on Artnet. N.p., n.d. Web. 19 Apr. 2017.
