= Angèle Etoundi Essamba =

Cameroonian photographer

Angèle Etoundi Essamba is a Cameroonian photographer living and working in Amsterdam. She is most famously known for her work in black and white, humanistic photography, that often focuses on the African woman as a subject matter. Essamba is one of the most acclaimed and accomplished African female photographers of her generation, who has had more than 200 exhibitions around the world, and more than 50 publications in journals and magazines. She has said that "Photography is for me a need, the need to express and to communicate. As long as the need will exist, I will create."

== Biography ==
Angèle Etoundi Essaamba was born in Douala, Cameroon in 1962, and grew up in Yaounde on her Grandfather's compound. In an interview with Femi Akomolafe, she recalled living with a large community of aunts, uncles, nieces, brothers, cousins, and sisters, "with everyone living in complete harmony devoid of strive". At 9-10 years old, she moved to Paris with her father, where she lived up through receiving her high school education. Then, by 1982, she was married, and moved to Amsterdam (Netherlands) where she began studying photography at the Nederlandse Fotovak school (Dutch School for Professional Photography). Essamba later attended the Lyceum in Paris, where she studied philosophy, dance, and photography. She returned to Cameroon again after nineteen years of what she called a "self-chosen exile" in her interview with Femi Akomolafe.

She is associated with DUTA, or Douala Urban Touch of Arts, which allows Central African visual artists in Douala to share their work. Essamba's social awareness of both Europe and Africa led her to create the Foundation Essamba Home in 2009, where she mentors street girls in Cameroon to build their self-esteem and self-worth, personally gives lessons, and teaches skills to help girls in Cameroon improve their living conditions and create careers for themselves.

== Photographic career ==
Essamba's photography focuses on the African women, and breaking gender stereotypes. She works to inspire discussions between cultures and people, and gives her subject value and voice. Her art is not only influenced by modernism, but by her African descent and her countries diverse cultural environment. Drawing on her personal experiences, history, culture, perspective and environmental influences, Essamba's photographs combine technique with a strong sense of emotion. Additionally, she defies the boundaries between realistic photography, social and political commentary, documentary and formal photography, while displaying her aesthetic vision of the black, female body.

Her first exhibition was in 1985 at the Gallerie Art Collective in Amsterdam. Her 1995 series of black-and-white photographs, White Line, was awarded the Prix Spécial Afrique at the Festival des Trois Continents, Nantes in 1996. She has shown her works in several exhibitions in Africa, Asia, Europe, Latin America, the United Arab Emirates and the United States including: Bienal de La Habana (1994), Venice Biennale (1994), Johannesburg Biennale (1995), Festival of the Three Continents (1996).

Since the time of her debut exhibition in Amsterdam in 1985, Essamba's body of work has been shown at a variety of institutions, biennales, and fairs. These locations include Venice, Havana, Dakar, Johannesburg, and Bamako, along with events across Africa, Europe, the United States, Cuba, Mexico, and China. Most recently, she has held monographic exhibitions of her work Daughters of a Life in Munich, at the Museum Fünf Kontinente in 2018.
