= Ato Malinda =

Artist

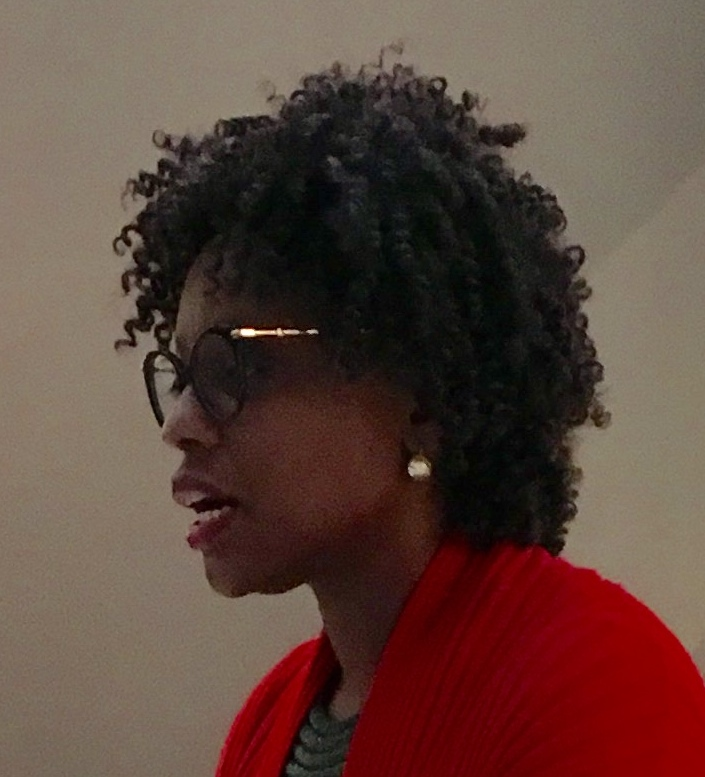
- Malinda in 2019
- Born: 1981 (age 44–45); Nairobi, Kenya
- Other name: Alex Mawimbi
- Education: The University of Texas at Austin, Transart Institute in New York
- Occupation: Artist

Ato Malinda, is a multidisciplinary performance artist.

== Early life ==
In 1981 she was born in Kenya, as the daughter of a Kenyan mother and an Ugandan father. She grew up in the Netherlands, but returned to Kenya as a teenager. After high school she moved to the USA where she studied Art History and Molecular Biology at the University of Texas. She had a rough childhood of not being able to satisfy her father's desires of becoming a doctor. In 2006 after moving to London for a little, her desire to pursue art was reawakened. Ato was born with a Ugandan name, however at the beginning of her practice she created an artistic persona, Ato Malinda. She briefly adopted the name Alex Mawimbi to align to her identity but it did not work, so she changed it back to Ato Malinda. Ato has lived and worked in many places, from the USA, The Netherlands, Germany and has now moved back to Kenya where she works in multiple art disciplines: video art, performance art, installation, drawing, and painting. In addition, she works as an educator and curator. Ato is one of a few performance artists in East Africa and is fighting hard for this relatively unknown art discipline to become more accepted. Many of Ato's performances are transformed into video art, with new layers and perspectives added to the original performance

== Career ==
She studied art history and molecular biology at the University of Texas, in hopes of becoming a doctor. She received a Master of Fine Arts degree from Transart Institute in New York. Her work explores the facets of African identity and authenticity in mediums including performance, music, drawing and painting, installation, ceramics, and video. She focuses on gender and female sexuality, especially the stories of LGBTQ communities, and in the past has focused on the representation of African objects in Western museums. At the 2010 SUD triennial in Douala, Cameroon, Malinda performed a piece on the myth of the water goddess Mami Wata in the mangroves of the Douala's Wouri River. The performance, On fait ensemble, was both observed and recorded. In 2016, she was an awardee at the National Museum of African Art's inaugural African Art Awards and highlighted by The Wall Street Journal as an emerging artist. Malinda is based in Rotterdam.

== Works ==
Ato Malinda has exhibited in numerous countries in Africa, Europe and the Caribbean and had residencies in Cameroon, Denmark, and Curaçao. The following are a few of her works highlighted:

=== Prison Sex II, (2009) ===
Prison Sex II is a series of works that began with a community mural evolved in to a public performance and then became a video triptych. The mural was painted during Urban Wasanii 2008; a Triangle Arts Trust workshop in Mombasa, Kenya. The image was of a leso, a piece of cloth that came from the suture of handkerchiefs worn by Portuguese merchants in the 16th century. The local women on the Kenyan coast traded with the merchants and sewed the handkerchiefs into cloths they could wrap around their bodies. These cloths evolved to become the lesos that we know today in East Africa. The mural's message was to “know your history, but own your culture.” This made reference to the history of the textile that so many people believe is indigenous to East Africa when in fact it represents a history of hybridism. The public performance of Prison Sex II was inside the Fort Jesus museum and devoted to the memory of a woman who was imprisoned there during colonial rule when the museum was a prison, as means to gain autonomy from her husband. The central video of the triptych talks about this woman as well as a female Kenyan freedom fighter named Me Kitilili. Me Kitilili was also imprisoned at the fort because she fought British colonists who wanted to cut down sacred forests on the Kenyan coastline.

=== Fait Ensemble, 2010 ===
The video is about Mami Wata, an ancient African water spirit, who has been worshipped by Africans before the arrival of Europeans but came into recorded history in the 15th Century. It was recorded that at the sight of European ships, Africans associated water spirits with the Europeans. During colonialism, in the 1880s a famous German hunter, Breitwiser, brought back a wife from Southeast Asia to Germany. Breitwiser's wife performed in Hamburg's volkerschau, essentially human zoos, under the stage name “Maladamatjaute”. She charmed snakes. The Frienlaender lithographic company, in Hamburg, made a chromolithograph of the snake charmer, the original of which has never been found. However in 1955, this image was reprinted in Bombay, India, sent to them from Ghana. It is unknown how exactly the image got to West Africa, but it is thought to have been taken from Hamburg by African sailors when they were in Germany. However on its arrival in Africa, locals declared Maladamatjaute to be a resemblance to Mami Wata. The image has since proliferated throughout the African continent as Mami Wata, the snake charmer. On Fait Ensemble suggests in a metaphorical sense, that this image came from Europeans. This is done through the market performance of Papai Wata. Papai Wata, the concomitant to Mami Wata in Beninese traditional ceremonies, symbolizes the European man and is depicted in the video by a white painted face.

=== Mourning A Living Man, 2013 ===
The two-channel video shows two performers toggling between roles—father, wife, adult lesbian, child—to paint a picture of dysfunctional domesticity, tainted by miscommunication, incest, and adultery.

=== Mshoga Mpya (The New Homosexual), 2014 ===
A response to the outlawing of homosexuality in Kenya. This is highly intimate on two levels. First, the performance can be experienced by only one person at a time. The single audience member comes face-to-face with the artist in an enclosed cubicle. Second, during the performance itself, Malinda becomes a vessel through which lived experiences of LGBT individuals are encountered by the one-person audience. The stories were collected by the artist in Nairobi. She accosts this silence by performing her gathered conversations while concurrently preserving the privacy of the individual life stories through the small performance space. Half of Malinda's face is painted with the rainbow flag associated with the LGBT community. She wears gender neutral clothing and a small afro wig to convey androgyny. This suggests that the performance is not so much about gender as it is about the life stories of LGBT individuals being shared.

These are just a few of her works, she utilizes many different mediums such as music, drawing and painting, installation and ceramics.

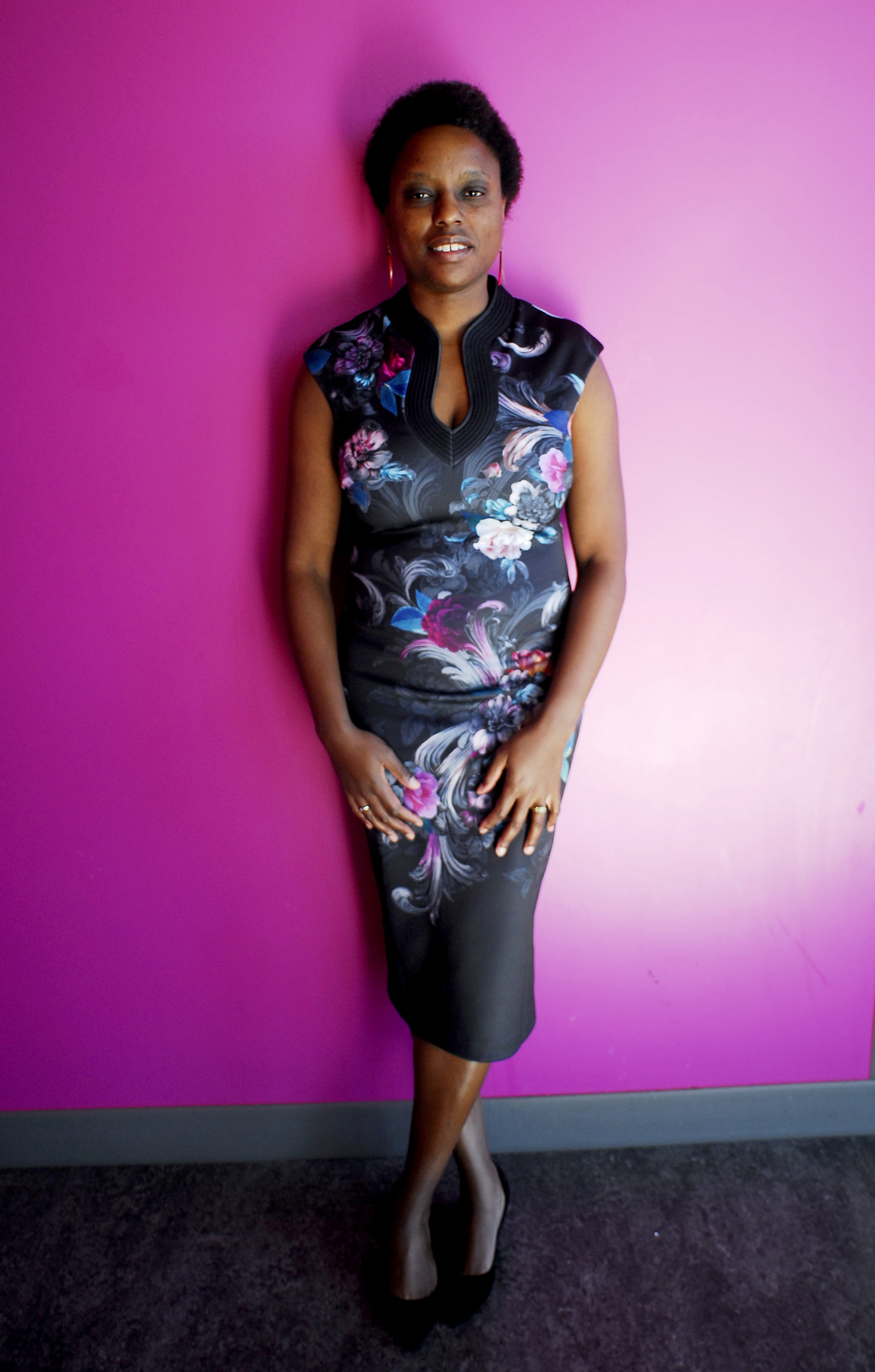

== Artistic influences ==
A recurrent theme in many of Ato's art works is identity: female identity, black identity, African identity, cultural identity. She has, among other things, examined “africanity”, female stereotyping, women's role and social status in Kenya, but also the influence of architecture on the formation of identity. Like Ato before, Alex dwells in the realm of African Art. That is to say, we know that there are artists who are ‘from Africa’. There is also a vast infrastructure of institutions that specialize in ‘African Art’. And more often than not, artists from Africa are condemned to dwell within that infrastructure, because it gives opportunities. But epistemically speaking, African Art is a highly undefined and unspecified term. As already convincingly argued by the Congolese-U.S. scholar Valentin-Yves Mudimbe decades ago, the idea of an African culture is a Eurocentric concept haunted by colonial thought. It is carried on in museums that ‘do’ African art even though their presence beholds qualities of synecdoche – objects become representational for the culture of a continent.

== Further reading and notable publications ==
The following are publications that note the artist as well give an intellectual perspective on her art.

- "'This work tells a story of African hybridity.': In Conversation with Ato Malinda". Contemporary And. March 26, 2014.
- Local Voices in the Scholarly Discourse on Art Studies in Kenya: A Postcolonial Enigma by Kwame Amoah Labi, Journal of African Art History and Visual Culture, 2017
- Political Independence, Personal Independence: An Art Historical Perspective on Contemporary Kenya and the Avant-Gardes by Pierre-Nicolas Bounakoff, Journal of African Art History and Visual Culture, 2017
- African Artists Make Their Mark, Overcome Adversity by Sarafina Wright, Washington Informer, 2016
- Arts & Entertainment: The New Face of African Art --- Collectors are discovering Africa, where new galleries, museums and fairs are flourishing by Kelly Crow, Wall Street Journal, 2016
- An Artist's Perspective on Africa at the Armory: An Interview with Ato Malinda, by Joseph Underwood, 2016
- The Divine Comedy: Heaven, Purgatory and Hell Revisited by Contemporary African Artists by Allison Moore, Critical Interventions: The Africa-Italy Connection, 2016
- Ato Malinda on sexuality, African feminism and performance as art – interview, Art Radar, 2014
- Globalizing East African Culture: From Junk to jua kali Art by Swigert-Gacheru, Margaretta, Perspectives on Global Development and Technology, 2011
- The scars of dissipation: memory, catharsis and the search for the aesthetic by Jimmy Ogonga, African Identities, 2011
