= Osinachi (digital artist) =

Nigerian visual artist (born 1991)

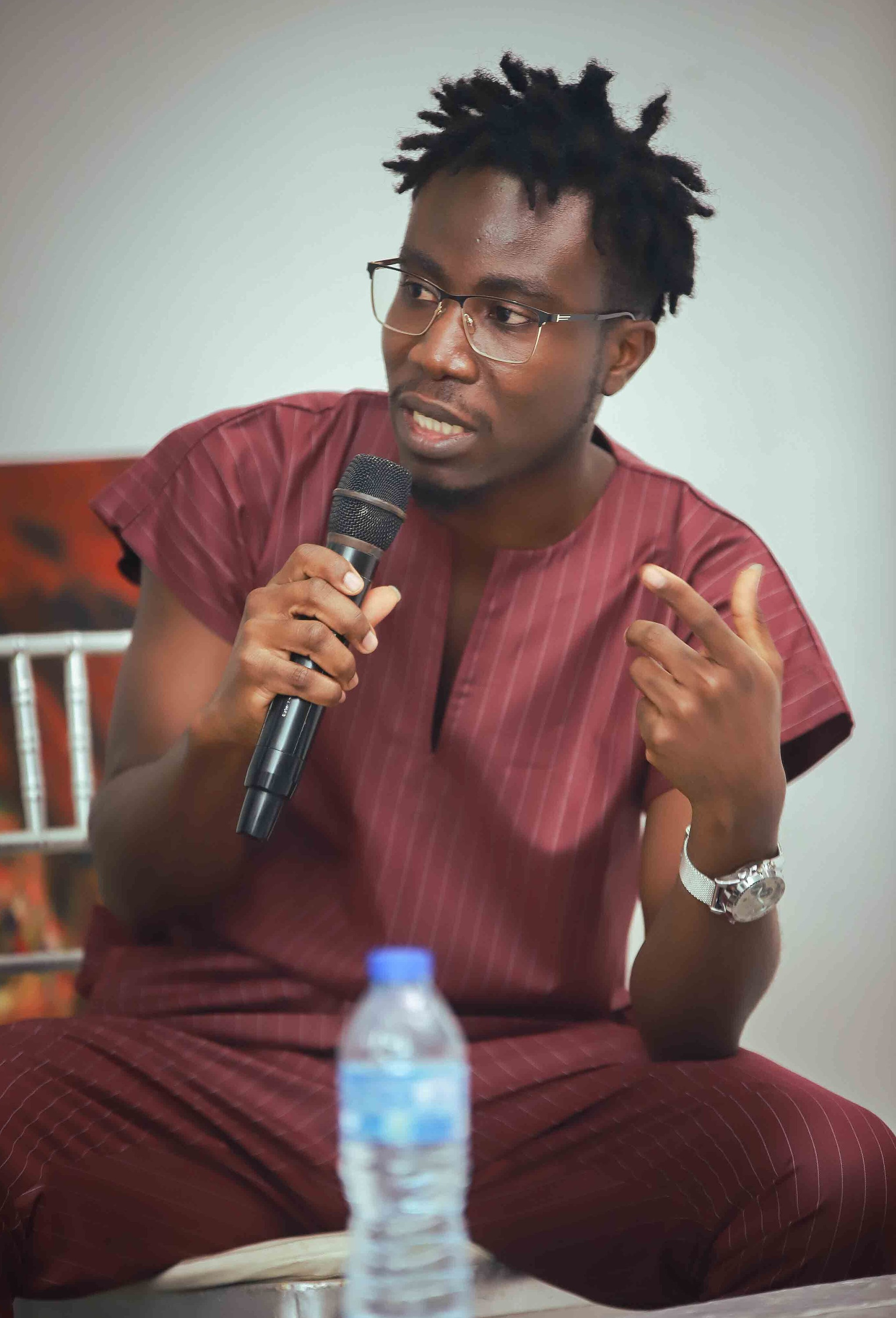
- Born: Aba, Nigeria
- Education: University of Nigeria Nsukka
- Website: https://osinachi.com

Prince Jacon Osinachi Igwe (born in 1991), commonly known as Osinachi, is a Nigerian visual and digital artist. Described as "Africa's foremost crypto artist," he often uses Microsoft Word as his medium. Osinachi was the first African artist to have his work digitally auctioned as an NFT by Christie's in Europe.

== Early life ==
Growing up, Osinachi occasionally wrote poems and short stories before discovering his artistic voice while practicing on his computer's Microsoft Word.

He briefly worked in the Civil Service before committing fully to arts career.

== Education ==
Osinachi gained admission in University of Nigeria Nsukka to study library and information science.

== Career ==
Osinachi entered the crypto art scene in 2017. In 2020, he held his debut solo show, Osinachi: Existence as Protest, at the Kate Vass Galerie in Zürich, Switzerland. In 2021, Osinachi garnered attention for selling $75,000 worth of NFTs in 10 days.

Osinachi partnered with the Mohamed Amin Foundation to release NFTs for a catalog featuring 2.5 million photographs and over 5,000 hours of video content. The project launched $Afrofuture, an Ethereum-based social currency.

In 2021, 1-54 Contemporary African Art Fair and Christie's collaborated on an online auction of Osinachi's NFT series Different Shades of Water, making it the first NFT by a contemporary African artist to be offered by Christie's in Europe. The series was inspired by David Hockney's Portrait of an Artist (Pool with Two Figures) (1972), and the works were exhibited at Somerset House in London.

== Work and reception ==
Osinachi's work has been described as "engagingly political, drawing from conversations on political matters, gender, tradition and race." Writing about the art market in 2020, curator Jason Bailey called Osinachi "the best of what the coming generation of artists has to offer."

=== Osinachi: 'The other Pool Day' ===
In 2023, Osinachi's, The Other Pool Day an accompanying print of the Non-fungible token bearing the Nigerian artist signature was published by Taschen a German art-book publishing company as a book titled On NFTs: Art Edition No1-100 documenting profiles of 101 key artists in the NFT space, 10 academic essays on arts and the first of its kind survey in the arts contemporary medium. The print was available for purchase at $2,500 in crypto.

=== Abitt: The Second Renaissance is Coming ===
In 2023 Toledo Museum of Arts, Ohio announced that it will host the inaugural digital artist -in-residence as part of a strategy to integrate digital arts. Osinachi will be named as digital artist-in-residence affording him with an opportunity to explore stained glass and other physical materials. After eight months in Ohio, he completed Abitt: The Second Renaissance is Coming a characteristically vibrant portrait of a figure outside in a city with highway signs opposite a street art mural which was auctioned by Christie's. Osinachi during an art event said:

The artist served as the digital artist in residence at the Toledo Museum of Art in Toledo, Ohio, for a nine-month period concluding in December. This marked the artist's first time in the United States. The museum initiated the residency as part of a deliberate effort to engage with digital art, rather than responding to trends, while also supporting local artists.

== Collaborations with Afrobeats ==
A record label, Mavin Records collaborated with Osinachi in 2021 going on to merge and mint animated digital arts with Afrobeats music produced by record label executive, Don Jazzy.

== Artistic style and themes ==
Osinachi creates digital artworks primarily using Microsoft Word, a medium he has described as both unconventional and accessible. His use of word-processing software instead of traditional graphic design tools has drawn attention within contemporary digital art discourse and has become a defining feature of his practice.

His works frequently explore themes of identity, race, gender, sexuality, and human relationships, often reflecting on social expectations and lived experiences within African societies. Critics have noted that his figures are often depicted in intimate domestic or social settings, using digital composition to examine visibility, vulnerability, and belonging.

Osinachi's artistic practice has also been associated with the growth of blockchain-based art markets in Africa, where his adoption of non-fungible tokens (NFTs) helped broaden international visibility for African digital artists.

== Exhibitions ==
=== Solo ===
- 2020: OSINACHI: Existence as Protest at Kate Vas Galerie, Zurich
- 2025: Iconoclast, Kate Vas Galerie, Digital Art Mile, Art Basel Week, Basel, Switzerland

=== Group ===
- 2019: Daydreaming, Artoja, Lagos, Nigeria
- 2021: Reloading...., Art x Lagos, Lagos, Nigeria
- 2021: Different Shades of Water at Somerset House with Christie's and 1-54, London
- 2023: Postcard, Museum of Modern Art (MoMA), New York, USA
- 2023: Breadcrumbs: Arts in the Age of NFTism, Nagel Draxler Galerie, Berlin
- 2023: Block Party: Encountering NFTs in the Middle East at Art Dubai
- 2023: The Next Wave: Miami Edit, Christie's, Faena Forum, Miami, USA
- 2023: How High the Moon, Elsewhere (The NFT Gallery), New York, USA
- 2023: A Digital Transcendence: The Intersection of Art and Tech; SuperRare, O×17 Gallery, New York
- 2023: Peer-to-Peer, Buffalo AKG Art Museum, Buffalo, USA
- 2023: Africa Here, MakersPlace, SCOPE Art Show, Miami, USA
- 2023: Web to Verse, Modal Gallery, the School of Digital Arts, Manchester Metropolitan University, Manchester, England
- 2024: SuperRare × CoCollectors, LUME Studios, New York, USA
- 2024: Untitled Art Fair, Kate Vas Galerie, Miami, USA
- 2025: MASCULINITY, Quantum Galerie, Berlin
- 2025: Neo-Techne: Art in the Age of the Machine, Museum of Art and Light, Manhattan, USA

== Collections ==
- Museum of Art and Light, Manhattan, USA
- Museum of Modern Arts (MoMA) Post-Card Project, New York
- Museum of Crypto Arts (MoCA)
- Toledo Museum of Art, Ohio
- Buffalo AKG Art Museum, New York
- Batsoupyum
- Artnome

== Art Residency ==
- 2023: Digital Artist-in-Residence at Toledo Museum of Art, Ohio
- 2025: Artist-in-Residence at Rockefeller Belliago, Lake Como Italy

== Recognition ==
Osinachi was named one of the 100 most influential Africans of 2022 by New Africa for "breaking Africa's crypto boundaries". He was a finalist for the 2019 Bridgeman Studio Award.

== Personal life ==
Osinachi is Igbo. His studio is based in Lagos.

== Influences ==
When asked in an interview about artists that have influenced his process and style of work, Osinachi mentioned Nigeria visual artist Njideka Akunyili Crosby, American trio Tschabalala Self, Devan Shimoyama, Kehinde Wiley.

== Publications ==
- Lorenz, Trish (2022). Speaking Out: Osinachi on Art and Nigerian Identity. Cambridge University Press. ISBN 9781009211857.
- Alice, Robert (2023). On NFTs. Art Edition No. 1-100, Osinachi 'The Other Pool Day'. Taschen. ISBN 9783836596756.
