= Modupeola Fadugba =

Nigerian painter

- Born: 1985 (age 40–41); Togo
- Citizenship: Nigerian
- Education: University of Delaware (MA, Economics); Harvard University (MEd)
- Occupations: Painter, multimedia artist
- Known for: Painting; mixed-media art
- Notable work: Dreams from the Deep End (2018)
- Awards: Grand Prize, Dakar Biennale (2016); El Anatsui's Outstanding Production Prize (2014)
- Website: modupeola.com

Modupeola Fadugba (born 1985, Togo) is a self-taught Nigerian multi-media artist, living and working in Nigeria.

== Early life and Education ==
Fadugba's parents were Nigerian Diplomats, and she spent most of her youth in England and the United States. She studied engineering, economics, and education. She received an MA in Economics from the University of Delaware, and holds an MEd from Harvard University.

== Career ==
Fadugba is a self-taught artist whose series Dreams from the Deep End, developed during a residency at the International Studio and Curatorial Program in New York, was included in a solo exhibit at Gallery 1957. Her solo shows include Heads Up, Keep Swimming at Temple Muse in Lagos in 2017, Synchronised Swimming & Drowning at Ed Cross Fine Art in London in 2017, Prayers, Players & Swimmers at the Cité internationale des arts in Paris in 2017, and Dreams from the Deep End in New York in 2018, which was reviewed in ArtForum International. She has participated in numerous group shows, including the Royal Academy Summer Exhibition in London in 2017, Afriques Capitales in Lille, France in 2017, and the Art Energy in London in 2015.

Fadugba's work was selected in the 2016 Dakar Biennale, where she was awarded a Grand Prize from the Senegal Minister of Communication. Her project The People’s Algorithm received the 2014 El Anatsu’s Outstanding Production Prize. Her painting Teach Us How To Shoki In Pink appeared on the front cover of Arabia's Harper's Bazaar in April 2018. Her work is included in the collection of the Smithsonian National Museum of African Art, the University of Delaware, the Sindika Dokolo Foundation and the Liberian President, Ellen Johnson Sirleaf Fadugba held a Smithsonian Institution Research Fellowship in 2020. The same year she held residency at Headlands Center for the Arts.

== Dreams from the Deep End and The Harlem Honeys & Bears ==
In the summer of 2018, Fadugba spent some time with the Harlem Honeys & Bears, while attending a residency program at the International Studio and Curatorial Program in New York. Dreams from the Deep End was the resulting painting series and installation, first shown at Gallery 1957 in Accra, Ghana. The Harlem Honeys & Bears is an all black synchronized swim team for senior citizens that meets at the Hansborough Recreation Center in New York City. The team has been in existence since 1979, and as of 2018, had 24 active members with ages ranging from 58 to 95, who met and competed on a regular basis.

The painting series based on Fadugba's research with the group, is both personal and tied to identity politics of Black America. Swimming is intertwined with race, and social justice in the US. Research from the CDC shows that drowning among black children is 1.4 times higher than the rate of white children. The rate climbs to a 5.5 times difference when the research considers swimming pool drowning deaths. The disparity is a legacy of segregation in the US, where black communities were denied access to public swimming pools. For the artist, swimming is tied to a childhood fear of the ocean, which she only overcame when she was 11, and was forced to take swimming lessons in school.

Dreams from the Deep End depicts the Harlem Honeys & Bears swimmers in and around the swimming pool. In some of the paintings, the figures remain faceless, and the artist tends to use pastel colors, and her signature burnt technique. In others, she shows the faces of the swimmers on which the paintings are based, sometimes using the burning method, sometimes without. The pool water is usually monochromatic: dark blue, black, or gold, making the swimmers stand out starkly from the background.
