= Bisi Silva =

Nigerian contemporary art curator

Olabisi Obafunke Silva
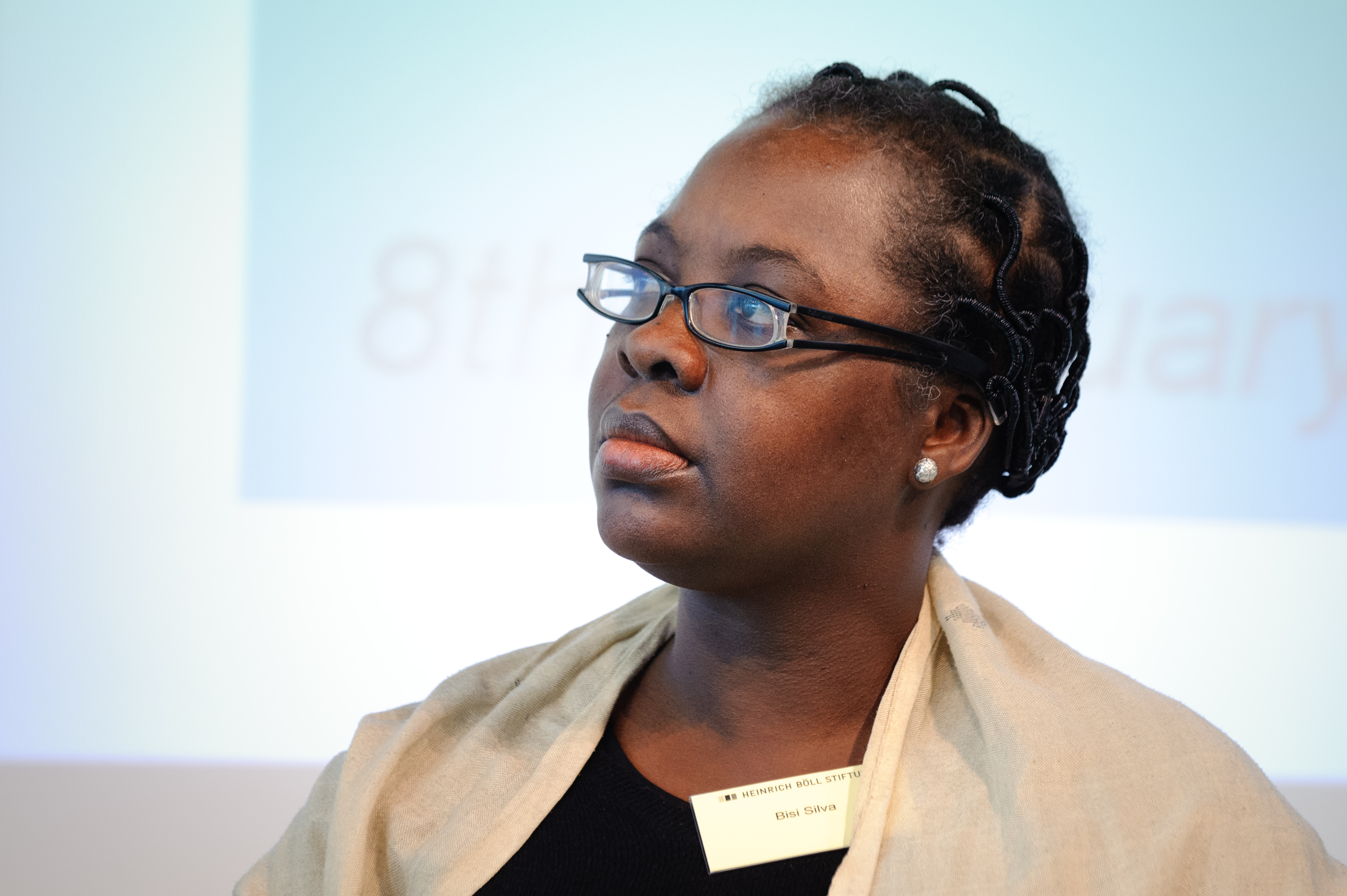
- Silva (2012)
- Born: 29 May 1962
- Died: 12 February 2019 (aged 56); Lagos, Nigeria
- Other name: Bisi Silva
- Education: Royal College of Art, London
- Known for: Founding the Centre for Contemporary Art, Lagos; founding the Asiko Art School

Olabisi Obafunke Silva (29 May 1962 – 12 February 2019), known as Bisi Silva, was a Nigerian contemporary art curator based in Lagos.

== Early life and education ==
Bisi Silva graduated with an MA in Visual Arts Administration: Curating and Commissioning Contemporary Art at the Royal College of Art, London, in 1996.

== Career ==
In the early days of her career, Silva worked as an independent curator and founded Fourth Dial Art, a non-profit project in London dedicated to promoting and cultivating cultural practice in the visual arts, and to help artists form meaningful collaborations with artistic institutions and professionals. One of the outcomes of Fourth Dial Art was a traveling exhibition, "Heads of State”, featuring the work of Faisal Abdu'Allah, who was then an emerging artist of the London art world.

Silva visited Lagos, Nigeria in 1999 with the idea of starting a project there. She was the founder and artistic director of the Centre for Contemporary Art, Lagos (CCA, Lagos), which opened in December 2007. CCA Lagos promotes research, documentation and exhibitions related to contemporary art in Africa and abroad. At CCA, Lagos, Silva curated numerous exhibitions, including one with the Nigerian painter Ndidi Dike. Silva was also the founder of the Asiko Art School, which describes itself as "part art workshop, part residency, and part art academy."

Silva was co-curator of "The Progress of Love”, a transcontinental collaboration across three venues in the United States and Nigeria (October 2012 – January 2013). Silva was co-curator of J. D. 'Okhai Ojeikere: Moments of Beauty, Kiasma, Helsinki (April – November 2011). She was also co-curator for the second Thessaloniki Biennale of Contemporary Art, Greece, Praxis: Art in Times of Uncertainty in September 2009. In 2006, Silva was one of the curators for the Dakar Biennale in Senegal. In collaboration with the Portuguese art critic Isabel Carlos, she selected artists for the third Artes Mundi prize in Wales. She also curated Contact Zone: Contemporary Art from West and North Africa (October 2007) and an exhibition titled Telling ... Contemporary Finnish photography, in the Seventh Biennial of African Photography in Bamako (November 2007).

Silva wrote on contemporary art for international publications, including Art Monthly, Untitled, Third Text, M Metropolis, Agufon and for Nigerian newspapers such as This Day. She was on the editorial board of n.paradoxa, an international feminist art journal, and was the guest editor for the Africa and African diaspora issue of n.paradoxa (January 2013).

Silva died in Lagos, Nigeria, at the age of 56 after a four-year battle with breast cancer.

== Legacy ==
Curators Nina Zimmer and Touria El Glaoui named Silva among the decade's most influential curators.

== Exhibitions curated or co-curated ==
=== 2009 ===
- In the Light of Play, Durban Art Gallery and Johannesburg Art Fair
- Chance Encounters, Seven Contemporary Artists from Africa, Sakshi Gallery, Mumbai India e Sakshi Gallery, Taipei, Taiwan
- Like A Virgin ..., Lucy Azubuike (NIG) and Zanele Muholi (SA), CCA, Lagos
- Praxis: Art in Times of Uncertainty, Second Thessaloniki Biennale of Contemporary Art, Greece
- Maputo: A tale of One City, Oslo, part of the Africa in Oslo season.

=== 2008 ===
- George Osodi, Paradise Lost: Revisiting the Niger Delta, CCA, Lagos
- Ndidi Dike, Waka-into-bondage: The Last ¾ Mile, CCA, Lagos

=== 2007 ===
- Fela, Ghariokwu Lemi and The Art of the Album Cover, CCA, Lagos
- Contact Zone: Contemporary Art from West and North Africa, National Museum of Mali
- Telling... Contemporary Finnish photography, Settima Biennale di Fotografia Africana, Bamako

=== 2006 ===
- Dak'Art, Biennale di Dakar, Senegal

== Bibliography ==
- Jayne O. Ifekwunigwe: Mixed Race Studies: A Reader — Routledge, 2004. ISBN 0-415-32163-8
