= Wura-Natasha Ogunji =

- Born: 1970 (age 55–56)
- Education: Stanford University, San Jose State University
- Known for: Performance art, video art

Wura-Natasha Ogunji (born 1970) is an artist and performer based in Lagos, Nigeria and Austin, Texas; she is of Nigerian descent.

== Education ==
Ogunji received a BA from Stanford University in 1992 and a MFA from San Jose State University in 1998.

== Work and career ==
Ogunji works in a variety of mediums but is best known for her performative and video-based works. Her artistic themes include physicality and the body, and our relationship to space, memory, and history. Her recent work deals with women occupying the public space of Lagos. Recently, she also started incorporating thread, graphic, and ink to create pieces showcasing the physicality of a woman's body.

Ogunji has been a visiting lecturer at the Center for Art of Africa and its Diasporas (CAAD) at the University of Texas at Austin and was awarded the Guggenheim Fellowship in 2012. Her work has been featured in exhibitions at the Seattle Art Museum, Brooklyn Art Museum, Menil Collection, Louisiana Museum of Modern Art, Musée d’Art Moderne de la Ville de Paris, and the Palais de Tokyo. Throughout her career, she has also participated in art events such as the Biennale of Sydney, Stellenbosch Triennale, Bienal de São Paulo, and the Kochi-Muziris Biennale.

In 2023, Ogunji made her New York Solo debut at the Fridman Gallery.
