= List of Nigerian artists =

This is a list of artists who were born in Nigeria or whose artworks are closely associated with the country. Artists are listed by field of study and then by last name in alphabetical order, and they may be listed more than once, if they work in many fields of study.

== Interdisciplinary artists ==
- Wilfred Ukpong, Nigerian-born French interdisciplinary artist and researcher

== Painters and drawers ==
- Ade Adekola (born 1966), conceptual artist, and painter
- Tayo Adenaike (born 1954), painter
- Alimi Adewale (born 1974), painter
- Ayo Akínwándé, drawings and works on paper, printmaker
- Olu Ajayi (born 1963), painter, cartoonist, and art critic.
- Samson Akinnire (born 1986), painter, and sculptor
- Kelechi Amadi-Obi (born 1969), photographer, painter, and magazine publisher
- Chike Aniakor (born 1939), painter
- Kingsley Ayogu (born 1994), painter of hyperrealistic works
- Samson Bakare (born 1993), painter and sculptor
- Jimoh Buraimoh (born 1943), painter
- Chinwe Chukwuogo-Roy (1952–2012), Nigerian-born English figurative painter
- Fola David (born 1993), scientific illustrator, medical doctor, painter
- Daddy K (born 1989), Nigerian-born painter, living in Dubai
- Dipo Doherty (born 1991), hyperrealistic painter
- George Edozie (born 1972), painter
- Emmanuel Eni (born 1967), Nigerian-born German painter, sculptor, multimedia artist, and performance artist
- Ben Enwonwu (1917–1994), painter, and sculptor
- Stella Fakiyesi (born c. 1971), painter, photographer, and cinematographer
- Lemi Ghariokwu (born 1955), painter, illustrator, graphic designer
- Dele Jegede (born 1945), painter, art historian, cartoonist, curator, art critic, art administrator, and teacher
- Emmanuel Taiwo Jegede (born 1943), painter, poet, storyteller, printmaker, and a sculptor
- Marcia Kure (born 1970), Nigerian-born mixed media painter and illustrator
- Wole Lagunju (born 1966), visual artist
- Ken Nwadiogbu (born 1994), Nigerian-born painter, and sculptor, based in London
- Tony Nsofor (born 1973), painter
- Nkiru Nzegwu (born 1954), painter, philosopher, author, curator, and art historian
- Nsofor Ugochukwu Godwin (born 1985), contemporary visual artist, creative writer, designer, and entrepreneur.
- Gani Odutokun (1946–1995), painter and illustrator
- Chris Ofili (born 1968), British painter of Nigerian descent
- Uche Okeke (1933–2016), Modernist painter, sculptor, illustrator, and teacher
- Ikechukwu Francis Okoronkwo (born 1970), painter, sculptor, and author
- Ebele Okoye (born 1969), Nigerian-born German painter and animator
- Asiru Olatunde (1918–1993), blacksmith and painter
- Oluwole Omofemi (1988), painter, curator, painted the last commsissioned painting of Queen Elizabeth II of England before her demise
- Mike Omoighe (1958–2021), painter, curator, art critic, and teacher
- Nengi Omuku (born 1987), sculptor and painter
- Aina Onabolu (1882–1963), Modernist painter and teacher, he introduced art curriculum to high schools in Nigeria
- Bruce Onobrakpeya (born 1932), painter, printmaker, and sculptor
- Ufuoma Onobrakpeya (born 1971), painter, printmaker, teacher
- Folakunle Oshun (born 1984), painter, sculptor, and curator
- Muraina Oyelami (born 1940), painter and drummer of Yoruba descent
- Laolu Senbanjo (born 1982), American visual artist, musician, singer, songwriter, and attorney; of Yorba Nigerian descent
- Twins Seven Seven (1944–2011), painter, sculptor and musician
- Ada Udechukwu (born 1960), painter and poet
- Obiora Udechukwu (born 1946), painter and poet
- Oscar Ukonu (born 1993), ballpoint pen draftsman
- Etso Ugbodaga-Ngu (1921-1996), painter
- Luke Agada (Born 1992), painter

== Photographers ==
- Jenevieve Aken (born 1989), photographer known for documentary photos, self-portraits and urban photos
- Lola Akinmade Åkerström, Nigerian-born Swedish photographer and travel writer
- Solomon Osagie Alonge (1911–1994), was a self-taught photographer and pioneer of Nigerian photography
- Kelechi Amadi-Obi (born 1969), photographer, painter, and magazine publisher
- Aisha Augie-Kuta (born 1980), photographer and filmmaker
- Nora Awolowo (born 1999), documentary photographer, film director, cinematographer, producer, and creative director
- Yetunde Ayeni-Babaeko (born 1978), photographer
- Ayodeji Awoyomi (born 1990) Fine Art photographer
- Neec Nonso (born 1990), photographer, AR artist
- Adetona Omokanye (born 1990), photographer and photojournalist
- Anny Robert (born 1990), celebrity photographer

== Printmakers ==
- Ayo Akínwándé, printmaker, drawings and works on paper
- Toyin Ojih Odutola (born 1985), Nigerian-born American printmaker, also known for her multimedia drawings and works on paper
- Bruce Onobrakpeya (born 1932), painter, printmaker, and sculptor
- Ufuoma Onobrakpeya (born 1971), painter, printmaker, teacher

== Sculptors ==
- Sunday Jack Akpan, sculptor, known for work in cement
- Jimoh Aliu (1939–2020), sculptor, screenplay writer, playwright and director
- Olu Amoda (born 1959), sculptor, muralist, furniture designer, and multimedia artist
- Sokari Douglas Camp (born 1958), Nigerian-born English sculptor
- Dilomprizulike (born 1960), Nigerian-born German sculptor
- Erhabor Emokpae (1934–1984), sculptor, muralist, graphic artist, and painter
- Emmanuel Eni (born 1967), Nigerian-born German sculptor, painter, multimedia artist, and performance artist
- Akin Fakeye (born 1936), wood carver
- Azeez Kayode Fakeye (born 1965), sculptor
- Lukman Alade Fakeye (born 1983), Yoruba Nigerian sculptor and woodcarver
- Ovia Idah (1903–1968), sculptor
- Emmanuel Taiwo Jegede (born 1943), painter, poet, storyteller, printmaker, and a sculptor
- Folakunle Oshun (born 1984), painter, sculptor, and curator
- Dotun Popoola (born 1981), metal sculptor
- Twins Seven Seven (1944–2011), painter, sculptor and musician
- Yinka Shonibare (born 1962), British sculptor and installation artist, of Nigerian descent

== See also ==
- List of Nigerians
- List of Nigerian women artists
