= List of Nigerian women photographers =

This is a list of women photographers who were born in Nigeria or whose works are closely associated with that country.

== A ==
- Fati Abubakar (fl 2000s), photojournalist and documentary photographer
- Jenevieve Aken (born 1989), documentary and urban portrait photographer
- Lola Akinmade Åkerström (fl 2006), photographer and travel writer based in Stockholm
- Aisha Augie-Kuta (born 1980), photographer, filmmaker
- Yetunde Ayeni-Babaeko (born 1978), commercial photographer

== B ==
- TY Bello (born 1978), singer and photographer

== E ==
- Sokari Ekine (born 1949), activist, blogger, author and photographer
- Yagazie Emezi (born 1989), artist and photojournalist

== F ==
- Fati Abubakar, documentary photographer

== N ==
- Emily Nkanga (born 1995), Nigerian-British photographer and filmmaker
- Amarachi Nwosu (born 1994), Nigerian-American photographer, artist and filmmaker

== O ==
- Ifeoma Onyefulu (born 1959), children's author, novelist, photographer

== S ==
- Taiye Selasi (born 1979), writer, photographer

== See also ==
- List of women photographers
