= Fakeye =

Fákẹ́yẹ
- Gender: Male
- Language: Yoruba

Origin
- Origin: Nigerian
- Meaning: Ifá gathered honour.
- Region of origin: South West, Nigeria

Fákẹ́yẹ audio is a Nigerian surname. It is a male name and of Yoruba origin, which means "Ifá gathered honour.". Fákẹ́yẹ is a powerful name with depth and profound meaning. The diminutive form is Ifákẹ́yẹ, same meaning but in full form.

== Notable individuals with the name ==
- Lamidi Olonade Fakeye (1925 – 2009), Nigerian sculptor and academic.
- Oyindamola Fakeye, Nigerian creative director.
- Akin Fakeye (born 1936), Nigerian carver.
- Lukman Alade Fakeye (born 1983), Nigerian carver.
- Azeez Kayode Fakeye (born 1965), Nigerian carver.
- Gabriel Olubunmi Fakeye (1936 - 2015), Nigerian Prophet.
