= Folakunle Oshun =

Nigerian visual artist

- Born: Nigeria
- Education: University of Lagos
- Occupations: Visual artist, sculptor and curator
- Known for: Lagos Biennal, Potsdam Curator Award 2017
- Website: www.folakunleoshun.com

Folakunle Oshun is a Nigerian contemporary visual artist, sculptor and curator. He is the founder and director of Lagos Biennal, an organisation that provides an avenue for dialogue and development of contemporary African arts. Oshun works have been featured in many local and international exhibitions.

== Early life and education ==
Folakunle Oshun was born and brought up in Ibadan Oyo State, Nigeria. He attended the University of Lagos, where he studied B.A. in Fine Arts (2004 -2007) and M.A. in Art History (2008–2012).

== Exhibitions ==
Selected curatorial:

- Afrique 2020 season in France 2021
- Look at This Pinakothek der Moderne, Munich 2021.
- Museum of Hope, Berliner Dom 2021
- 'How to Build a Lagoon With Just A Bottle of Wine?' Lagos Biennial, Lagos (Nigeria) 2019.
- Living on the Edge, Lagos Biennial, Lagos 2017.
- Dak’art 2016

== See also ==
- Lemi Ghariokwu
- Ade Adekola
- Nengi Omuku
