= Ayo Akínwándé =

Nigerian visual artist

Ayọ̀ Akínwándé
- Born: Lagos, Nigeria
- Education: Covenant University
- Occupations: Visual artist and writer
- Known for: Edith Russ-Haus 2020 Media Art Award Oldenburg, Germany; Place Publique Prize 2019, Fonderie Darling Montréal, Canada
- Website: ayoakinwande.com

Ayọ̀ Akínwándé (born in Lagos, Nigeria) is a Nigerian contemporary visual artist, curator, and writer. He is known for his vivid multimedia drawings and works on paper.

== Early life and education ==
Ayọ̀ Akínwándé was born and brought up in Lagos, Nigeria. He studied Architecture from Covenant University Nigeria.

== Exhibitions ==
Selected solo exhibitions:

- Power Show III - The God-Fathers Must Be Crazy, Darling Foundry Montreal Quebec, Canada 2019.
- the artist isn't present, The Gallow Gate, Glasgow 2019.
- Power Show II: The God-Fathers Are Not To Blame, Revolving Art Incubator, Lagos (Nigeria) 2018.
- Power Show I, Omenka Gallery, Lagos (Nigeria) 2018.
- Deaf vs Dumb II, National Museum, Lagos 2017.

== Publications ==
- 2019 “Victor Ehikhamenor: From the Village to the World, and Back Again”, The Art Momentum.
- 2018 Confronting an Unaddressed Nigerian Reality in the Exhibition ‘Salvage Therapy’ The Sole Adventurer.
- 2020 "Who Art Exhibition Epp?”, People's Stories Project.

== See also ==
- Lemi Ghariokwu
- Ade Adekola
