= Olatunde =

Olatunde is a given name and surname. Notable people with the name include:

- O-T Fagbenle (Olatunde Olateju Olaolorun Fagbenle; born 1981) English actor, writer and director
- Olatunde C. Johnson (born 1968), American legal scholar
- Olatunde Ojo (born 1963), Nigerian architect
- Olatunde Osunsanmi (born 1977), American film and television director and producer
- Asiru Olatunde (1918–1993), Nigerian artist, blacksmith, and painter
- Ganiyu Olatunji Olatunde, Nigerian educator
- Israel Olatunde (born 2002), Irish track and field athlete
