= Alonge =

- Language: Yoruba

Origin
- Region of origin: West Africa

Alonge is a Yoruba surname. Notable people with the surname include:

- Adebayo Alonge, Nigerian pharmacist
- Solomon Osagie Alonge, pioneer of Nigerian photography.
