= Dipo (name) =

Dipo is a masculine given name. Notable people with the name include:

- Dipo Akinyemi (born 1997), English footballer
- Dipo Dina (1960–2010) was a Nigerian politician
- Dipo Doherty (born 1991), Nigerian painter
- Dipo Satria Ramli (born 1984), economist
