= Ikechukwu Francis Okoronkwo =

Nigerian painter

- Born: Ikechukwu; 1970 (age 55–56); Oguta
- Citizenship: Nigeria
- Education: University of Port Harcourt University of Nigeria
- Occupations: Visual artist, painter, Sculptor

Ikechukwu Francis Okoronkwo (born 27 May 1970) is a Nigerian visual artist, painter, sculptor and author.

== Early life and education ==
Ikechukwu was born on 27 May 1970 into the family of Francis Okoronkwo in Oguta, Nigeria. He graduated with B.A. Creative Arts from the University of Port-Harcourt in 1995 and in 2001, he completed his M.A. Fine Art from University of Nigeria, Nsukka.

== Exhibitions ==
Ikechukwu Francis Okoronkwo has exhibited in various local and international solo and group exhibitions, some of which include: Created For A Purpose (With David Enyi) B.V.L, Port-Harcourt 1997, Terrain Of The Mind Ondo. Ondo State 1996,Views (With Jumah Ibeagbazi) Alliance Francaise, Kaduna State 2004, A Village Square. Omega Gallery, Sheraton Hotels and Towers Abuja 2005, DUTA, Biennale des Arts Visuels, Bonapriso Center For the Arts. Douala, Cameroon 2007, A Glimpse into Nigerian Art. Cheikh Anta DIOP University, Dakar, Senegal 2006.

== Writings ==
Ikechukwu Francis Okoronkwo first published book is Petals and Thorns, a collection of poems to honour the people he referred to as close to his heart and who have helped him while growing up.

== See also ==
- Ade Adekola
- Nengi Omuku
- Lemi Ghariokwu
