= Olajumoke =

- Gender: Female
- Language: Yoruba

Origin
- Origin: Yorubaland
- Meaning: the wealth that everyone cherishes
- Region of origin: Yorubaland [Nigeria, Benin, Togo]

Other names
- Variant form: Jumoke

listen

Olajumoke is a feminine given name of Yoruba origin meaning “the wealth that everyone cherishes.”

Gloss:

Ọlá - wealth

jùmọ̀ - together, jointly

kẹ́ - cherish

Given name

- Olajumoke Adenowo (born 1968), Nigerian architect, entrepreneur, and philanthropist
- Olajumoke Bodunrin (born 1945), Nigerian sprinter
- Olajumoke Okoya-Thomas, Nigerian politician
- Olajumoke Orisaguna (born 1989), Nigerian model
- Oluwafunmilayo Olajumoke Atilade (born 1952), Nigerian judge

Surname

- Queen Olajumoke (born 1980), Female Athlete, Model, Actress, Socialite, second generation USA citizen of Nigerian origin, et al.
- Bode Olajumoke, Nigerian politician
