= Ufuoma (given name) =

- Gender: Unisex
- Language: Isoko

Origin
- Language: Delta State
- Origin: Nigeria
- Meaning: Peace
- Region of origin: Southern Nigeria

listen

In Isoko the name Ufuoma means "Peace". It is a common name that reflects their belief in maintaining peace and being at peace. It is a unisex name.

Notable people with the name include:

- Ufuoma McDermott, Nigerian actress
- Kevin Akpoguma, footballer
- Ufuoma Onobrakpeya, Nigerian painter
- Rosaline Meurer, actress
- Victor Thompson (musician), Nigerian gospel singer
