= Sunday Emmanuel =

Sunday Emmanuel or Emmanuel Sunday may refer to:

- Emmanuel Sunday (artist) (born 1955), Nigerian artist also known as Lemi Ghariokwu
- Sunday Emmanuel (athlete) (1978–2004), Nigerian athlete and sprinter
- Sunday Emmanuel (footballer) (born 1992), Nigerian footballer
