= Alimi Adewale =

Nigerian painter

- Born: May 8, 1974 (age 52); Lagos, Nigeria
- Education: Degree in Mechanical Engineering, University of Ilorin; Apprenticeship under Kamoru Sarumi, Yaba, Lagos; Art workshops worldwide
- Known for: Works exploring urban issues, everyday city life, and nudes in African art
- Notable work: Exhibitions on carnival, living spaces, and urban congestion (Quintessence Gallery, 2011)
- Style: Painting; Contemporary visual art
- Movement: Contemporary African art

Alimi Adewale (born May 8, 1974) is a Nigerian contemporary visual artist and painter. His works explore topical urban issues, documentation of everyday city people, and the controversial subject of ‘Nudes in African Art’ as a form of expression.

Alimi Adewale was born in Lagos, Nigeria and first studied mechanical engineering. He grew interested in art from visiting exhibitions and honed his knowledge and skills by attending art workshops around the world.

In 2024, his art was featured in the 1-54 contemporary African Art Fair held annually in London as part of Frieze Week.

== Education ==
Adewale had a degree in mechanical engineering from University of Ilorin, Nigeria. He did his National Youth Service [NYSC] in 2002 and he was posted to Enugu. He has Interest in art and going to exhibitions also developed his interest in art and after graduating from university, he enrolls as an apprentice under Kamoru Sarumi in the Yaba area of Lagos

== Career ==
In 2009, he became a fulltime artist after resigning from his job.

in 2011, he launched a sublime exhibition at Quintessence Gallery that exhibited carnival, Living Spaces and Urban Congestion.

In 2016, Adewale participated in the Konstepidemins residency programme in Sweden, and the following year he was an artist-in-residence at Miliki in Lagos. His works have been exhibited internationally at venues including the Anima Gallery, Belvedere Artspace, Galleri Astley, Just Africa in Stockholm, and Alara. He has also participated in numerous art fairs worldwide in collaboration with Nil Gallery Paris .

== See also ==
- Nengi Omuku
- Stella Fakiyesi
