= Ufuoma Onobrakpeya =

Nigerian painter, printmaker and academic

Ufuoma Isioro Onobrakpeya (born 1971), is a Nigerian painter, printmaker and teacher of art. Ufuoma is a 3rd generation artist, whose grandfather Obi Omonedo Onobrakpeya was a carver. While growing up he was also art apprentice to his father Bruce Onobrakpeya for a period of 2 decades.

== Biography ==
Ufuoma Onobrakpeya was born 21 February 1971, in Lagos, Nigeria. His father is artist Bruce Onobrakpeya. He graduated from the University of Benin in 1995, with an honours degree in fine Art, specializing in painting, with Prof. Irein Wangboje as one of his major influencers while in Benin. In 2002 he obtained a master's degree in art, specializing in printmaking, from the Camberwell College of Arts, University of Arts London, England in 2002, where the legendary Nigerian artist Ben Osawe had also attended in the 60s. While studying and creating art in London, Prof. Paul Coldwell described his works thus "His work was reminiscent of the work of British Pop artists who were so much part of presenting Images of swinging London in the 1960s".

Ufuoma is married.

His work is in the public collection at All Saints Church Yaba, Lagos which contain his "14 Stations of the Cross" painting series (2005 )

== Exhibitions ==
In 2005, his print titled "Health Care Immunization" was one of the 12 art works selected to adorn the Guinness 2005 Corporate Calendar. Onobrakpeya like his colleague Mike Omoighe has been a frequent participant at the yearly Harmattan Retreat arranged by the Bruce Onobrakpeya Foundation, in Agbarha-Otor, Delta State. Nigeria. While there, he has acted in several advisory capacities, including being an facilitator in printmaking. He has participated in several group exhibition at home and abroad, including:

- 1998, "New Trends in Nigerian Art"; Texaco Overseas (Nig.) Petroleum Unlimited, 1999 Promoter of Nigerian Art: Bruce Onobrakpeya, Goethe-Institut Lagos, Nigeria,
- 1999, "Amos Tutuola Show – Folklore inspired art in Honour of the novelist" – Aina Onabolu House, National Gallery of Art, National Theatre, Iganmu, Lagos,
- 2000, "Exhibition of paintings, prints sculptures, installations etc". by Otu-Ewena Artists, Aina Onabolu, Building National Theatre Complex, Iganmu, Lagos,
- May 2004, "Art and Democracy", a group exhibition mounted during 5th anniversary of Democracy in Delta State; held at Nelrose Hotel, Asaba, Delta State
- 2004 The Harvest of the Harmattan Retreat Exhibition organized in collaboration with the Pan African University, Lagos,
- May 2012, Bruce Onobrakpeya and the Harmattan Experiment", Exhibition of 20 artists (artists exhibited included Bruce Onobrakpeya, Sam Ovraiti, Duke Asidere, Ufuoma Onobrakpeya and Juliet Ezenwa Maja Pearse and a few other past participants of the Annual Harmattan Workshop) at Kadjinol Station during the Dakar 2012 Biennale, Senegal.

=== Solo exhibitions ===
- 1997, My Genesis ( Lekki Restaurant Gallery) Chevron (Nig.) Ltd.
- 2007, My Environment, My culture, an exhibition of paintings, prints and plastocasts at Terra Kulture Victoria Island, Lagos

== Awards and distinctions ==
- Founding Member of the Annual Harmattan Workshop 1998
- Scholarship to study for Postgraduate Studies in art at Camberwell College of Art, University of Arts London, England, from the Institute of International Education, U.S.A. 2002
