= Ovia Idah =

Nigerian sculptor (1903–1968)

- Born: 1903; Oria, Delta State, Southern Nigeria Protectorate (now Nigeria)
- Died: 1968 (aged 64–65); Nigeria
- Other names: Ovidah Ida, Igbolovia Ida
- Occupations: Sculptor, painter, carpenter, designer, educator
- Movement: Modernism

Chief Ovia Idah (1903–1968) was a Nigerian sculptor, painter, carpenter, designer, and educator. He worked in many mediums including in ebony wood, ivory, plastic, as well as terracotta and cement. Idah's was active in Lagos in Lagos State, and Benin City in Edo State, but showed his work internationally. He is also known by the names Igbolovia Ida and Ovidah Ida.

== Biography ==
He was raised in a royal palace as a court official (or omada) from age 7 until age 15, where he learned carving skills serving as a page under Oba Eweka II of Benin.

Idah was employed as a carpenter with the Public Works Department in Lagos from 1923 until 1947. He also taught at King's College in Lagos. Oba Akenzua II persuaded Idah to lead the Benin Carvers Cooperative in Benin City in 1947.

Idah's sculptures broke from local carving traditions and had their own unique style. He was included as part of the book, "New Currents, Ancient Rivers: Contemporary African Artists in a Generation of Change" (Smithsonian Institution Press, 1992), one of the largest surveys of contemporary African art at the time.

In 2000, Nigerian-American art historian Rowland Abíọ́dún attributed a carved wooden relief panel in the Denver Art Museum's collection to Ovia Idah or artists trained in his workshop. The panel was subsequently included in the Digital Benin project, which documents artworks associated with the Kingdom of Benin.

== See also ==
- Edo people
- List of Nigerian artists
- Kingdom of Benin
