= Stella Fakiyesi =

Nigerian artist (born 1971)

- Born: Stella Fakiyesi c. 1971; Nigeria
- Education: OCAD University
- Occupations: Artist, photographer
- Organization: SOF Art House
- Known for: Photography
- Website: stellafakiyesi.com

Stella Fakiyesi (born c. 1971) is a Nigerian creative photographer, cinematographer and painter. Fakiyesi's works in photography and visual art have been featured in many international exhibitions.

== Biography ==
Fakiyesi was born in Nigeria. She studied photography at Ontario College of Art & Design University from 1993 to 1997. After her graduation in 1997, Fakiyesi started working on her solo career practice in Toronto, Canada. She founded and operated the SOF Art House, a gallery and co-work space for photographers in Toronto from 1999 to 2005.

== Selected exhibitions ==
- 2019 Reflections of Love | Harbourfront Centre
- 2018 - 2019 Everything Remains | Art Gallery of Sudbury
- 2018 Everything Remains | Raw McMichael Gallery.
- 2016 Position As Desired | Exploring African Canadian Identity Art Gallery of Windsor.
- 2012 Position As Desired | Canadian Museum of Immigration Halifax, Nova Scotia.
- 2010 - 2011 Position As Desired | Royal Ontario Museum (ROM) Toronto, Canada.
- 2005 Amiala | Harbourfront Centre Toronto, Canada.
- 1998- 2000 History of African Photography from 1840 to Present group show | Paris, São Paulo, Mexico City, Washington, D.C., Cape Town, South Africa.
- 1999 Portrait Afrika group show | Haus Der Kulturen Der Welt, Berlin.

== See also ==
- Ade Adekola
- Nengi Omuku
