= Azeez Kayode Fakeye =

Nigerian sculptor

Azeez Kayode Fakeye (born 1965), is a Nigerian sculptor.

== Biography ==
Azeez Kayode Fakeye was born in 1965 in Ibadan, Nigeria. The Fakeye family is a multigenerational group of Yoruba sculptors, and he is related to Lamidi Fakeye, Akin Fakeye, and Lukman Alade Fakeye.
