= Kelechi Amadi-Obi =

Nigerian artist (born 1969)

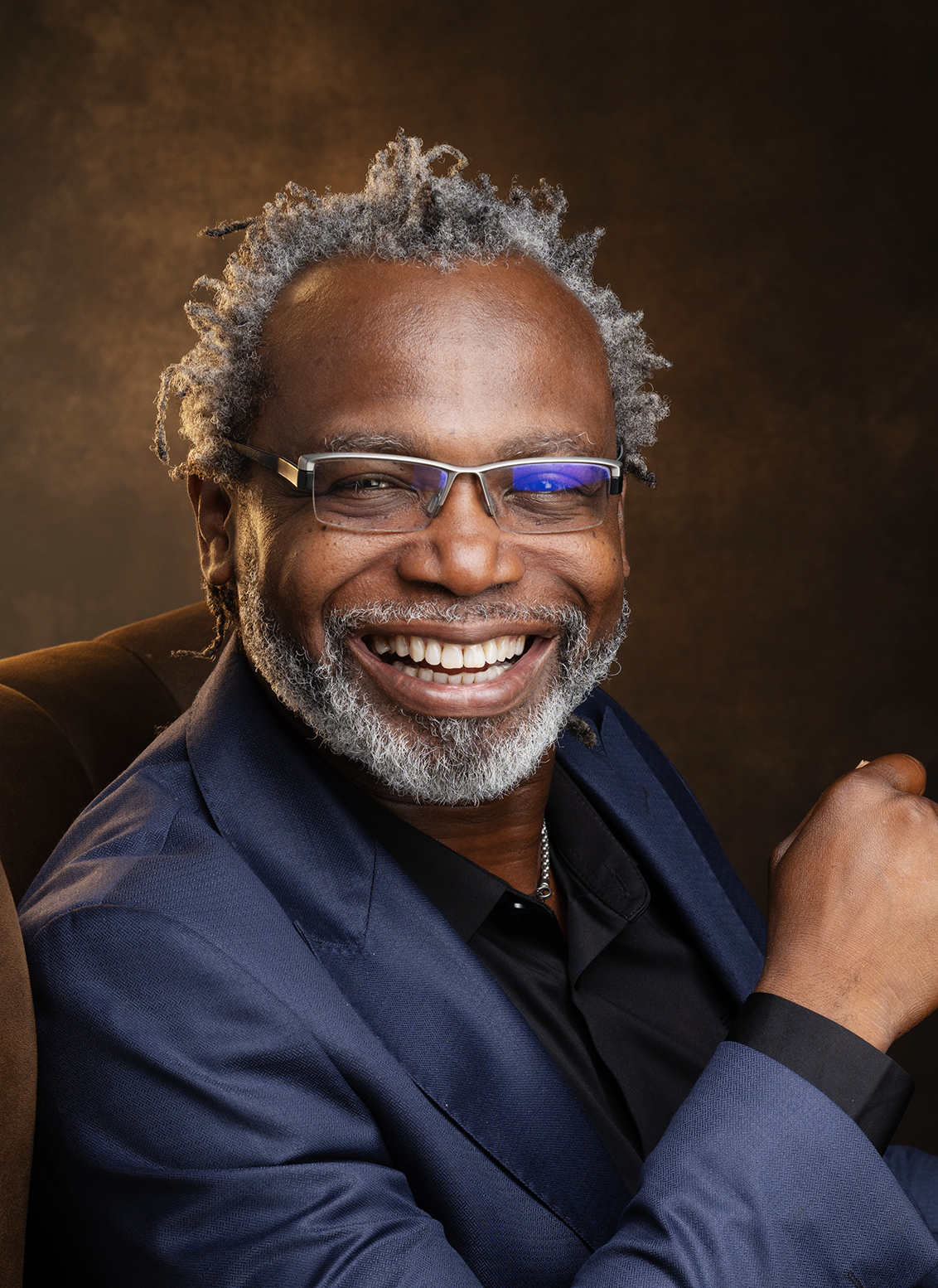
- Born: Kelechi Amadi-Obi; December 29, 1969; Owerri, Imo State, Nigeria
- Education: University of Nigeria, Nsukka
- Occupations: Artist, photographer
- Organization: Kelechi Amadi-Obi Studios
- Known for: Photography
- Partner: Julia Amadi-Obi
- Website: kelechiamadiobi.com

Kelechi Amadi-Obi // (born December 29, 1969) is a Nigerian creative photographer, painter, artist and the publisher of Mania Magazine. His work in photography and visual art has earned him international renown featuring in many international exhibitions including Snap Judgment: New Position in contemporary African Photography, International center of photography New York (2006). He has been described as one of Nigeria's groundbreaking celebrity photographers who has "helped put Nigerian photography on the world map". Vogue calls him "a major force in the creative scene in Nigeria".

== Early life and education ==
Born in Owerri, Imo State to the family of Justice Sylvester Amadi-Obi, a high court judge, and Mrs Theresa Amadi-Obi, an educationist, Amadi-Obi is the fifth of seven children. He attended Library Avenue Primary school, Umuahia, Abia State, and went to Government College Umuahia for his secondary education. His university education was at University Nigeria Nsukka, where he studied law.

He obtained his law degree in 1992 and was called to the Nigerian Bar in 1994. While in campus, he floated a small company which he named De-Zulu. Later, he grew more interested in the art of photography and eventually, after long years of practice, became a founding member of the Nigerian photography collective Depth of Field, which had as one of its members, TY Bello who would also go on to be a successful photographer and musician.

Amadi-Obi in an interview with Onebello, a fashion magazine, when asked why he dumped law for photography, said the choice wasn't between photography and law, but between photography and art. He said he had always been an artist right from childhood. His work have been exhibited at the Lagos Photo Festival, Didi Museum, Rele Art Gallery, and other places.

== Depth of Field ==
In 2001, Amadi-Obi helped co-found Depth of Field (DOF) a collective of Nigerian photographers, artist and painters. It was an initiative of popular Nigerian photographer Uche James Iroha, ace photographer TY Bello, Amaize Ojeikere, Emeka Okereke, Kelechi Amad-Obi and Zainab Balogun, which took off after the six artists met in Bamako, Mali, during an art exhibition named Memories Intimes D’un Nouveau Milleanaire Ives Recontres de la Photo (Bamako, 2001). The group was formed with the goal of attaining photography excellence by gathering regularly to encourage each other and critic each other's work.

The group went ahead to organize art and photography exhibitions of their works in Nigeria and abroad.

== Style Mania magazine ==
After many years of shooting fashion and beauty photographs for the likes of True Love magazine, a South African magazine with a huge readership in Nigeria which went ahead to have a West African edition called True Love West Africa, Amadi-Obi started his own glossy fashion magazine which he called Style Mania magazine. The magazine typically featured on its covers Nigerian artists and creative types like Tiwa Savage, P-Square, Omotola Jalade Ekeinde, Stephanie Okereke, TY Bello, Agbani Darego, Bassey Ikpi, Mo’ Cheddah among others, all taken by Amadi-Obi.

== Discovery of 'Bukola' ==
In late 2016, during a photoshoot for hip hop artist Jidenna on Broad Street, Lagos, Amadi-Obi discovered Bukola, who was selling pillows on the streets of Lagos. He immediately showed interest in her as a potential model and scheduled a shoot in his studio. The result were a series of stunning photographs that went viral around Nigeria, turning the former pillow seller into an overnight success in modelling.

== Notable photographs ==
- In June 2013 Amadi–Obi photographed Nigeria musical duo, P-Square in his studio. In the same month, he photographed Tiwa Savage for Mania Magazine cover.
- In October in 2014., he photographed Stephanie Okereke in a yellow gown for the cover of Mania Magazine
- In November 2014, he photographed Agbani Derego, a super model and former Miss World winner (first native African to win the Miss World Beauty Pageant in 2001)
- In 2015, he photographed the president of Nigeria Muhammadu Buhari for his presidential campaign.
- In April 2017, he photographed Africa's richest man, Aliko Dangote, for his 59th birthday celebration.
- In February 2018, he photographed Omotola Jalade Ekeinde on a private jet for her 40th birthday.

== Exhibitions ==
=== Solo exhibitions ===
- 1996 Morning Light. Surulere, Lagos.
- 1997 Man and Nature. The Russian Cultural Center, Lagos.
- 1998 New Works, American Guest Quarters, Lagos.
- 1999 New Works, Embassy of Lebanon, Lagos.

=== Group exhibitions ===
- 1997 UNESCO Exhibition World Environmental Day, Lagos.
- 1997 Vision 2010: Contemporary Nigeria Art, Nicon Noga Hilton, Abuja.
- 1998 Women. Hour Glass Gallery, Lagos.
- 2000 Behind the Wall. Galleria Romana, Lagos.
- 2000 Nigerian Art. Elf Club Port-Harcourt.
- 2001 Photography and the Mega City. The Goethe Institute, Lagos.
- 2001 The 4@th African Photography Encounter. Bamako, Mali.
- 2002 Made in Africa Photography. Spazio Oberden, Milan, Italy.
- 2003 Jigida. The Governor's House, London, UK.
- 2003 Lagos Inside. Photo Exhibition, Maison De France, Lagos.
- 2003 Transferts. Brussels, Belgium.
- 2004, "Lagos" Ifa Gallery, Stuttgart, Germany
- 2005 "Depth of Field" South London Gallery, UK
- 2006 "Snap Judgement" – New Position in Contemporary African Photography, International Centre of Photography, New York City

=== Commissions ===
- The Vatican Collection, Vatican City.
- The Ford Foundation, Lagos.
- Guinness Nigeria 2004 corporate calendar.
- British American Tobacco, Lagos.
- The Aso Villa Collection, Abuja.
- Powertron (Nig.) calendar 1997
- Central Insurance
- So&U Advertising
- Industrial and General Insurance

=== Collections ===
- Professor Jubril Aminu.
- Mr. Pascal Dozie.
- Mr. Peter Theodolou.
- Mr. H’agannakis.
