= Daddy K =

Dubai-based Nigerian painter

- Born: Akpojivi Joel Onoriode; 19 April 1989 (age 37); Delta State
- Citizenship: Nigeria
- Occupation: Painter

Akpojivi Joel Onoriode, also known as Daddy K, is a Dubai based Nigerian painter.

== Early life ==
Onoriode was born on 19 April 1989 in Delta State. He had his primary education at the Samrute Nursery and Primary School in Ovwian, Warri and his secondary education at Ovwian secondary school. He was awarded a BA in Fine and Applied Arts from Delta State University in 2013. Onoriode is the owner of Finishing Glance Limited and the managing director of Porsh and Glance General Trading, a Dubai-based company. He is also known for his philanthropic acts and was given a Humanitarian Service Award in 2019 by the MC Orange Foundation.

== Work ==
Onoriode's work is focused on "mixed media painting and pencil drawings with a combination of hue, texture, and symbolism." His first work was in 2008 and was directed to the lack of infrastructure and technology in some parts of Africa.

== Exhibitions ==
In collaboration with Art Smiley Gallery, Dubai, Onoriode has been featured in group exhibitions in Dubai which includes his exhibition at the 6th edition of World Art Subai. Some of the titles of his featured paintings that are exhibited are "Dubai Frame," "World Pandemic," "Brothers Keeper, " "Music Lives Forever," "Technology is the new learning," and "All Races Are Equal."

== Legal issues ==
Onoriode was accused of fraud in 2019, arrested by the Economic and Financial Crimes Commission (EFCC), and charged in court but was later released and the case was terminated.
