= Fati Abubakar =

Nigerian photographer

- Born: Maiduguri, Borno State, Nigeria
- Education: University of Maiduguri; London South Bank University; Duke University
- Occupations: Photographer; nurse; public health worker

Fati Abubakar is a Nigerian photojournalist and documentary photographer based in Maiduguri, Borno State. She is known for Bits of Borno, a long-running photographic series documenting daily life in northeastern Nigeria during the Boko Haram insurgency.

== Early life and education ==
Abubakar was born and raised in Maiduguri, the capital of Borno State. She earned a BSc in nursing from the University of Maiduguri, followed by a master's degree in public health and health promotion from London South Bank University in 2015. She later completed an MFA in Experimental and Documentary Arts at Duke University in the United States.

== Career ==
=== Bits of Borno ===
Abubakar began posting photographs to an Instagram account titled Bits of Borno in 2014, after returning to Maiduguri. She has said the project was motivated by a perceived imbalance in international coverage of the region, which she felt focused almost exclusively on violence and the abduction of the Chibok schoolgirls while overlooking everyday life. The series combines street portraits with short captions or interview excerpts, often depicting market traders, displaced people, students, and members of local civilian self-defense groups.

The series received wider international attention in 2016, when The New York Times profiled Abubakar and her work; local journalists quoted in the profile said they were not aware of another woman photographer working in Borno State at the time. Her photographs and accompanying stories have since been published by The New York Times, the BBC, CNN, Newsweek, Voice of America, Al Jazeera, and AFP.

Alongside Bits of Borno, Abubakar has produced a series titled Education in a Crisis, documenting students returning to schools that had been closed for security reasons between 2014 and 2016, and The Other Abducted Girls, addressing women and girls abducted by Boko Haram in villages across Borno State.

=== Exhibitions and other work ===
Abubakar's photographs have been exhibited at venues including the Harn Museum of Art in Florida, the Ake Arts and Book Festival, Art X Lagos, Soze Gallery, Photobastei in Zurich, and the LagosPhoto Festival. She has been a contributing author for Africa Is a Country and Al Jazeera.

She has also worked as a nurse and public health worker, and has spoken in interviews about the relationship between her medical training and her documentary practice, particularly in covering malnutrition among displaced children in Borno State. She was previously a visiting lecturer at Duke Kunshan University in China.

=== Fati Abubakar Foundation ===
Abubakar established the Fati Abubakar Foundation, which operates a photography and media training program for young people in Borno State. The foundation's first photography workshop, held in 2022, received several hundred applications for ten places; the program was eventually expanded to thirty participants, of whom roughly half were women. The foundation has leased a building in Maiduguri intended to serve as an arts centre with library, editing, and exhibition space, and lends cameras to participants who cannot afford their own equipment.
