= Olajumoke Orisaguna =

Nigerian model (born 1989)

- Born: 1989 (age 36–37); Ire, Osun state, Nigeria
- Other names: Olajumoke Chris; Omo Oni Bread; Nigerian Cinderella
- Occupations: Model; Radio presenter Bread hawker (former)
- Partner: Sunday Orisaguna
- Children: 2

Olajumoke Orisaguna (born 1989) is a Nigerian model and radio personality who first gained public attention after she accidentally photobombed a photo shoot with British rapper Tinie Tempah while hawking bread on the streets of Lagos. The resulting photo catapulted her into the spotlight, leading to lucrative modelling and reality television opportunities. Her journey garnered widespread media attention, including features by CNN and BBC Africa, and she has been celebrated as a role model. In 2024, after a five-year hiatus, Orisaguna reappeared in the media to reveal domestic violence and exploitation had derailed her once-thriving career.

== Early life ==
Orisaguna was born in 1989, raised in Ire, Osun State, and trained as a hairdresser upon completing her primary education. Her relationship with Sunday Orisaguna, an artisan by trade, produced two daughters, but his family's hostility – in addition to Sunday's physical abuse – fueled tension in their home. Following an altercation with Sunday's sister, Olajumoke left the relationship and relocated to Lagos where she made a living hawking freshly-baked bread.

== Discovery ==
In 2016, whilst selling bread on Olonode Street in Yaba, Lagos, Orisaguna's image was captured in the background during a photo shoot with Tinie Tempah taken by celebrity photographer TY Bello. Upon reviewing the images, Bello noticed Orisaguna's striking features and agreed she possessed modelling potential. After posting the photograph on Instagram to rave reviews from the public, she scouted Orisaguna and offered to help launch her career. Bello subsequently arranged for Orisaguna's portrait to appear on Style magazine's cover, with plans for a documentary about her remarkable journey.

== Modelling ==
Orisaguna initially signed with Few Models, and later with Beth Model Management. During her tenure as a model, Orisaguna landed brand deals with various companies including clothes store PayPorté, bakeries Shirley's Bread and Zenith Bakery, designer Layo G, and womenswear brand Salmah Guzel. She also appeared on the cover of Above, and walked the runway at Soweto Fashion Week where she signed a new deal with Ruutos Hair.

== Education ==
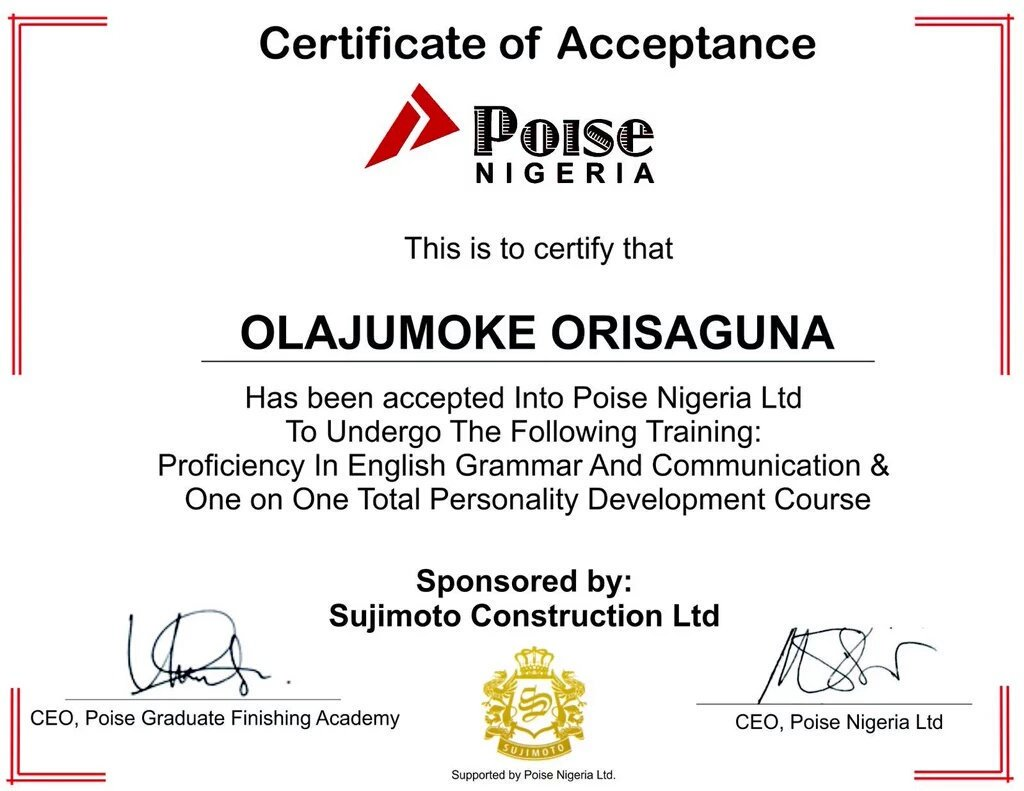
Orisaguna's Poise Nigeria acceptance certificate

Due to her limited formal education and minimal English proficiency (She is fluent in Yoruba), Orisaguna was offered a scholarship by Sujimoto Group to attend Poise Nigeria, a Lekki-based finishing school, to study Etiquette, Soft Skills, Social Graces, English, and Communication. This was to ensure that Olajumoke was well-prepared after the media attention subsided. Sujimoto also provided Orisaguna five-year accommodation in a fully-furnished Surulere apartment, and her children were offered tuition to university level, helping to secure their future.

== Controversy ==
In a February 2018 YouTube video titled Olajumoke Sauce 7: Trends and Acceptance, Orisaguna expressed shock over the existence of gay people and their right to marry. She described homosexuality as "un-Nigerian," stating, "I know that there is no Nigerian that was born gay or lesbian." Orisaguna also revealed that she struggled to sleep after learning through Facebook that some gay individuals intended to marry. Her remarks included a troubling statement that LGBT individuals "will be dealt with in ways you can’t imagine," which many interpreted as a veiled threat. These comments were particularly controversial given the significant presence of LGBT individuals in the fashion industry. In response to Orisaguna's remarks, Nigerian transgender model Veso Golden Oke posted a video criticising her statements and urged her to educate herself about the LGBT community, calling for greater understanding and highlighted the importance of awareness regarding diverse sexual orientations and gender identities.

In 2019, Orisaguna's partner, Sunday, who had relocated to Lagos to reside with her, accused her of disrespecting him since rising to fame. Sunday also alleged that, despite expressing his intentions to marry her to her mother, Orisaguna had declined to formalise their relationship, stating that the time was not yet right. Orisaguna - who subsequently changed her name to Olajumoke Chris - addressed the allegations in an interview with The Punch, asserting that their relationship remained intact. She added that only God could judge between her and her husband regarding the claims he had been making in his interviews about her.

== Comeback ==
In 2024, after a five-year hiatus, Orisaguna spoke to radio host Ibukun 'Bybisasa' Adesoye on City FM and revealed that she was never legally married to her now ex-partner despite bearing his surname, and his jealousy had contributed to further domestic violence which she endured in silence and kept hidden from her mentor Bello. Her limited formal education had prevented her from reading contracts that her new manager had offered, resulting in significant losses.

Orisaguna has expressed her willingness to acquire an education (She was unable to complete her English and etiquette classes due to commuter challenges), and is currently reinventing herself as a radio presenter with the City FM talk show Kilon Shele with Olajumoke.
