= Wole Lagunju =

Nigerian artist (born 1966)

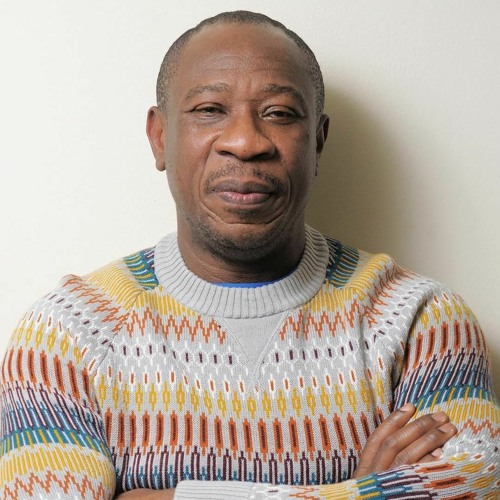
Wole Lagunju, 2023

Wole Lagunju (born in 1966) is a Nigerian visual artist who is acclaimed for his innovative approach that blends traditional Yoruba art with contemporary Western influences.

== Early life and education ==
Born in Oshogbo in 1966, he later graduated in Fine Arts and Graphic Design from the University of Ife (also known as "Obafemi Awolowo University") in 1986. Lagunju's artistic style revolves around intricate paintings that intertwine traditional Gelede masks with representations of modern Western women, redefining Yoruba art and design.

== Work and galleries ==
His works reflect a fusion of cultural icons from diverse historical periods such as the Dutch Golden Age, Elizabethan era, and the mid-20th century Euro-American milieu. Lagunju's pieces explore African colonization and decolonization eras, critiquing 19th-century racial and social structures while commenting on power, femininity, and womanhood.

Lagunju has exhibited in Nigeria and internationally, including exhibitions ar "Yoruba Remixed" at Ebonycurated Gallery in Capetown (2018) and "Womanscape: Race, Gender, and Sexuality in African Art" at the University of Texas, Austin (2011). Recognized for his contributions, he received the Phillip Ravenhill Fellowship from UCLA in 2006 and the Pollock Krasner award in 2009.
