= TY Bello =

Nigerian photographer and singer

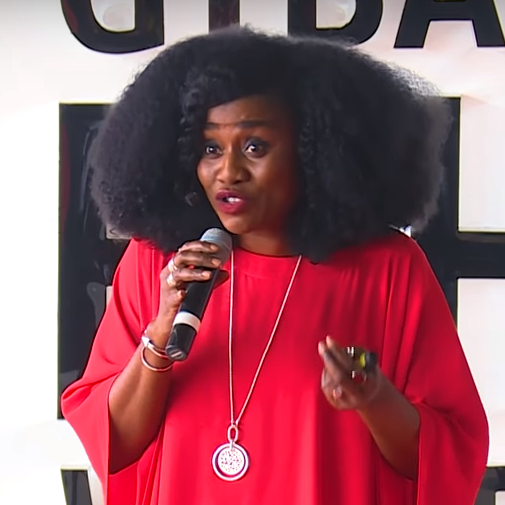
- TY Bello in 2017

Background information
- Born: Toyin Shokefun; 14 January 1978 (age 48); Ogun State, Nigeria
- Genres: Gospel
- Occupations: Singer-songwriter; photographer; philanthropist
- Years active: 2003–present
- Website: tybello.com

Toyin Sokefun-Bello (born 14 January 1978), who is better known as TY Bello, is a Nigerian singer, songwriter, photographer and philanthropist. Prior to pursuing a solo career, she was a member of the now defunct gospel band Kush. Bello is currently a member of the Nigerian photography collective, Depth of Field. She has released the albums Greenland (2008), The Future (2011), The Morning Songbook (2014), Africa Awake (2021), We Are Fire (2022), Heaven Has Come (2023), and The Spirit of Light (2024).

== Life and career ==
=== Early life and career beginnings ===
Bello was born on 14 January 1978, in Ogun State, Nigeria. She attained a degree in economics from the University of Lagos, and briefly practiced journalism before venturing into photography. Bello emerged onto Nigeria's musical landscape as a member of the defunct group Kush, an acronym for Kinetically Ushering Salvation into Hearts and Homes. Other members of the group included Lara George, Dapo Torimiro and rapper Emem Ema. Kush gained popularity in the early 2000s with the single "Let's Live Together", and released an album before disbanding.

=== 2008–2013:Greenland, The Future, The Jubilee Collection and anti-rape campaign ===
Art is about collecting experiences and expressing them. For me music and photography are similar art forms. I collect experiences, stir them in myself and express it in my own language. Just like my photography, music is my language.

— Bello, speaking about her photography and music

In 2008, Bello released her debut studio album Greenland, which was produced by Mosa Adegboye and took two years to develop. Described by the singer as a journey of her everyday life, Greenland earned Bello an award at both the Nigeria Music Awards and Sound City Awards. The album's lyrical content explores themes of love, family and nation. Its title track is an inspirational song written to motivate Nigerians to liberate themselves from a place of despair to a place of hope.

Bello first revealed plans about her second studio album, The Future, while speaking to Ariya Today. The Future was originally slated for release in 2011 and was ranked 12th on Nigerian Entertainment Today' s list of the 12 Albums to Buy in 2011. Bello worked with producer Mosa and recorded the album in a few months. On 19 February 2011, she released "The Future" as the lead single from the album of the same name. The song urges Nigerian youth to be the change they seek. Directed by Kemi Adetiba, the music video for "The Future" was released on 3 April 2011, and includes cameos from Sound Sultan, Chude Jideonwo, Banky W, and Tara Fela-Durotoye. Ore Fakorede awarded the song 7 stars out of 10, saying its "soft tribal drums, synths and a piano provide a vivid backdrop for TY to contrast her unmistakable voice against, and this she does brilliantly, bringing the poignancy in the song’s lyrics to life." Reviewing for Sahara Reporters, Dapo Osewa described the video as "a narrative in itself that dares to capture the varying and boundless composition of emotion that is the face of the Nigerian." Makeup brand House of Tara launched the Jubilee Collection, a limited edition makeup line inspired by the song.

In October 2011, Bello was one of the celebrities featured in an eight-minute anti-rape video compiled by the Nigerian Ministry of Youth Development. The anti-rape video sheds light on the victim of a gang rape at Abia State University in 2011. In December 2013, Bello released the Wale Adenuga-assisted single "Yahweh", which features additional vocals from Nwando Okeke and Mosa. Bello wrote the song's first line in 2004 during a photo-shoot.

=== 2014:The Morning Songbook ===
Bello's third studio album, The Morning Songbook, was released for free digital download on SoundCloud on 10 October 2014. It was released without any promotion and comprises ten tracks, including "Yahweh", "Thirsty" and "Jesu Jesu". The album features collaborations with M Sugh and Fela Durotoye. Udochukwu Ikwuagwu of the Breaking Times awarded the album 7 stars out of 10, commending its production and Bello's songwriting.

== Photography career ==
Bello was the official photographer to former President Goodluck Jonathan during his tenure in office; she also does work for Thisday fashion magazine.

=== 2016: Tinie Tempah and a discovery ===
Bello was working in Lagos where she was creating a photo shoot for the British rapper Tinie Tempah. She later discovered that there was a remarkable looking woman in the background. In an attempt to find Olajumoke Orisaguna, she arranged for Orisaguna's picture to appear on the cover of Style magazine.

== Humanitarian work ==
Bello organizes an annual photography exhibition to raise funds for orphans in Nigeria. She is also the director of Link-a-child, an NGO dedicated to proliferating information on orphanages in Nigeria and seeking sponsorship on their behalf. In July 2011, Bello was honoured by the non-profit Communication For Change organisation in a five-part documentary film series, titled RedHot.

== Personal life ==
Bello is married and gave birth to twin boys named Christian and Christopher on 10 October 2014, which coincidentally marked the release of The Morning Songbook.

== Discography ==
- Greenland (2008)
- The Future (2011)
- The Morning Songbook (2014)
- Africa Awake (2021)
- We Are Fire (2022)
- Heaven Has Come (2023)
- The Spirit of Light (2024)

== Awards and nominations ==
Soundcity Music Video Awards

Year	Nominee / work	Award	Result	Ref
2009	"Ekundayo"	Best Female Video	Won	

Nigeria Entertainment Awards

Year	Nominee / work	Award	Result	Ref
2008	Herself	Best New Act of the Year	Won	

The Headies

Year	Nominee / work	Award	Result	Ref
2008	Herself	Recording Artiste of the Year	Nominated	
2008	Herself	Hip Hop World Revelation of the Year	Nominated	
2008	TY Bello for "Ekundayo"	Best Vocal Performance (Female)	Nominated	
2008	TY Bello & Abbey for "Greenland"	Best Music Video (Director)	Nominated	

Creative Industry Awards

Year	Nominee / work	Award	Result	Ref
2013	Herself	Visual Arts	Nominated	

== See also ==
- List of Nigerian gospel musicians
- List of Nigerian Women Photographers
