= Wilfred Ukpong =

French-Nigerian artist

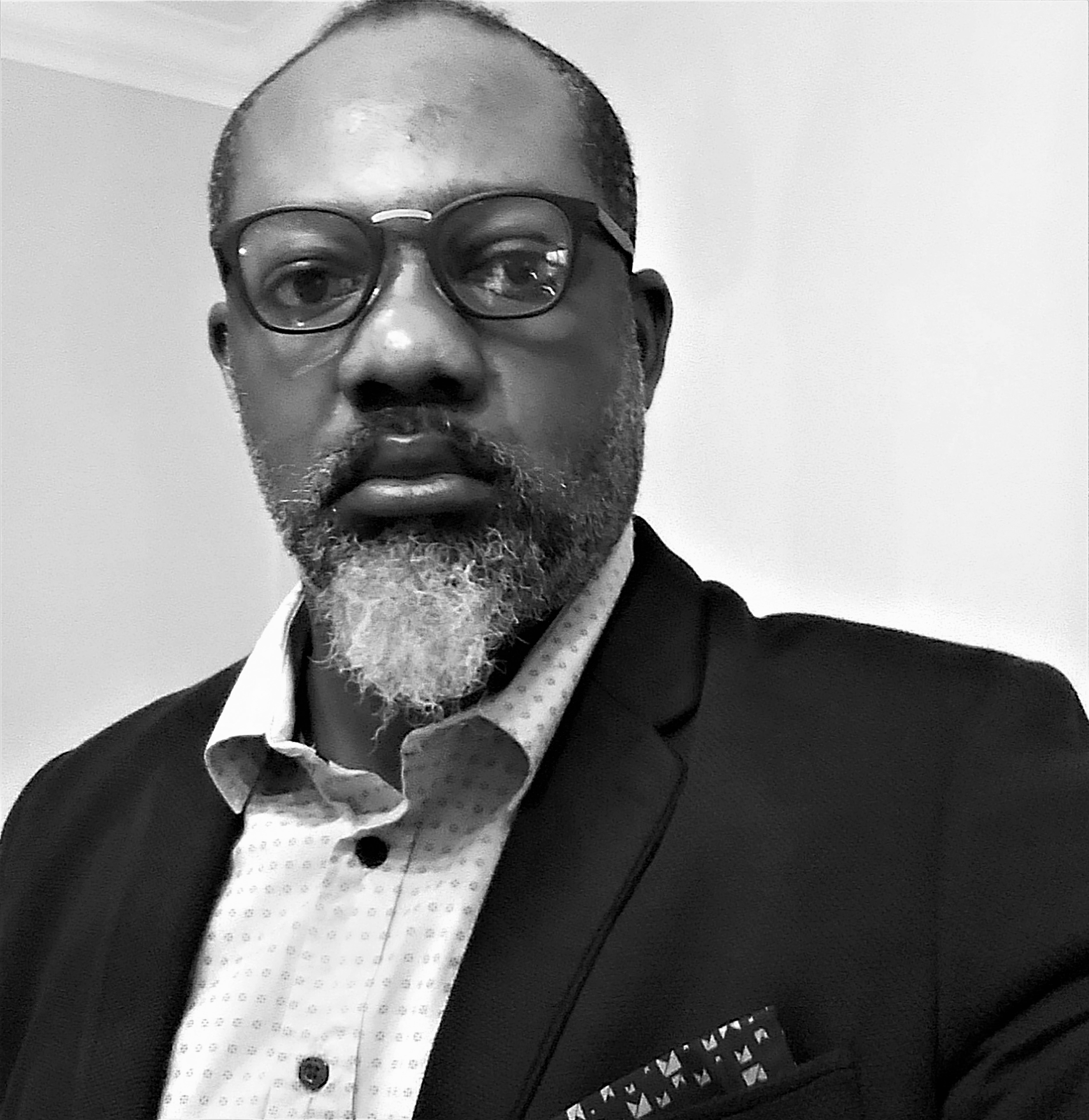
- Education: Ecole Supérieure d'Art Lorient, France, Fine Arts BA/MFA; Oxford Brookes University (UK), PhD
- Known for: Sculpture, photography, video
- Notable work: Niger-Delta/Future-Cosmos, Blazing Century 1, Future-World-EXV,
- Awards: Golden City Gates Excellence Film Award, ITB Berlin (2018)

Wilfred Ukpong is a French-Nigerian interdisciplinary artist and researcher whose distinctive socially engaged practice utilizes several interwoven mediums, including photography, film, sculpture, performance, architecture, and creative workshops, to tackle pertinent social issues with community participation and intervention. His work frequently engages with the social consequences of environmental issues in the Niger Delta as a result of its petroleum industry.

== Early life and education ==
Wilfred Ukpong was born in southern Nigeria. He has a BA and an MFA in Fine/Studio Arts from the École européenne supérieure d'art de bretagne de lorient, France; and a PhD in Fine/Studio Arts from Oxford Brookes University, UK.

== Life and work ==
Ukpong lives and works between Oxford (UK), Clermont-Ferrand (France), and Eket (Nigeria). His work uses aspects of Afrofuturism and mysticism in his work to confront the social consequences of environmental issues in the Niger Delta as a result of its petroleum industry. He is the founder and director of Blazing Century Studios which is based between Nigeria, France and the United States.

Ukpong's largest project to date is Blazing Century-1. He says: "Spanning between 2011 and 2017, Blazing Century-1 is the first installment in a 10-part multi-faceted body of work. Each part is set within a geographical location often embroiled in social and environmental devastation and is developed on several platforms," including sculpture, photography, sound, performance, film, music, workshops, and talks."

Since 2020, Ukpong's art films and photographic installations have been exhibited at Alliance Française/Mike Adenuga Centre (Nigeria), FotoFest, Houston (USA), Institut Français du Nigeria Abuja (Nigeria), MARKK Museum Hamburg (Germany), Pipe Factory Glasgow (UK), Royal Society of Arts, London (UK), Welt Museum Vienna (Austria) amongst others.

== Exhibitions ==
=== Solo exhibitions ===
- BC-1: Niger-Delta/Future-Cosmos, Alliance Francaise de Lagos/Mike Adenuga Centre Lagos, 2021
- Future – World – EXV: PRELUDE 2, film Screening, and Conversation at the ESSAY FILM FESTIVAL LONDON, 2021
- Future – World – EXV, Royal Society of Art London, Film Screening and Conversation
- Composing A Cause: A Meditative Sonic Visual Experience curated Film Screening, Performance and Conversation by Wilfred Ukpong, Professor Ray Lee and Hugo Tromp at Autograph-ABP London, 2021
- Future – World – EXV, at Public Ecology Film Festival, Film Screening and Symposium at the Association for Visual Arts in Cape Town, 2022
- Blazing Century 1, French Institute in Nigeria, Abuja, Nigeria, 2022
- Wilfred Ukpong: Niger-Delta / Future-Cosmos, Autograph ABP, London, 16 February – 1 June 2024. Curated by Mark Sealy

=== Group exhibitions ===
- Diana Ejaita and Wilfred Ukpong Exhibition at Omenka Gallery Lagos, 2019
- African Cosmologies — Photography, Time and the Other, FotoFest Biennial 2020, Houston, USA. Curated by Mark Sealy. Postponed due to the COVID-19 pandemic.
- The Colour of the Climate Crisis, Pipe Factory, Glasgow, Scotland, 31 October – 2 November 2021. Organised by Do The Green Thing.
- Wasser Botschaften/Water Massages, Museum am Rothenbaum–World Cultures and Arts (MARKK), 2023
- Science Fiction(s) - If there was a tomorrow, Welt Museum Wien (World Museum Vienna), 2023
- Africa Rising: 21st-Century African Photography, Fitchburg Art Museum, Massachusetts, 2024

== Publications with contributions by Ukpong ==
- African Cosmologies: Photography, Time and the Other. Schilt, 2020. Co-edited Mark Sealy and Steven Evans. Exhibition catalogue. ISBN 978-9053309322.

== Filmography ==
- Future – World – EXV (2019) – directed by Ukpong

== Awards ==
- 2010: Ukpong's long-term project Blazing Century 1 received a special grant from the Prince Claus Fund Amsterdam
- 2018: His film Future World (2017) won the Golden City Gates Excellence Award at ITB Berlin and was presented at the Nigerian Senate to encourage environmental change in the Niger Delta.
- 2024: Shortlisted for the inaugural Saltzman Prize from Lisa Saltzman
