= Emmanuel Eni =

Nigerian artist (b. 1967)

Emmanuel Eni, 2015

Emmanuel Eni (born 1967) is a Nigerian-born artist and poet. He works in various mediums including painting, sculpture, and performance art.

== Biography ==
Eni is from Igbanke, in mid-west Nigeria. He received a degree from Igbobi College in Lagos, Nigeria. In 1984 he graduated from the polytechnic Auchi in the same city. The University of Benin awarded him a BA in sculpture in 1991. Afterwards, he attended the Royal Academy of Arts in London, where he received a degree in 1993.

He is the inventor and patent holder of "New Light Paintings", and the philosopher of the thesis of "Contemporary Baroque." He is the writer and performer of "Black man in European Kitchen" and is also known as the "sculptor of elephants," and the "Father of 100 Elephants." His drama Death of the Curator was performed at the Museum of Ethnography in Leipzig.

He has repeatedly addressed the Israel-Palestine conflict in his works, as in the Dakar Biennale in 2006.

== Exhibitions ==
Eni has had exhibitions at the Biennale d'art contemporain de Lyon, France, the Biennale in Dakar (Dak'Art) Senegal, and parallel at the Documenta 12 in Kassel.

- "Hope of Love" paintings and sculptures, Germany
- "THE BOOM" exhibition of new light painting art and sculptures
- "Brightness of the picture" - sculptures and paintings, Schwarzenbach an der Saale, Bavaria, Germany
- "Haske Zanen" - sculptures, paintings and performance with new light, painting, art
- Thought pyramid Gallery Abuja / German Embassy Abuja Nigeria
- "Art Merchant“ - sculptures and paintings, National museum Lagos, Nigeria
- Diverse lecture activities in sculpture, installation, audiovisual performance and literature
- "Leaf spirit totem" - 7 m high sculpture for Syke, Bremen Germany (Wood, Terra Kota, Mirror glass, 2011)
- "Blackman in European Kitchen", ICD Institute for cultural diplomacy, Berlin, Germany
- "Ear as a long road" - poetic performance, Berlin, Poetry Festival Lyricline
- "Consciences and frontiers" installation "Israel and Palestine" and "Knowledge is power" - SAVVY Contemporary, Berlin, Germany
- Exhibition / performance Israel and Palestine "Schlachtfelder" - Battlefields Anniversary of 250 years battle - city of Minden, Germany
- "Black History month" - Africa reflection - sculptures and paintings, America Haus, Berlin, Germany
- "2nd African Legends Performance" poetic musical dance performance, America Haus, Berlin, Germany
- ARESUVA - African regional summit for visual arts, Abuja, Nigeria
- Visiting professor new media/performance - Art University Berlin Weißensee. Kunsthochschule Berlin - Weißensee Berlin, Germany
- "Africanize" installation - Grassimuseum Grassi Museum, Saxony Ethnographic collection, Leipzig, Germany
- "Africanize" installation kunstbanken hamar Hamar, Norway
- "Blackman in European Kitchen" - installation/performance, Goethe-Institute, Lagos, Nigeria
- "CharacterLAGOStika", Goethe-Institut Nigeria, Lagos, Nigeria
- "Death of the curator" installation/performance, documenta 12, Kassel, Germany
- "CrossCulture" installation/performance - Goethe-Institut Senegal, Dakar, Senegal
- Publication "Death of the curator" drama. E.N.I Publishers, Berlin
- Group Show "Black Paris" African position on contemporary art of Diaspora, Iwalewahaus, Bayreuth, Germany
- "Blackman in European Kitchen" - performance Iwalewahaus, Bayreuth, Germany
- "Israel and Palestine" installation/performance Dak'Art 2006 Biennial of Contemporary African Art, Dakar, Senegal
- "Junking of the Elephant" – destruction of a 20-ton heavy "Elephant" Monument of re-enforced Steel Concrete - Before a live Audience. For the Ecology and nature
- "Death of the curator" installation/performance, Grassi museum Leipzig, Saxony Ethnographic collection, Germany
- Guest professor sculpture - rhode island school of design (risd), USA
- Publication "Masquaradeundressing" (poems, tales and stories), CPN publishers, England
- "Water Burns" - exhibition/installation on "Water Uses" in the New Millennium Vienna, Austria
- "History of love" - sculptures and paintings. Galerie im Prater, Berlin, Germany
- Making of "Elephant" (20 ton monument for nature) und Making of "Leaf“ (7 meters high monument for nature) steel concrete
- "Characteristics of living things", Archäologisches Museum Colombischlössle Archeology museum of Castle Colombi, Freiburg im Breisgau, Germany
- "Parts of Clay" - Centre Monroe for the Arts, Hoboken, New Jersey, USA
- "Clear Walls" - Lisa Parker Fine Art New York, USA
- "Parables" - National Museum, Lagos, Nigeria
- "Creation Story" - Albertus - Magnus - Haus, Freiburg im Breisgau, Germany
- Drawing School, University of Lagos, Nigeria.

== Bibliography ==
- Emmanuel Eni: Death of the curator. Berlin 2007.
- Emmanuel Eni: Elephants and new – light paintings (Ausstellung vom 19. August bis 9. Oktober 2011, Galerie Schwartzsche Villa, Hrsg.: Bezirksamt Steglitz-Zehlendorf, Kulturamt. Projektmitarbeiter: Anja Braun, Stefan Martinkat)
- Emmanuel Eni: The Art of Blackman in European Kitchen. 2017.
- "Kindonkind"- Poetry anthology. 321 pages of 600 poems published in Germany 2021

== Recent projects ==
In 2026, Eni introduced two digital evaluation frameworks designed to provide objective pricing for professional artworks:

- Basic Metric Scale for Art Products (BMSFAP): A structured tool that evaluates art based on six artistic elements (such as concept, technical skill, and aesthetic impact) to generate a transparent suggested valuation of up to $12,000.
- General Metric Scale for Art Products (GMSFAP): A framework measuring art across nine artistic criteria to generate a suggested valuation ranging from $50,000 to $200,000,000.
