= Samson Bakare =

Nigerian artist

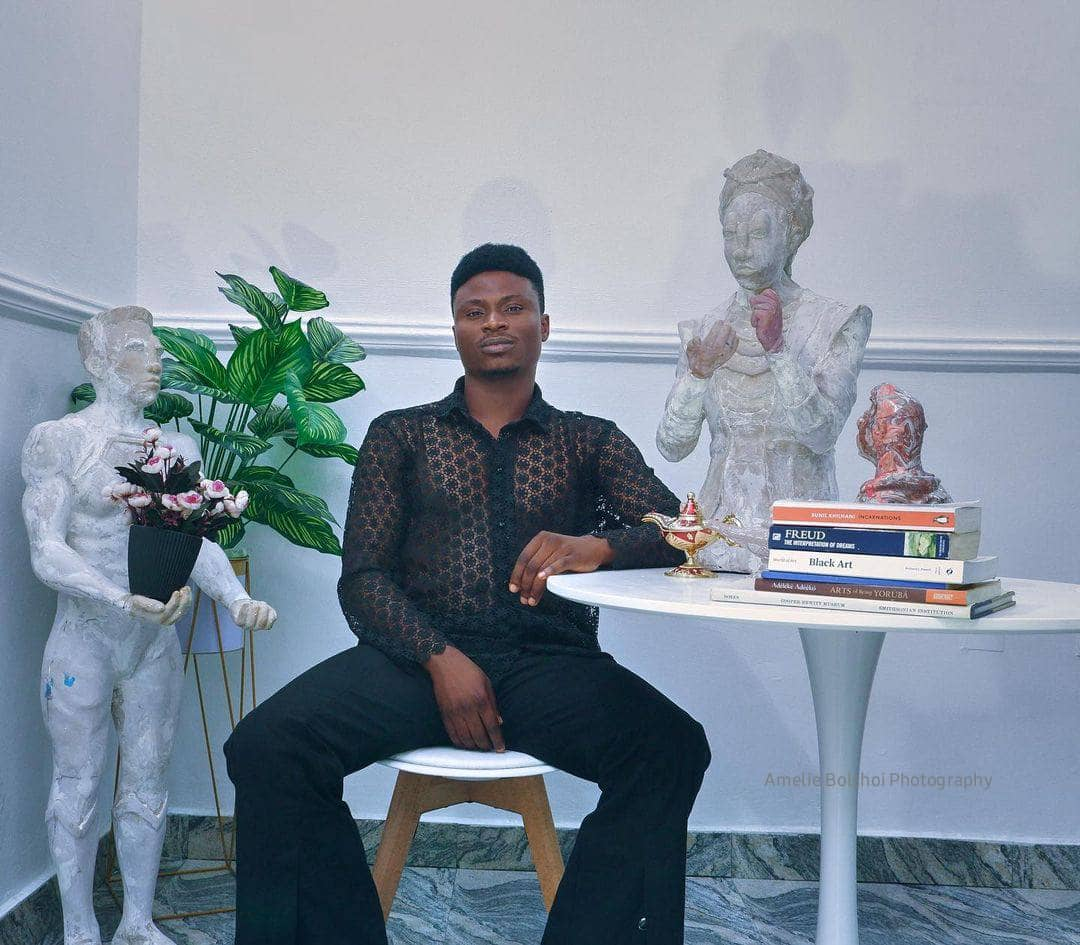
- Samson Bakare
- Born: Lagos
- Education: Yaba College of Technology
- Occupation: Multi-disciplinary artist. sculptor. painter. designer
- Known for: Portrayal of dark toned bodies with dynamic flowery background
- Notable work: Let this be a sign, Life's a short trip
- Website: samsonbakare.com

Samson Bakare is a Nigerian-born, multidisciplinary artist based in the United Kingdom, who is known for his portrayal of dark toned bodies with dynamic flowery background. He arrays his semi-figurative subjects in brilliant colours, making an audible aesthetic statement. His work is characterized by protruding eyes, distinctively detailed Iris and Pupil. Bakare became known after his collaboration with Gucci.

Bakare has also engaged people at The Cultural Summit Abu Dhabi, discussing critical matters of decolonization, restitution, and identity on a panel with Fiammetta Rocco, Ashley Shaw-Scott Adjaye and professor Monica Hanna.

His sculptures have also been featured on the front page of Dada Magazine.

== Early life and education ==
Bakare started drawing comics and replicating movies at a tender age. He was inspired by his father, who is an architect and graduate of the University of Lagos. In 2012, he attended an apprenticeship training in Universal Studios of Art located at the National Theatre, Nigeria. He graduated from the school of art and design at Yaba College of Technology, where he majored in painting, sharing an alma mater with Oresegun Olumide.

Samson is a member of the Arts in Medicine Fellowship., and Society of Nigerian Artists, Lagos chapter.

== Style of art/work ==
Samson's subjects are portrayal of dark toned bodies with dynamic flowery background. His work is characterized by protruding eyes, distinctively detailed Iris and Pupil. The East African coptic art was a great influence at the early stages of his exploration, a style he calls Afro-classicism.

As a multi-disciplinary artist, Bakare creates life-size sculptures in fiberglass to give compelling dimensional expressions to his Afrocentric point of view. Bakare has depicted a number of satirical pieces with an attempt to review the excesses of British-imperialism. Largely revisiting the conversations on restitution and Post-Africanism as he infuses African bronze antics, wooden artefacts which conveys rich cultural symbols in his paintings. His work speaks audibly about fashion as it appears in contemporary lifestyle.

== Gallery ==
He uses Acrylic on canvas, fiberglass, spray paints, wood and paper.

== Exhibitions ==
- 2019: counter history, Alliance Française de Lagos.
- 2020: Occupied space, open house studio Accra
- 2021: Paradigms of perception, Mitochondria gallery, Houston, Texas.
- 2021: Miami art fair, (Red dot Miami/ spectrum art fairs), mana wynwood, Miami Beach.
- 2022: Solo exhibition : In our days, Dida gallery, Abidjan, côte d’Ivoire (8 April- 21 April)
- 2022: Black magic, eclectica contemporary, Cape Town, South Africa
- 2022: Bad Posture, eclectica contemporary, Cape Town, South Africa
- 2022: Fluidity, Dada gallery, Cromwell place, London, United kingdom 9. 2022: Voyage, Nothing at all, Hong kong.
- 2022: Shout plenty, African artist foundation(AAF) alliance francaise, Mike Adenuga centre, Lagos (13 August – 1 October)
- 2022 :Solo exhibition: Life's a short trip solo exhibition, plzzzzz gallery, Taipei, Taiwan (2 September – 22 September)
- 2022: FNB Jobourg, South africa (2 September- 4 September)
- 2022: Contemporary African Art: Identity Dreams and Realities&quot;, Vytautas Kasiulis Art Museum, Vilnius, Lithuania
- 2022: Art X lagos, Federal palace hotel, Lagos, Nigeria (4 November – 6 November)
- 2023: Interaction, galerie zberro, Paris
- 2023: Solo exhibition: Let this be a sign, Dorothy Circus gallery, London, England (9 March- 11 April)
- ‘’2026: Echoes of identity, Barbican Centre, London, United Kingdom

== Collaboration ==
Samson Bakare was among the nine international artist selected to re-envision and re-interpret the Gucci Ingrid 1947 bamboo bag with the former global creative director for Gucci, Alessandro Michele the Florentine artisan.
