= Revolving Art Incubator =

Alternative art space in Lagos Nigeria

- Formation: 2016
- Founder: Jumoke Sanwo
- Website: https://www.revolvingartincubator.com

Revolving Art Incubator (RAI) is a contemporary / alternative art space in Lagos, Nigeria. It is situated in Silverbird Galleria on Victoria Island, Lagos.

== History ==
Revolving Art Incubator (RAI) was founded in 2016 by contemporary Nigerian Artist Jumoke Sanwo, as an alternative art space for multi-creative engagement and contemporary art discourse.

== Artists ==
RAI has featured a number of Nigerian-based international artists including Aderemi Adegbite, Babatunde Ogunlade, Akinwande, Chris Ogunlowo, and other emerging contemporary artists.

== Exhibitions and shows ==
RAI has staged exhibitions with artists working across diverse media. These include:

- Visual Representations: Past and Present
- Artist-At-Work
- Artist Talk
- Salvage Art Therapy Exhibition.
- Power Show II: The God-fathers Are Not to Blame by Ayo Akinwande
- Art + Virtual Reality
- RAI book-drive
- Animate Old Lagos project
- Black Wall Experiment

Revolving Art Incubator also holds OUTSPOKEN, a fortnightly oral diary of contemporary times through poetry, spoken word, and music.

== Purpose ==
Revolving Art Incubator was founded in 2016 as an interstitial place for creatives in Lagos to rethink creation of the Now for the Future. Its multidisciplinary and collaborative approach allows innovative and experimental creatives to participate in and harness cross-disciplinary synergies, transforming them into artistic and cultural treasures.

Since its inception, RAI have introduced creatives in the city of Lagos, to the transformative qualities of cross-disciplinary engagement, immersive technologies; and the possibilities to develop digital assets such as NFTs, through its collaborative projects with tech incubators and hubs locally and internationally

It has showcased over 50 artists, in solo and group exhibitions, and impacted thousands of creatives in the city of Lagos, through our exhibitions, events, workshops and conversations; engaging memory, contemporary happenings, and future technologies.

== Rating ==
RAI was listed in a February 2019 The New-York Times article, as one of the sharpest artist-led spaces in the city of Lagos.https://www.nytimes.com/2019/02/08/arts/design/lagos-nigeria-art-x-art.html
