= Sunday Jack Akpan =

Nigerian sculptor

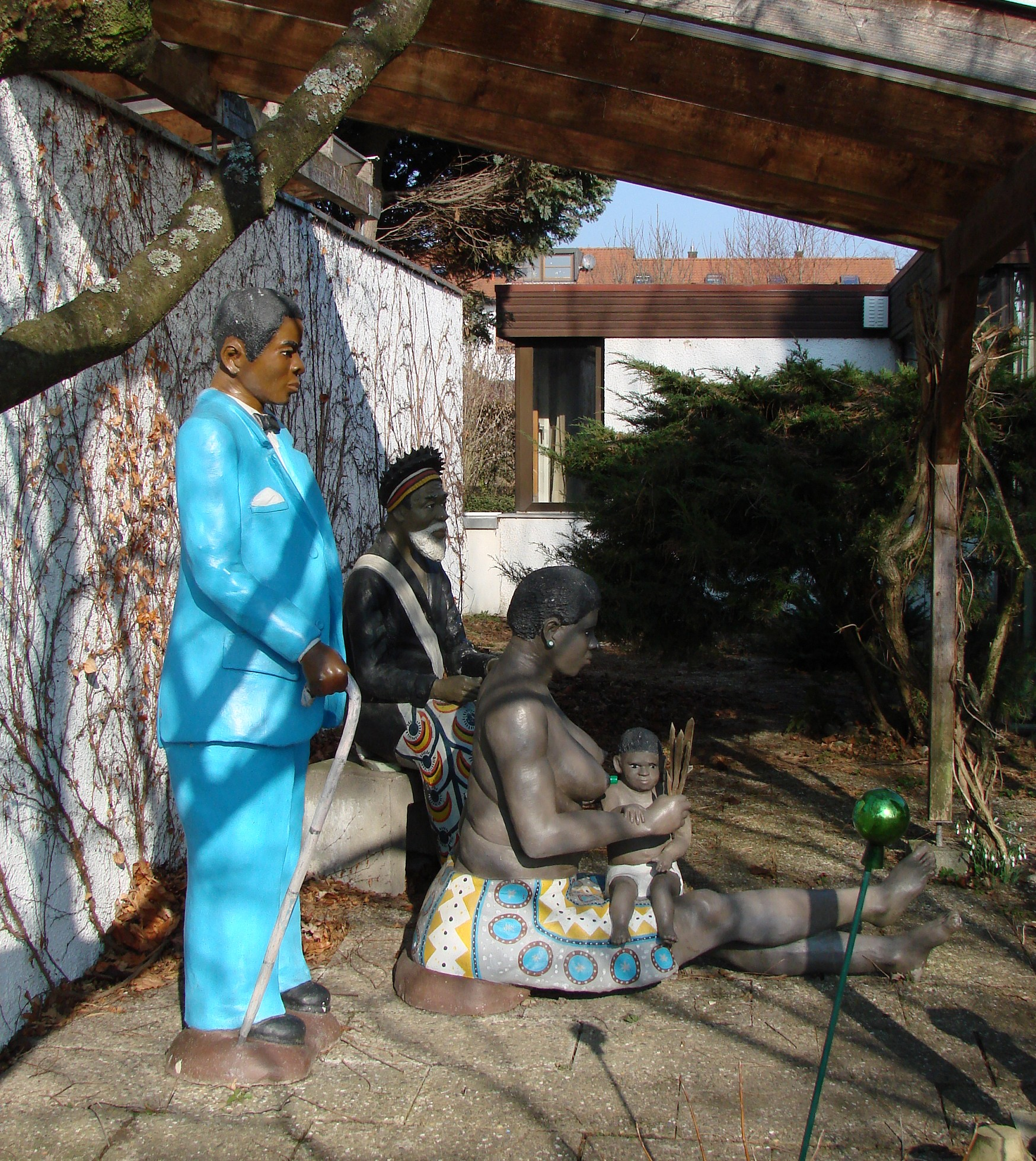
- Afrikahaus concrete sculptures 1986
- Born: 1 August 1940 (age 86); Ibesikpo
- Citizenship: Nigeria
- Occupations: Painter, Sculptor

Sunday Jack Akpan (born in Nigeria on 1 August 1940) is a Nigerian sculptor who has been described as "the contemporary African equivalent of the medieval artisan". He is noted for his work in cement, in which he crafts traditional-style statues of tribal leaders and other figures, mainly as grave art, which he then paints. He has also created other types of commercial art, including religious figures and business signage. His work has been shown at the Venice Biennale and at the Centre Pompidou in Paris, among other venues.

== Early life and education ==
Akpan was born in Ikot Ide Etuk Udo, in the district of Ibesikpo, Nigeria on 1 August 1940. The level of success in Akpan's education is currently unknown. Sunday Jack Akpan was taught layering brick, by Mr. Albert Edet Essien. This experience helped guide him to progress in his cement skills in sculpting his naturalistic large-scale figures.

== Career ==
Akpan is a post-war contemporary artist who has concentrated on sculpture, using cement to create traditional figures and grave artworks. Most of his figures are of African tribal leaders and are large-scale sculptures, and reflect his interest in the history of African culture. Akpan is ranked in the top 100,000 artists globally, but his best rank and time in his career was in 2001. His work has mainly featured in group exhibitions alongside works by artists including Frédéric Bruly Bouabré, Chéri Samba, and Bodys Isek Kingelez.

His first official exhibition was in 1989 in Paris at “Magiciens De La Terre" at Centre Pompidou in Paris. In 2001, his work featured at "La Biennale di Venezia" in Venice, Italy.

Akpan's work was included in "Africa Remix", an exhibition which toured various locations including the Museum Kunstpalast in Düsseldorf (2004), Hayward Gallery in London (2005), Centre Pompidou in Paris (2005), Moderna Museet in Sweden (2006), the Mori Art Museum in Tokyo (2006) and Johannesburg Art Gallery (2007).

In 2023, Akpan's work was included in an exhibition "Incarnations, le corps dans la collection" (The Body in the Collection) at the Musée d'Art Contemporain in Lyon, France.

Some of his work is in the collection of the Horniman Museum in London.

== Artworks ==
=== Public art ===
African Family (1986) - A sculpture in painted cement in Freiberg am Neckar, Germany.

No Title (1994) - a sculpture in painted cement of powerful and elegantly dressed African men facing forward, but also appearing to be seeking attention from passers-by. This artwork is in front of offices in Akebonocho, Tachikawa-shi, Japan.

=== Other artworks ===
- Bust of a Nigerian Chief (1986) - a depiction of a Nigerian chief or tribal leader, featuring a Nigerian man with a red shirt, dark-colored hair, and a slight smile on his face. The sculpture is typical of Akpan's West African traditional art style, and was exhibited at Expo 2000 in Hanover.
- Häuptling. 1986
- Nigerian Chief. 1986 (shown in Stuttgart in 1988, and at Centre Pompidou in 1989)
- Akwa. 1989
- Chief Efik. 1989
- Chief Rivers. 1989
- Chief Ibibio. 1989
- Chief Anang. 1989
- Chief Soldat Marius. 1989
- Chief Soldat Gaston. 1989
- Chief De La Police. 1989
- Chef en tenue européenne.1989
- Chief, 2001

== Publications ==
- Akpan, S. J., and A. O. Akpan. Zementskulpturen aus Nigeria: Sunday Jack Akpan, Aniedi Okon
- Akpan. Institut für Auslandsbeziehungen, 1988.
- Akpan S. J A. O Akpan Musée des beaux-arts de Calais and Association française d’action
- artistique. 1985. Sculptures En Ciment Du Nigeria De S.j. Akpan Et a.o. Akpan : 26
- Novembre—15 Décembre 1985. Paris: Association d’action artistique.
