= Luke Agada =

Nigerian painter

- Born: Luke Chidiebube Agada; 1992 (age 33–34); Lagos, Nigeria
- Citizenship: Nigerian
- Education: Doctor of Veterinary Medicine (DVM); Master of Fine Arts (MFA), Painting and Drawing
- Occupation: Visual artist
- Website: lukeagada.com

Luke Chidiebube Agada (born Lagos, 1992) is a Nigerian painter who lives and works in Chicago. His figurative, surrealist-leaning paintings show bodies, furniture and interiors that blur into one another, and critics have linked the work to themes of memory, migration and cultural displacement. He has had solo exhibitions with Monique Meloche in Chicago, Roberts Projects in Los Angeles and Sean Kelly in New York.

== Early life and education ==
Agada was born in Lagos in 1992. He studied veterinary medicine; however, in 2021, he left his veterinary career, and moved to Chicago to study painting at the School of the Art Institute of Chicago, and received an MFA in Painting and Drawing there in 2023.

== Career ==
Agada's first solo exhibition with Monique Meloche, Arms, Feet, and Fitful Dreams, was held in Chicago in 2023. In 2024, he was included in Newcity's "Breakout Artists" feature on Chicago's emerging image-makers.

In 2025, Monique Meloche presented To Translate is to Move Across. In 2026, Sean Kelly in New York presented When the Center Holds.

== Style of art ==
Agada's paintings are based within "traditions of Surrealism". He has cited Homi Bhabha's concept of the "third space", alongside literary references including Chinua Achebe.

== Work ==
Critics have described Agada's paintings as surreal scenes in which figures and interiors dissolve into their surroundings. Writing in Newcity in 2025, Jonathan Bonfiglio characterised the paintings as spectral depictions of time. In a 2026 Newcity review, Charles Venkatesh Young observed that the figures merge with the surface of the canvas and compared aspects of the work to Yves Tanguy, Salvador Dalí and Peter Saul.

When the Center Holds takes its title from a reversal of the line "the centre cannot hold" in W. B. Yeats's poem "The Second Coming", and draws on Chinua Achebe's Things Fall Apart.

== Exhibitions ==
=== Solo exhibitions ===
- 2023 – Arms, Feet, and Fitful Dreams, Monique Meloche Gallery, Chicago.
- 2024 – Between Two Suns, Roberts Projects, Los Angeles.
- 2025 – To Translate is to Move Across, Monique Meloche Gallery, Chicago.
- 2026 – When the Center Holds, Sean Kelly, New York.

=== Group exhibitions ===
- 2020 – Collective Reflection: Contemporary African and Diasporic Expressions of a New Vanguard, Gallery 1957, Ghana.
- 2021 – Unusual Suspects, African Artists' Foundation, Nigeria.
- 2023 – Where the Wild Roses Grow, Kristin Hjellegjerde Gallery, Germany.
