= Sam Ovraiti =

Nigerian painter

- Born: 1961; Zaria, Kaduna State
- Education: University of Benin, Edo State, Nigeria
- Known for: Painting and Art
- Awards: SNA Master Artist Award 2018

Sam Ovraiti (born 1961) is a Nigerian painter. He is the artistic director of the Harmattan Workshop, a gathering of artists founded by Dr. Bruce Onobrakpeya, a Nigerian printmaker. In 2018, he was awarded the Society of Nigerian Artists' Master Artist Award.

== Early life and education ==
In 1961, Sam was born in Zaria, Kaduna State. He started his education in Warri, Delta State. In 1983, he obtained a Higher National Diploma from the Federal Polytechnic, Auchi. He proceeded to the University of Benin, where he obtained a Master’s degree in Fine Arts.

== Academic career ==
Sam began his career as a teaching staff member at Auchi Polytechnic, where he taught painting and drawing from 1985 to 1993. His work in these media helped establish watercolour and chalk pastel as accepted media within Nigeria’s art community. In 1993, he left teaching and moved to Lagos to practise art full-time, before he shifted his focus toward oils, acrylics, and mixed media, while he still continued to explore colour as his central subject. He went on to build a collaboration with Bruce Onobrakpeya, and he was appointed artistic director of the Harmattan Workshop, which is held annually in Agbarha-Otor, Delta State. He has served as a member of the jury for national art competitions.

== Exhibition and recognition ==
Sam has taken part in solo and group exhibitions in Nigeria and abroad, and most of his paintings are being held in collections. His work has been part of the collections for the National Council for Art and Craft. His work has also been featured at the National Museum in Lagos. In April 2019, Alexis Gallery in Lagos hosted a retrospective exhibition marking his 36 years of practice, titled Sam Ovraiti, Retrospective: Exposition of 36 Years Romance with the Language of Colors, which featured forty of his oil and pastel paintings. He has also exhibited as part of the Harmattan Workshop's annual group exhibitions at Alexis Galleries in Victoria Island, Lagos. In 2018, he received the Society of Nigerian Artists' Master Artist Award.

== Awards ==
Award Name	Year
Society of Nigerian Artists' Master Artist Award 2018	2018
Nike Centre Award for Painter of the Year	2017
Guinness Top Three Award for Contemporary Artist in Nigeria	2024
Mobil Producing Winner of National Painting Competition	1983
