= Samson Akinnire =

Nigerian artist

- Born: Samson Olushola Akinnire; June 1, 1986; Ajegunle Lagos, Nigeria
- Education: Lagos State Polytechnic
- Occupation: Artist
- Known for: Sculpture and painting

Samson Akinnire (born 1 June 1986) is a Nigerian visual artist, painter and sculptor, based in Lagos state, Nigeria.

== Early life and education ==
Samson Akinnire was born and brought up in Ajegunle, Lagos State. He obtained a higher national diploma in Sculpture and design from the Lagos State Polytechnic in 2011 and was awarded all round student by his faculty.

== Selected exhibition ==
- 2018 Art X Lagos
- 2019 Say My Name exhibition in London
- 2019 Say My Name exhibition in Los Angeles
- 2020 Signature African Art Gallery · London, United Kingdom

== Selected works ==
- Say My Name 2020
- Values
- Play Time 2019
- Emergence 2019
- Gele Series II 2020
