= Lola Akinmade Åkerström =

Nigerian photographer, speaker, travel storyteller and author

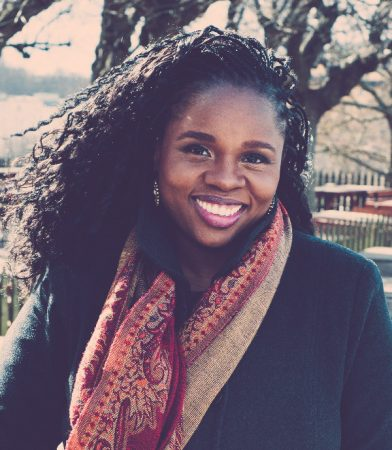
- Occupations: Photographer; Travel writer

Lola Akinmade Åkerström is a Nigerian photographer, speaker, travel storyteller and an international author whose books are published in 18 languages. She is based in Stockholm, Sweden. Her work focuses on culture, tradition, and lifestyle.

She is a Hasselblad Heroine and 2018 Bill Muster Travel Photographer of the Year. In January 2024 her novel, Everything is Not Enough, earned a nomination in the Outstanding Literary Work at the NAACP Awards. Åkerström is represented by Craig Literary for book and film rights through Jessica Craig. Some of her articles and photography have been syndicated on MSNBC, Slate, Yahoo, New York Daily News, Chicago Sun Times, Huffington Post, and Time Warner, and many more.

== Early life and education ==
She started her early life in Lagos state in southwest Nigeria, where she completed her early schooling before relocating to the United States at the age of 15. She studied Geography Information System (GIS) and holds a master's degree in information systems at the University of Maryland. At the age of 19, she gained admission to the University of Oxford in England but failed to pursue it because of funding issues. In 2006, Åkerström relocated to Sweden with her husband.

== Career ==
Her work focuses on culture, tradition, and lifestyle. Åkerström started her career as a field journalist at Eco-Challenge. She worked for 12 years as a GIS developer before becoming a professional photographer. Between 2006 and 2007, she joined Matador Network and worked as an editor. In October 2009 she resigned her appointment at the GIS world to pursue her passion. In June 2011, Åkerström contested in a pre-selection program organised by Quark Expeditions to pick a writer that will be traveling to the North Pole for the project of documenting its ecosystem. In 2012 she participated in the expedition race in Fiji, where she started the combination of her traveling, photography and writing skills. In 2016, she visited the Italian Unesco World Heritage Sites of Sabbioneta and Mantua for exploration.

She has dispatched from more than 80 countries and her work has appeared in publications, online and in print, including National Geographic Traveler, BBC, and CNN, The New York Times, The Guardian, Travel + Leisure, Lonely Planet, Vogue, BBC World Service, National Geographic Traveler, Travel Channel's World Hum, San Francisco Chronicle, Forbes Traveler, Sherman's Travel, Fodors.com, ISLANDS Magazine, United's Hemispheres, AFAR, Guardian UK's Been There, Smithsonian.com, City Magazine, The Away Network, Transitions Abroad, and The Matador Network. She has collaborated with brands such as Dove, Mercedes Benz, Intrepid Travel, Electrolux, and National Geographic Channel.

Her photography is in the National Geographic Image Collection and she is a member of Women Photograph and Wonderful Machine. She was recognized as one of the Most Influential People of African Descent (MIPAD) in Media & Culture, and she runs her own online academy, Geotraveler Media Academy, dedicated to storytelling.

She lives in Sweden, teaches travel writing and is the current editor-in-chief for Slow Travel Stockholm. She describes her writing as raw, real, and transparent, while her photography is filled with contrast, representing joy and hope.

== Personal life ==
In an interview with The Republic, she said that Black womanhood is not a monolithic experience and highlighted her experience raising biracial children in Sweden. She is a mother and a wife.

== Awards ==
Year	Class	Category	Awarding body	Work
2017	First place	Category 7: History	SATW	Enchanting Odense
2017	First place	Category 5: Sport or Adventure	SATW	Northern Lights
2017	First place	Category 4: Food and Wine	SATW	From Sea to Table
2017	Second place	Category 1: Single Destination	SATW	Stockholm
2017	First place	Category 1: Single Destination	SATW	Lagos
2016	Honorable Mention	Best in Travel Writing	Solas	Terracotta
2015	Gold	Category 127: 50+ Travel	NATJA	"The New Age of Adventure," Women's Adventure Magazine
2015	Silver	Category 125: Personality and Profiles	NATJA	The New Age of Adventure
2014	Bronze	Category 140: Local Lifestyle	NATJA	"The Silence of the Swedes," Roads & Kingdoms/Slate
2014	Bronze	Best in Travel Writing	Solas	Travel & Shopping – Fake Birds
2013	Silver	Category 193: Travel Tips & Advice	NATJA	"5 Ways to Get More Mileage From Smart Phone Photos," Mashable
2013	Silver	Category 140: Local Lifestyle	NATJA	"The Silence of the Swedes," Roads & Kingdoms/Slate
2013	Silver	Category 172: Landscape, Seascape	NATJA	"10 Tips for Photographing Northern Lights," Fodor's
2013	Finalist	Category 125: Personality and Profiles	NATJA	"Insight-Ice Hotel/Arne Bergh," Qatar Airways Oryx Inflight Magazine
2013	Finalist	Category 149: Culinary Travel	NATJA	"Navigating Gothenburg’s Culinary Scene," BBC Travel
2013	Gold Award	Best in Travel Writing	Solas	Culture and Ideas – Decoding Lagom (Sweden)
2013	Regional Award Winner: Africa		The Hot Mommas Project	Press Release
2012	Bronze	Category 173: Portrait, People	NATJA	"Through the Lens: Kwazulu-natal, South Africa,” National Geographic Channel
2012	Silver	Category 149: Culinary Travel	NATJA	"10 Things to Know About Sweden’s Food Culture," Sweden.se
2012	Finalist	Category 132: Eco, Environmental or Special Purpose Travel	NATJA	"Stockholm’s Green Groove," Thai Airways’ Sawasdee In-Flight Magazine
2012	Silver	Category 176: Photo Essay	NATJA	"The Spirit of Lapland," Wild Junket
2012	Silver	Best in Travel Writing	Solas	Travel and Food – Meat My Love (Global)
2011	Gold	Category 145: Personality and Profiles (Internet)	NATJA	"Slow Food From Sápmi" – Sweden.se
2011	Gold	Category 149: Culinary Travel (Internet)	NATJA	"Revamping classic Irish tea at Dublin’s Merrion Hotel" – Matador Network
2011	Silver	Best in Travel Writing	Solas	Travel and Food – Sweet Pillows (Portugal)
2011	Judges’ Vote		Black Weblog Awards	Best International Blog – Geotraveler's Niche
2011	Silver (Group Award)	Lowell Thomas Award	Society of American Travel Writers (SATW)	Online Travel Journalism Site-Matador Network
2010	Silver	Category 140: Local Lifestyle (Internet)	NATJA	Back to Sender" – Matador Network
2010	Bronze Award	Category 120: Local Lifestyle (Print)	NATJA	"Röckåbilly" – Hemispheres
2010	Silver (Group Award)	Lowell Thomas Award	Society of American Travel Writers (SATW)	Online Travel Journalism Site – Matador Network
2010	Gold Award	Best in Travel Writing	NATJA	Travel and Shopping – Walkway to Nowhere (Nigeria)
2009	Bronze Award	Best in Travel Writing	NATJA	Travel and Shopping – Market Hopping Around Lagos (Nigeria)
2008	Runner-up Winner	Narrative Travel Writing Contest	NATJA	Transitions Abroad – Market Hopping Around Lagos (Nigeria)
