= Aisha Augie-Kuta =

Nigerian photographer and filmmaker

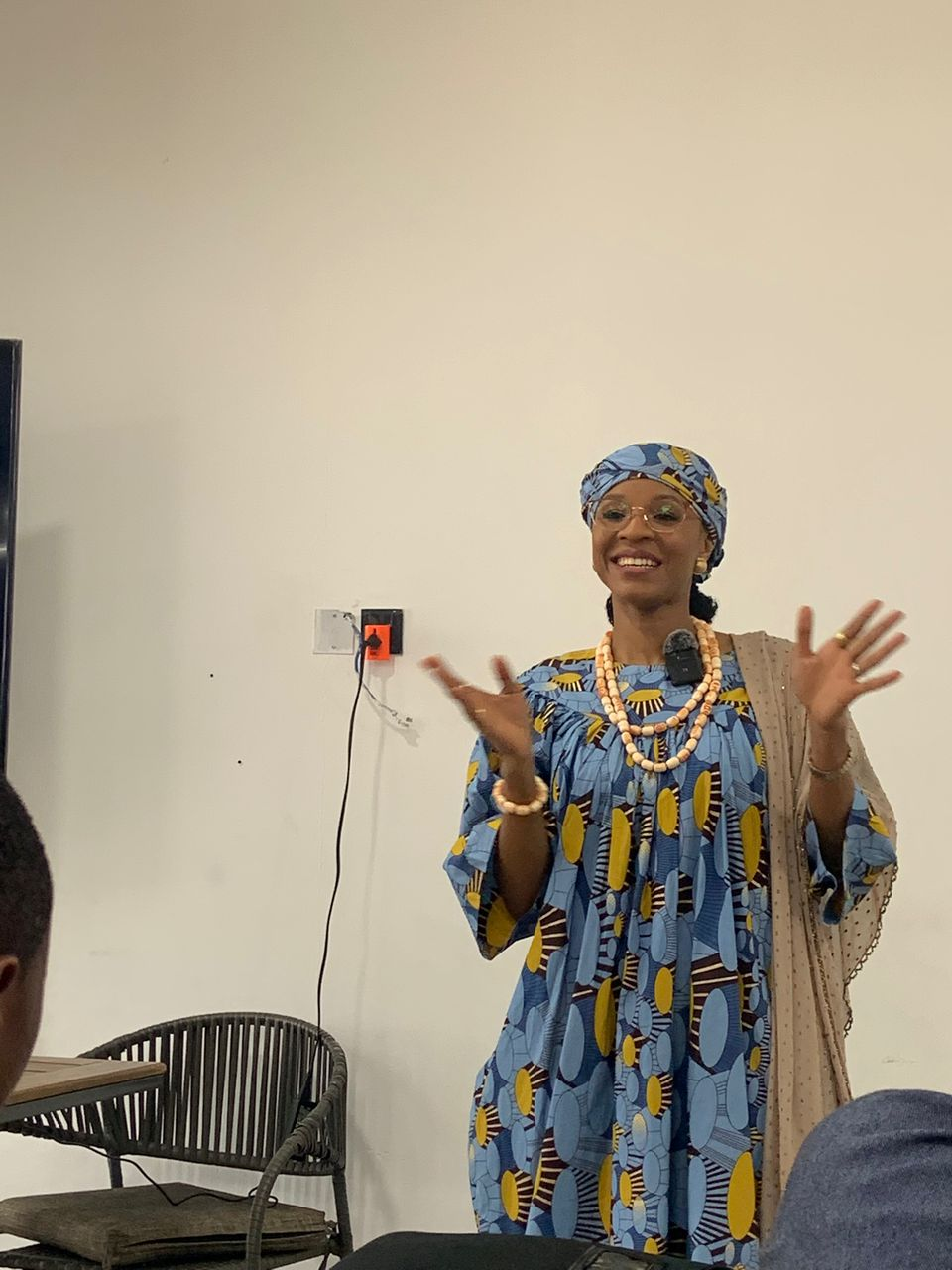
- Born: 11 April 1980 (age 46)
- Citizenship: Nigerian
- Education: Ahmadu Bello University
- Occupations: Photographer and Filmmaker
- Children: 3
- Parents: Late Adamu Baba Augie (father); Amina Augie (mother)
- Awards: Creative Artist of the year at the 2011 The Future Awards.

Aisha Augie-Kuta (born 11 April 1980) is a Nigerian photographer and filmmaker based in Abuja. She is a Hausa from Argungu Local Government Area in northern Nigeria. She won the award for Creative Artist of the year at the 2011 The Future Awards. Her work spans across documentary, fashion and aerial photography. She uses juxtaposition in her work as her way of pushing the idea that there are always two sides of a story; this comes from her background in photojournalism and Mass Communication. Her personal projects explore issues of gender and identity influenced by her experiences as a female, mixed race and mixed tribe individual who struggled to fit in earlier in life.

Augie-kuta is the current Director-General at the Centre For Black and African Arts Culture (CBAAC), she was formerly Special Adviser (Digital Communications Strategy) to the Federal Minister of Finance, Budget and National Planning. Prior to this she was the Senior Special Assistant to the Governor of Kebbi State, Nigeria on New Media. Augie-Kuta leads various development initiatives for the advocacy of youth and women empowerment across Nigeria.

== Biography ==
Born Aisha Adamu Augie in Zaria, Kaduna State, Nigeria, Augie-Kuta is the daughter of the late Senator Adamu Baba Augie (politician/broadcaster), and Justice Amina Augie (JSC). Augie-Kuta became interested in photography when her father gave her a camera at a young age.

== Education ==
Augie-Kuta received a bachelor's degree in Mass Communication from Ahmadu Bello University, Zaria and is studying for an MSc in Media and communication at the Pan African University, Lagos (Now Pan Atlantic University). She is married with three children. Augie-Kuta has certificates in digital filmmaking from the New York Film Academy and curating contemporary art exhibitions from the Chelsea College of Arts, London, UK.

== Career ==
Augie-Kuta became an Associate for the Nigeria Leadership Initiative (NLI) in May 2011. She is also the vice-president of Women in Film and Television in Nigeria (WIFTIN) the West African chapter of the US-based network. She co-founded the Photowagon, a Nigerian photography collective, in 2009.

In 2010, Augie-Kuta was included, along with 50 other Nigerian women, in a book and exhibition for the nation's 50@50 celebrations supported by the Women for Change Initiative.

In 2014, Augie-Kuta held her first solo photographic exhibition, entitled Alternative Evil.

She has made contributions toward girl child/youth development and nation building. She has been a frequent facilitator at the annual gathering of photographers, Nigeria Photography Expo & Conference; a panelist and speaker at various events; and has spoken at TEDx events in Nigeria.

Augie-Kuta was sworn in as a UNICEF High-Level Women Advocate on Education with a focus on girls and young women.

In 2018, Augie-Kuta was the lead representative for the Nigerian Visual Arts sector that met with His Royal Highness Charles, Prince of Wales at the British Council in Lagos.

Augie-Kuta is the first female politician to run for the house of representatives primaries under a major party for the Argungu-Augie Federal Constituency in Kebbi State, Nigeria. Augie-Kuta is a frequent facilitator at the annual gathering of photographers, Nigeria Photography Expo & Conference; a panelist and speaker at various events; and has spoken at TEDx events in Nigeria.

She worked as the Senior Special Assistant to the Governor of Kebbi State, Nigeria on New Media.

She currently works as the Special Adviser to the Minister of Finance, Budget and National Planning, Mrs Zainab Shamsuna Ahmed.

== Awards ==
- 2011: Winner, Creative Artist of the Year at The Future Awards
- 2014: Sisterhood Award for Photographer of the Year
- 2014: Winner, British Council 'Through-My-Eyes' competition
- 2015: Ambassador, Lagos Fashion Week
- 2016: Award of Excellence, (Leadership & Service to Humanity), Junior Chamber International
- 2016: Top 7 Young Nigerian Entrepreneurs, Leadership
- 2016: HiLWA: High Level Women Advocate, (Girl Child Education & Affirmative Action) UNICEF/Kebbi State Government
- 2016: Fellow, Korea International Cooperation Agency

== Exhibitions ==
- 50 Years Ahead through the Eyes of Nigerian Women, Lagos, (Schlumberger, The Embassy of the Kingdom of Netherlands, African Artists Foundation)
- 50 Years Ahead through the Eyes of Nigerian Women, Abuja, Nigeria; April 2010 (Transcorp Hilton, The Embassy of the Kingdom of Netherlands, African Artists Foundation)
- Here and Now: Contemporary Nigerian and Ghanaian Art, New York City, October 2010 (Iroko Arts Consultants, Ronke Ekwensi).
- The Authentic Trail: Breast Cancer, Fundraising Exhibition, Abuja, Nigeria, October 2010 (Medicaid Diagnostics, Pinc Campaign, Aisha&Aicha)
- My Nigeria; The Photowagon Exhibits, Abuja, Nigeria, December 2010 (The Photowagon, Thought Pyramid Gallery)
- Water and Purity, African Artists Foundation, Lagos, Nigeria, September 2012
- The Nigerian Centenary Photography exhibition, July 2014
- Material culture, Lagos Photo Festival, October–November 2014
- Alternative Evil, Mixed Media Exhibition, IICD Abuja, Nigeria 2014
- Countless Miles, Nigerian Travel Exhibition, Miliki Lagos, Nigeria 2016
- Before, Before & Now, Now, Mira Forum, Art Tafeta Porto, Portugal, 2016
- To mark new beginnings: Africa’ African Steeze Los Angeles, USA, 2016
- Consumption by moonlight, Environmental Art Collective Abuja, Nigeria, 2015
- Photo Junctions, Thought pyramid Art Centre Abuja, Nigeria, 2015

== Publications ==
- 50@50 Nigerian Women: The journey so far. Nigeria: Rimson Associates. 2010. pp. 32–35. ISBN 978-978-8033-05-9.

== See also ==
- List of Nigerian film producers
