= Asiru Olatunde =

Nigerian artist, blacksmith, and painter

- Born: Osogbo, Nigeria
- Died: 1993

Asiru Olatunde (1918–1993) was a Nigerian artist, blacksmith, and painter, often regarded as one of the prominent painters from Osogbo. He was one of a small group of artists who were part of a creative community known as the Oshogbo School of art. His illustrations were centered around Yoruba mythology as well as Biblical stories, combined with local folklore

== Biography ==
Asiru Olatunde was born into a family of blacksmiths but illness forced him to give up as a blacksmith in the 1960s. He temporarily made jewelry to sell in the market, before transitioning into painting on the advice of Uilli Beier and Suzanne Wenger in 1961. He adopted a technique known as repousse metalwork, which usually involves the shaping of copper, aluminum and iron to derive his artwork. He created animal figurines out of recycled copper and aluminum.

His exhibition has been showcased at IMF headquarters, as well as the Smithsonian Institution.

=== Death ===
He died in 1993.

=== Selected notable works ===
- Tree of Life
