= Yetunde Ayeni-Babaeko =

Nigerian photographer (born 1978)

- Born: 1978 (age 47–48); Enugu, Nigeria
- Education: Macromedia School of Art and Design, Osnabrück
- Occupation: Photographer
- Years active: 2005–present
- Organization(s): Camara Studios, Yetunde Ayeni-Babaeko (YAB)
- Known for: Photography
- Website: yetundeayenibabaeko.com

Yetunde Ayeni-Babaeko (born 1978) is a Nigerian photographer.

== Early life and background ==
Ayeni-Babaeko was born in Enugu, Eastern Region, Nigeria in 1978. Her father was Nigerian and her mother was German. She moved to Germany as a child, attending secondary school there and completing a photography apprenticeship at Studio Be in Greven. In 2005 she returned to Nigeria. In 2007 she opened her own studio, Camara Studios, based in Ikeja.

== Personal life ==
Ayeni-Babaeko is married to Steve Babaeko. They got married in 2006 after their proposal in Germany, where Ayeni-Babaeko grew up. They now have three boys: Louis, Lamar, and Austin.

== Exhibitions and projects ==
Ayeni-Babaeko's 2014 exhibition 'Eko Moves', in collaboration with the Society for Performing Arts of Nigeria (SPAN), portrayed dancers in public spaces in Lagos. The project placed choreographed dancers in everyday urban environments across the city, exploring the contrast between staged movement and ordinary public space. The work was developed as part of Ayeni-Babaeko's broader collaboration with the dance company SPAN.

Her 2019 exhibition 'White Ebony' highlighted the situation of people with albinism in Nigeria. The exhibition was shown at Temple Muse in Lagos, presented by SMO Contemporary Art, and was timed to coincide with International Albinism Awareness Day. It consisted of twenty photographs developed through Ayeni-Babaeko's collaboration with The Albino Foundation Lagos. Ayeni-Babaeko conducted extended interviews with members of the foundation prior to the shoot, describing the resulting body of work as the product of long conversations about her subjects' daily experiences and social perceptions of albinism. The exhibition was described by Temple Muse's CEO Avinash Wadhwani as an example of art for social change.

== Workshops and mentorship ==
Ayeni-Babaeko has facilitated photography workshops and training sessions, including programmes organised in collaboration with the Goethe-Institut, focusing on photography practice and professional development. Participants have included emerging photographers from Nigeria.

== Recent activities ==
In 2025, Ayeni-Babaeko participated in photography projects including the Starke Frauen. Starkes Handwerk competition hosted by the Handwerkskammer Dortmund, featuring photo stories on women in craft and visual storytelling.

She also documented cultural events such as the Abo Egungun Festival in Kogi State as part of her ongoing photography work.
