= Lemi Ghariokwu =

Nigerian artist (born 1955)

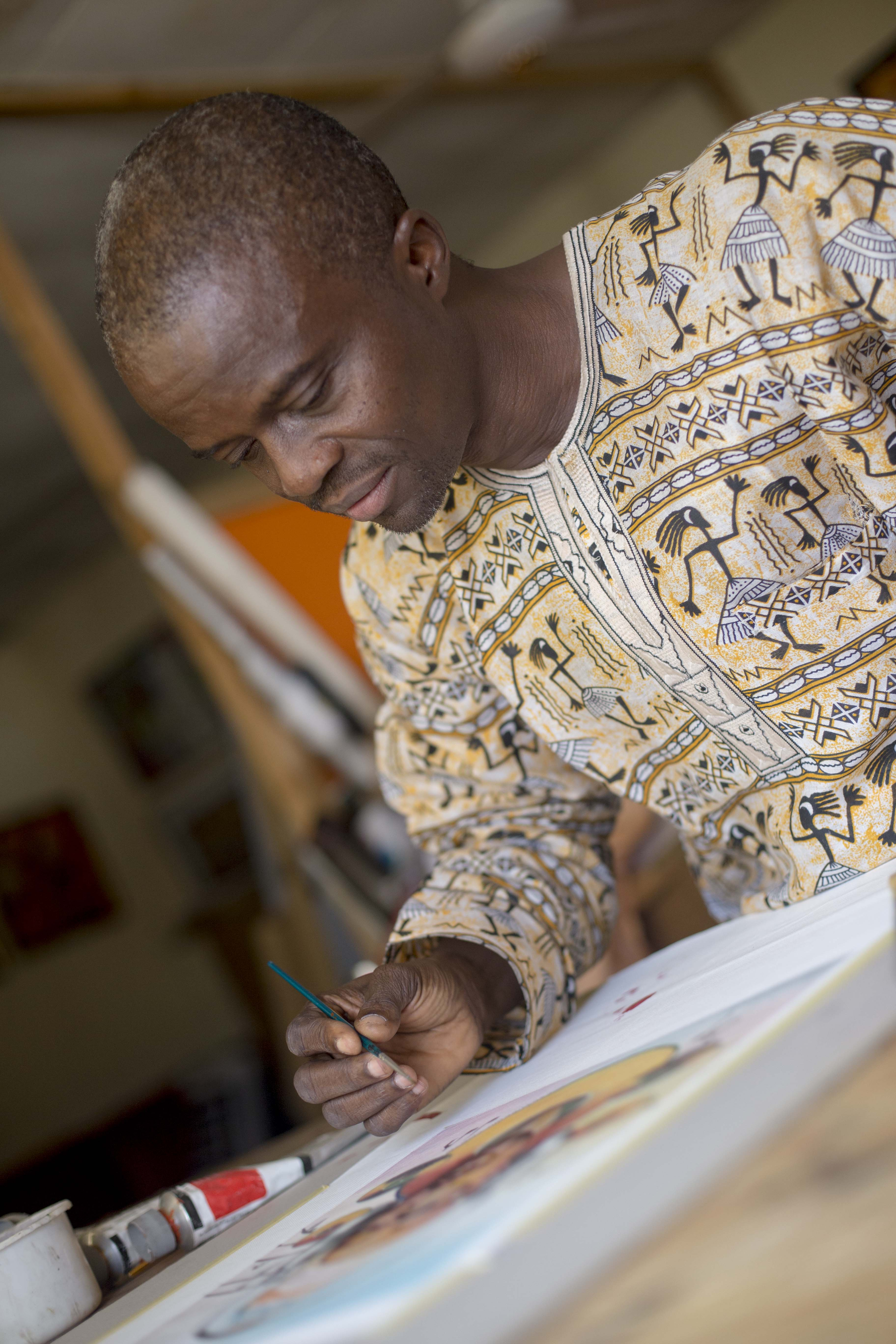
- Photo by Emmanuel Komolafe
- Born: Emmanuel Sunday; December 26, 1955 (age 70); Agege, Lagos, Nigeria
- Notable work: Designer of 26 album covers for Fela Kuti and covers for Polygram Records
- Website: http://www.lemighariokwu.com

Lemi Ghariokwu (born Emmanuel Sunday; 26 December 1955), also known simply as Lemi, is a Nigerian painter, illustrator and designer who is most renowned for providing many of the original cover images for the recordings of Nigerian musician Fela Kuti.

== Biography ==
Lemi Abiodun Ghariokwu was born Emmanuel Sunday on 26 December 1955, in Agege, Lagos, Nigeria. He is from Agbor, Delta State but has spent all his life in Lagos. He grew up in Igbobi, Fadeyi in Lagos State with his parents and siblings. During his school days, he often spent his long vacations at Ajegunle. His father wanted him to be a mechanical engineer, so he attended a technical school, Yaba College of Technology Secondary School, where he studied technical and science subjects, but this was where his school journey ended. He decided to train himself to master his own style of art. Although his formal academic journey ended here, education did not. He read and equipped himself constantly with knowledge and developed his art skill alongside. He grew up listening to Reggae songs and studying metaphysics. His maturity into self and social consciousness was facilitated by Fela Kuti, Peter Tosh, Marcus Garvey, Malcolm X, Kwame Nkrumah and Steve Biko. Lemi is married with four children – Asilem Eweka, Tamara Ajasa, Omotosho, and Odafin-Nevo Shekinah.

== Lemi and Fela ==
Lemi met Fela Kuti in 1974 through Babatunde Harrison (a journalist for Sunday Punch). After Harrison walked into a pub and stumbled on an art work Lemi had done for the pub owner, he requested to see more and he saw one of the illustrations Lemi did of Roforofo Fight. This spurred him to take Lemi to meet Fela. On this first meeting, Fela was impressed with Lemi's work and offered to pay him but he refused the money. This became his ticket into Kalakuta Republic. Lemi's relationship with Fela Anikulapo Kuti was very cordial. He gave Lemi total freedom with his work and thoughts to the level that he just did as he pleased, albeit responsibly, with how and what he wanted to express. Lemi had the rare privilege of putting his photograph and comments on some of the covers and was treated like a son, friend, adviser and comrade by the Afrobeat legend. Ghariokwu's approach to his work with Kuti involved listening to and digesting the music and then expressing his reaction in his paintings, design and comments, which provide a high level of detail on the many album covers he delivered. On 2 August 2024, Lemi wrote about his journey with Fela on Rolling Stone Africa.

== Career ==
=== Art ===
Ghariokwu's work involves a variety of styles, often using vibrant colours and individuated typefaces of his own design. His art is said to be rebellious, comical, political, even erotic but most of all he is a genius in pictorial narration, realism and iconicity. Many of Ghariokwu's cover images echo and sometimes comment on the work and politics of the recordings that they accompany, serving a consciously integrated meta-textual function. He is famous for his captivating and intricate record sleeves designs and he never fails to give life to lyrics through his pictorial images. He created and mastered 26 of Fela's album covers. The Observer Music Magazine called Ghariokwu "King of Covers" during his solo exhibition in the UK in 2004.

Aside from designing 26 album covers for Fela Anikulapo Kuti, Ghariokwu also designed covers for Osita Osadebe, James Iroha, Bob Marley, Kris Okotie, Lucky Dube, Gilles Peterson, Miriam Makeba, and about a hundred other musicians across the globe. In the early 1980s, Ghariokwu was the consulting album cover designer for Polygram (Phonogram+Polydor) records in Nigeria for 11 years. He also printed and designed album covers for many Kennis Music artists, including 2 Face, Lagbaja, Kenny St. Brown, Sound Sultan and many others, for 11 years. Ghariokwu has designed more than 2000 album covers and facilitated art workshops abroad. He designed for EMI, CBS and Ivory music. He also designed logos for Fame Weekly, Ivory Music and National Encomium.

MTV president Mark Rosenthal commissioned the painting Everybody's Gotta be Somebody from Ghariokwu. This inspired a film documentary by Aaron Koenisberg. Ghariokwu's work has attracted much attention in the West and is the subject of various retrospective exhibitions. His painting Anoda Sistem, created in 2002, is in the permanent collection of the Museum of Modern Art.

Some of Ghariokwu's archive is now in the possession of Punch Records, whose CEO Ammo Talwar has invited the academic community to utilise this material in productive ways.

In 2008, twenty of Ghariokwu's artworks were published in Area 2, a book showcasing 100 emerging and influential graphic artists in the world, published by Phaidon Press in New York.

He also designed the cover of Cassava Republic's republication of Fela: This Bitch of a Life – the authorised biography of Fela Kuti by Carlos Moore. In June 2010, Ghariokwu was commissioned and successfully branded FELA-BUS, a sort of marketing mural-on-wheels, for the producers of the hit Broadway musical Fela! in New York.

Ghariokwu designed the cover art for Brymo's sixth studio album Oṣó (2018) and Falz's fourth studio album Moral Instruction (2019).

In 2024, Ghariokwu designed the visuals for Pop Central's "70 Years of Music in Nigeria."

=== Exhibitions ===
Ghariokwu's work has been exhibited internationally for more than a decade.

- 2002: Lagos: Past and Present. Group exhibition in conjunction with Muson Art Festival Week. Curated by Chike Uwaogudu. Muson Centre, Onikan, Lagos, Nigeria. Also exhibited at Nimbus Art Center, Lagos, May 2002.
- 2003: Group exhibition that was a Sophie Sanders/Lemi Ghariokwu collaboration. Southfirst Gallery, Brooklyn, New York.
- 2003: Black President: The Art and Legacy of Fela Anikulapo Kuti. Group exhibition that included Lemi Ghariokwu. New Museum of Contemporary Art, New York, 11 July–19 September 2003.
- 2004: Works on Paper. A group exhibition that included Ghariokwu Lemi. Curated by Maika Pollack and Florian Altenburg. Southfirst Gallery, Brooklyn, New York, 23 January–7 March 2004.
- 2004: Everybody's Gotta Be Somebody: a Ghariokwu Lemi Story. Documentary film by Aaron Konisberg on Ghariokwu Lemi's painting. US premiere at the Jump N' Funk, Coral Room, New York, 28 May 2004, and UK premiere at the Spitz Gallery, London, 4 October 2004.
- 2004: The Art of GHARIOKWU LEMI: P. E. A. C. E (Pictorial Evolution Acknowledging Conscious Emancipation). First solo exhibition in the UK. Curated by Debbie Sealy. Spitz Gallery, London, 23 September–17 October 2004.
- 2006: Eyes of Africa. Group exhibition that included Ghariokwu Lemi. Curated by Liz Bagnal. Buntingford, UK, July 2006.
- 2006: Political Cartoons from Nigeria: Ghariokwu Lemi, Comfort Jacobs and Lordwealth Ololade. Three-person exhibition. Curated by Maika Pollack and Florian Altenburg. Works made between 1975 and 2006 by three Nigerian artists. The cartoons, originally intended for a Nigerian audience, deal with figures such as Nigerian president Olusegun Obasanjo, corruption at all levels of government, and American foreign policy. Southfirst Gallery, Brooklyn, NY, 10 November–17 December 2006.
- 2007: AmeriKKKa. Group exhibition that included Ghariokwu Lemi and Roberto Visani. Curated by Mariko Tanaka and Raul Zamudio. Artist Network Gallery, New York, 19 January–16 February 2007.
- 2007: From Taboo to Icon: Africanist Turnabout. Group exhibition of 32 artists working in all media. Curated by Sophie Sanders and Shervone Neckles. Included: Sophia Ainslie, Ruby Amanze, Maya Freelon Asante, Terry Boddie, Kimberly Camp, Syd Carpenter, Colin Chase, Sonya Clark, Jamal Cyrus, John Dowell, Earl Fyffe, Lonnie Graham, Theodore Harris, Melvina Lathan, Franky LaudeB, Betty Leacraft, Simone Leigh, Ghariokwu Lemi, Heather Marie Davis-Jones, Tyrone Mitchell, Ayanah Moor, Keith Morrison, Karyn Olivier, Nadine Patterson, Debra Priestly, Hank Willis Thomas, Juana Valdes, Deborah Willis, et al. Ice Box Project Space, Crane Arts Center, Philadelphia, 10 January–10 February 2007.
- 2007: Democrazy: GHARIOKWU LEMI and the Art of the Album Cover. Solo exhibition. Curated by Bisi Silva. Centre for Contemporary Art (CCA), Lagos, Nigeria, 8 December 2007 – 20 January 2008.
- 2008: Lagos: Paradigm Shift – Art Exhibition of Design and Paintings by GHARIOKWU LEMI, Legendary Cover Artist, Illustrator and Graphic Designer. Solo exhibition. Curated by Chigaza Hanum. Harmattan Workshop Gallery, Victoria Island, Lagos, Nigeria. 22–28 November 2008.
- 2009: GHARIOKWU LEMI: Afro-Pop Art: Politics, Life and Lyrics. Solo exhibition. Artists Resource Collective (ARC) gallery, London, UK. 15 October–12 November 2009.
- 2013: Art's Own Kind: "Vintage Lemi", Axiomatic Expressions and AfroPop Series. The sixth solo exhibition powered by Bloom art. Curated by Ugoma Adegoke, co-founder of the LifeHouse. Didi Museum, Lagos, Nigeria. 25–30 May 2013.
- 2013: Polemics. A solo exhibition. Red Door Gallery, Lagos, Nigeria. December 2013–January 2014.
- 2014: Afro Art Beat. Lemi's work was exhibited at a salon art exhibition powered by Red Door Gallery, hosted by Zircon Marine Limited. Saatchi Gallery (The Mess Room), Chelsea, London, 16 February 2014.
- 2015: The Reinvented Covers. Solo exhibition powered by Bloom art. Curated by Ugoma Adegoke. Lagos, Nigeria, 8 November–8 December 2015.
- 2016: Art X Lagos. Lemi's work was exhibited at Art X Lagos. Curated by Bloom Art Lagos (Ugoma Adegoke and assisted by Blessing Abeng). Lagos, Nigeria, 4–6 November 2016.
- 2017: Afro Art Beat. An exhibition of Lemi Ghariokwu's work in partnership with Temple Management. Lagos, Nigeria, 21 October 2017.

== Other projects ==
=== Music ===
In 1992, Ghariokwu composed a single, featuring Daniel Wilson, titled "Omolakeji". He is passionate about songwriting and music with depth.

=== Fashion ===
In 2015, a pioneering, innovative and socially conscious footwear brand called KEEXS was launched in Nigeria, Africa by the founder Babajide Ipaye. Some of the shoe collection was inspired by some of Ghariokwu's art works.

== Awards ==
- Nigeria Music Awards' Record Sleeve of the year
- Fame Music awards
- Favorite Sleeve Designer

== See also ==
- Ikechukwu Francis Okoronkwo
- Nengi Omuku
- Ade Adekola
- Newen Afrobeat
