= Mike Omoighe =

Nigerian artist (1958–2021)

Michael Akhaine Osebhajimete Omoighe (11 July 1958 – 23 January 2021), better known as Mike Omoighe, was a Nigerian painter, curator, art critic and teacher of art. Born in Opoji Ekpoma area of Edo State in Nigeria, he grew up and lived in Lagos, Nigeria most of his life.

Omoighe studied at Yaba College of Technology (1978, ND); at Auchi Polytechnic, Auchi (1980, HND); at the University of Lagos - UNILAG (1987, Certificate in Polytechnic Management (CPM) NBTE) and at the University of Ibadan (1994, Master's degree in Visual Arts Communication M.C.A.) He was a pupil of the painter and graphic artist, Bruce Onobrakpeya.

From 1986 till his demise, Omoighe taught painting and drawing at the Yaba College of Technology, where he had been the Head of the Department of Fine Art, Dean of School of Art, Design and Printing and Dean of Student Affairs at Yaba College of Technology, Lagos Nigeria. He was also the Nigerian President of the International Association of Art Critics, AICA.

Omoighe was married to the painter Titi Omoighe, with children. He died from COVID-19 complications on January 23, 2021, at the age of 62.

== Solo exhibitions ==
- 1980: Auchi, Bendel State
- 1982: National Arts Theatre, Iganmu, Lagos
- 1983: Goethe-Institut, Lagos
- 1984: Italian Cultural Centre, Lagos
- 1984: Scruples, 28 Bode Thomas, Surulere, Lagos
- 1988: Italian Cultural Centre, Lagos
- 1990: Alliance Francaise, Kano; Journey Through Savannah, Didi Museum, Lagos
- 1993: Emotion, National Museum, Onikan, Lagos
- 1996: Beijing Series - Chevron Lekki Lagos
- 1996/1997: Jacinta's Place, Probyn Street Ikoyi Lagos (Salon)
- 2000: Survival Romance, National Gallery of Art, Iganmu, Lagos
- 2005: Seasons and Chain of Coincidences, National Museum, Lagos
