= Dipo Doherty =

Nigerian artist (born 1991)

- Born: Dipo; 1991 (age 34–35); Nigeria
- Citizenship: Nigeria
- Education: University of Virginia, Massachusetts Institute of Technology
- Occupations: Artist, painter
- Awards: The Future Awards Africa

Dipo Doherty (born 1991) is a Nigerian painter.

== Education and career ==
Born in 1991, Dipo holds a Bsc. in Mechanical engineering from the University of Virginia. He completed his master's degree in Integrated Design and Management from Massachusetts Institute of Technology. His work centers around spatial geometry.

== Awards and exhibitions ==
He was selected as one of the exhibitors at ART X Lagos 2017. His works were part of the artworks donated at the Arthouse's Affordable Art Auction for charity in Lagos. He was nominated for the Visual Art category at The Future Awards Africa 2019.
