= Solomon Osagie Alonge =

Nigerian photographer (1911–1994)

Chief Solomon Osagie Alonge
- Born: 1911; Benin City
- Died: 1994 (aged 82–83)
- Occupation: Royal court photographer
- Years active: 1926–1989

Chief Solomon Osagie Alonge (1911–1994) was a self-taught photographer and pioneer of Nigerian photography. He was the first official photographer for the royal court of Benin City, Nigeria, and a chief in the Iwebo palace society. Alonge's record of Nigerian royalty and social class is one of the most extensive and well-preserved collections from the period.

== Life ==
Alonge was born in Benin City in 1911. He learned English at the Benin Baptist Elementary School and at the age of 14 moved to Lagos to live with an uncle to learn a profession. There, he developed an interest in photography and took on an apprenticeship. In 1930, Alonge returned to Benin and began practising photography from his home on Ugbague Street. He frequently travelled outside Benin City, taking school portraits and photographing gatherings at social clubs, sporting events, and government ceremonies. When the son of the current oba, the Edo word for "ruler", took over in 1933, Alonge became his court photographer, documenting the final and elaborate traditional burial ceremony for Oba Akenzua's mother in 1935.

Alonge's talent was recognized early on by the British, and he was asked to take photographs for the colonial administrators in the 1930s and 1940s. In the late 1930s, he became a founding member of the Benin Social Circle, a group of businessmen, leaders, and the educated elite. He served as treasurer of the Central Baptist Church for over 20 years.

In 1942, he created the Ideal Photo Studio in Benin City, where he quickly developed a reputation as a young, hard-working professional and an honest businessman. The studio soon became a popular location to have portraits taken. He experimented with a variety of techniques, and he began creating product advertisements, documenting construction projects, photographing parties, and covering business conferences for local companies like Guinness Brewery. He also photographed official ceremonies and historical events for the Nigerian government. In 1956, Alonge photographed Queen Elizabeth's visit to meet Oba Akenzua II at the Benin airport. He also recorded the oba shaking hands with Princess Alexandra, who declared Nigeria independent in 1960, on a visit to Benin in 1963.

== Photography ==
Alonge's work spans half a century and records the reigns of Oba Akenzua II (1933–1978) and Oba Erediauwa (1979–2016). Alonge photographed the political and social events surrounding the royal palace, including the royal wives and children, visiting dignitaries and politicians, and annual festivals and court ceremonies. Over 3,000 of Alonge's photographs have been archived at the Smithsonian National Museum of African Art.

His style combined traditional and modern motifs. Alonge took portraits outdoors with a large format, glass plate camera and a locally made studio backdrop. Using kerosene lanterns, he developed the glass plate negatives at night and contact printed the images on gaslight paper. Reading instruction booklets from Kodak and Ilford, he taught himself to mix his own chemicals and use sunlight to develop his prints. In 1940, Alonge began to retouch, sepia tone, and hand-colour his photographs. When electricity came to Benin in 1945, he was able to take studio portraits and develop his photos indoors. Alonge's first camera was a Kodak Brownie; later, he used a Rolleiflex and other 35 mm cameras, and finally high-speed film.

Alonge's photographs were intended for his subjects, for private home use, and for his personal interest in building a visual record. His subjects chose their own attire and presented themselves to the camera in preferred cultural attitudes.

== Historical impact ==
In the late 1800s, the British seized control of Benin City, bringing with them their photographic traditions. British photographers depicted locals through the viewpoint of the colonist. The first photographs of Benin depicted defeated royal families in exile, burned palaces, and "punitive" expeditions. As the first indigenous royal court photographer, Alonge changed this narrative. His work helped to usher in an era of Nigerians representing themselves and acting as keepers of their own history. This shift allowed the subjects to present themselves in a way that they felt was dignified. One such photograph was that of a proud Oba Akenzua II displaying the royal regalia of his grandfather, Ovonramwen, that was returned by the British to Benin in 1938.

Alonge's photography preserves an important historical record of Benin arts and culture during the periods of British colonial rule and the transition to Nigerian independence during the 1950s and 1960s.

The National Museum of African Art in Washington, D.C., exhibited Alonge's work beginning in September 2014, displaying some of his rarely seen photographs. The exhibition, which coincided with the Nigerian celebration of 100 years as a united country, was curated by professor and photographer Flora S. Kaplan, who corresponded with Alonge and visited Benin in 1982. Among the first visitors to the exhibit were members of Benin's royal court and Alonge's family. Attendees included his colleagues and friends, his children, and Prince Ademola Iyi-Eweka, grandson of the oba who served from 1914 to 1933. Also present were many subjects of Alonge's photographs, then in their late 70s and 80s. After the exhibition, scheduled to continue until January 2016, was finished, it was hoped that the exhibition will return to Benin, where it will continue to be displayed.
