= Jenevieve Aken =

Nigerian photographer

- Born: 1989 (age 36–37); Ikon Aluk, Cross River, Nigeria
- Occupation: Photographer
- Website: www.jenevieveaken.com

Jenevieve Aken (born 1989) is a Nigerian documentary, self-portrait and urban portrait photographer, focusing on cultural and social issues. Her work often revolves around her personal experiences and social issues surrounding gender roles. Aken also models in her self-portrait works. Her work has been shown at Lagos Photo Festival. Aken currently resides in Lagos, Nigeria.

== Biography ==
Aken grew up in the small village of Ikom Aluk in Cross River State. She suffered the death of her mother at a young age and was not aligned her father. He father was rather traditional and didn't want her to pursue career in music. Hence, they parted ways. She wrote songs inspired by her life experiences, one song being titled "Make It Through The Race." After her short stint in music she went on to try acting but soon put that aside as well. She eventually got her first break at the Vilsco Fashion Show and recognized the harsh realities of women in the modelling industry. It was her experiences in modeling that brought her to a career in photography.

She enrolled in the Market Photo workshop, Johannesburg, South Africa but was not able to complete the courses as she discovered opportunities in the British Council Model of the Year competition. She returned home to participate in the MTN Lagos Fashion & Design Week. While she stopped short of completing her photography classes, she told Pulse.ng "I will go back to complete my photography school. I know photography and modeling are both heavy tasks to undertake but I have passion for both and will do both concurrently for as long as I can," in an interview. Aken has seen success in photography regardless of finishing classes by participating in the Lagos Photo Festival.

== Photography series ==
=== Handy Hands ===
This photo series documents women in Berlin, Germany as they struggle to fit into "specified" roles of women in society. The images show a series of women pursuing careers that historically men have dominated. The women in the photos feel strongly about their career and are confident in the work they are doing regardless of the gender gap.

=== The Masked Women ===
This is a black and white, self-portrait series meant to depict women and their social roles in Nigerian culture. The images depict the peace and self-fulfilment of a woman without the stigmatized overarching views of women in a Nigerian culture. The images also explore how women can feel constrained by the stereotypes of what a "proper women" should act like in society. These photos are meant to exemplify women who have broken these stigmas but feel isolated by the norms of the society. In this series Aken hopes to inspire Nigerian women to practice their freedom regardless of external stereotypes.

=== Great Expectations ===
Inspired by Charles Dickens', Great Expectations, Akens created this series to illustrate the pressures on women, specifically African, to get married. Akens attempts to show how even the most successful women can feel unsuccessful until they are married due to social pressures.

=== Monankim ===
This photo series by Aken is based on a tradition ritual called Monankim that originates from the Bakor minority tribes. Monankim is a tradition in the Bakor culture that circumcises women and then celebrated as it is a symbol of entering womanhood. This tradition is seen as a right of passage and a woman is idolized after completing the process. This tradition is controversial as the process is dangerous and life-threatening. Aken documents the opposing views of Monankim by women in the society. While some see the process as exciting, others feel hesitant toward the idea.

=== Community and Courage ===
This photo series is set at a beach called Takwa Bay which is a popular place for refugees who swim and surf. Takwa Bay is known for allowing wide ranges of people to interact. The photos in this series depict how community and courage are both required in sports as the photos show children playing together regardless of societal background.

== Awards ==
- Wellcome Photography Prize (Hidden Worlds category) in 2017
- Model of the Year 2011, MTN/British Council
