= Akin Fakeye =

Nigerian artist (born 1936)

Akin Fakeye (né Akinlabi Fakeye; born 1936), is a Nigerian artist who works in the medium of wood carving.

== Biography ==
Fakeye was born in 1936 in Ila Orangun, Osun state, Nigeria. The Fakeye family is a multigenerational group of Yoruba sculptors. His father, Adewuyi Oguntunde Fakeye, was a master carver. As was tradition, Akin Fakeye was taught the art of carving by his father. Upon the death of his father, Akin went into apprenticeship under his brother Lamidi Fakeye from 1958–1967. He established himself in his own studio in 1968. Since that time, he has worked on a number of collaborations with his brother and has also trained twenty apprentices, including Ayo Bankole and his own sons, Jimoh Fakeye, Sulaiman Fakeye, Akeem Fakeye and Lukman Fakeye. All four of his sons are now professional carvers in their own right and have established their own studios.

Akin Fakeye was one of founding members of the Oyo State Woodcarver Association, which is an association set up to further the appreciation of quality woodcarving to a wider audience and also help develop a new generation of master carvers.

== Collections ==
Akin Fakeye works can be found in some private collections all over the world. He has the following exhibitions to his credit:

- Mansah Gallery, Banjul, Gambia;
- Osun Osogbo Annual Festival, Osun Osogbo;
- Africraft Art Agelery;
- Megamurth Impression Art Gallery;
- Aafak Art Gallery;
- Royal Nether Land Embassy – Abuja;
- Sheraton hotel & towers – Abuja;
- Ibadan art gallery;
- German cultural institute;
- African Studies Department University of Ibadan
