= Lukman Alade Fakeye =

Nigerian artist (born 1983)

- Born: Lukman; June 25 1983; Ibadan
- Citizenship: Nigeria
- Education: The Polytechnic, Ibadan
- Occupations: Wood Carver, Sculptor
- Predecessor: Lamidi Olonade Fakeye
- Father: Akin Fakeye

Lukman Alade Fakeye (born June 25, 1983, in Ibadan) is a Yoruba Nigerian sculptor and woodcarver.

== Background ==
The youngest in the Fakeye family of carvers, he is the nephew of Lamidi Olonade Fakeye, who carved the doors of the African Room at the Kennedy Center in Washington, D. C. Lukman began working with his father, Akin Fakeye, at the age of nine.

Lukman Alade Fakeye studied art and design at The Polytechnic, Ibadan, where he was elected Best Student in Sculpture twice. Fakeye's works can be seen in public and private collections in Nigeria, the United States, and the United Kingdom.

== Exhibitions ==
- The student art gallery at Ibadan Polytechnic
- Osun Oshogbo Annual Festival with Wale Adelakun, 2000, and with Akindele Olufemi Olunloyo, 2006
- Aafak Art Gallery, Lagos, Nigeria, with Awotunde Adeniyi, 2002
- Megamurth Impression Art Gallery with Seun Adeyemo
- Africraft Art Gallery with Rotimi Aderogba, 2005
- Dutch Embassy in Abuja, 2001
- Mansah Gallery, Banjul, The Gambia, 2007
