= Nengi Omuku =

Nigerian artist

- Born: Nengi Omuku; Born 1987; Delta State, Nigeria
- Education: Slade School of Fine Art, University College London
- Occupations: Artist, photographer
- Known for: Artist, sculpture
- Awards: British Council CHOGM art award
- Website: nengiomuku.com

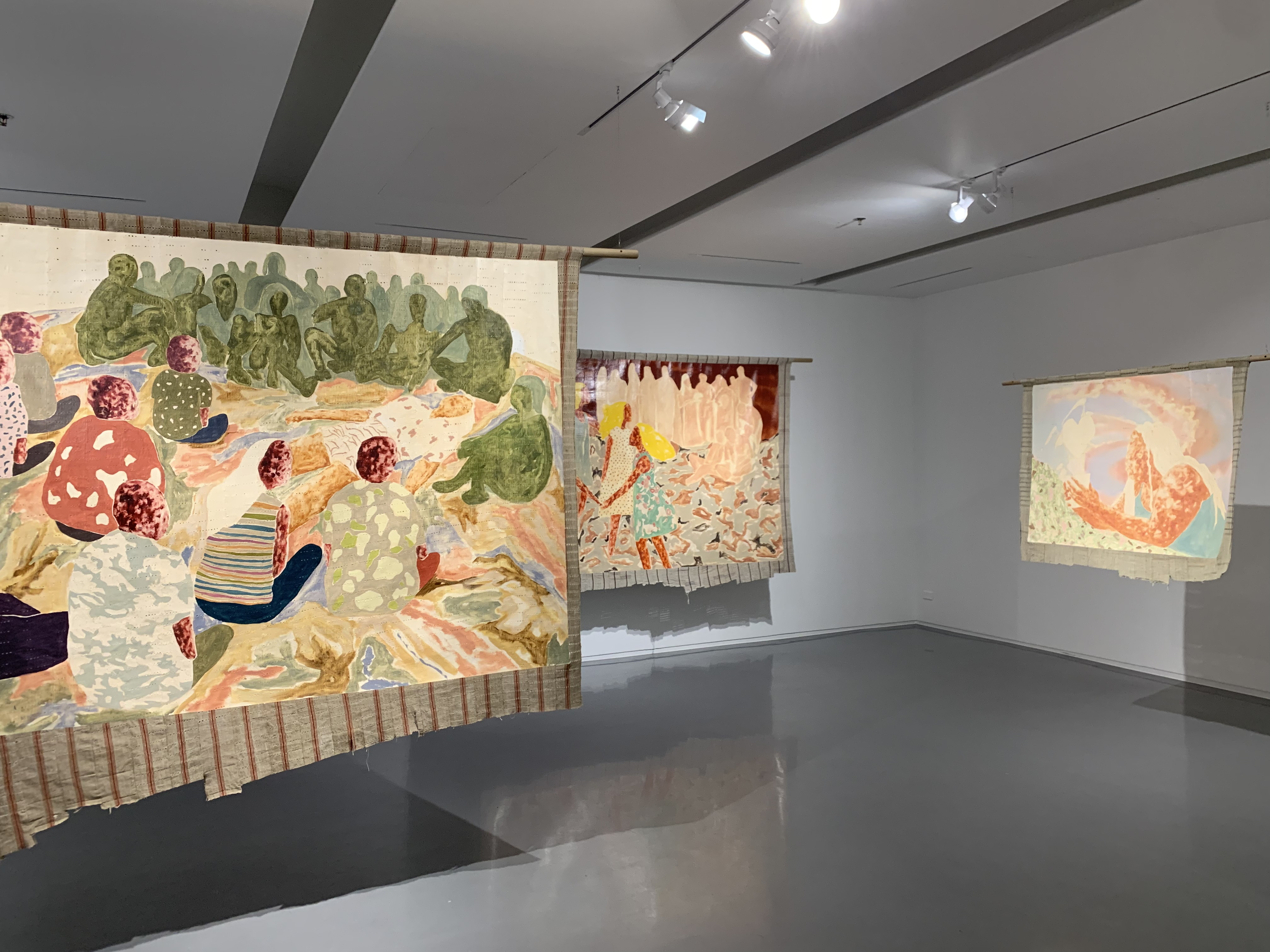
Various artworks by Omuku at the Bangkok Art Biennale, 2022

Nengi Omuku (born 1987) is a Nigerian creative artist, sculptor and painter.

== Early life and education ==
Born in Asaba, Delta State, Nigeria. Omuku studied both her B.A. and M.A in Fine art at the Slade School of Fine Art, University College London.

== Notable works ==
- I can't feel my legs, March 2012, oil on canvas, 220 x 160 cm.
- Botticelli, April 2012, oil on canvas, 100 x 140 cm.
- Corkscrew October 2014.
- Room with a view, 2020, oil on sanyan 130 x 190 cm
- What was lost, 2020, oil on sanyan 208 x 243 cm

== Awards ==
Nengi Omuku's artistic work has won her scholarships and awards, including the British Council CHOGM art award presented by Her majesty Queen Elizabeth II.

- 2012 Prankerd Jones Memorial Prize Awarded by University College London
- 2011 Nancy Balfour MA Scholarship Awarded by University College London
- 2003 Winner- British Council CHOGM art competition Awarded by Queen Elisabeth II

== Exhibitions ==
=== Solo exhibitions ===
- Kristin Hjellegjerde Gallery, Berlin (2021)
- Gathering, Kristin Hjellegjerde Gallery, London (2020)
- Stages of Collapse, September Gray, Atlanta (2017)
- A State of Mind, The Armory Show, New York (2016)
- A State of Mind, Omenka Gallery, Lagos (2015)
- To Figure an Encounter, Open The Gate, London (2011).

=== Group exhibitions ===
- La Galerie, Contemporary art Center, Noisy-le-Sec (2021)
- All the Days and Nights, Kristin Hjellegjerde Gallery, London (2020)
- Untitled Art San Francisco, with Kristin Hjellegjerde Gallery, San Francisco (2020)
- 1-54 Contemporary African Art Fair, London (2019), Hospital Rooms, Griffin Gallery, London (2018)
- At work, Arthouse, Lagos (2018); ARTX, Lagos (2017)
- Commotion, 1:54, London (2017); Mapping Histories, Constructing Realities, ART15, London (2015)
- The Next 50 Years, Omenka Gallery, Lagos (2014)
- Jerwood Drawing Prize Exhibition, Jerwood Gallery, London (2012).
- Deep Cuts Last Measures, Stephen Lawrence Gallery, London (2011)
- Surplus to Requirements, Slade Research Center, London (2011)
- The Future of Contemporary Art, Lloyd Gill Gallery, Bristol (2010)
- Group Exhibition, Swiss Cottage Gallery, London (2010)
- Group Exhibition, Camden Art Gallery, London (2009)

=== Commissions ===
- Arts Council England to paint a mural in an intensive care psychiatric ward in Maudsley hospital, London (2018)
- HSBC Art Collection,
- Beth Rudin DeWoody Collection
- Dawn Art Collection
