= Ade Adekola =

Nigerian artist (born 1966)

- Born: March 3, 1966 (age 60); Lomé, Nigeria
- Occupation: Multidisciplinary conceptual artist
- Known for: Photographer, painter, textile artist, writer, digital artist

Ade Adekola (born 1966), is a Nigerian multidisciplinary conceptual artist. He is known as a photographer, painter, textile artist, digital artist, and writer. He lives in Lagos.

== Early life and education ==
Ade Adekola was born on March 3, 1966, in Lomé, Nigeria. He graduated in 1992 with a degree in architecture from the Architectural Association School of Architecture in London and trained at the University of Manchester beforehand.
