= Jacob Afolabi =

Nigerian artist and printmaker

Jacob Afolabi (1944–2004) was a leading Nigerian artist and printmaker whose work is recognized as contributing to the post-independence Nigerian Modernism art movement.

== Early life and education ==
Jacob Afolabi was born in Ikirin, Nigeria. He was an actor in the theater troupe led by Duro Ladipo. In 1962, Ladipo co-founded the Mbari Mbayo Club in Osogbo with German art critic Ulli Beier. Afolabi attended the inaugural Mbari Mbayo workshop in 1962 led by Guyanese artist Denis Williams and subsequent sessions for the next several years. Afolabi's murals were used to decorate the Club's walls. Other notable artists who emerged from these workshops include Twins Seven-Seven and Jimoh Buriamoh.

According to Beier's assessment of Afolabi's early work, "The characteristics of Afolabi's style are bold, stirking forms and strong colors that are juxtaposed. It is a technique that could easily be reduced to mere poster art. Yet Afolabi's painting--for all its coolness--is sensitive and expressive." Another scholar described Afolabi as "one of the most talented artists to come out of the Osogbo workshops."

== Career ==
Subsequently, Afolabi's work were featured in the journal Black Orpheus published by the Mbari Club and in exhibits organized by the Club. As a result of his participation in these workshops, Afolabi's work was included in a traveling exhibit of African prints in the US organized by the Smithsonian. He served as long-time curator of the Mbari Mbayo arts center. Afolabi helped establish the Ife Design Workshop, Ile-Ife,1972 and illustrated several books including Oxford Books for primary schools in Nigeria.

Afolabi later held a position at the Institute of African Studies Museum at Obafemi Awolowo University, Osogbo.

Afolabi's work were featured in international exhibits such as:

- Contemporary African Art at Camden Arts Centre, London, 1969
- Contemporary African Art at Museum of African Art, Washington, DC, 1974
- Black Orpheus: Jacob Lawrence and the Mbari Club at Chrysler Museum of Art, Norfolk, Virginia, 2022
- Nigerian Modernism at the Tate, London, 2025
