= Muraina Oyelami =

Nigerian painter and performing artist (born 1940)

Eesa of Iragbiji Muraina Oyelami
- Born: 21 February 1940 (age 86); Iragbiji, Osun State, Nigeria
- Education: University of Ife
- Movement: Modernism, Osogbo Art

Chief Muraina Oyelami (born 21 February 1940) is a Nigerian painter and drummer of Yoruba descent. He was among the first generation of artists to come out of the Osogbo School of Art in the 1960s. He was a drummer and actor with the theatre company of Duro Ladipo. He taught traditional music and dance at Obafemi Awolowo University from 1976 to 1987. As a musician, he trained in the dùndún (talking drum) and the Batá drum. He was the chief of his hometown Iragbiji.

== Early life ==
Muraina Oyelami was born on 21 February 1940 in Iragbiji, Osun State.

== Drumming, theatre and arts ==
From 1963 to 1965, Oyelami undertook training in the dùndún (talking drum) from Oba Laoye, who was Timi of Ede. During the same time, he studied the Batá drum with Ayantunji Amoo of Okinni and Abeyefo of Iseyin. He was a drummer and actor with the Duro Ladipo National Theatre, the theatre company of Yoruba dramatist Duro Ladipo. He toured Europe as a member of the troupe, first to Germany for the Berlin Festival of Art in 1964 and then to the United Kingdom for the Commonwealth Arts Festival in 1965.

"Georgina never told us what to paint; she just gave us materials and we didn't know what she was looking for. But we loved doing it...We never saw so much paint, so much color...The art workshop was a wonderful experience, because it taught us to see our own potential. I think that I can say that Bisi Fabunmu, Rufus, Twins Seven-Seven and myself, each discovered a new dimension in ourselves...Making a painting is really like going into a strange place, like an unknown territory and then you have nothing but your own integrity to guide you...The importance of the art workshop to us was that it gave us a sense of our own identity."

— Muraina Oyelami

In 1964, Oyelami attended the summer art school of the Mbari Mbayo Artists and Writers Club in Osogbo where he attended a painting workshop given by Georgina Beier. He began studying at the Osogbo Art School, founded by Georgina and Ulli Beier, and was among the first generation of Osogbo Art students; at the school he took printmaking and painting workshops in addition to working as a stage actor and master Yoruba drummer.

In his visual art, Oyelami drew inspiration from the works of Kenyan printmaker Hezbon Owiti. At his first exhibition in Edinburgh in 1967 his works were compared to those of Paul Klee and Amedeo Modigliani, though he was unfamiliar with European art. He was later compared to Georges Rouault and attended the printmaking workshops of Ru Van Rossem in 1966 and 1972.

Oyelami attended the University of Ife (now Obafemi Awolowo University) in Ile-Ife, studying technical theatre with a specialisation in theatre design and received a certificate in dramatic arts. In 1973 he traveled to the New York where he had a fellowship and residency at the National Black Theatre in Harlem. Oyelami taught traditional music and dance at Obafemi Awolowo University from 1976 to 1987. He was also a visiting professor at the University of Bayreuth, Germany. Oyelami was also commissioned to create mosaics for Obafemi Awolowo University. His first pair of mosaics, on the Faculty of Health Science building in Ile-Ife, were completed in 1975. He completed a mosaic mural on the Iragbiji campus at Wema Bank Plc. in 1983.

Oyelami plays both traditional and fusion music and was a featured artist on the German band Embryo's 1985 album Embryo & Yoruba Dun Dun Orchester. He was the musical director for and composed the score to the 1998 Royal Exchange Theatre production of the Wole Soyinka play Death and the King's Horseman.

Oyelami is chief of his village, having been made Eesa of Iragbiji on 14 February 1993.

In 2018, Oyelami founded the Abeni Visual and Performing Art Institute in Iragbiji. He serves as artistic director of the school. The institute trains students in visual and performing arts, including drum making, textile design and printmaking.

== Painting ==
As a first-generation member of the Osogbo Art School, Oyelami is considered part of the Osogbo Art movement. His style is considered Modernist, with his oil paintings displaying a direct sense of design, and a juxtaposition of subtle muted colours with strong lines. Oyelami's themes are influenced by Yoruba culture, and the subject matter of his landscapes and portraits are often derived from daily life and individuals. Oyelami's early oil paintings involved abstract representations of life in the city, while by the 1980s his work had become more figurative, trending towards more generic themes.

Oyelami has participated in dozens of solo and group exhibitions. His works are included in a number of collections. His 1971 painting Birds in the Garden is part of the collection of the Smithsonian Institution's National Museum of African Art in Washington, D.C. Oyelami's 1971 painting Village on the Hillside is in the Tyler Collection of Romanian and Modern Art at the University of Tasmania. His works are also in the collections of the National Gallery of Modern Art in Lagos, the Studio Museum in Harlem, at the Lagos State House of Assembly, the private collection of Bola Ige, the Institute of Contemporary Arts in London, and the Staatlichen Kunsthalle in Berlin.

Oyelami's works accompanied those from the collection of Susanne Wenger in a 2016 exhibition that served as a tribute to her life. In 2017, his works were shown at an exhibition of Osogbo art in the United States and at Art Dubai.

== Publications ==
Oyelami has written books on drumming and Yoruba culture. The 1993 monograph Abefe: An Autobiography of Muraina Oyelami was based on interviews of Oyelami, edited by Ulli Beier. In the text, Oyelami describes his youth, theatre in Ile-Ife, the Mbari-Mbayo workshop, and his residencies at Iwalewa-Haus.

- Oyelami, Muraina (1982). My Life in the Duro Lapido Theatre. [Bayreuth]: Iwalewa-Haus. OCLC 16528068.
- Oyelami, Muraina (1989). Yoruba Dundun Music: A New Notation with Basic Exercises & Five Yoruba Drum Repertoires. Iwalewa. OCLC 24257917.
- Oyelami, Muraina (1993). Ulli Beier (ed.). Abefe: An Autobiography of Muraina Oyelami. Bayreuth: Iwalewa-Haus, University of Bayreuth. OCLC 5827185.
