= Lanre =

- Language: Yoruba

Origin
- Origin: Nigeria
- Region of origin: Southwestern Nigeria

Lanre is a Nigerian given name of Yoruba origin that is derived from Ọlánrewájú, which means “Wealth/nobility is progressing”.

== Notable people bearing the name ==
- ELDee (born Lanre Dabiri in 1977), Nigerian rapper
- Rilwan Lanre Babalola, Nigerian minister
- Lanre Buraimoh, Nigerian-born artist
- Lanre Fehintola, British photojournalist
- Lanre Hassan (born 1950), Nigerian film actress
- Lanre Kehinde (born 1994), Nigerian football player
- Lanre Oyebanjo (born 1990), British football player
- Adeola Lanre Runsewe (born 1989), Nigerian football midfielder
- Lanre Tejuosho (born 1964), Nigerian senator
- Lanre Towry-Coker (born 1944), Nigerian architect, politician and socialite
