= Buraimoh =

- Gender: Male
- Language: Yoruba

Origin
- Origin: Nigerian
- Meaning: 'father of many'
- Region of origin: South West, Nigeria

Other names
- Variant form: Ibrahim

Buraimoh is a Nigerian male given name and surname predominantly used among Muslims, particularly within the Yoruba community. Derived from Arabic Ibrahim (i.e. Abraham), the name which signifies 'father of many' or 'father of a multitude', symbolizing abundance, strength, and lineage.

== Notable individuals with the name ==
- Adeniji Adele (1893 – 1964), Nigerian king. Oba of Lagos.
- Lanre Buraimoh (born 1976), Nigerian-born artist.
- Jimoh Buraimoh (born 1943), Nigerian painter and artist, father of Lanre.

== See also ==
- Braimoh
