= Bakare Gbadamosi =

Nigerian poet and author

Bakare Gbadamosi (born 1930) is a Yoruba poet, anthropologist and short story writer from Nigeria.

== Life ==
Born in Osogbo, Hammed Gbadamosi wrote his own Yoruba poetry and short stories in the early 1960s. However, he is best known for collecting and translating Yoruba folk tales and traditional poetry in collaboration with Ulli Beier. Much of Gbadamosi's work was published by Mbari, a club founded by Beier in Ibadan. In the late 1960s Gbadamosi was working as an ethnographer for the Nigerian Museum in Lagos, having previously worked "as a letter writer, stage magician and actor". He participated in Duro Ladipo's theatre group in Osogbo. According to one source, Gbadamosi later became known as Demola Onibonokuta.

== Works ==
=== In Yoruba ===
- Oriki, Ibadan: Mbari Publications, 1961. (Poems.)
- Ọrọ pẹlu idi rẹ, Oshogbo: Mbari Mbayo Publications, 1965. (Stories.)

=== In English ===
- (coll. and tr. with Ulli Beier) Yoruba Poetry: traditional Yoruba poems. Ibadan: Ministry of Education, 1959. Special publication of Black Orpheus. With silkscreen prints and vignettes by Susanne Wenger.
- (coll. and tr. with Ulli Beier) The Moon Cannot Fight: Yoruba children's poems, Ibadan: Mbari Publications, [1960s?]. Illustrations by Georgina Betts.
- (coll. and tr. with Ulli Beier) Ijala: animal songs by Yoruba hunters. Port Moresby, 1967.
- (coll. and tr. with Ulli Beier) Not Even God Is Ripe Enough: Yoruba stories, London & Ibadan: Heinemann Educational, 1968. African Writers Series 48.
