= Papua New Guinean literature =

Papua New Guinean literature is diverse. The emergence of written literature (as distinct from oral literature) is comparatively recent in Papua New Guinea. It was given its first major stimulus with the setting up of creative writing courses by Ulli Beier at the University of Papua New Guinea (established in 1966). Beier also founded a Papua Pocket Poets series, as well as the literary magazine Kovave, the first of its kind in the country. Some of Papua New Guinea's first noted writers, including John Kasaipwalova, Kumalau Tawali, Apisai Enos and Kama Kerpi, were first published in Kovave.

One of the earliest forums for English-language writing by Papua New Guineans was The Papuan Villager, a monthly newspaper established by Australian government anthropologist F. E. Williams in 1929 which actively sought contributions from around the territory of Papua.

In 1932, the country's first Methodist Priest, Hosea Linge, known as "Ligeremaluoga", published an autobiography that was translated as The Erstwhile Savage. In 1968, Albert Maori Kiki’s autobiography Ten Thousand Years in a Lifetime was the first major work of Papua New Guinean literature published outside a magazine. In 1970, Vincent Eri published the first Papua New Guinean novel, The Crocodile.

Notable Papua New Guinean writers also include Russell Soaba, Ignatius Kilage, Nora Vagi Brash, Steven Edmund Winduo, and Loujaya Kouza.

== Sources ==
- "English in the South Pacific", John Lynch and France Mugler, University of the South Pacific
