= Colette Omogbai =

Nigerian artist and printmaker

Colette Omogbai (born 1943) is a pioneering Nigerian artist and printmaker of the 20th century and one of the few noted female artists of the Nigerian modernist art movement.

== Early life and education ==
Colette Omogbai was born near Benin City, Nigeria. She attended the Nigerian College of Arts, Science, and Technology (now Ahmadu Bello University) at Zaria and graduated in 1964. Though not a member of the Zaria Art Society, she followed its precepts of natural synthesis, which drew on Nigerian heritage and modern techniques and adopted Surrealist approaches. Later, she undertook postgraduate study at the Slade School of Fine Art in London.

== Career ==
Omogbai made her initial entrance into modern Nigeria's art scene with a striking solo exhibition of paintings in 1963 at the Mbari Mbayo Club in Ibadan, Nigeria. Her paintings were later published in the Mbari literary journal Black Orpheus (February 1964). In a review of another of her exhibits soon thereafter at the Exhibition Centre in Lagos, Babatunde Lawal in Nigeria magazine described her as "lacking a feminine touch". She responded in a controversial essay in the same publication in 1965, "Man Loves What Is Sweet and Obvious", by "boldly critiquing the patriarchal dynamic of the older modern artists who insisted that children must wait their turn." According to African art scholar Chika Okeke-Agulu, Omogbai's essay was reflective of a turning point in the country's art history, marking "the moment when the genie of postcolonial modernism had escaped from the proverbial lamp and taken flight, ready to confront the past and present in its own voice, poised to assert its claims to the driving seat of Nigerian art."

In landmark survey book Contemporary Art in Africa (1968), art critic and co-founder of Mbari Ulli Beier described Omogbai (one of few women artists included) as having "a vigorous style of her own. Her themes are abstractions on grief, agony, re-creation, curse and accident. Her manner is expressionist. . . Her colours are intense. . . The overall impression is sombre and intense. Her application of paint is always interesting, her surfaces alive."

In describing Omogbai's works a decade later, Associate Curator at the Museum of Modern Art Howardena Pindell wrote that "She creates bold, expressive compositions by making use of stark, intense black, red, and blue shapes surrounded often by white bare canvas. Her woodcuts might have bold, incised lines allowing the white of the paper to show through." Another scholar called her work "a visual poetry of a searing sort".

Omogbai was among the small group of Nigerian women artists of the period, such as Afi Ekong, Etso Clara Ugbodaga-Ngu, and Ladi Kwali, who gained national and international attention for their works and are experiencing a resurgence of critical attention today. Curator of the 2024 Nigeria Pavilion at the Venice Biennale Aindrea Emelife said in an interview that she would have wished to have included Omogbai because: "I feel her work would contribute further to the already established focus on Nigerian woman artists, but also to the resistance of conformity. It is important that a ‘national style’ is resisted and Omogbai, it seemed, may agree."

In 1976, Omogbai obtained a doctorate degree in art education from New York University. She returned to Nigeria in the same year and joined the Nigerian civil service as an art teacher and administrator. She reportedly ceased her artmaking to be a full-time civil servant and administrator.

The whereabouts today of most of her work is unknown, but her painting Agony (1963) has been part of several exhibits, including:

- Neue Kunst in Afrika (New Art in Africa), Mainz, Germany, June 1980; Bayreuth, Germany, July–August 1980; Wörgl, Austria, September 1980
- Postwar: Art Between the Pacific and the Atlantic,1945–1965, Haus der Kunst, Munich, October 2016 to March 2017
- Niepodległe: Women, Independence and National Discourse, Muzeum, Museum of Modern Art in Warsaw, 2018-2019
- Into the Night: Cabarets & Clubs in Modern Art, Barbican Art Gallery, London, 2019–2020
- Black Orpheus: Jacob Lawrence and the Mbari Club at Chrysler Museum of Art, Norfolk, Virginia, 2022
- Project a Black Planet: The Art and Culture of Panafrica, The Art Institute of Chicago, 2024

== Personal life ==
Omogbai married Prince Emmanuel Eberechukwu Onyeka in 1969. She eventually relocated to the United States.
