= Denis Williams =

Guyanese painter, writer and archaeologist (1923–1998)

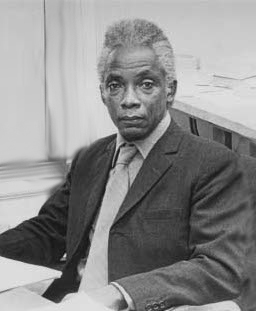
- Born: Denis Joseph Ivan Williams; 1 February 1923; Georgetown, British Guiana
- Died: 28 June 1998 (aged 75); Georgetown, Guyana
- Education: Camberwell School of Art
- Occupations: Author, painter, archaeologist

Denis Williams (1 February 1923 – 28 June 1998) was a Guyanese painter, author and archaeologist.

== Biography ==
Dr. Denis Joseph Ivan Williams, C.C.H., Hon. D. Lit., M.A., called by his friends "Sonny" Williams, was born on 1 February 1923 in Georgetown, Guyana (formerly British Guiana), where he received his early education; he was granted a Cambridge Junior School Certificate in 1940 and a Cambridge Senior School Certificate in 1941. His promise as a painter won him a two-year British Council Scholarship to the Camberwell School of Art in London in 1946. He lived in London for the next 10 years, during which he taught fine art as a lecturer at the Central School of Art and visiting tutor at the Slade School of Art. He also held several one-man shows of his work, and produced the artwork for Bajan novelist George Lamming's first book In the Castle of my Skin. From 1957 to 1962 he lectured on fine art at Khartoum Technical Institute.

Williams was involved in leading the workshops at the Mbari Mbayo Club in Osogbo, Nigeria, in the early 1960s from which noted Nigerian artists such as Jacob Afolabi and Twins Seven Seven emerged. He later became a researcher at the Institute of African Studies at the University of Ife.

He recognised the importance of publication and in 1978 founded Archaeology and Anthropology, the journal of the Walter Roth Museum of Anthropology in Georgetown. Among other journals Williams edited were Odu (the University of Ife Journal of African studies) and Lagos Notes and Records, and he contributed numerous essays on art to books and journals. He wrote two novels and numerous short stories.

In 1986, Williams and his assistant, Jennifer Wishart, initiated a programme for junior archaeologists in Guyanese secondary schools.

Williams died from cancer, aged 75, on 28 June 1998 at his home in Georgetown.

The Art of Denis Williams, a book by his daughter Evelyn A. Williams about his life and work, was published in 2012.

== Awards and recognition ==
His accomplishments were recognised in several national awards, including the Golden Arrow of Achievement Award from the government of Guyana in 1973, and the Cacique Crown of Honour in 1989, the same year that he received an honorary doctorate from the University of the West Indies.

== Selected works ==
=== Fiction ===
- Other Leopards. London: New Authors Ltd, 1963. Reprinted Peepal Tree Press, 2009.
- The Third Temptation. London: Calder and Boyars, 1968. Reprinted Peepal Tree Press, 2010.

=== Non-fiction ===
- Image and Idea in the Arts of Guyana (1969)
- Giglioli in Guyana, 1922–1972 (1973)
- Icon and Image: A Study of Sacred and Secular Forms of African Classical Art (1974)
- Contemporary Art in Guyana (1976)
- Guyana, Colonial Art to Revolutionary Art, 1966–1976
- Habitat and Culture in Ancient Guyana (1984)
- Pages in Guyanese Prehistory (1995)
- Prehistoric Guyana (2003)
