= Pan African Pocket Poets =

Series of poetry chapbooks (1971-72)

- Pan African Pocket Poets colophon, presumably designed by Georgina Beier.
- Founded: 1971; 55 years ago
- Founder: Ulli Beier
- Country of origin: Nigeria

Pan African Pocket Poets (PPP) was a series of 5 chapbooks published by Ulli Beier in Ife, Nigeria between 1971 and 1972. They feature works by 4 Nigerian poets, as well as John Kasaipwalova, from Papua New Guinea. The Nigerian Civil War is a common theme throughout the collection.

== Background ==
Beier lived in Nigeria between 1950 and 1966, during which time he began various publishing enterprises including Odu: A Journal of Yoruba Studies (1954), Black Orpheus: A Journal of African and Afro-American Literature (1957) and The Mbari Club (1961).

In 1971, he was invited back to Nigeria to take up the post of Research Professor and Director of the Institute of African Studies, University of Ife, Ile-Ife (now Obafemi Awolowo University). Beier remained in post for three years, during which time he published the Pan African Pocket Poets series. The covers of each book were designed by his wife, Georgina Beier.

Beier's influence on the development of Nigerian literature is significant, but his legacy is marred by literary hoaxes and cultural appropriation.

Pan African Pocket Poets

Reluctant Flame

Voyage

Dusts of Exhile

Golgotha

Cover of who has blood?

== Reluctant Flame by John Kasaipwalova (1971) ==
The first volume in the series was provided by John Kasaipwalova. Kasaipwalova was a writer from Papua New Guinea, where Beier had been based from 1967 until 1971. The title appeared in both the Pan African Pocket Poets and Beier's Papua Pocket Poets series.

Described as a ‘Ginsbergish’ poem, Reluctant Flame imagines anti-colonial revolution as an erupting volcano and is regarded as the most overtly political composition published by Beier at the time.

== Voyage and other poems by Onwuchekwa Jemie (1971) ==
The second volume featured a collection of poems by Onwuchekwa Jemie, a writer from Nigeria. The title poem had previously appeared in Présence Africaine. Included was a long poem ‘Biafra: Requiem for the Dead in War’ that confidently predicts success in the Nigerian Civil War.

== Dusts of Exile by Okogbule Wonodi (1971) ==
The third volume was authored by Okogbule Wonodi, formerly known as Glory Okogbule Nwanodi. This was Wonodi's second collection of poems, and includes works that deal with social problems that emerged during the Nigerian civil war.

== Golgotha by Pol Ndu (1971) ==
The fourth volume is by Pol Nnamuzikam Ndu, an Igbo poet originally from Ihiala. At the time of publication, Ndu was studying for a PhD in Afro-American literature at the State University of New York, Buffalo, having been awarded an Aggrey Fellowship. In 1976, he returned to Nigeria, but was killed in a car crash later that year.

Included within the 18 poems are ‘Golgotha’ and ‘Golgotha Revisited’, which were later retitled respectively as ‘July 1966’ and ‘Biafra Revisited’ in the author's collection Songs for Seers (New York: Nok, 1974).

== Who has Blood? by Oyeleke Fowowe (1972) ==
The series concludes with Oyeleke Fowowe's Who has blood? The collection is described as being riddled with the imagery of death. Like the previous collections in the series, Fowowe writes about the Nigerian civil war, but also laments others who have died in other circumstances.

== Sources ==
- Abiodun, Rowland (2011). "The Elephant Lies Down Like a Hill: Tribute to Ulli Beier 1922-2011". African Arts. 44 (4): 4–7. doi:10.1162/afar.2011.44.4.4. JSTOR 41330737. S2CID 57570596.
- Aiyejina, Funso (2005). "Ndu, Pol Nnamuzikam (1940-76)". In Benson, Eugene; Conolly, L.W. (eds.). Encyclopedia of Post-Colonial Literatures in English. Routledge. ProQuest 2137908115.
- Chappell, David (2005). ""Africanization" in the Pacific: Blaming Others for Disorder in the Periphery?". Comparative Studies in Society and History. 47 (2): 286–317. doi:10.1017/S0010417505000149. JSTOR 3879306. S2CID 145142672.
- Egudu, Romanus N. (1986). "Christopher Okigbo and the Growth of Poetry". In Gérard, Albert S. (ed.). European-language Writing in Sub-Saharan Africa (volume 2). Budapest: Akadémiai Kiadó. ISBN 963-05-3834-2.
- Feuser, Willfried F. (1975). "A Farewell to the Rising Sun: Post-Civil War Writings from Eastern Nigeria". Books Abroad. 49 (1): 40–49. doi:10.2307/40128936. JSTOR 40128936.
- Jemie, Onwuchekwa (1970). "Voyage". Présence Africaine. 74 (74): 156–165. JSTOR 24350172.
- Lindfors, Bernth (1973). "Reviewed Work(s): Who Has Blood? by Oyeleke Fowowe". Books Abroad. 47 (3): 604. doi:10.2307/40127515. JSTOR 40127515.
- Long, Maebh (2023). "Being Obotunde Ijimere and M. Lovori: Mapping Ulli Beier's intercultural hoaxes from Nigeria to Papua New Guinea". The Journal of Commonwealth Literature. 58 (2): 293–307. doi:10.1177/0021989420962829. S2CID 225135311.
- McLuckie, Craig W. (1987). "A Preliminary Checklist of Primary and Secondary Sources on Nigerian Civil War / Biafran War Literature". Research in African Literatures. 18 (4): 510–527. JSTOR 3819553.
- Tiffin, Chris (2005). "South Pacific". In Benson, Eugene; Conolly, L.W. (eds.). Encyclopedia of Post-Colonial Literatures in English. Routledge. ProQuest 2137915095.
