= Caravan of Dreams =

Performing arts center

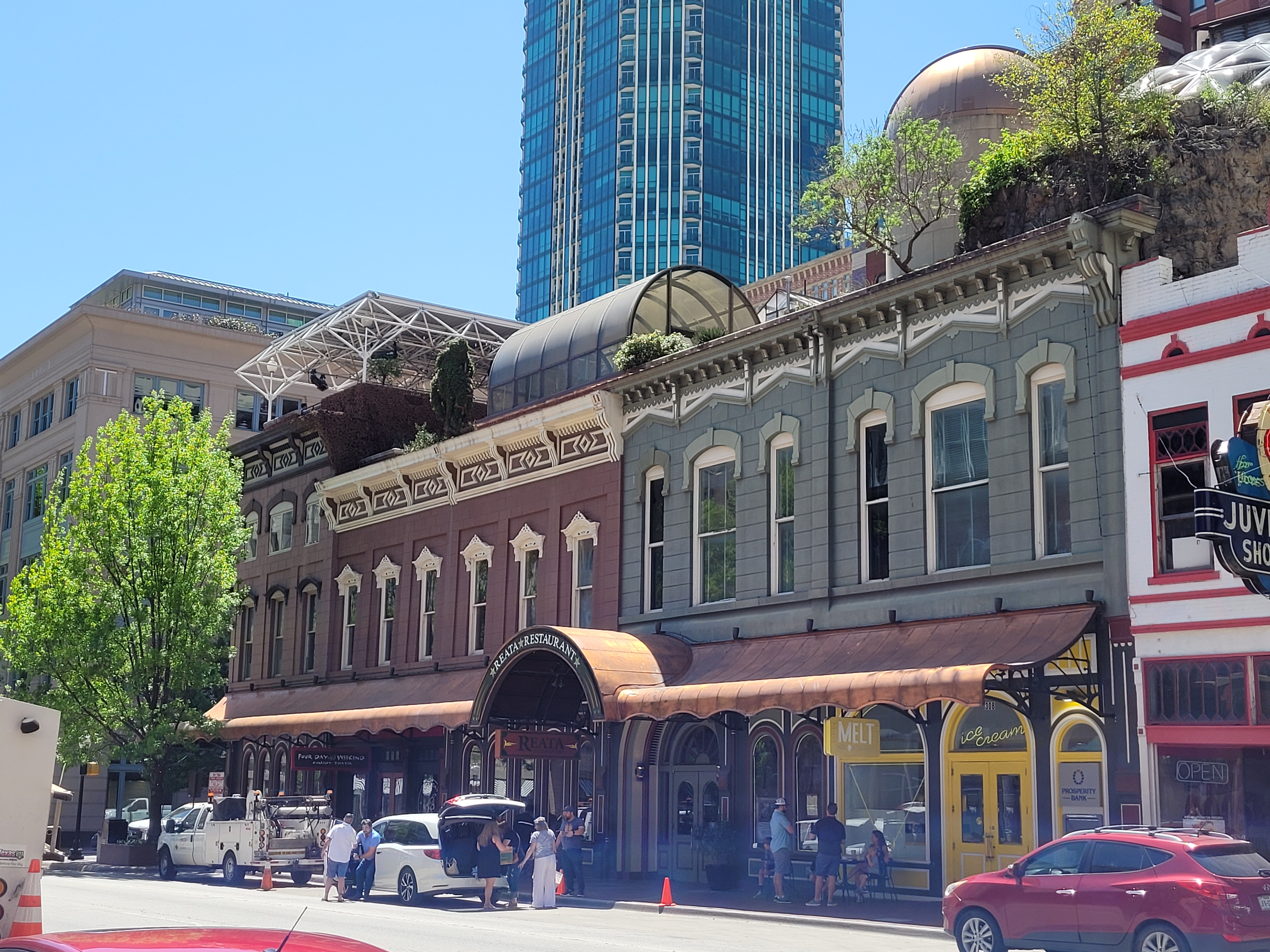
- Former location of Caravan of Dreams, as of April 2021
- Interactive map of Caravan of Dreams
- Address: 312 Houston Street
- Location: Fort Worth, Texas
- Coordinates: 32.754893°N 97.332763°W
- Capacity: 212 (theater)
- Type: Performing arts center
- Events: Jazz, spoken word, theater

Construction
- Opened: September 1983
- Closed: September 29, 2001

Caravan of Dreams was a performing arts center in the central business district of Fort Worth, Texas during the 1980s and 1990s. The venue was best known locally as a live music nightclub, though this was only one part of a larger facility. The center also included a multitrack recording studio, a 212-seat theater, two dance studios, and a rooftop garden. The center was at 312 Houston Street, and prefigured the redevelopment of Sundance Square into a dining and entertainment district. Billionaire oil heir Ed Bass, whose family has participated in much of the redevelopment of downtown Fort Worth, financed the project, and Kathelin Hoffman served as its artistic director. The facility consisted of new construction behind two facades from the 1880s.

== History ==
Caravan of Dreams was self-described as "...a meeting place appealing to audiences who enjoy the creation of new forms of music, theater, dance, poetry and film," designed and managed by and for artists. The name was taken from 1001 Arabian Nights, by way of Brion Gysin, who attended the opening of the venue with William S. Burroughs in 1983. The opening celebration centered around performances by Fort Worth native Ornette Coleman, both with his Prime Time ensemble in the nightclub, and with the Fort Worth Symphony at the nearby Convention Center. The event coincided with the mayoral proclamation of September 29, 1983 as "Ornette Coleman Day," when Coleman was presented with a key to the city.

Caravan of Dreams hosted many musical acts in its time, including David Sanborn and Nancy Wilson, among many others.

Caravan of Dreams Productions
- Founded: 1983
- Founder: Kathelin Hoffman
- Defunct: c. 1990
- Status: Defunct
- Country of origin: United States
- Location: Fort Worth, Texas

The center operated its own record label, releasing albums by Coleman as well as artists such as Ronald Shannon Jackson, James Blood Ulmer, and Twins Seven Seven. Caravan of Dreams also released films (including Ornette: Made in America, a feature-length documentary about Coleman) and spoken word recordings by William S. Burroughs, Brion Gysin, John P. Allen (as Johnny Dolphin), and others. The label was active for about five years.

Caravan of Dreams attempted joint projects with international artists. In his book "Ingilizce Bilmeden Hepinizi I Love You!", Ferhan Sensoy (a prolific Turkish playwright, actor, and author) details his encounters with the artists, the management and the funders of the Caravan of Dreams during his trip to Fort Worth to discuss a possible joint project. It is likely the unnamed person he refers to in his book as the "Lady from Texas" is Kathelin Hoffman.

The rooftop garden featured hundreds of cacti and succulent plants, as well as a glass geodesic dome. Several years later, Biosphere 2 would incorporate geodesic domes in its structure, with the involvement of some of the same individuals behind Caravan of Dreams.

The facility became less geared toward the experimental (though high-profile) musicians, writers, and artists with whom it was associated in its early days, when Jerry Thompson, a veteran of the Dallas Alley nightclub district, was hired as Caravan's president. Caravan of Dreams ceased its production of entertainment media, and the nightclub hosted more mainstream performers outside of the jazz genre.

Frequent headliners Acoustic Alchemy named a track on their fourth album, Reference Point, after the venue.

Peter White's 1996 album and title track were named after the venue.

The nightclub closed in 2001 (with Brave Combo as the closing night act), exactly eighteen years after Ornette Coleman Day, and was converted into a restaurant, Reata at Sundance Square. Four Day Weekend, a comedy troupe, began performing in the theater before the nightclub closed, and continued operating the space as Four Day Weekend Theater.

== Discography ==
Catalog number	Artist	Title
CDP 85001	Ornette Coleman and Prime Time	Opening the Caravan of Dreams
CDP 85002	Ornette Coleman	Prime Design/Time Design
CDP 85004	James Blood Ulmer	Live at the Caravan of Dreams
CDP 85005	Ronald Shannon Jackson with Twins Seven Seven	Live at the Caravan of Dreams
CDP 85007	Twins Seven Seven	Slang in Trance
CDP 85008	Ornette Coleman Quartet & Prime Time	In All Languages
CDP 85009 (or Dreams 009)	Ronald Shannon Jackson and the Decoding Society	When Colors Play
CDP 85010	Eartha Kitt	My Way
CDP 85011	William S. Burroughs	Uncommon Quotes
CDP 85012	Ronald Shannon Jackson	Texas
CDP 85013	Johnny Dolphin	Uncommon Quotes: The Dream & Drink of Freedom
CDP 85014	Timothy Leary	Uncommon Quotes

== See also ==
- List of jazz clubs
- List of record labels
