= Timothy Akis =

Papua New Guinean artist (born 1944)

Timothy Akis, born around 1944 in Tsembaga village, Simbai Valley, Madang Province, Papua New Guinea, died in 1984, was a Papua New Guinean artist. His art consisted primarily in imaginative pen and ink drawings and batiks inspired by his country's wildlife.

Akis had the distinction of being the second Papua New Guinean artist to hold an exhibition, at the University of Papua New Guinea in 1969. He later held exhibitions in the United States, the United Kingdom, Switzerland, the Philippines and Australia.

Ulli Beier described Akis' artwork from his first exhibition in these terms:

"The delicate freshness of these drawings owes nothing to the traditions of his people, whose artwork consisted mainly of geometric shield designs. Unburdened by the rigid conventions of ancient traditions and uninhibited by western education, Akis created his personal image of a world of animals and men."

Examples of Akis' artwork were reproduced in the inaugural issue of Beier' Kovave: A Journal of New Guinea literature, alongside the work of fellow artists such as Mathias Kauage. Kauage's own art was reportedly inspired by visiting Akis' exhibition.

In the 1970s and early 1980s, Akis divided his time between subsistence farming in his native village and working on his art in Port Moresby.

During a posthumous exhibition, the Tamworth Regional Gallery (Australia) identified Akis as one of Papua New Guinea's leading print and drawing artists, along with Mathias Kauage, John Man and Martin Morububuna. Akis' art was also exhibited posthumously at the Musée des Confluences in Lyon in 2007. An exhibition in Cairns that same year celebrated Akis' "international reputation", along with that of other notable Papua New Guinean artists, and his art was also displayed at the Alcheringa Gallery in 2007. In 2008, his work featured alongside that of Kuagae and Morububuna an exhibition in Clarence Valley, then alongside that of Jakupa Ako and Mathias Kauage at the East-West Center Gallery. The ninth issue of the Australian Art Review described Beier's "mentorship" relationship with Akis. Akis' art has been featured in the book La peinture des Papous, along with that of Mathias Kauage, Jakupa Ako and John Siune.

The Star Bulletin described Akis as having had "a major influence on the nation's art as [he] demonstrated how indigenous culture could be reflected in contemporary art forms."

== Examples of Akis' artwork ==
- Untitled, stencil, 1974; National Gallery of Australia
- Bilak bokis (Flying fox), stencil, 1977; National Gallery of Australia
- Untitled, 1985; Alcheringa Gallery
