= Live at the Caravan of Dreams (Ronald Shannon Jackson album) =

Live album by Ronald Shannon Jackson with Twins Seven Seven
- Released: 1986
- Recorded: 1985
- Venue: Caravan of Dreams, Fort Worth, Texas
- Genre: Free jazz
- Length: 39:07
- Label: Caravan of Dreams Productions; CDP 85005
- Producer: Kathelin Hoffman

Ronald Shannon Jackson chronology
Decode Yourself (1985)	Live at the Caravan of Dreams (1986)	When Colors Play (1986)

Beast in the Spider Bush cover

Live at the Caravan of Dreams is an album by Ronald Shannon Jackson and The Decoding Society with Twins Seven Seven, recorded in 1985 at the Caravan of Dreams in Fort Worth, Texas, and released on the Caravan of Dreams label. The album was rereleased on CD in 1999 on Knit Classics as Beast in the Spider Bush: Live at the Caravan of Dreams.

== Reception ==
Professional ratings
Review scores
Source	Rating
AllMusic	4/5 stars
Robert Christgau	B+
The Encyclopedia of Popular Music	3/5 stars
The Penguin Guide to Jazz Recordings	2.5/4 stars
The Rolling Stone Album Guide	3/5 stars

The AllMusic review by Thom Jurek stated: "The trademark harmolodic melody lines are present, but in the way of real group interplay and improvisation, there is little heat. Twins Seven Seven is a fantastic singing and drumming group; it would be a treat to hear them in some setting other than this one. As for the Decoding Society, it's clear that this was the beginning of the end creatively."

== Track listing ==
All compositions by Ronald Shannon Jackson.

1. "The Ancient Voice of "E"" – 9:45
2. "Dream Caravan" – 8:54 [titled African Seance" on reissue]
3. "Ire (Eray)" – 9:04
4. "Boiling Cabbage" – 11:18

== Personnel ==
- Ronald Shannon Jackson – drums
- Eric Person – alto saxophone, soprano saxophone
- Akbar Ali – violin, barriphone
- Cary Denigris – guitar
- Reginal Washington – electric bass
- Twins Seven Seven – vocals, percussion, talking drum
