= Movin' Right Along =

Movin' Right Along or Moving Right Along may refer to:

- "Movin' Right Along" (song), a song from The Muppet Movie
- Movin' Right Along (album), a 1960 studio album by Arnett Cobb
- Moving Right Along, a 1993 studio album by World Saxophone Quartet
