= Ọba kò so =

Ọba kò so (The King Did Not Hang) is a play by Duro Ladipo depicting the mystical and ambivalent personality known as Shango of Yoruba mythology.

== Historical and Cultural Significance ==
Duro Ladipo's revolutionary play, Oba Kò So, was first staged in 1963 at the Mbari Mayo Club in Osogbo, Nigeria, as part of an anniversary celebration for the opening of the city's arts centre, notably the same year that Nigeria was declared a republic. Not only did Oba Kò So gain national recognition, but it gained international recognition, as the German Cultural Center in Lagos staged it in 1963, prompting its appearance in a cultural festival in Berlin called the Berliner Festwochen in 1964. The reviews of the Berlin audience highly revered its performance, describing it as one of the "great highlights of the festival". Ladipo's company was then invited to perform Oba Kò So for the Commonwealth Tour throughout Europe starting in 1965 and continued to perform throughout Europe in addition to being adapted and filmed as a feature of BBC. In 1975, Duro Ladipo sought to extend his international influence and tour in other parts of the Diaspora and America. The tour of Oba Kò So in Brazil is particularly notable due to the immense respect it received, as the Yoruba traditions and mythology connected the audiences to their own living traditions of Santería that have roots in Nigeria. Later in 1975, Oba Kò So toured the United States as part of the Third World Theatre Festival performing in theaters across the country. The Yoruba traditions brought to life on stage represented a new kind of energy and exhilaration that was incomparable to other theater experiences, as audience members described the music and drumming as "vigorous and rich" and the dance as "enervating". Much of the success of Oba Kò So was in part due to the uniqueness of his creative vision to merge a mythological and human form into the character of Sango, in which Ladipo played himself, as his embodiment of this Yoruba deity reflected a deep personal and cultural connection Ladipo had to the worship of Sango and Yoruba traditions in general.

One of the main innovations of Oba Kò So was that it departed from the traditional Yoruba folk opera and entered into a new postcolonial chapter of Yoruba theater that aimed to reclaim the traditional Yoruba poetry, music, and dance rituals that were denounced by the European colonial powers that promoted the retelling of stories from the Bible and Christian traditions. This play served a larger purpose that reflected the personal journey of Duro Ladipo and many others in reconciling the conflicting influences of Christianity enforced by the colonial authority as well as their ancestral roots of Yoruba traditions. Not only did Ladipo set a precedent for new thematic construction in Yoruba theater with Oba Kò So, but the people he chose to work was an act of resistance in itself, as his recruiting process did not revolve around schooling as done under colonial direction, but rather the merit of their contributions to Yoruba art forms. In a way, Ladipo included his actors, dancers, musicians, and singer in the opportunity to rewrite the history of Yoruba culture as they were all at the forefront of the creation process, contributing their personal experiences as content for the characters of the play.

In Duro Ladipo's Folk Opera Oba Ko so, or The King did Not Hang there are underlying aspects of traditional West African, specifically Yoruba religious practices and culture that is depicted in the opera itself as well as the practices that influenced real people's lives and beliefs in the society the opera is reflecting. For example, The Opera features multiple Igunnu performing, they seem to be a "deity of fertility and good health, who always brings rain, dissipates epidemics and quells anti-social behavior" (Kinni-Olusanyin 33). The appearance of these religious figures within the opera emphasizes the importance of this religious aspect within Yoruba culture as Igunnu performers are masked and do not speak or physically come in contact with any of the speaking characters in the opera highlighting the respect that people within the culture have for them as they are not heavily interacted with because of their divine standing and the idea that Igunnu is hierarchically above humans. The Igunnu are provided space to perform in the opera due to their divine roles within Yoruba religious practices, which are reflected and represented throughout this opera. In addition, musical elements within the opera such as "The bembe drummers flank the mask and, utilizing drum language, direct and critique Igunnu and the others in the prevention of precarious actions, such as going astray or falling" (Kinni-Olusanyin 35). The bembe drummers' interaction with the Igunnu in the opera directly reflects how cultural practices merge and are intertwined with religious practices within the Yoruba tribe. The drummers assisting the Igunnu in performance emulate the social construct of divinity versus humanity as the drummers represent humanity, and divinity is dependent on humanity because if people do not believe in the divine, it no longer exists within the social stratosphere. Therefore, the drummers assisting the Igunnu in the performance highlight how in the drummer's absence the Igunnu would be misguided and flawed during the performance. This point is further emphasized in the recorded version of the opera performed by the National Theatre of Nigeria, where one of the Igunnu bowed to King Shango upon his entrance on stage [3:37]. This choreographic element highlights how the deities within the Yoruba religious culture value and respect their worshipers as they are aware that for them to maintain their status in the religious belief systems they must respect the king, who is an important figure in society that can influence how they are worshiped and the faith that common people have in them.

== Background ==
Shango is the protagonist of the play. According to some historians, he reigned as the king of Oyo and was a figure feared by both his subjects and, across the Niger, by the Borgu and Nupe empires. He was known for his warring and tyrannical tendencies during his life, and was later deified in tribal history and worshiped by some. His era was one of turbulence and also of intrigue. Duro Ladipo was influenced by the writings of the Rev. Samuel Johnson, a Yoruba historian who used a lot of old Oyo sources for his book on the Yorubas. Duro's play created the image of Sango as a tragic hero.

== Plot ==
The play tries to revisit history by portraying a stout and commanding Sango at the height of his powers as a king. Ever mindful of the wishes of the people and in his desire to please them, he set two of his most powerful chiefs against each other. The chiefs, Gbonka and Timi, had grown too powerful and were becoming a nuisance to the kingdom. However, the plot ends up dividing his cabinet and many of his advisers, friends and a wife, Princess Oya, leave him.

Shango's friend Mogba, rather than join the traitors, desires to redeem the battered image of the king. Mogba invokes incantations, causing thunder and lightning to damage the homes of Sango's enemies.
