= Elisabet Kauage =

Papua New Guinean painter (1958–2025)

- Born: 1958; Kerowagi District, Chimbu Province, Papua New Guinea
- Died: 5 February 2025 (aged 66–67); Port Moresby, Papua New Guinea
- Known for: Painting
- Spouse: Mathias Kauage

Elisabet Kauage (1958–2025) was an artist from Papua New Guinea.

== Early life ==
Kauage was born in 1958 in the village of Kambu, in the Kerowagi District of Chimbu Province in Papua New Guinea (PNG). She moved to the nation's capital, Port Moresby, in 1983, beginning to paint in 1986. She was a self-taught artist, learning by observing her husband, Mathias Kauage (1944–2003), who was a pioneer of PNG's contemporary art movement.

== Artistic career ==
During the 1990s, Kauage was a regular participant at the weekend craft markets that were held in the grounds of the Ela Murray International School in Port Moresby, where she sold her paintings with her husband and other self-taught artists, such as her brother, John Siune, and Oscar Towa. During a time of social and cultural upheaval, she specialized in providing detailed observations of everyday life and of interactions between the people of PNG and its expatriate community. Her colourful paintings in the naïve style, inspired by the work of her husband, often featured political issues, Bible stories, PNG's customary practices, adjustment to new technologies, the HIV/AIDS epidemic in PNG, and gender issues, which all provided an interesting record of life in the relatively new country.

Following the death of her husband in 2003, Kauage became the head of the artistic Kauage family, overcoming the culture of PNG that tends to hamper women's independence. Her sons, Chris, Andrew, John, Willey and Michael, and her adopted son, Apa Hugo, also became artists, although this did not attract her three daughters. Her work has been exhibited in Australia, England, Germany, and elsewhere, including the Queensland Art Gallery, the Gallery of Modern Art, Brisbane and the National Gallery of Australia. While selling through galleries overseas, she also continued to sell her paintings at various craft markets around Port Moresby and outside leading hotels, being the only woman to do so. Her success has inspired other women in PNG to become commercial artists.

== Death ==
Kauage died on 5 February 2025 in Port Moresby.
