= Decode Yourself =

Studio album by Ronald Shannon Jackson and the Decoding Society
- Released: 1985
- Recorded: 1985
- Studio: Electric Lady, NYC
- Genre: Free jazz
- Length: 41:06
- Label: Island; ILPS 9827
- Producer: Bill Laswell

Ronald Shannon Jackson chronology
Barbeque Dog (1983)	Decode Yourself (1985)	Live at the Caravan of Dreams (1986)

Decode Yourself is an album by Ronald Shannon Jackson and the Decoding Society, recorded in 1985 for the Island label.

== Critical reception ==
Professional ratings
Review scores
Source	Rating
AllMusic	4.5/5 stars
Robert Christgau	B+
The Encyclopedia of Popular Music	4/5 stars
The Rolling Stone Album Guide	3.5/5 stars

The AllMusic review by Stephen Cook stated: "The range of styles found on drummer Ronald Shannon Jackson's Decode Yourself is amazing, but what really impresses is the way Jackson unifies the disparate strains with his unique arrangements and varied rhythmic support." Jeff Eldredge said that "despite the return of the violin, the addition of the trombone, some interesting stylistic forays into country, bebop, and space funk, and the promise of a Bill Laswell production, the third Island release, Decode Yourself, is marred by a thin sound, gimmicky electronic drum and synthesizer timbres, and (surprisingly) a plodding, four-square rhythmic monotony." The Washington Post wrote that the tracks "have all the classic elements of good jazz writing—captivating melodic figures, surprising changes and rhythmic swing—and are sturdy enough to contain some of the boldest, most aggressive playing in progressive jazz."

== Track listing ==
All compositions by Ronald Shannon Jackson except where noted.

1. "Bebop" (Dizzy Gillespie) - 0:49
2. "Decoding" - 4:15
3. "Thieves Market" - 3:56
4. "Behind Plastic Faces" - 4:55
5. "Software Shuffle" - 2:35
6. "Snake Alley" - 3:44
7. "Undressing" - 7:56
8. "Love Words for a Queen" - 6:29
9. "Tricky Vic" - 3:55

== Personnel ==
- Ronald Shannon Jackson – drums (Sonor and Simmons)
- Robin Eubanks – trombone
- Eric Person – alto saxophone, soprano saxophone
- Akbar Ali – violin
- Onaje Allan Gumbs – synthesizer
- Vernon Reid – electric guitar, steel guitar, Roland guitar synthesizer, banjo
- Melvin Gibbs, Reverend Bruce Johnson – electric bass
