= Abiodun Duro-Ladipo =

Nigerian actress and singer

- Born: Abiodun Duro-Ladipo; 1941 (age 84–85); Nigeria
- Occupation: Actoress
- Spouse: Ladipo

Abiodun Duro-Ladipo (born 1941) is a Nigerian actress and singer of noble Yoruba birth. In 1963, she joined the theatre company of Duro Ladipo, whom she married the following year. Acting in her husband's epic plays, she was particularly successful in the role of Oya in Oba Koso and in the title role of Moremi. In the 1960s and early 1970s, she appeared across Europe at several international festivals. Since her husband's death in 1978, Abiodun has appeared in Nigerian television series and in films promoting African culture, once again playing Moremi in the 2009 film of the same name.

== Biography ==
Abiodun was born into a royal family at Ijan-Ekiti in Nigeria's Ekiti State, thus making her an Omoba of the Yoruba people. Initially interested in becoming a nurse, on completing her secondary education in 1963, she joined the Mbari Mbayo Theatre Group run by Duro Ladipo, soon becoming head of the women's group. In 1964, she married Ladipo. A permanent member of the troupe, she gained fame as an actress, taking the main roles in all the plays performed by the company.

In the 1960s and 1970s, she performed as an actress or singer in theatre and music festivals, including Berlin's Festspiele (1964), London's Commonwealth Arts Festival (1965), the Festival mondial du théâtre de Nancy (1973) and the Yoruba Festival in Zürich (1973). She also appeared in Belgrade, in Iran's Shiraz Arts Festival and the Arts Festival in Rome.

Following her husband's death in 1978, Abiodun managed the theatre company, an unusual task for women at the time. While she preferred stage productions, she was increasingly forced to turn to television, appearing in the musical series Oya Sings (1979) and the drama series B'Inaku (1981). Other television productions included Oyinbo Ajele (1986), Esentaye (1997) and Ayelaagbe (1998), all in support of traditional culture when threatened by colonialism. Her film appearances are based on her earlier stage roles. They include Erelu in Aropin n'Teniyan, Iya Ewe in Ija Orugun and, above all, the title role in Moremi. In 2017, she directed a new version of Moremi, the film titled Moremi Ajasoro.

She is keen to ensure that significant work is documented and she has been collecting newspaper articles about Yorùbá travelling theatre and in particular the Duro Lapido Theatre since 1964. She has a large collection of costumes and memorabilia.

She has in the past commented on how Nigeria's leaders "renege on their promises", but in March 2018, when Duro Ladipo's play Ajagun Nla was presented at the National Theatre in Lagos, Abiodun thanked the government for their support and told Nigerian women that they needed to be patient as wives and mothers, bearing in mind that "our rich culture must be preserved and promoted".

== See also ==
- List of Yoruba people
- List of Nigerian actresses
