= John Kasaipwalova =

Papua New Guinean writer (1949–2023)

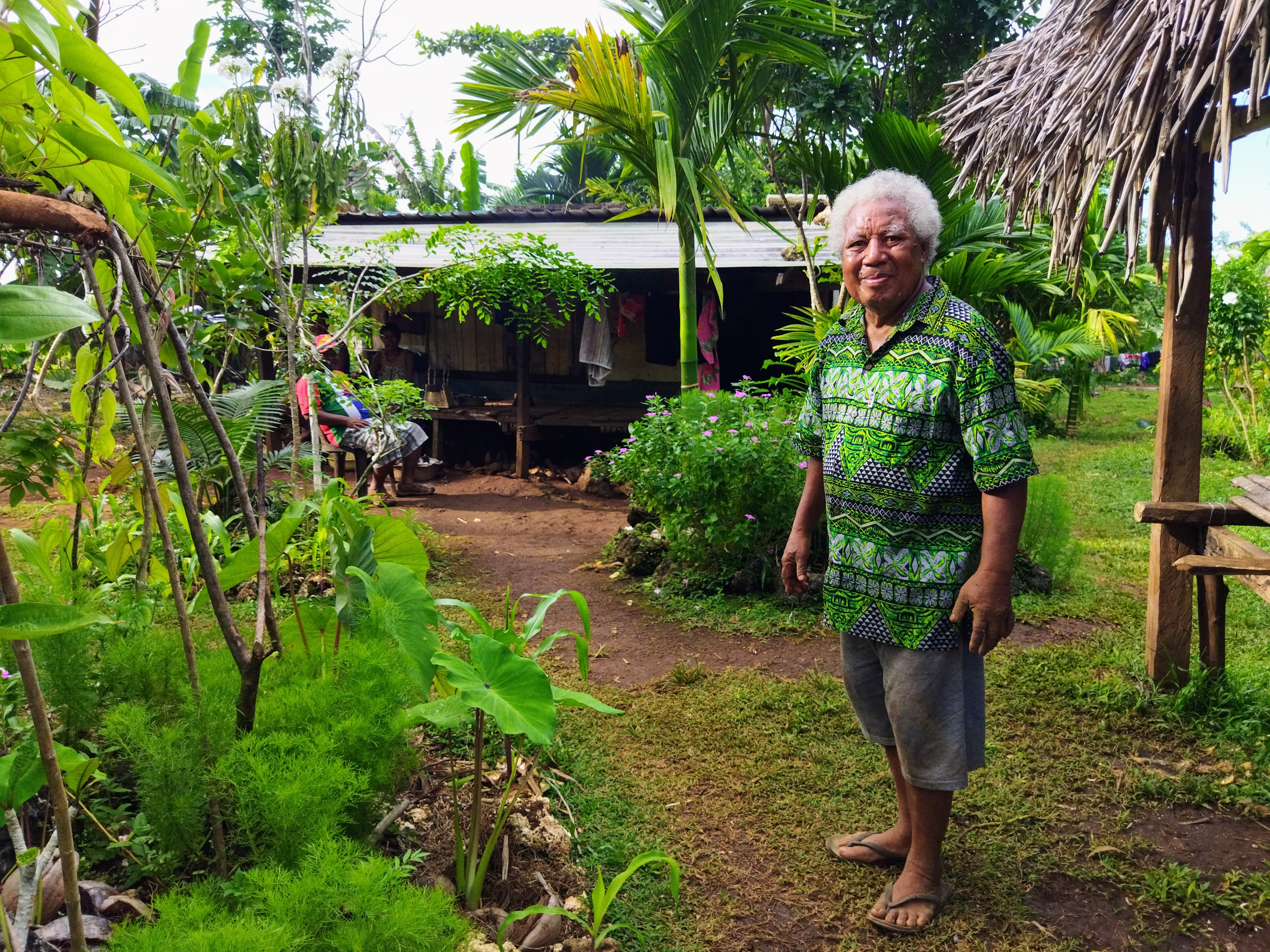

John Kasaipwalova (born 1949, died 2 May 2023) was an author, poet, playwright and revolutionary of Papua New Guinea.

== Biography ==
He was born in Okaikoda Village on Kiriwina Island of the Trobriand Islands, Milne Bay Province of Papua New Guinea, to indigenous parents. His mother, Rosemary, belonged to the clan aristocracy, and his father, Andrew, was the first Catholic catechist on the island. He was originally destined to be a tribal chief, but his father insisted on a formal education. A colonial court ruled in the father's favor, and Kasaipwalova was sent to Catholic school, eventually earning a scholarship to attend the University of Queensland, where he studied veterinary medicine.

While in Australia, he became deeply involved in radical Catholicism and leftist student movements, protesting the Vietnam War and engaging in anti-imperialist activism. He began his literary work during this period. As a member of the Socialist Revolutionary Students’ Alliance, he lost his scholarship and visa and was forced to return home. Though he never formally completed his degree, his influence on Papua New Guinea’s literature and political thought was significant.

In 1972, at the age of 23, he founded the Kabisawali movement upon returning to Kiriwina. The movement, inspired by indigenous systems of reciprocity such as the Kula exchange and Sagali festivals, sought to liberate the island from colonial structures and build an autonomous, cooperative economy. His group won local council elections in 1973 and immediately dissolved the official structures, replacing them with their own: independent courts, administration, cooperatives, a local bank, and a plan for a traditional-style hotel.

For several years, Kiriwina functioned as a de facto autonomous republic. The experiment collapsed after police intervention and financial accusations (from which he was ultimately acquitted), but the movement remains a unique example of postcolonial self-determination rooted in indigenous culture.

After his time at the University of Papua New Guinea (UPNG), where he gained a reputation as an anti-colonial radical, he moved into various business ventures and served on public boards including the National Cultural Commission. He was also on the Council of UPNG for 8 years. In local government, he worked with the Milne Bay Area Authority and the Kiriwina LLG. Since 1995, he was one of the 12 members of the Kiriwina Council of Chiefs. After the death of his uncle, he became the chief of Yalumgwa but chose to live on the outskirts of the village in a house meant to bridge tradition and modernity.

He had three wives: a Papuan, a Chinese woman named Mary, and Vana, a Trobriand Islander. Until the end of his life, he continued writing poetry, experimenting with farming, and seeking reconciliation between the Gospel and local beliefs, between revolution and tradition. He died on 2 May 2023 at Port Moresby General Hospital, leaving behind a powerful literary legacy and an enduring vision of a free and self-sufficient Kiriwina. His final reflections were recorded in a video interview published six months before his death.

== Published works ==
- Hanuabada (a compilation of poetry) (1972)
- Reluctant Flame (a compilation of poetry) (1972)
- Yaulabuta, Kolupa, deli lekolekwa (pilatolu kilivila wosimwaya) (1978)
- Yaulabuta, the passion of Chief Kailaga: an historical poem from the Trobriand Islands (translated into English with Ulli Beier) (1978)
- Kanaka's Dream (satirical play)
- The Rooster in the Confessional (satirical play)
- The Naked Jazz (satirical play)
- My Brother (satirical play)
- My Enemy (satirical play)
- Sail the Midnight Sun (co-author with Greg Murphy) (folk opera) (1980)
- Betel Nut is Bad Magic for Airplanes (short story)

== Other work ==
Kasaipwalova also developed a grassroots co-operative and cultural movement in the Trobriand Islands. His political and cultural vision culminated in the Kabisawali movement, which sought to transform traditional communal systems into a model of autonomous modernity.
