= Braima =

Braima or Braíma is a masculine given name of West African origin, found most commonly in the country of Guinea-Bissau. Notable people with the given name include:

- Braima Camará (born 1968), Bissau-Guinean politician and businessman
- Braima Candé (born 1995), Bissau-Guinean-born Portuguese footballer
- Braíma Injai (born 1975), Bissau-Guinean footballer
- Braima Sambú (born 2001), Bissau-Guinean footballer

== See also ==
- Braimoh
