= The Papuan Villager =

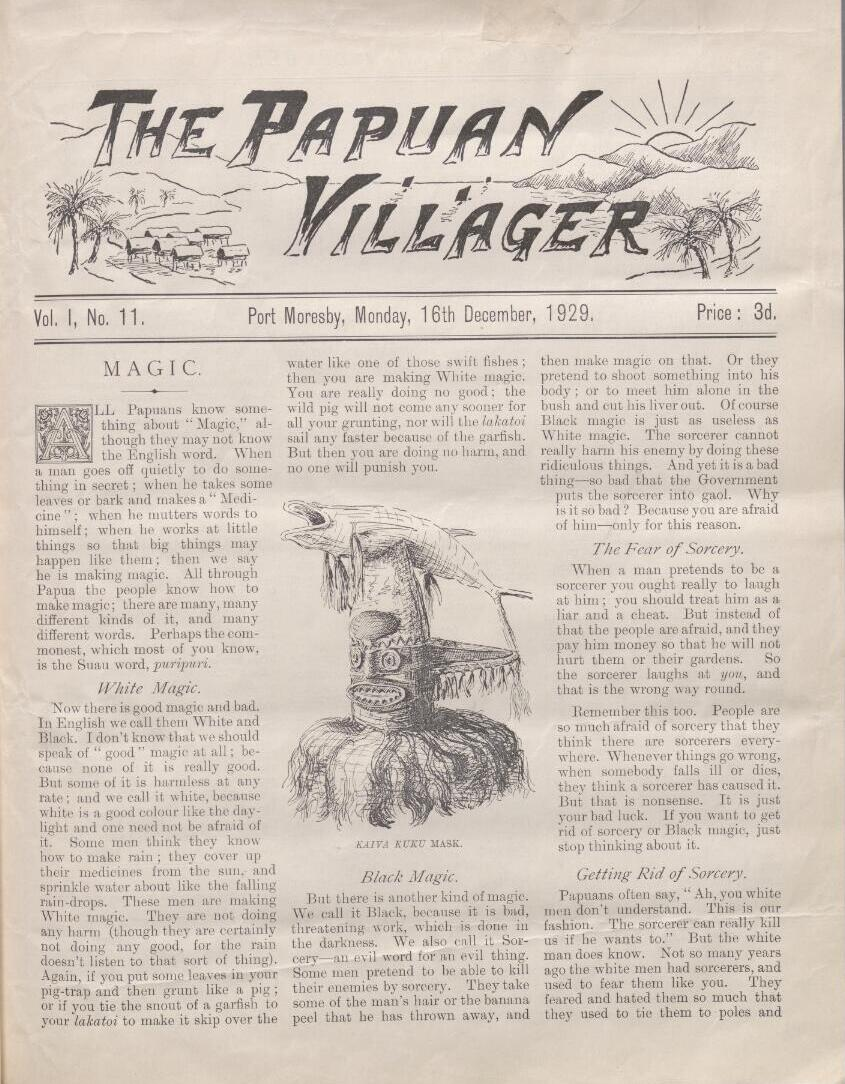
Front page of 16 December 1929, featuring a lead article on magic and sorcery

The Papuan Villager was a monthly English-language newspaper published by the Australian administration of the Territory of Papua (part of present-day Papua New Guinea) from 1929 to 1941. It was written in simple English and targeted towards an indigenous Papuan audience.

== Publication history ==
The Villager was established by government anthropologist F. E. Williams, with support from lieutenant-governor Hubert Murray who funded its publication from the Australian administration's education budget.

The Villager ceased publication in December 1941 following the outbreak of the Pacific War and the suspension of civilian administration in Papua. A similar publication for schoolchildren was later published from 1950 to 1960 under the name Papua and New Guinea Villager.

== Content and readership ==
Williams served as editor of the Villager throughout its existence. It was primarily targeted at Papuan men working for the administration or in Christian missions, although it was also read by women and children. Williams sought contributions from Papuan writers, paying for submissions which included accounts of Papuan folklore and local news. The Villager was published in a tabloid format with significant pictorial content. Williams used his own contributions to "encourage Papuans to retain their own cultures and to use the written word for communication".

Williams claimed to have sold 600 copies of the newspaper's first edition, priced at threepence, and estimated a readership of 1,200 people. By 1931, the newspaper had only 397 subscribers, over half of whom were Europeans, although the readership was considerably larger as copies were distributed for free to missions. Over the entirety of its publication period the Villager recovered only around 15 percent of its costs from revenue, with the rest financed by the administration.

== Analysis ==
Camilla Wedgwood, a contemporary anthropologist, observed that the Villager "seem[ed] to have been of little interest" to Papuans. According to Michael W. Young, although the Villager was promoted as a form of adult education its "sententious content and patronizing tone made it more a vehicle for colonial propaganda", in line with Williams and Murray's paternalistic views of Papuans.

Ellerman (2004) viewed the Villager as a significant milestone in the development of Papua New Guinean literature, being "the first time Papuans had been encouraged to write for publication, to set down their traditional stories, to conduct journalism, to comment on what they were reading, to read about themselves".
