= The Mbari Club =

Centre for cultural activity by Africans founded in Ibadan, Nigeria

The Mbari Club was a centre for cultural activity by African writers, artists and musicians that was founded in Ibadan, Nigeria, in 1961 by Ulli Beier, with the involvement of a group of young writers including Wole Soyinka and Chinua Achebe. Mbari, an Igbo concept related to "creation", was suggested as the name by Achebe. Among other Mbari members were Christopher Okigbo, J. P. Clark and South African writer Ezekiel Mphahlele, Amos Tutuola, Frances Ademola, Jacob Afolabi, Demas Nwoko, Mabel Segun, Uche Okeke, Arthur Nortje and Bruce Onobrakpeya.

The Daily Telegraph in an obituary of Beier noted that "the Mbari Club became synonymous with the optimism and creative exuberance of Africa’s post-independence era. Fela Kuti made his debut as bandleader there, and it became a magnet for artists and writers from all over Africa, America, and the Caribbean." In the words of Toyin Adepoju: "Coming to birth in the flux of the pre-independence and immediate postindependence period in Nigeria, it brought together a constellation of artists whose work embodied the quality of transformation embodied by the aesthetic of creation, decay, and regeneration evoked by the Mbari tradition."

Closely connected with the literary magazine Black Orpheus, which Beier had founded in 1957, Mbari also acted as a publisher during the 1960s — considered to be the only African-based publisher of African literature at the time — producing 17 titles by African writers. Mbari published early works by Clark, Okigbo and Soyinka, poetry by Bakare Gbadamosi (Okiri, 1961), Alex La Guma (A Walk in the Night and Other Stories, 1962), Dennis Brutus (Sirens, Knuckles, Boots, 1963), Kofi Awoonor and Lenrie Peters, as well as translations of francophone poetry. Brutus was chosen as winner of the Mbari Prize, awarded to a black poet of distinction, but turned it down on the grounds of its racial exclusivity.

== History ==
Founded in 1961 by a diverse group of writers, visual artists, musicians, and actors, and active throughout the 1960s, the Mbari Club was originally located in Ibadan's Dugbe Market, on the site of an old Lebanese restaurant that was converted into an open-air performance venue, an art gallery, a library, and an office.

While celebrating the creativity of Nigerian talent in the newly independent nation, Mbari "was an international environment, attracting artists from across Africa and beyond". The premieres of Soyinka's The Trials of Brother Jero and Clark's Song of a Goat were staged at Mbari, and internationally renowned artists were also invited to play or exhibit their work, including Langston Hughes, Jacob Lawrence and Pete Seeger. The club also initiated writing competitions.

As recalled by Lindsay Barrett, secretary of the Mbari Club from 1966 to 1967: "We were in a historic, literary setting ... when the civil war [1967–70] broke out and disintegrated everything."

=== Mbari Mbayo ===
In 1962 a similar club based on the same concepts, called Mbari Mbayo (the name this time reflecting a Yoruba phrase meaning: "Were I to see, I would rejoice" or "When we see it, we shall be happy"), was developed in Oshogbo — about 50 miles northeast of Ibadan — by dramatist Duro Ladipo together with Beier and Mphahlele. Ladipo converted his father's house into an art gallery and a theatre, where he produced his plays. Artists who emerged from the Mbari Mbayo Club in Oshogbo include Twins Seven Seven, Jimoh Buraimoh and Muraina Oyelami.

=== Mbari-Enugu ===
The Mbari-Enugu Club of Eastern Nigeria was established in 1963 and like Mbari Mbayo was particularly a platform for sculpture, painting and literary performance.

== Selected list of people associated with The Mbari Club ==
- Chinua Achebe
- Frances Ademola
- Ulli Beier
- Lindsay Barrett
- J. P. Clark
- Vincent Akwete Kofi
- Ezekiel Mphahlele
- Arthur Nortje
- Amos Tutuola
- Demas Nwoko
- Uche Okeke
- Christopher Okigbo
- Colette Omogbai
- Bruce Onobrakpeya
- Muraina Oyelami
- Ibrahim el-Salahi
- Mabel Segun
- Wole Soyinka

== Legacy ==
In June 2016, the Ibadan Literary Society (IBS) was launched, modelled after the Mbari Club. In December 2019, The Mbari Clubs and Nigerian Modernism, an exhibition focusing on the Mbari Clubs in Ibadan and Osogbo, took place at the Barbican Art Gallery in London.
