= Mark Loria Gallery =

Canadian art gallery

Coordinates: 48.4247°N 123.3672°W

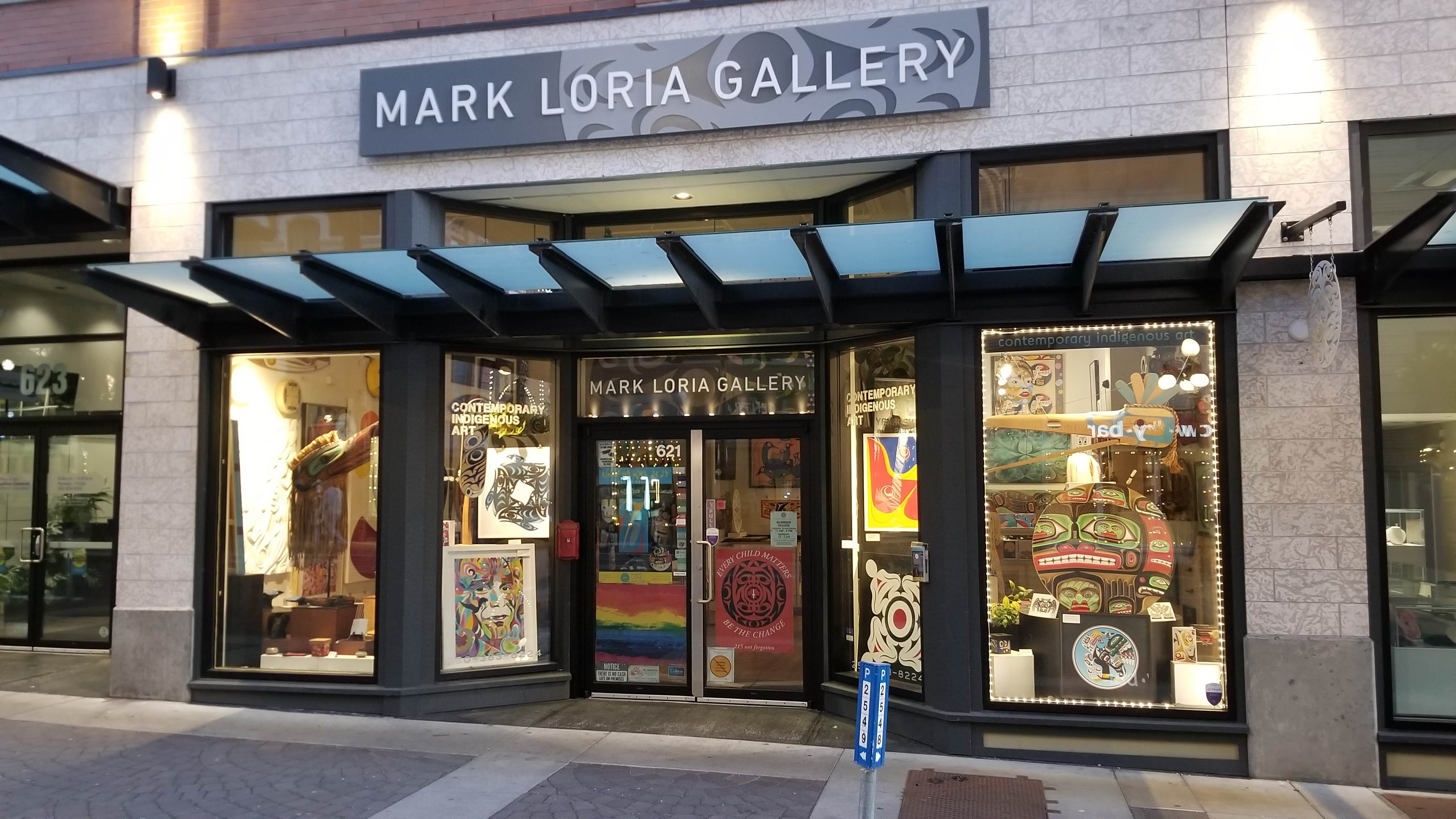
Mark Loria Gallery, July 2024

Mark Loria Gallery (formerly Alcheringa Gallery) is a Canadian contemporary art gallery specializing in Northwest Coast, Coast Salish, and Canadian indigenous fine art. The gallery exhibits artwork from the contemporary period (1960s forward) as well as representing over 60 current artists.

The gallery's goal is to respectfully promote and support indigenous artists and their culture and practices in an era of Truth and Reconciliation Commission of Canada (TRC) and the United Nations' Declaration on the Rights of Indigenous Peoples (UNDRIP).

It was one of the first galleries to make use of the internet in 1996.

Mark Loria Gallery is a member of the Art Dealers Association of Canada.The gallery sells indigenous art to private collectors, governments, museums, architects, designers, and corporate clients, as well as offering other art-related services.

== See also ==
- Northwest Coast art
- Contemporary art
- Canadian art
- Coast Salish art
