= Olanrewaju =

- Gender: Male
- Language: Yoruba

Origin
- Origin: Nigeria
- Meaning: Wealth is the future
- Region of origin: Southwest Nigeria

Other names
- Short form: Lanre

listen

Olanrewaju is a name of Yoruba origin meaning "Wealth is progressing or advancing."

== People with the names include ==
- Lanre Oyebanjo (born 1990), footballer
- Olanrewaju Durodola (born 1977), Nigerian boxer
- Yemi Daniel Olanrewaju (born 1992), football coach
- Gideon Olanrewaju, Nigerian social entrepreneur
- Olanrewaju Ajibola, Nigerian chess player
- Olanrewaju Onadeko, Nigerian law administrator
- Adeola Olanrewaju, Nigerian basketball player
- Olanrewaju Fagbohun, Nigerian lawyer and academic
- Ibrahim Olanrewaju, Nigerian footballer
- Dunni Olanrewaju, Nigerian singer
- Rilwan Olanrewaju Hassan, Nigerian footballer
