= Moving Right Along =

Studio album by World Saxophone Quartet
- Released: 1993
- Recorded: October 18–19, 1993
- Genre: Jazz
- Length: 61:03
- Label: Black Saint
- Producer: Hamiet Bluiett

World Saxophone Quartet chronology
Metamorphosis (1988)	Moving Right Along (1993)	Breath of Life (1995)

Moving Right Along is an album by the jazz group the World Saxophone Quartet, released in 1993 on the Italian Black Saint label.

The album features performances and compositions by Hamiet Bluiett, Eric Person, Oliver Lake and David Murray with a guest appearance by James Spaulding on two tracks.

== Reception ==
Professional ratings
Review scores
Source	Rating
AllMusic	4.5/5 stars
The Penguin Guide to Jazz Recordings	3.5/4 stars

The AllMusic review by Ron Wynn stated, "The WSQ did its usual array of material, from bubbling R&B and funk-tempered numbers to hard bop and swing-oriented tunes, plus two stirring renditions of 'Amazing Grace'."

The authors of The Penguin Guide to Jazz Recordings stated that Person "fits in immediately and well, and sounds closer to the group's overall conception than Spaulding. The emphasis this time is on sharp, tight arrangements."

Writing for Jazz Times, James Marcus commented that Person's arrival "seems to have given the ensemble a shot in the arm, especially when it comes to composing... The WSQ is back -- and as the title puts it, moving right along."

== Track listing ==
1. "Antithesis" (Person) - 7:11
2. "Baba 2" (Bluiett) - 4:34
3. "N.T." (Bluiett) - 4:10
4. "Astral Travels" (Bluiett) - 1:15
5. "Land of Mystery" (Bluiett) - 4:24
6. "Movin' On" (Murray) - 6:15
7. "Amazing Grace, Pt. I" (Newton) - 4:29
8. "Giant Steps" (Coltrane) - 2:59
9. "Urban" (Lake) - 6:01
10. "Sharrod" (Person) - 4:08
11. "M.I.L.D." (Lake) - 6:24
12. "Lightning and Thunder" (Lake) - 3:51
13. "Amazing Grace, Pt. II" (Newton) - 5:22

== Personnel ==
- Hamiet Bluiett — baritone saxophone
- Eric Person — alto saxophone
- Oliver Lake — alto saxophone
- David Murray — tenor saxophone
- James Spaulding — alto saxophone
