= Lanre Fehintola =

British photojournalist

- Born: Olanrewaju Fehintola; 5 February 1958; Lagos, Nigeria
- Died: 18 February 2021 (aged 63); Taunton, England
- Occupation: Photojournalist
- Children: OluFemi Fehintola, Jason Murphy
- Website: www.lanrefehintola.co.uk

Lanre Fehintola (5 February 1958 – 18 February 2021) was a Nigerian–British photojournalist. He was a photographer for The Independent from 1989 until 1991. According to Fehintola, his focus was always "to document the ordinary, everyday, lives of 'real' people whose stories are very seldom told".

== Early life ==
Fehintola's father was an accountant and his mother ran an old people's home in Bradford. They moved to England when Lanre was two years old, in 1960. He was sent to a children's home at age 11 and at 12 to reform school in Durham. He remained there until he was 15.

They said I was unruly and anti-social, but why does a child run away, for fuck's sake? There must be something going wrong in the family!

— Lanre Fehintola

He served two prison terms after leaving the reform school, but on the second term

I started thinking. I was always into making a statement with myself, and crime was a way of doing that, even if it was only reputation, ego. I realised there were other ways I could make a statement.

— Lanre Fehintola

== Work ==
In the late 1980s, Fehintola planned on publishing a book showing the most desperate aspects of Bradford, in Northern England. He captured the lives of prostitutes and criminals, most of them hooked on heroin. Determined to immerse in the lives of his subjects, he felt the need to embed himself into the culture. After experimenting with the drug for his research, he became addicted. Lanre's final piece of work was made in collaboration with his friend and fellow documentarian Leo Regan in 2020/2021. My Friend Lanre, a documentary film exploring his life and work, which travels with him on his final journey, had its world premiere on 17 June 2023 at Sheffield Documentary Film Festival.

== Drug addiction ==
After using drugs to get closer to his subjects, Fehintola became addicted to heroin. His struggle with heroin addiction was documented in Don't Get High on Your Own Supply (1998), directed by his friend Leo Regan. In 2000, he published Charlie Says... Don't Get High on Your Own Supply: An Urban Memoir. A year later, Regan directed another TV documentary on Fehintola, Cold Turkey (2001), as he tries to go cold turkey in his flat, without medication.

Fehintola died on 18 February 2021 in Taunton. He had been working on a long-term project with friend and filmmaker Leo Regan to complete the trilogy they began in 1998. Delivering a eulogy at Fehintola's funeral Regan said:

He was an extraordinary artist. He embraced each and every experience with fearlessness, compassion and curiosity. Even in dying, he wanted to document the process, learn from it, inform others. - Leo Regan
