= Black Orpheus (magazine) =

West African literary journal (1957–1975)

- Issue number 1
- Founder: Ulli Beier
- Founded: 1957
- Final issue: 1975
- Based in: Nigeria
- Language: English

Black Orpheus: A Journal of African and Afro-American Literature was a Nigeria-based literary journal founded in 1957 by German expatriate editor and scholar Ulli Beier that has been described as "a powerful catalyst for artistic awakening throughout West Africa". Its name derived from a 1948 essay by Jean-Paul Sartre, "Orphée Noir", published as a preface to Anthologie de la nouvelle poésie nègre et malgache, edited by Léopold Sédar Senghor. Beier wrote in an editorial statement in the inaugural volume that "it is still possible for a Nigerian child to leave a secondary school with a thorough knowledge of English literature, but without even having heard of Léopold Sédar Senghor or Aimé Césaire", so Black Orpheus became a platform for Francophone as well as Anglophone writers.

The Congress for Cultural Freedom, a front group set up by the Central Intelligence Agency, was a funder of the magazine.

The magazine ceased publication in 1975.

== History ==
Black Orpheus was "a journal of African and Afro-American literature" established in 1957 by university professor Ulli Beier. It was produced in Ibadan, Nigeria, and was groundbreaking as the first African literary periodical in English, publishing poetry, art, fiction, literary criticism, and commentary. Its editors included Wole Soyinka and Es'kia Mphahlele (1960–1964).

Characterised by its pan-African reach, Black Orpheus also published in English translation the work of Francophone writers, among them Léopold Senghor, Camara Laye, Aimé Césaire, and Hampâté Bâ, as well as playing a significant role in the careers of such notable authors and artists as Wole Soyinka, John Pepper Clark, Gabriel Okara, Dennis Brutus, Kofi Awoonor, Andrew Salkey, Léon Damas, Ama Ata Aidoo, Cyprian Ekwensi, Alex La Guma, Bloke Modisane, Birago Diop, D. O. Fagunwa, Wilson Harris, Valente Malangatana, Jacob Afolabi, Colette Omogbai, and Ibrahim el-Salahi. Many of them featured in a 1964 anthology edited by Beier, Black Orpheus: An Anthology of New African and Afro-American Stories, which was published in Lagos, London, Toronto, and New York.

Black Orpheus was highly influential; Abiola Irele – the magazine's editor from 1968 – wrote in the Journal of Modern African Studies: "The steady development of Black Orpheus over the last seven years amounts to a remarkable achievement. It has succeeded in breaking the vicious circle that seems to inhibit the development of a proper reading public by its continued existence, by its very availability; more than that, it has also gone on to establish itself as one of the most important formative influences in modern African literature.…It can be said, without much exaggeration, that the founding of Black Orpheus, if it did not directly inspire new writing in English-speaking Africa, at least coincided with the first promptings of a new, modern, literary expression and re-inforced it by keeping before the potential writer the example of the achievements of the French-speaking and Negro American writers."

Beier also founded the Mbari Club, in 1961, a cultural hub for African writers that was closely connected with Black Orpheus, and during the 1960s also acted as a publisher — considered to be the only African-based publisher of African literature at the time — producing 17 titles by African writers.

Having earned a reputation as "the doyen of African literary magazines", Black Orpheus eventually ceased publication in 1975. The journals have been largely digitzed recently.

== See also ==
- Présence Africaine
- Transition Magazine
