= Eric Person =

American saxophone player (born 1963)

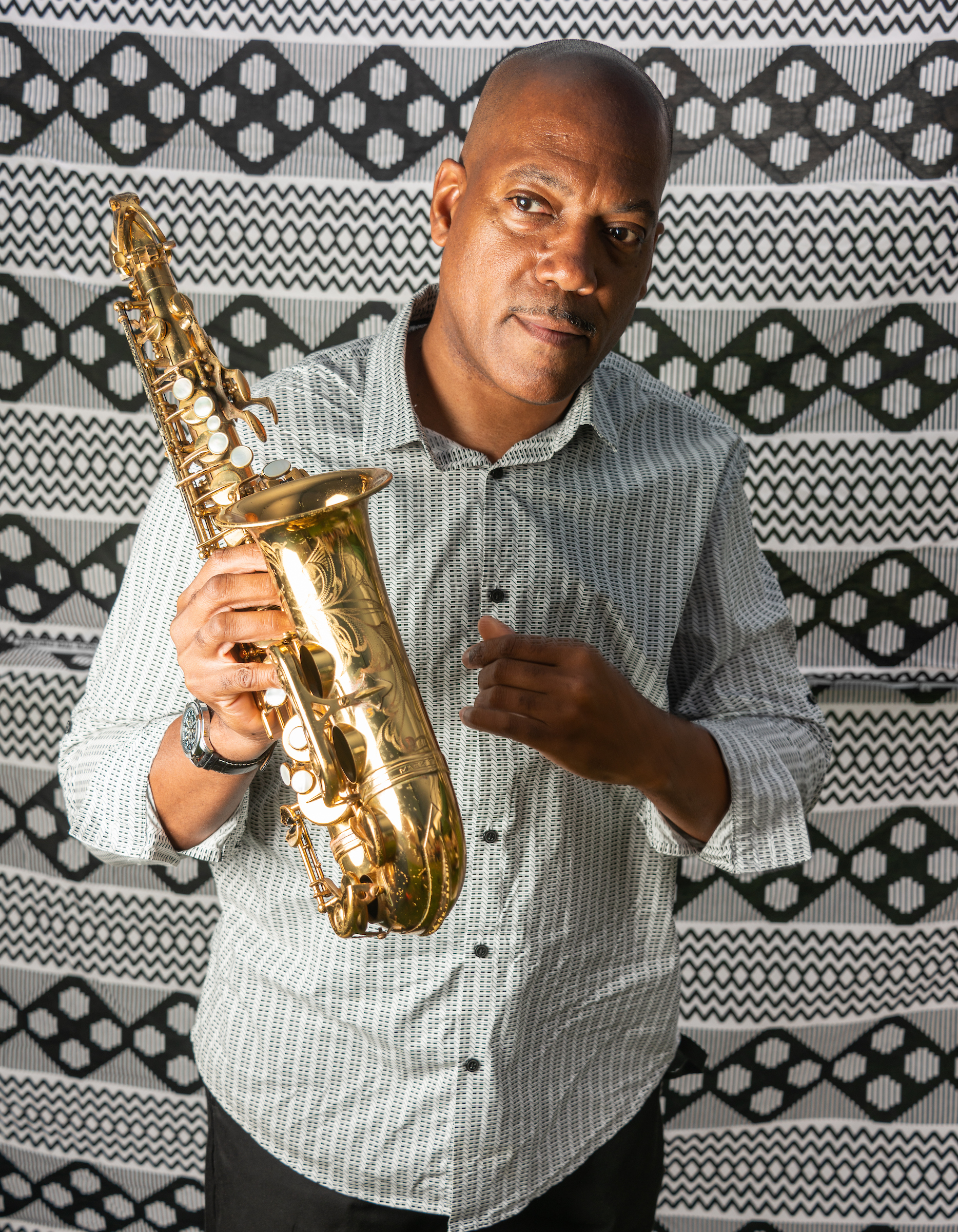

Background information
- Born: May 2, 1963 (age 62)
- Genres: Jazz
- Occupation: Musician
- Instrument: Saxophone flute
- Years active: 1982–present
- Labels: Virgin Records; Island Records; ECM Records; De Werf Records; Sunjump Records; Distinction Records
- Member of: Meta-Four
- Formerly of: World Saxophone Quartet

Eric Person (born May 2, 1963 in St. Louis, Missouri) is an American alto and soprano saxophone player and leader of Meta-Four. Since moving to New York City in 1982, Person has performed and recorded with jazz masters McCoy Tyner, Dave Holland, Houston Person, Donald Byrd, Chico Hamilton, John Hicks and the World Saxophone Quartet, and rock, funk and world music figures like Vernon Reid, Ben Harper, Ofra Haza and Bootsy Collins.

== 1982–92 New York City ==
Eric Person moved from St.Louis, Missouri, to New York City on May 17, 1982. Shortly after his arrival, he played his first New York City performances with the John Hicks Big Band at the Public Theater. In September 1983, Eric auditioned and landed the gig with drummer Chico Hamilton. Person performed with Hamilton off and on throughout the 80's and 90's. He toured the United States, Europe, Japan, and South America with Hamilton and recorded six CDs with him.

== Recordings ==
- (1993) Arrival
- (1994) Prophecy
- (1997) More Tales To Tell
- (1999) Extra Pressure
- (2003) Live at Big Sur
- (2005) Reflections
- (2007) Rhythm Edge
- (2010) The Grand Illusion
- (2012) Thoughts on God
- (2015) DuoScope
- (2022) Blue Vision featuring Houston Person
- (2024) Rhythm Edge (remastered)
- (2026) Extra Pressure (remastered)

With Ronald Shannon Jackson

- (1985) Decode Yourself (Island Records)
- (1986) Live at the Caravan of Dreams Ronald Shannon Jackson Album (Caravan of Dreams)
- (1987) When Colors Play
- (1988) Texas ("Talkeye")
- (1990) Taboo (Virgin Records)
- (2000) Live at Greenwich House

With Dave Holland

- (1995) Dream of the Elders (ECM Records)
- (2004) Rarum, Vol. 10: Selected Recordings

With Chico Hamilton

- (1988) Euphoria
- (1991) Arroyo
- (1993) Trio!
- (1994) My Panamanian Friend (The music of Eric Dolphy)
- (1999) Timely
- (2001) Foreststorn (with Arthur Blythe and Steve Turre)

With Chris Joris

- (2007) Rainbow Country (De Werf Records)
- (2011) Marie's Momentum

With John Esposito

- (2006) The Blue People
- (2008) A Book of Five Rings (Sunjump Records)
- (2022) Laura

With Ben Harper

- (1997) The Will to Live (Virgin Records)
- (1997) Jah Work (EP)

With World Saxophone Quartet

- (1994) Moving Right Along
