= Mathias Kauage =

Papua New Guinean artist (1944–2003)

- Born: Mathias Kauage O.B.E. 1944; Miugu, Chimbu Province, Papua New Guinea
- Died: 2003 (aged 58–59)
- Known for: Painting
- Spouse: Elisabet Kauage
- Awards: Order of the British Empire for services to the arts by Queen Elizabeth II.

Mathias Kauage OBE (c. 1944 – 20 May 2003) was a Papua New Guinean painter and printmaker, regarded as a founding figure of the country's contemporary art. Born in the Chimbu highlands, he went to Port Moresby as a labourer in the late 1960s and began making art after seeing an exhibition by Timothy Akis in 1969. His drawings, screenprints and acrylic paintings took as their subjects Papua New Guinea's independence, its politics and the growth of town life. He was made an Officer of the Order of the British Empire in the 1998 New Year Honours.

== Early life ==
Kauage was born around 1944 in Miugu No. 1 village in the Gembogl area of what is now Chimbu Province. He first met Europeans at around the age of twelve when an Australian doctor arrived by air to vaccinate the village. During this first encounter, Kauage bit the doctor on the arm, which later became the subject of one of Kauage's paintings. In the late 1960s he moved to Port Moresby, where he worked as a labourer and cleaner.

== Career ==
In 1969 Kauage visited an exhibition by Timothy Akis at the University of Papua New Guinea, which was the first show there by a Papua New Guinean artist. There, he met Ulli Beier and his wife Georgina, who was an artist and encourage Kauage to pursue art. Shortly thereafter, he began working at the university and held his first exhibition, which was a display of woodcuts. He worked at the university for several years and experimented with a variety of different media, including line drawings, panel sculptures, and colour paintings.

Kauage was the recipient of one of first-ever fellowships of the National Art School and he stayed connected with the school until the late 1980s, where he had solo exhibitions in 1976, 1981, and 1984. In 1987, he produced a series of eleven works following the life and death of Iambekey Okuk, a Chimbu politician. During this time he alternated between creating commercial art pieces to support his family and more personal pieces of art, with one such commercial piece being art for postage stamps.

In 1996, Kauage's paintings were exhibited in Glasgow at the opening of the Gallery of Modern Art. Kauage attended the ceremony and met Queen Elizabeth II, later creating the painting Kauage Flies to Scotland for Opening of New Museum of Contemporary Art to document the event. At the meeting, Kauage gifted the Queen a painting, Missis Kwin, which portrayed the Queen in a traditional headdress. During the 1998 New Year Honours he was appointed an Officer of the Order of the British Empire. He died on 20 May 2003.

== Style and legacy ==
Kauge's paintings were noted for their use of firm outlines and bright colours. He consistently drew images of birds and humans co-existing, along with representing helicopters, aeroplanes, and cars with traditional geometric patterns. He signed many of his later works with the inscription "Kauage, Artist of PNG."

Kauage's wife Elisabet taught herself to paint by watching him, and several of their sons became artists as well. After his death, Kiri Chan described him as "one of the founding fathers of contemporary art in Papua New Guinea" and Frank Howarth, a director of the Australian Museum, described him as the country's best-known contemporary artist.
