= Lanre Buraimoh =

Nigerian-born award-winning artist

- Born: 1976 (age 49–50); Osogbo, Osun State, Nigeria
- Occupation: Artist
- Years active: 1990–present

Lanre Buraimoh is a Nigerian-born artist who is based in Texas, US. His "bead paintings" are exhibited internationally.

== Art work ==
Buraimoh received art training from his parents, Chief Jimoh Buraimoh and Alake Buraimoh, both contemporary artists well known in Nigeria and abroad. Lanre Buraimoh's art is inspired by the beadwork of the Yoruba people of West Africa, who have traditionally incorporated beads in their art forms and to decorate the crowns, shoes and walking sticks of their kings. Buraimoh's innovative pieces adapt this tradition to the contemporary art form of "bead painting." His paintings are adorned with thousands of small, colorful glass beads that depict Yoruba objects and symbols. These include drums and native drummers, masks, lizards, foxes and the Shankofa bird—a mythical bird with an egg in its mouth that is shown flying forward while looking backward. The egg "represents the knowledge of the past upon which wisdom is based and also signifies the future". Buraimoh's pieces also reflect traditional Yoruba beliefs about love, entertainment, and unity.

In 2025, Buraimoh received a Houston Arts Alliance Support for Artists and Creative Individuals grant for "Neighborhood Narratives – Visual Tales from the Heart of the Community." In February 2025, Buraimoh's work was featured in Houston Harmony: Celebrating Cultural Diversity, an exhibition organized by the Houston Arts Alliance at the Julia Ideson Hester House Community Center in Houston.

In February 2026, Buraimoh was featured in The Black Experience: Past, Present and Future, a group exhibition at Bisong Art Gallery in Houston curated by the Dream Affect Foundation.

== Recognition ==
- 2019, Houston Artadia Fellowship
- 2017, Juror's Award at the University Museum at Texas Southern University.
- Choice Grand Prize Award at Citywide African American Artists Exhibition at Texas Southern University Museum.

== Exhibitions ==
- 2019, 19th Annual Citywide Exhibition, University Museum at Texas Southern University, Houston, Texas
- 2019, Summer Group Art Show, Wasagaming Art Center, Manitoba, Canada
- 2017, Art of Africa, Mytrunk Gallery, Denmark
- 2012, 12th Annual Citywide Exhibition, University Museum at Texas Southern University, Houston, Texas
