= Afi Ekong =

Nigerian artist and arts promoter

- Afi Ekong in the 1960s
- Born: Constance Afiong Ekong; 30 June 1930
- Died: 24 February 2009 (aged 78)
- Education: Oxford College of Arts and Technology; Saint Martin's School of Art
- Occupations: Artist and arts promoter

Chief Constance Afiong "Afi" Ekong, Lady Attah (26 June 1930 – 24 February 2009) was a Nigerian artist and arts promoter.

== Early life ==
Afi Ekong was born to Efik and Ibibio parents in Calabar, Nigeria, as a member of the royal family of Edidem Bassey Eyo Epharaim Adam III. She attended Duke Town School and Christ Church School in Calabar. She trained as a painter and studied fashion design in England at the Oxford College of Arts and Technology, Saint Martin's School of Art, and the Central School of Art and Design. Afi married at the age of 19 to Mr. Abdiel, who was a district officer during the colonial era.

== Career ==
Ekong began her art studies in London in 1951 at the Oxford College of Arts and Technology. She later went on to Saint Martin's School of Art in 1955, then returned to Lagos in 1957. In 1958, at the Exhibition Centre Marina, Ekong was the first female artist to hold a solo exhibition in Lagos. In 1961, she had a solo exhibition at Galeria Galatea in Buenos Aires. She owned and operated the Bronze Gallery in various locations in Lagos and on the Fiekong Estate in Calabar. She was the manager of the Lagos Arts Council, a founding member of the Society of Nigerian Artists, supervisor of Gallery Labac from 1961, and chair of the Federal Arts Council Nigeria from 1961 to 1967. She regularly appeared on a Nigerian television program called Cultural Heritage to promote the arts. In 1963, she was featured in a New York Times photo essay as an example of the "new African woman" after independence. She also chaired a UNESCO commission in the 1970s and, in 1990, the National Council of Women's Societies Committee on Arts and Crafts. Ekong was the first Nigerian woman to be academically trained in art at Oxford College. Her inspiration for the artwork was traditionally or culturally based. Afi's work "Grief" was critically analyzed on the Chrysler Museum of Art on a YouTube channel.

Ekong advocated for women's voices to be heard. Ekong's work to advance the arts and women's education in West Africa was recognized in 1962 when she was proclaimed "The Star of Dame Official of the Human Order of African Redemption," by President William Tubman of Liberia. She was also an ordained elder in the Presbyterian Church.

== Personal life ==
In 1949, Afi Ekong married Prince Abdul Azizi Attah, son of the Atta of Igbirra, a government official. She died in 2009 in Calabar at the age of 78. The Bronze Gallery remains in operation in Calabar today, paintings by Afi Ekong are in the University of Lagos Library, and she owned a large acreage of land in Calabar prior to her demise.
