= F. E. Williams =

Australian anthropologist (1893–1943)

F.E. Williams in Papua

Francis Edgar Williams (9 February 1893 – 12 May 1943) was an Australian anthropologist who worked for the government of the Territory of Papua from 1922 to 1942.

== Early life ==
Born in Malvern, South Australia and educated at Kyre College, the Baptist South Australia school, Williams graduated from the University of Adelaide in 1914 with high honours, and was accordingly awarded a Rhodes Scholarship to study at the University of Oxford. He nevertheless decided to join the Australian Imperial Force in 1915 and served in France as a lieutenant in the 32nd Battalion. Promoted to the honorary rank of captain in early 1918, he served in a secret mission in Caucasus under General Lionel Dunsterville. In 1919, he took up his Rhodes Scholarship at Balliol, and graduated in anthropology in 1921.

== Papua New Guinea ==
Back in Australia at the end of the year, he met in February 1922 the Lieutenant-Governor of Papua, Hubert Murray, who was looking for a young and strong Oxford graduate to serve as an assistant government anthropologist next to Dr William Mersh Strong, more a practitioner than a scientist. Appointed on 8 March 1922, Williams was promoted to Government Anthropologist when Strong retired in 1928, and kept the position until the demise of the Papuan administration in 1942. He married Constance Laura Dennis, a kindergarten teacher from Vancouver, in December 1926. She stayed with Williams in Papuan, assisting him with his reports and field notes. Their son Francis, but known as Jack, was born in Canada in 1927. Due to a brain tumor found in infancy leading to him becoming almost sightless Jack was sent to a school for the blind in England, with Constance frequently spending time there with him.

Williams was one of the few anthropologists of his time able to spend two continuous decades in the same location without having to regularly return to a metropolitan university or institution. Of the nineteen years spent in Papua more than five of those he lived in Papuan villages. His fieldwork consisted of seven major studies: Vailala (Purari Delta); Orokaiva (Northern Division); Keraki (Morehead River); Koiari (Central Division); Elena (Gulf Division); Foi (Lake Kutubu), and Keveri (Eastern Division) in addition to smaller field studies in about a dozen other societies. While in the field Williams did many of the standard tasks of anthropologists at the time he differed from his peers by revisiting field sites many times over years. This frequent exposure to the Papuan culture led his work to be far more realistic than the often romanticized fieldwork and subjects of his contemporaries.

During those twenty years of heavy field work, Williams published many books and articles, both monographic and general. His writing style was described as "clear, candid, unpretentious, and at times wryly self-deprecating." In addition to his reports Williams founded and edited The Papuan Villager (1929-42), a monthly newspaper in simple English that became a vehicle for colonial propaganda. His criticism of Functionalism came forward in his writing, creating a divide between himself and many of his peers.

=== Photography ===
During his employment with the government of Papua, Williams photographed around eighteen different ethnographic locations across eight administrative divisions, resulting in almost 2000 glass plates and negatives. What made his photography unique was the length of time and expansive area covered in his photographs. His style is emblematic of the need for 'photographic realism' that was common in the time, with an aim to document as accurately as possible the culture he was studying. Williams' collection are mainly housed in the National Archives of Australia in Canberra and the National Archives of Papua New Guinea in Port Moresby.

=== Awards ===
Of the many reports that Williams wrote for the Papuan government, Orokaiva Society (1930) resulted in an M.A. honors degree by the University of Adelaide, Papuans of the Trans-Fly (1936) gained him a B.Sc. from Oxford, where he also received an additional D. Sc. in 1941 for Drama of Orokolo (1940). Williams also received a Wellcome gold medal for anthropological research (1933), the Cilento medal (1935), and a Rockefeller fellowship (1933-34).

== World War II ==
When World War II expanded to the Southern Pacific in December 1941, Williams came back to Australia and enlisted as a lieutenant to serve with military intelligence. He was promoted captain in November 1942. Among his many works, he wrote You and Native, a booklet advising the Allied soldiers on how to behave with Papuans. In early 1943, Williams was sent back to Papua to serve as a liaison officer with the Australian New Guinea Administrative Unit. On 12 May, he died in a plane crash on the Owen Stanley Range, 20 km south of Kokoda. He was buried in a military cemetery at Bomana.

== Publications ==
- The Vailala Madness and the Destruction of Native Ceremonies in Gulf Division. Port Moresby: Edward George Baker, Government Printer, 1923.
- The Collection of Curios and the Preservation of Native Culture. Port Moresby: Edward George Baker, Government Printer, 1923. http://nla.gov.au/nla.obj-39980482
- The Natives of the Purari Delta. Port Moresby: Government Printer, 1924. http://nla.gov.au/nla.obj-192001115
- Native Education: The Language of Instruction and Intellectual Education. Port Moresby: Edward George Baker, Government Printer, 1928.
- Orokaiva Magic. London: Oxford University Press, 1928.
- Orokaiva Society. Oxford: Clarendon Press,1930.
- Sentiments and Leading Ideas in Native Society. Port Moresby: Edward George Baker, Government Printer, 1932.
- Practical Education: The Reform of Native Horticulture. Port Moresby: Walter Alfred Bock, Acting Government Printer, 1933.
- Depopulation of the Suau District. Port Moresby: Walter Alfred Bock, Acting Government Printer, 1933. http://nla.gov.au/nla.obj-52857518
- The Blending of Cultures: An Essay on the Aims of Native Education. Port Moresby: Walter Alfred Bock, Government Printer, 1935. http://nla.gov.au/nla.obj-52804436
- Papuans of the Trans-fly. Oxford: Clarendon, 1936.
- Bull-roarers in the Papuan Gulf. Port Moresby: Walter Alfred Bock, Government Printer, 1936.
- The Grasslanders. Canberra: L.F. Johnston, Government Printer,1939.
- Drama of Orokolo: The Social and Ceremonial Life of the Elema. Oxford: Clarendon Press, 1940.
- Natives of Lake Kutubu, Papua. Sydney: Australian National Research Council, 1941.
