= Braimoh =

Braimoh or Braimah is a Ghanaian (Braimah) and Nigerian (Braimoh) name that may refer to:

Given name

- Braimah Kamoko (born 1980), Ghanaian professional boxer

Surname

- Alhassan Braimah, Ghanaian politician and author
- Joseph Adam Braimah (1916–1987), Ghanaian politician, author and chief
- Maria Braimoh (born 1990), Nigerian badminton player
- Salifu Adam Braimah (1965–2026), Ghanaian politician
- Suleiman Braimoh (born 1989), Nigerian-American basketball player in the Israel Basketball Premier League
- Tanko Braimah (born 1979), Ghanaian sprinter
- Yisa Braimoh (born 1942), Nigerian politician

== See also ==
- Braima
