= Susanne Wenger =

Austrian-Nigerian artist (1915–2009)

Olorisha Susanne Wenger MFR
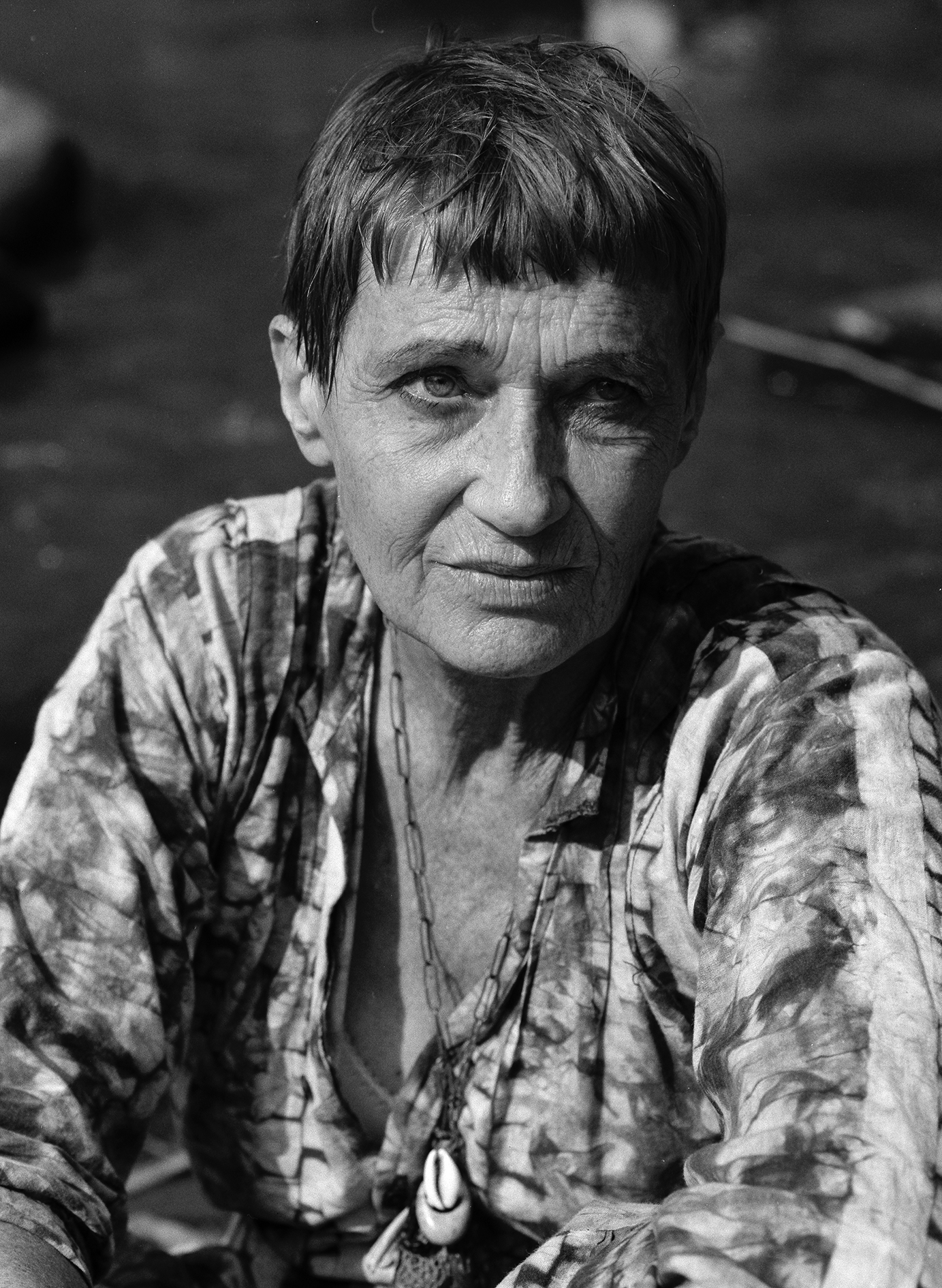
- Wenger, c. 1978
- Born: 4 July 1915; Graz, Austria
- Died: 12 January 2009 (aged 93); Oshogbo, Osun, Nigeria
- Education: School of Applied Arts in Graz
- Alma mater: Academy of Fine Arts Vienna
- Movement: Oshogbo school
- Website: susannewenger-aot.org

Susanne Wenger MFR, also known as Adunni Olorisha (4 July 1915 – 12 January 2009), was an Austrian-Nigerian artist and Yoruba priestess who migrated to Nigeria. Her main focus was the Yoruba culture and she was successful in building an artist cooperative in Osogbo. She partnered with local artists in Osogbo to redevelop and redecorate the Osun Osogbo Sacred Grove with sculptures and carvings depicting the various activities of the Orishas.

Wenger was a leading advocate for the preservation of the Osun Grove. Due to her efforts, the grove was made a national monument in 1965, and was later marked as a world heritage site.

== Early life and career ==
Susanne Wenger was born in Graz, Austria. She is the daughter of an English and French high school teacher and a mother born to a high ranking Austro-Hungarian army officer. Wenger attended the School of Applied Arts in Graz in 1930, specializing in pottery. She later continued her studies, first at the Higher Graphical Federal Education and Research Institute and then at the Academy of Fine Arts Vienna alongside, among others, Herbert Boeckl. While at the academy, she learned the fresco technique and improved on her drawing skills.

After the end of World War II, Wenger was an employee of the communist children's magazine Unsere Zeitung ("Our Newspaper"). She designed the cover of the first edition. In 1947 she was invited by friends to co-found the Vienna Art Club. In Vienna, during and after the war, many of her works were experimental, drawing inspiration from spirituality; these works included surreal colored pencil drawings and surreal images difficult to decipher.

In 1947, Wenger traveled to Italy, the trip was given to her as a prize for winning a poster competition. After her return, she found some success selling her works to an art dealer, Johann Egger, who also held works by Hans Arp, Paul Klee and Piet Mondrian.

After living in Italy and Switzerland and upon the suggestion of Egger, in 1949 Wenger went to Paris, where she met her future husband, the linguist Ulli Beier. That same year, Beier was offered a position as a phoneticist in Ibadan, Nigeria. The position was only offered to a married lecturer, the couple who had given little consideration to marriage prior to the offer decided to get married in London and emigrated to Nigeria. At Ibadan, the new college was at the outskirt of the city and the predominantly British faculty rarely fraternized with their African students. The couple's reaction to the colonial setting was to move from Ibadan to the village of Ede the following year. In Nigeria, Wenger embraced parts of African arts and craft and engaged in adire textile art.

Within a year of her arrival, she went through a bout of illness caused by tuberculosis, after which she became more spiritual and turned to the Yoruba religion. She became attracted to the religion after meeting Ajagemo, a priest of Obatala at Ede. Ajagemo introduced Wenger to the Yoruba world view, language and religion, and both individuals soon developed a special bond. During this period, Wenger experimented with colorful designs influenced by adire techniques.

Wenger and Beier ultimately divorced, with Wenger later marrying local drummer Lasisi Ayansola Onilu, by which time she was establishing herself as an active participant in the revival of the Orisha religion. Wenger left Ede and moved to Ilobu, before she finally settled at Osogbo in 1961. While living in the town, she became interested in the shrines dedicated to Orishas; she later rebuilt many of the religious carvings within sacred places and was also commissioned by the Osogbo District Council to renovate many of the local shrines, in particular the shrine dedicated to the river goddess, Oshun. Wenger was also initiated into the cults of Obatala, Soponna, and Ogboni, and was later given the chieftaincy title of Adunni Olorisha.

She was founder of the archaic-modern art school "New Sacred Art", a branch of the wider Oshogbo school, and became the guardian of the Sacred Grove of the Osun goddess on the banks of the Osun River in Oshogbo.

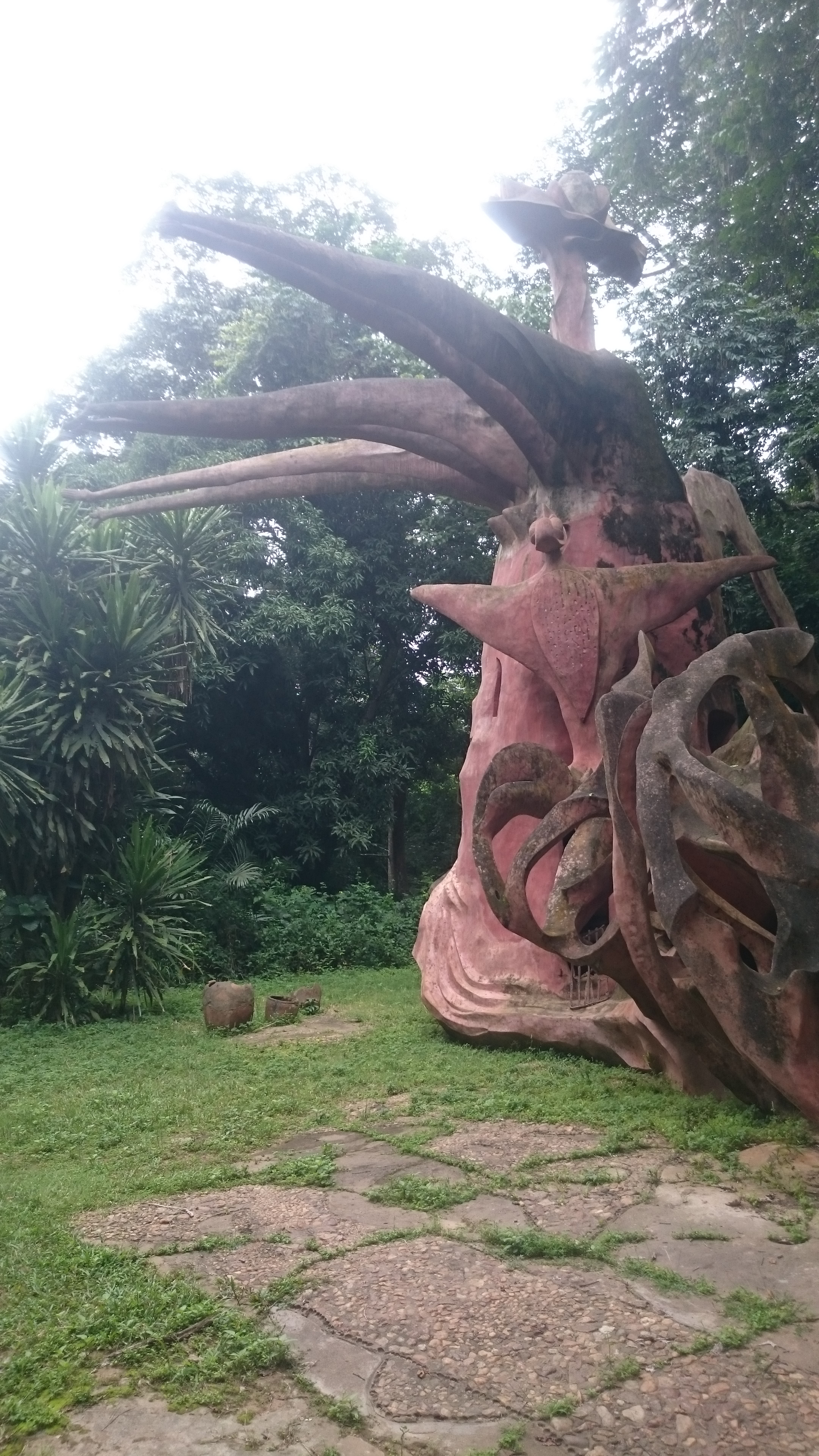
Osun grove

=== Osun grove ===
Wenger's sculptural works can be found in Osun Grove, an area parallel to the Osun River. Her involvement with the grove dates back to the 1960s. Upon the invitation of an Osun high priestess who was troubled by commercial interests and termites destroying shrine facilities, sacred sculptures and carvings, Wenger teamed up with the Public Works Department and many local area artists to eradicate the termites and also redevelop the carvings and buildings within the shrine using both wood and cement.

Her works at the grove are influenced by traditional Yoruba religion, but deviate from previous pieces that concentrated on gods and goddesses. Sometimes called New Sacred Art, Wenger's works not only express the activities and functions of the specific orishas but also depict the social life of adherents and non adherents of the traditional religion. Some of her well known efforts include the shrines dedicated to Alajere and Iyamoopo raised to about 20 feet in height and base as wide as 50 feet.

Wenger's group of apprentices had a history of craftsmanship within their lineages, so they helped her redevelop and redecorate the ancient shrines and made sculptures influenced by Yoruba mythology.

Wenger's life and work at Osun Grove is the subject of The Oshun Diaries, a memoir by Diane Esguerra (Eye Books, 2019).

== Personal life ==
Chief Wenger lived in a three-storey residence in Osogbo originally leased by her first husband Chief Ulli Beier when he was with the Institute of Mural Studies. In 1965, she shared the building with her second husband, the drummer Lasisi: both lived on the first floor while her previous husband Beier lived on the second floor. She continued with the lease after Beier left in 1970, and remained in the house following her divorce from Lasisi. Her residence showcases her art, as many of the house's furniture depicts an aspect of the Yoruba art form that Chief Wenger loved so much.

== Death ==
On 12 January 2009, Wenger died at the age of 93 in Oshogbo.

== Legacy and honours ==
The sculptures that were placed in Oshun's grove from the late 1950s onwards, sculptures that were created by her followers and local artists, have belonged to the UNESCO World Heritage Site since 2005.

In 2005, the Nigerian government admitted her as a member of the Order of the Federal Republic.

For her efforts on behalf of the Yoruba, she was given a chieftaincy title of the Osogbo community by the king, or Ataoja, of Oshogbo.

== Exhibitions ==
- 1995: Retrospective of the 80th Birthday, Minoritenkirche Stein an der Donau (outside the Old Town of Krems)
- 2004: On a holy river in Africa, Kunsthalle Krems
- 2006: Susanne Wenger - life with the gods of Africa, Graz City Museum
- 2016: Between the Sweet Water and the Swarm of Bees: A Collection of Works by Susanne Wenger, The Michael C. Carlos Museum at Emory University, Atlanta, GA
