= Jimoh Buraimoh =

Nigerian artist

Chief Jimoh Buraimoh (born 1943, as Jimoh Adetunji Buraimoh) is a Nigerian painter and artist. Chief Buraimoh is one of the most influential artists to emerge from the 1960s workshops conducted by Ulli Beier and Georgina Beier in Osogbo, Osun State, Nigeria. Since then, he has become one of the best known artists from Osogbo.

== Early life and education ==
Jimoh Buraimoh was born in Osogbo, Osun State, Nigeria, in 1943 into a Muslim branch of the royal family of the town. He attended the 1960s' workshops conducted by Ulli Beier, and was also a lighting technician in Duro Ladipo's theatre.

== Career ==
Jimoh Buraimoh's work merges western media and Yoruba style motifs. He is credited with being Africa's first head painter when in 1964, he made a contemporary art form inspired by the Yoruba tradition of incorporating beadwork designs into ceremonial fabrics and beaded crowns. In 1972, he represented Nigeria in the First All African Trade Fair in Nairobi, Kenya. One of his famous paintings was presented at the World Festival of Black Arts, Festac '77. He was the first Nigerian to be awarded a membership in the Contemporary World Association of Mosaic Artists.

== Work ==
Jimoh Buraimoh's works have been exhibited both at home and abroad.

== Teaching ==
Jimoh Buraimoh is also an efficient teaching artist. In 1974, he taught at the Haystack Mountain School of Crafts in Maine. He also taught at the University of Bloomington and other schools in New York, Boston and Los Angeles.

== Award ==
He was given the U.S. Exchange Alumni Lifetime Achievement Award to recognise his significant contributions to the arts and long-existing cultural relationship between Nigeria and the U.S.

== Sources and references ==
- Jimoh Buraimoh's website
- Jimoh Adetunji Buraimoh, "The Heritage: My Life and Arts", Lagos: Spectrum Books, Ltd, 2000. ISBN 978-978-029-083-2
- African Contemporary | Art Gallery featuring Jimoh Buraimoh's work
