= Twins Seven Seven =

Nigerian artist (1944–2011)

- Born: Omoba Taiwo Olaniyi Oyewale-Toyeje Oyekale Osuntoki; 3 May 1944; Ogidi, Kogi State, Nigeria
- Died: 16 June 2011 (aged 67); Ibadan, Nigeria
- Occupations: Artist and musician
- Known for: Painting and sculpture
- Movement: Oshogbo school
- Spouse: Nike Davies-Okundaye (divorced)

Twins Seven Seven, born Omoba Taiwo Olaniyi Oyewale-Toyeje Oyelale Osuntoki (3 May 1944 – 16 June 2011), was a Nigerian painter, sculptor and musician. He was an itinerant singer and dancer before he began his career as an artist, first attending in 1964 an Mbari Mbayo workshop conducted by Ulli Beier and Georgina Beier in Osogbo. Twins Seven Seven went on to become one of the best known artists of the Osogbo School.

== Early life and education ==
He was born as Omoba Taiwo Olaniyi Oyewale-Toyeje Oyekale Osuntoki to a father, Aitoyeje, who was a Muslim from Ibadan, Oyo State, and a mother, Mary, who was a Christian from Ogidi, Kogi State, in Nigeria. The name by which he became known alludes to the fact that he was the only surviving child of seven sets of twins born to his mother, Nigeria having the world's highest twinning rate. His mother was instructed by a babalawo to drink water sacred to the river goddess Osun to ensure her child's survival. As a result, it was believed that Twins Seven Seven was a reincarnation of his great-grandfather, Osun-toki, whose name means "Osun is worthy of worship." As a child, he was often difficult to his mother, threatening to "go away" again to the spirit realm, so the babalawo would etch small incisions on his face with special medicine herbs to ensure his permanency in the physical realm. The etchings remained on his face into adulthood.

Twins Seven Seven's introduction to the arts was not through painting, but through dance at the age of 16, part of his inspiration for dance stemming from a Yoruba custom that stated that a woman who had birthed twins should dance throughout the streets for money, so Twins Seven Seven danced on his mother's behalf.

He attended primary and secondary school, as well as briefly attending a teachers' training college for one year, and although he achieved academic success in his examinations, he detested the structure of classrooms and grew stronger interests toward art and music.

After performing a show in Oshogbo at the Mbari Club, Twins Seven Seven encountered Ulli Beier, a German editor and scholar living there at the time, who with his wife Georgina Beier ran an artist workshop. The Oshogbo school prided itself as not being a place that taught artists, but rather provided opportunities to confirm the individual vision of the different artists. At the Beier workshop, Seven Seven was given basic tools and minimal instruction throughout his artistic processes. Through this, Seven Seven was able to create his own unique style of painting.

== Career and later life ==
Twins Seven Seven's work is influenced by traditional Yoruba mythology and culture, and creates a fantastic universe of humans, animals, plants and Yoruba gods. Visually, his work resembles Yoruba carvings in the segmentation, division and repetition of his compositions; conceptually, it reflects this influence in the emphasis on transformation and balance, as well as its embodiment of dualities such as the earthly and the spiritual, past and present, industry and agriculture. Early works such as Dreams of the Abiku Child (1967) make allusion to concepts or figures in Yoruba cosmology and mythology, such as the abiku (devil child), and the orisha Osun. However, Twins Seven Seven also described his work as "contemporary Yoruba traditional art", not only paying homage to the influence of his cultural background but also to noting his responsiveness to current events and the postcolonial experience.

Some of his early work was influenced by his reading a copy of Amos Tutuola's book My Life in the Bush of Ghosts that was gifted to him by Georgina Beier. However, as he progressed as an artist, Twins Seven Seven focused more on imagery based on Yoruba folklore and his own dreams.

He attempted to avoid exposing himself to other painters who could potentially influence his unique individual painting style. Upon his first visit to the United States, he refused to attend a Picasso show, stating: "No, I don't want to risk being influenced by anyone else. All I am doing is in me already. I am not going to sit down in a studio and learn to mix colors like an [sic] European painter."

In 1972, Twins Seven Seven taught in the US at Merced College in California and at the Haystack Mountain Crafts School, Deer Isle. He taught at the Ile Ife Black Humanitarian Center in North Philadelphia in the early 1970s along with Barbara Bullock and Charles Searles, whom he influenced.

He was in line to become King of Ibadan upon which he would be named Osuntoki II. However, he first had to become the head of his clan, Mogaji. When the old Mogaji died, Twins Seven Seven was elected by his family to take his place, but the coronation kept being pushed back, and he died before he could assume this position.

In July 1982, he survived a car crash — although an erroneous radio announcement of his death was made after he was pulled unconscious from the wrecked vehicle — and was subsequently given an artificial hip and confined to bed for 18 months.

In the 1990s his work appeared in major exhibitions in Spain, Finland, Mexico, the Netherlands, England, Germany, and the US. Around this time, he also bought land in the village of Sekola, planning to turn it into a Yoruba-themed park and tourist destination entitled "Paradise Resort," but it never came to fruition.

In 2000, he moved to Philadelphia, where he hoped to permanently settle, but he was robbed, evicted, and fired from multiple menial jobs. At this low point, George Jevremovic mounted an exhibition for him in 2005 for a generous amount of money and gave him a space to work. He worked here until 2008 when a lack of money prompted his return to Nigeria.

Honours he received included Nigerian chieftaincy titles, such as when in January 1996, he was named the Ekerin-Basorun and the Atunluto of Ibadan. In December 1996, he was named the Obatolu of Ogidi.

He was designated UNESCO Artist for Peace on 25 May 2005 "in recognition of his contribution to the promotion of dialogue and understanding among peoples, particularly in Africa and the African Diaspora".

Twins Seven Seven died aged 67 in Ibadan on 16 June 2011, following complications from a stroke.

Twins Seven Seven's work was included in the 2015 exhibition We Speak: Black Artists in Philadelphia, 1920s-1970s at the Woodmere Art Museum.

== Family ==
Twins Seven Seven's son is Teddy Tones, a nigerian singer, songwriter, multi-instrumentalist and fashion model. Twins Seven Seven's grandsons are Kénnèth Oláríbigbé, known professionally as Oratio The Sage, a fast rising musician, songwriter, actor, band leader and Multi-instrumentalist, and Azeez Ojulari, an edge rusher for the Philadelphia Eagles of the National Football League, and BJ Ojulari, an edge rusher for the Arizona Cardinals.

== Private collections ==
- Olivier Doria d'Angri (Rome/London)
- The Glendonwyn Collection (Madrid/Tenerife/Dubai)
- Patrick and Awele Okigbo (Abuja, Nigeria)
- John Douglas Marshall (Vienna, Austria)

== Discography ==
- Slang in Trance (Caravan of Dreams, 1986)

With Ronald Shannon Jackson

- Live at the Caravan of Dreams (Caravan of Dreams, 1986)

== Sources ==
Twins Seven-Seven, A Dreaming Life: An Autobiography of Chief Twins Seven-Seven, the Ekerin-Bashorun Atunluto of Ibadanland, Bayreuth: Bayreuth University Press, 1999. ISBN 978-3-927510-61-6

Adewale Christopher Oyewo & Oluwafunminiyi Wasiu Raheem, "Twins Seven-Seven: The Glocal Framing of an International Artist in Memorial Pages", International Journal of Current Research in the Humanities Journal, Vol. 27, No. 1 (2023): 259–272.
