= Ulli Beier =

German editor and scholar (1922–2011)

- Born: Horst Ulrich Beier; 30 July 1922; Glowitz, Weimar Germany
- Died: 3 April 2011 (aged 88); Sydney, Australia
- Other names: Obotunde Ijimere; M. Lovori
- Education: University of London
- Occupations: Writer, editor and scholar
- Known for: Founder of Black Orpheus magazine
- Notable work: Modern Poetry from Africa (1963)
- Spouses: Susanne Wenger, div. 1966; Georgina Betts

Chief Horst Ulrich Beier, commonly known as Ulli Beier (30 July 1922 – 3 April 2011), was a German editor, writer and scholar who had a pioneering role in developing the Western world's understanding of literature, drama and poetry in Nigeria, as well as in Papua New Guinea.

== Early life and education ==
Ulli Beier was born to a Jewish family in Glowitz, Weimar Germany (modern Główczyce, Poland), in July 1922. His father was a medical doctor and an appreciator of art, who reared his son to embrace the arts. After the Nazi party's rise to power in the 1930s, his father was forced to close his medical practice. The Beiers, who were non-practising Jews, left for Palestine.

In Palestine, while his family were briefly detained as enemy aliens by the British authorities, Beier earned a BA as an external student from the University of London. He later moved to London, England, to earn a graduate degree in Phonetics. He found veterans were being given precedence in academic jobs and searched widely for a position.

== Marriage and family ==
He married the Austrian artist Susanne Wenger. In 1950, they both moved to Nigeria, where Beier had been hired at the University of Ibadan to teach Phonetics. The couple divorced in 1966.

Beier married the artist Georgina Betts, an Englishwoman from London who was working in Nigeria. In 1966, when the civil war broke out between Biafra and the federal government, they left the country and moved to Papua New Guinea.

== Career ==
While at the university, Beier transferred from the Phonetics department to the Extra-Mural Studies department. There he became interested in traditional Yoruba culture and arts. Though a teacher at Ibadan, he ventured beyond it, living in the cities of Ede, Ilobu and Osogbo, to learn more about the Yoruba communities. Due to his subsequent anthropological work among the members of the clans that are native to these places, he was awarded Yoruba honorary chieftaincies. In 1956, after visiting the First Congress of Black Writers and Artists in Paris, France, organized by Présence Africaine at the Sorbonne, Beier returned to Ibadan with more ideas.

In 1957, he founded the magazine Black Orpheus. Its name was inspired by "Orphée Noir", an essay by the French intellectual Jean-Paul Sartre. The first African literary journal in English, Black Orpheus quickly became the leading venue for publishing contemporary Nigerian authors. It became known for its innovative works and literary excellence, and was widely acclaimed. Later in 1961, Beier co-founded the Mbari Artists and Writers Club, Ibadan, a place for new writers, dramatists and artists, to meet and perform their work. Among the young writers involved with it in the exciting early years of Nigerian independence were Chinua Achebe and Wole Soyinka. In 1962, with the dramatist Duro Ladipo, he co-founded Mbari Mbayo (the Mbari Club), Osogbo.

Beier was also known for his work in translating traditional Nigerian literary works into English. He translated the plays of such Nigerian dramatists as Duro Ladipo and published Modern Poetry (1963), an anthology of African poems. He also wrote his own plays, published under the name "Obotunde Ijimere". Writing as Obotunde Ijimere (and later as M. Lovori), Beier masqueraded as Nigerian and Papua New Guinean. While mimicking the indigenous writers of those places, Beier also criticized other white people and cultures for imitating indigenous ones. He later claimed that his Ijimere writing "just 'happened'", but Beier actively sought to write under the identities of his alter egos.

In 1966, he and his second wife, the artist Georgina Betts, left Nigeria during the civil war to work in Papua New Guinea. Beier intermittently returned to Nigeria for brief periods. While in Papua New Guinea, he fostered budding writers at the University of Papua New Guinea, and his wife Georgina Beier continued the work she had been doing in Nigeria, recognising and encouraging New Guineans in their visual art.

Beier found international venues for taking the native artwork to the world. In New Guinea, he founded the literary periodical Kovave: A Journal of New Guinea Literature. It also carried reproductions of works by Papua New Guinean artists, including Timothy Akis and Mathias Kauage. His efforts have been described as significant in facilitating the emergence of Papua New Guinean literature. While in Papua New Guinea, Beier encouraged Albert Maori Kiki to record his autobiography, which Beier transcribed and edited. The book, Ten Thousand Years in a Lifetime, was published in 1968. In 1967 he began the Papua Pocket Poets (PPP) book series. While at UPNG Beier also wrote plays under a Papua New Guinean name. Beginning in 1971 he edited the Pacific Writers Series (Jacaranda Press, Brisbane). He and Georgina collaborated with Paul Cox, then visiting PNG for the second time, on Home of Man: The People of New Guinea (1971) which Cox illustrated with photographs the poetry written by Beier's students. Beier returned to Nigeria in 1971 to teach at Institute of African Studies, University of Ife, Ile-Ife (now Obafemi Awolowo University). Beier remained in post for three years, during which time he published the Pan African Pocket Poets series.

In the early 1980s, Beier returned for a time to Germany, where he founded and directed the Iwalewa Haus, an art centre at the University of Bayreuth.

Beier lived in Sydney, Australia, with his wife Georgina Beier. He was interviewed in 1977 by Hazel de Berg on his career and life, and once again in 2009 by Jon Ritchie about Australians in Papua New Guinea.The recording of these can be found at the National Library of Australia.

He died at home in the Annandale neighborhood, at the age of 88, on 3 April 2011.

== Popular culture ==
Ulli Beier makes a guest appearance in the novel Eteka: Rise of the Imamba in the Bandung chapter, as a mentor to the fictional character Oladele.

== Published works ==
- "A Year of Sacred Festivals in One Yoruba Town", Nigeria Magazine, Lagos, Nigeria: Marina, 1959.
- The Moon Cannot Fight: Yoruba Children's Poems, Ibadan: Mbari Publications, [1960s?]. Jointly compiled and translated by Ulli Beier and Bakare Gbadamosi. Illustrations by Georgina Betts.
- African Mud Sculpture, Cambridge University Press, 1963.
- Modern Poetry from Africa, Harmondsworth: Penguin Books, 1963 (Penguin African Library, AP7). Joint editor with Gerald Moore. **Revised as The Penguin Book of Modern African Poetry, Harmondsworth: Penguin Books, 1984.
- Black Orpheus: An Anthology of New African and Afro-American Stories, New York: McGraw-Hill Book Co., 1965.
- The Origin of Life and Death: African Creation Myths, London: Heinemann Educational Books, 1966 (African Writers Series, 22). Ulli Beier, ed.
- Ta Aroa: Poems from the Pacific, Port Moresby: Papua Pocket Poets, 1967. Collected by Eckehart von Sydow. Translated by Ulli Beier.
- Pantun: Malay Folk Poetry, Port Moresby: Papua Pocket Poets, 1967. Collected by Hans Nevermann. Translated by Ulli Beier.
- Ijala: Animal Songs by Yoruba Hunters, Port Moresby: Papua Pocket Poets, 1967.
- Python: Ibo Poetry, Port Moresby: Papua Pocket Poets, 1967. Translations by Chinua Achebe, Clement Agunwa, Ulli Beier, Romanus Egudu and E. C. C. Uzodinma.
- Not Even God Is Ripe Enough: Yoruba Stories, London and Ibadan: Heinemann Educational Books, 1968 (African Writers Series, 48). Jointly compiled and translated from the Yoruba by Ulli Beier and Bakare Gbadamosi.
- Contemporary Art in Africa, London: Pall Mall Press, 1968; published in German as Neue Kunst in Afrika: Das Buch zur Austellung, Berlin, Reimer, 1980.
- Political Spider: An Anthology of Stories from "Black Orpheus", London: Heinemann Educational Books, 1969 (African Writers Series, 58). Ulli Beier, ed.
- Voices of Independence: New Black Writing from Papua New Guinea, New York: St. Martin's Press, 1980. 251 pp.
- Thirty Years of Oshogbo Art, Bayreuth: Iwalewa House, 1991.
