= Ghanaian film poster =

Hand-painted advertising poster in Ghana

A Ghanaian film poster is a film poster hand-painted in Ghana used to advertise films produced in Ghana as well as world cinema. Ghanaian film posters, particularly hand-painted posters from the 1980s and 1990s, have become noted for their imaginative and unique artistry. They have been exhibited around the world in galleries and museums in Los Angeles, New York, Hong Kong, San Francisco, Chicago, and across Europe.

== History ==
In the 1980s, thanks to the invention of video recorders, the first small cinemas came up in the Greater Accra Region in Ghana. In those years the cinemas were often mobile. Their operators used to travel in the whole region with a selection of movie cassettes, a TV set, a VCR, and a generator, going from one village to the next to show their films. To draw attention to their performances, they announced them with colorful hand-painted movie posters, often painted on recycled flour sacks. These poster paintings were provided by the local film distributors who collaborated with commissioned artists and sign painters like Alex Boateng, Leonardo, Africatta, Muslim, Death is Wonder, Joe Mensah, D.A. Jasper, Stoger, Heavy J, Lawson Chindayen, Bright Obeng, Dan Nyenkumah, Sammy Mensah, and others, who crafted unique images to attract crowds into mobile cinema houses.

=== Golden age posters (mid 1980s–2000) ===
Since Ghanaians now buy or rent their films or prefer to watch them at home, and with the arrival of digital print technology to Ghana around 2000, the hand-painted movie poster tradition forever changed. The time period from the mid 1980s to the late 1990s is therefore viewed as the Golden Age of Ghanaian Movie Posters when the tradition was its most robust and authentic . Most of the movie houses have had to close in the recent years, and the few that are left can barely afford hand-painted movie posters, using printed ones instead. Therefore, in the Region of Greater Accra, there are hardly any cinemas left that still use hand painted movie posters. Many artists who used to work for the film distributors have turned to other tasks. They are painting street signs that are still very popular in Ghana, and in the Greater Accra Region some are also assisting other artists like Paa Joe or Kudjoe Affutu in painting their figurative coffins, palanquins and small sculptures. Some sign painters, such as Heavy J., Moses, Jasper, Farkira or Leonardo also work for the international art market, where Ghanaian movie posters as well as the figurative coffins are shown in exhibitions of contemporary African art where they are receiving more and more attention.

=== Contemporary and commissioned posters (2001–current) ===
After the year 2000 and the publication of Extreme Canvas, Ghanaian movie posters began to be exhibited worldwide as high art at galleries. At the same time, the mobile cinema business changed so that local audiences would more often watch movies at home and movie houses would use much cheaper mass-producible digital ads for movies. With the new international market for Ghanaian movie posters, some film poster painters continued to paint not for Ghanaian audiences, but for the international art market, while others retired from the tradition entirely.

In the 2010s, there emerged a market for commissioned posters through the internet and social media, largely through the efforts of Deadly Prey Gallery in Chicago. Deadly Prey commissions posters requested by fans to be painted by artists in Ghana. Some of the commissioned artists are original artists of the tradition from before 2000, while others are newer to the genre. These newer posters have an increased emphasis on lurid, gory, and often comical representations of American cinema and TV, from Star Wars to Mrs. Doubtfire to Curb Your Enthusiasm. Contemporary commissioned posters often feature violence, dismemberment, and horror in movies in which these elements do not originally appear.

== Stylistic influences ==
=== Origins as sign painters ===
The artists and sign painters looked first at the films that were mostly made in Ghana or Nigeria, and then developed their film poster. For the mobile cinemas, these works had to be sturdy, cheap to produce, and light in weight because the cinema operators had to move around with the material. Therefore, the artists used a cheap, but very durable cotton canvas underlay which they gained from Ghanaian flour sacks. This tightly woven cloth adhered very well with their oil and acrylic paints so that posters could even be hung outdoors when it rained. With their bright colors and an iconography adapted to the Ghanaian audiences, these paintings immediately caught the attention of the people and made them much more likely to go to the cinema than the normal posters that were printed in Nigeria.

=== Coastal style ===
By the coast in Accra, there emerged a more detail-driven style pioneered by Joe Mensah, Alex Boateng, Leonardo, Death is Wonder, and others. This style often highlights rippling musculature and clothing, as well as extravagant background images and explosions.

=== Kumasi style ===
More inland, in the central region of Ghana, Kumasi, a separate hand-painted 'airbrush' style emerged. Practitioners of this style such as Africatta, Babs, and Kwaku painted lines and figures as if they were airbrush painted to emphasize more macro-size details.

== Exhibitions ==
- 2005. Killers op canvas , Affichemuseum Horn, The Netherlands.
- 2011. Movie posters from Ghana , Pinakothek der Moderne, Munich.
- 2011/12. 'Miracles of Africa', Hämeenlinna Art Museum, Hämeenlinna and Oulu Museum of Art, Grandma, Finland.
- 2012/13. Hors-champs , Musée d'Ethnographie de Neuchâtel (MEN), Switzerland.
- 2013. Les Hors-champs de l'affiche , Musée d'Ethnographie de Neuchâtel (MEN), Switzerland.
- 2016. KUNG FU IN AFRICA: Golden Age Hand-Painted Movie Posters from Ghana (1985-1999). Hanart TZ Gallery. Hong Kong.
- 2019/20 Hand-Painted Movie Posters from Ghana, Poster House, New York City

== Publications ==
- Wolfe, Ernie III (2000): Extreme Canvas: Hand-painted Movie Posters from Ghana , Los Angeles: Dilettante Press / Kesho Press.
- Wolfe, Ernie III (2012): Extreme Canvas 2. The Golden Age of Hand-painted Movie Posters from Ghana. Los Angeles: Dilettante Press / Kesho Press.
- Tschumi, Regula (2013): Hors-champs: genèse de l'affiche de l'exposition in: Gonseth Marc-Olivier et al. (ed.), Hors-champs. Eclats du patrimoine culturel immatériel. , Musée d'Ethnographie Neuchâtel MNM, Neuchâtel: Atelier PréTexte, pp. 216–227.
- Gilbert, Michelle (2003): 'Shocking Images: Ghanaian Painted Posters', in: Musée Dapper (ed.), Ghana Yesterday and Today. Paris: Edition Dapper, pp. 353–379.
- Wendl, Tobias (2004): Filmplakate aus Ghana, in: . In Kramer & W. Schmidt (eds.), Plakate in Afrika. Frankfurt a.M., pp. 77–81.
- Wendl, Tobias (2002): Try me! Advertising and Visual Culture in Africa , in: Wendl, Tobias, (ed.), African Advertising Art. Wuppertal: Peter Hammer, pp. 12–27.
