= Theophilus Nii Anum Sowah =

Ghanaian figurative palanquin

- Born: Theophilus; 1968 (age 57–58)
- Citizenship: Ghana
- Occupation: Artist

Theophilus Nii Anum Sowah (born 1968) is a Ghanaian figurative palanquin and fantasy coffin artist. Nii Anum was the chief apprentice in the Kane Kwei Carpentry Workshop where he worked ahead of other artists like Paa Joe.

Ever since Kane Kwei's death in 1992, Nii Anum has run his own workshop based in Accra. His work has spanned from the more conventional forms, such as cars, fish, and vegetables to more creative forms including political messages, pop culture iconography, and biblical creatures of the apocalypse. His works have been exhibited in galleries and museums around the world.
