= Ataa Oko =

Ghanaian coffin artist (c.1919–2012)

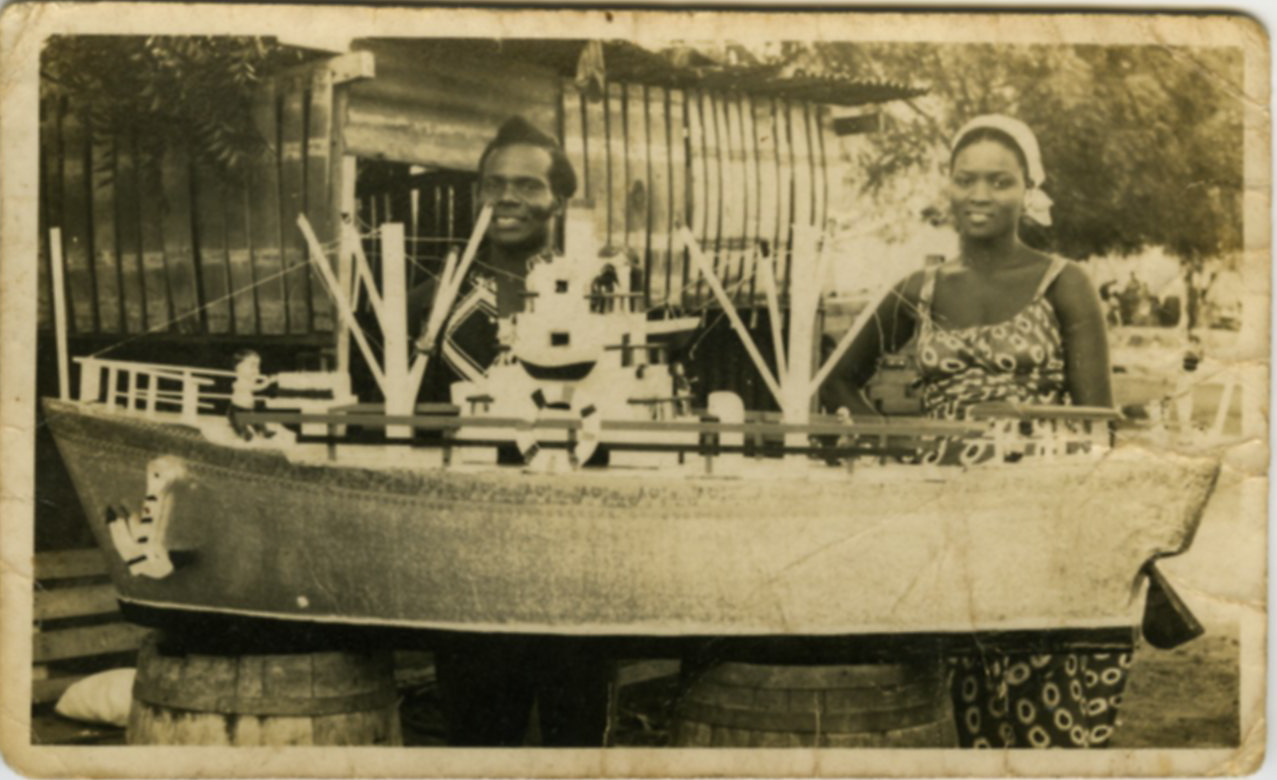
Ataa Oko and his third wife, with a coffin in the form of a battleship, about 1960

Ataa Oko Addo (c. 1919 – 9 December 2012) was a Ghanaian builder of figurative palanquins and figurative coffins, and at over 80 years of age he became a painter of Art Brut.

== Biography ==
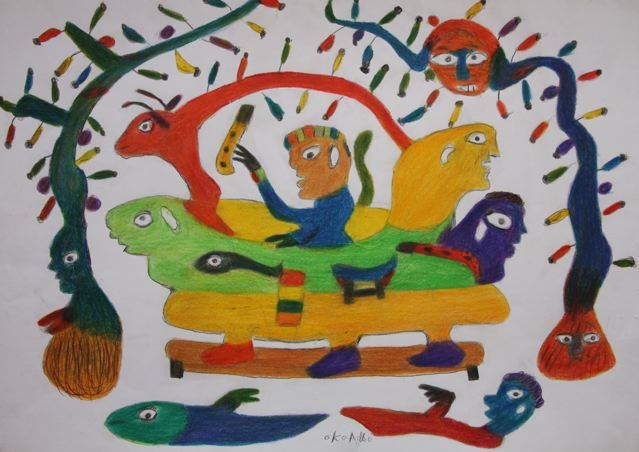
Figurative palanquin, drawing of Ataa Oko 2010

Ataa Oko Addo, called Ataa Oko, was born around 1919 in the coastal town of La, Ghana. He never went to school, but worked since he was about 13 years old as a fisherman. Later his family sent him on the cocoa plantations in the Ashante Region. From 1936 to 1939 he was trained as a carpenter in Accra. From 1939 to 1970 he worked in numerous temporary employments.

According to Regula Tschumi, Ataa Oko started to build figurative coffins around 1945. He had been inspired by the figurative palanquins he had seen in Accra. These palanquins were used by the Ga chiefs already at the beginning of the 20th century. The palanquins were built in the form of the respective family symbols which the Ga chiefs were using. Around 1960 Ataa Oko opened his own coffin and palanquin workshop in La.

The last years of his life, Ataa Oko was retired and hardly built coffins any more. Around 2005 the former carpenter started to draw. His graphic art practice was born as a result of his meeting with Regula Tschumi who was making a research about the figurative coffins of the Ga. Looking for information about this art form the ethnologist asked Ataa Oko to draw his former works he had made some 50 years ago. Ataa Oko's graphic work developed continuously. When he died in 2012, he left behind a comprehensive body of work that give a fascinating insight not only into the life of the artist, but also into the religious life and culture of the Ga people.

Ataa Oko's coffins and drawings were first exhibited in the group show "Six Feet Under" at the Kunstmuseum Berne 2006 and 2010/11 he had first one-man show in the well known Collection de l'art brut in Lausanne.

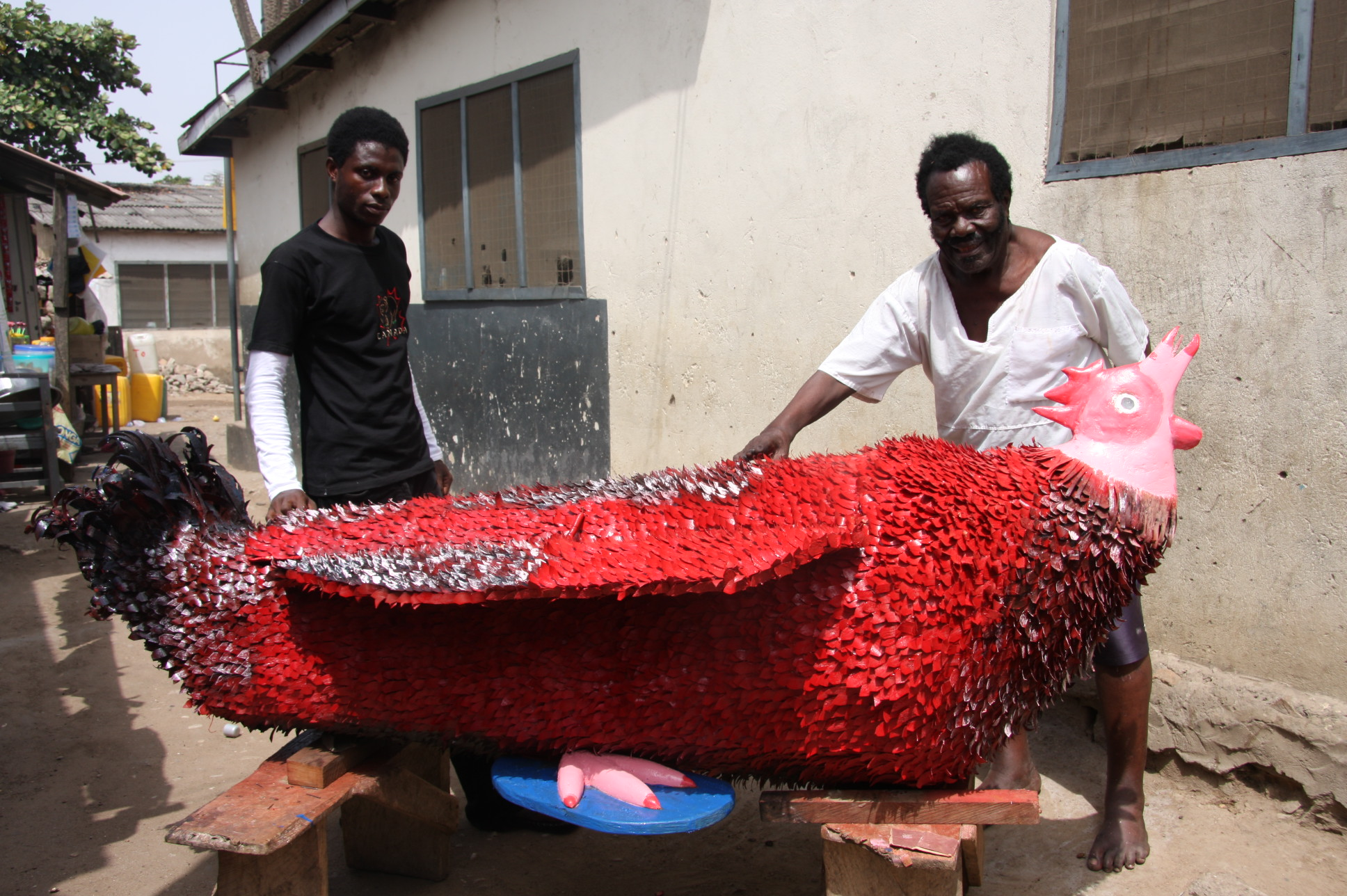
Ataa Oko and Kudjoe Affutu with Okos red rooster coffin 2009

== Single and group exhibitions ==
- 2025. Musée International de la Réforme, Geneva: Voir l'invisible.
- 2024/25. Museo delle Culture, Milan: Dubuffet e l'art brut - L'arte degli outsider.
- 2023. Centre d’Art Contemporain, Geneva: Crysalide. Le rêve du Papillon.
- 2022. Museum der Völker, Schwaz: Die Geister spielen Fussball. Zeichnungen und Skulpturen des ghanaischen Künstlers Ataa Oko Addo (1919-2012).
- 2022. Collection de l'Art Brut, Lausanne: Croyances, 5th Art Brut Biennale in the CAB Lausanne.
- 2020. Kunsthalle Hamburg, Hamburg: Mourning. On Loss and Change.
- 2017/18. Collection de l'art brut, Lausanne: Corps, 3rd Art Brut Biennale in the CAB Lausanne.
- 2017. ANO Gallery of Nana Oforiatta Ayim in Accra: "Accra: Portraits of A City".
- 2014. MUT Museum of the University Tübingen: "Diesseits-Jenseits-Abseits".
- 2012. MEN Musée ethnographique Neuchâtel Hors-Champs.
- 2011/12. Miracles of Africa, Hämeenlinna Art Museum, Hämeenlinna and Oulu Museum of Art, Oma, Finland
- 2011. Sainsbury Centre for Visual Arts, University of East Anglia, Norwich. Ghanaian 'fantasy coffin', 27 September 2011 - 4 December 2011. Griff Rhys Jones.
- 2010/11. Collection de l'art brut, Lausanne. One-man show Ataa Oko et les Esprits.
- 2006 and 2007/2008. Art Museum Berne and Hygienemuseum Dresden. Exposition Six Feet Under: Autopsy of Our Relation to the Dead .

== Gallery ==
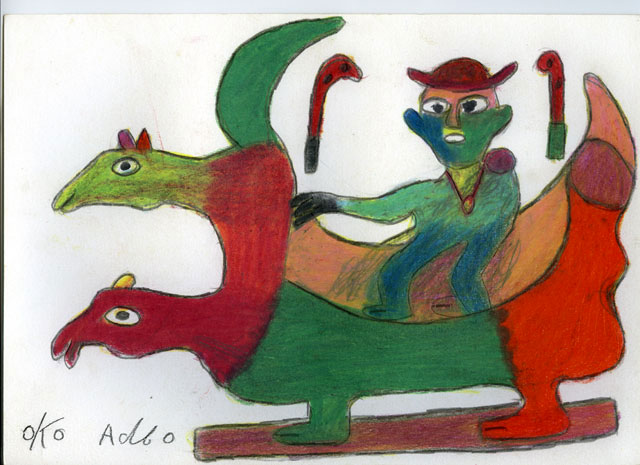
Figurative palanquin, drawing of Ataa Oko 2009

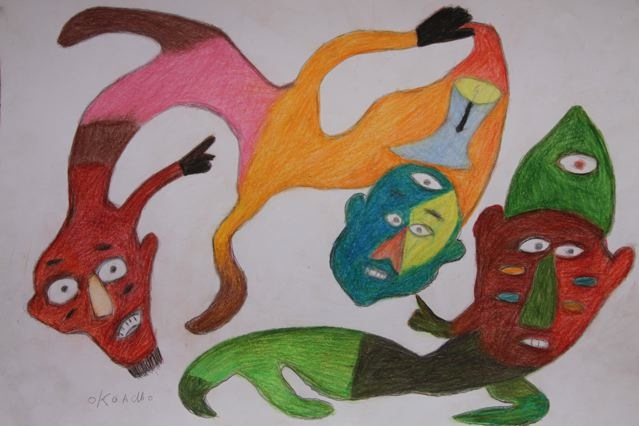
Spirits, drawing of Ataa Oko 2010

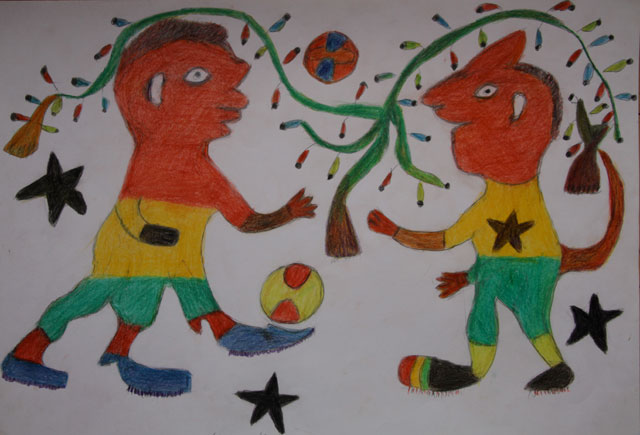
World cup, drawing of Ataa Oko 2010

== Media ==
- 2023. Andrea Bellini (ed.): Chrysalide. Le rêve du pappillon, Exhibition cat. Centre d'Art Contemporain Geneva, Lenz 2023 (french).
- 2022. Brigitte Kölle (ed.): Trauern. Klaus Wagenbach (german), p. 68-73.
- 2022. Collection de l'Art Brut (ed.): Croyances. 5th Art Brut Biennale in the CAB Lausanne, french, p. 104-5, 156-57, 2022.
- 2021. Regula Tschumi (ed.): Ataa Oko Addo. With text contributions by Sarah Lombardi, Lucienne Peiry, Regula Tschumi and Atta Kwami, Edition Clandestin, Biel, ISBN 978-3-907262-05-4.
- 2017. Lucienne Peiry, The Flute of Ataa Oko, en: Outsider Art, Vol. 3, Shanghai University Press, p. 22-33, Anglais e Chinois. ISBN 978-7-5671-2640-4/J 399.
- 2017. Regula Tschumi, Ataa Oko. A glimpse inside the amazing world of Ghanaian funerals and how the carpenter Ataa Oko became an artist, online magazine Interwoven: the fabric of things.
- 2014. Regula Tschumi: Concealed Art. The figurative palanquins and coffins of Ghana. Edition Till Schaap, Berne. ISBN 978-3-03828-099-6.
- 2014. Regula Tschumi: The buried treasures of the Ga: Coffin art in Ghana. Edition Till Schaap, Bern. ISBN 9783038280163. A revised and updated second edition of "The buried treasures of the Ga", Bern: Benteli 2008.
- 2013. Regula Tschumi "The Figurative Palanquins of the Ga. History and Significance", en: African Arts, Vol. 46, Nr. 4, 2013, pp. 60–73.
- 2012/13. Hors-Champs. Ed. Musée d'Ethnographie Neuchâtel MEN. Neuchâtel: Atélier PréTexte, pp. 200–203, (français).
- 2012. "Collection de l'Art Brut, Lausanne", Lucienne Peiry (ed.), Skira Flammarion 2012, pp. 26–27; 164. (français)
- 2010. Ataa Oko. Exhibition catalogue. ed. Collection de l'art brut. Gollion: Infolio. (français).
- 2006. Regula Tschumi, "Last Respects, First Honoured. Ghanaian Burial Rituals and Figural Coffins" in: Kunstmuseum Bern (ed.), Six Feet Under. Autopsy of Our Relation to the Dead. Ex.-Cat. Bielefeld, Leipzig: Kerber, pp. 114–125.

== Film, video ==
- 2010. Ataa Oko and the spirits. Philippe Lespinasse, Regula Tschumi, Andress Alvarez. Lausanne/Le Tourne, Parti de l’Art Brut/ LoKomotiv Films, 20 minutes, (subtitled).
- 2009. Sépulture sur mesure, 52 minutes movie on the work of the Ga funerals, of the coffins of Ataa Oko Ado and Eric Adjetey Anang (Kane Kwei Carpentry Workshop). Philippe Lespinasse, Grand Angle Production.

== See also ==
- Art Brut
- African Art
- Contemporary African Art
- Ataa Oko. A glimpse inside the amazing world of Ghanaian funerals and how the carpenter Ataa Oko became an artist
