= Lewis Smith =

Lewis Smith may refer to:

- Lewis Smith (baseball) (1858–?), American baseball player in one game, 1882
- Lewis Smith (politician) (1880–1950), Canadian politician
- Lewis Smith (artist) (1907–1998), outsider art artist
- Lewis Smith (cricketer) (1913–1978), English cricketer
- Lewis Smith (actor) (born 1956), American actor
- Lewis Smith (footballer) (born 2000), Scottish footballer
- Lewis Smith (runner), winner of the 600 yards at the 1943 USA Indoor Track and Field Championships
- Lewis A. Smith, American polo player
- Lewis Arthur Smith (1869–1958), American architect
- Lewis Worthington Smith (1866–1947), American professor and writer
- Bull Smith (Lewis Oscar Smith, 1880–1928), baseball player

== See also ==
- Louis Smith (disambiguation)
