= Kane Kwei Carpentry Workshop =

Woodwork shop in Teshie, Ghana

Coordinates: 5.587742°N 0.099610°W

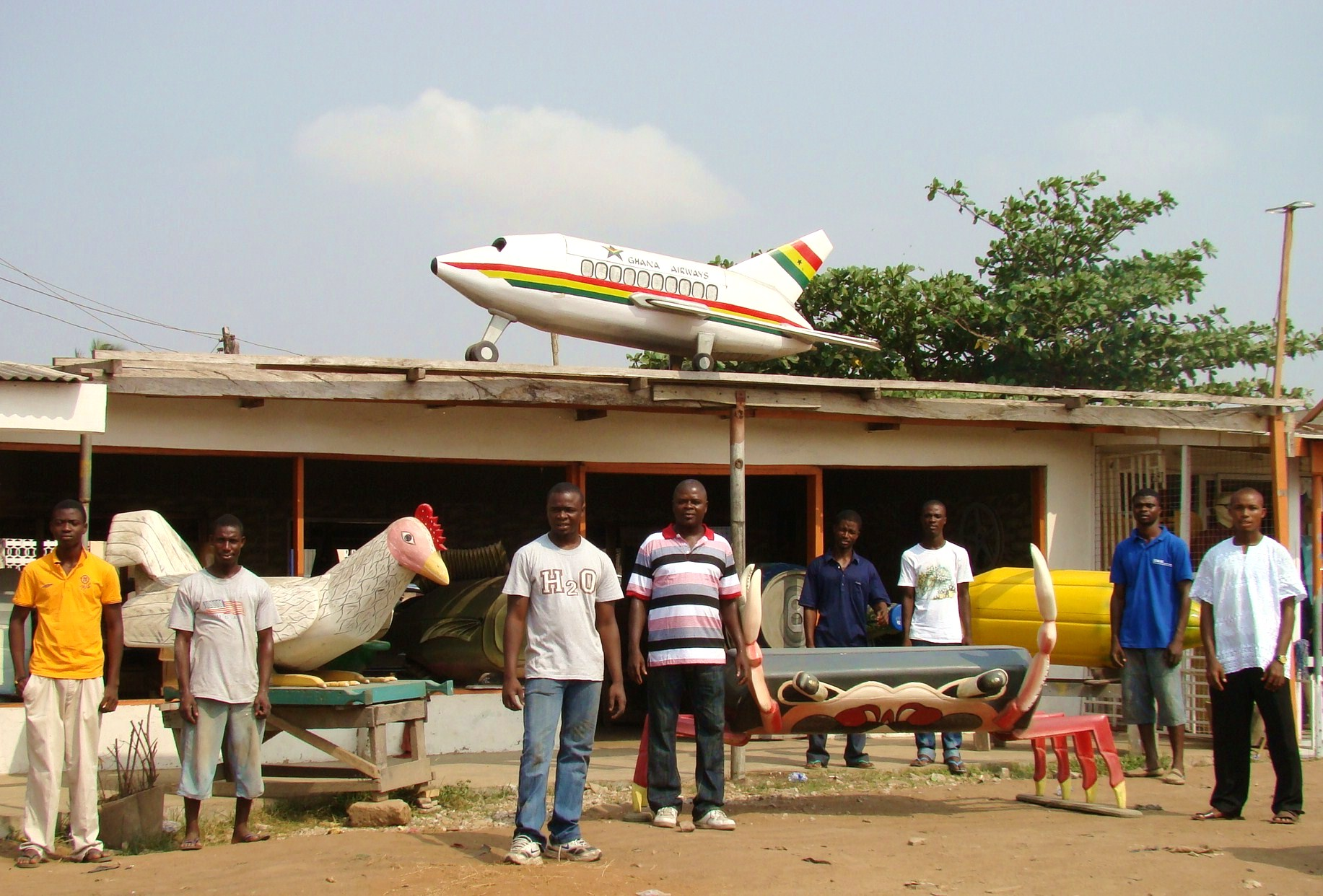
The Kane Kwei Carpentry Workshop

The Kane Kwei Carpentry Workshop is a studio established in Teshie, Ghana, since the 1950s. It is known for its design coffins that became symbolic of African artistic creativity. It featured the talents of several artists who would go on to gain fame as fantasy coffin sculptors, including Paa Joe, Kane Kwei, Eric Kwei, Cedi Kwei, and the leader of the shop at Kane Kwei's death, Theophilius Nii Anum Sowah.

== History ==
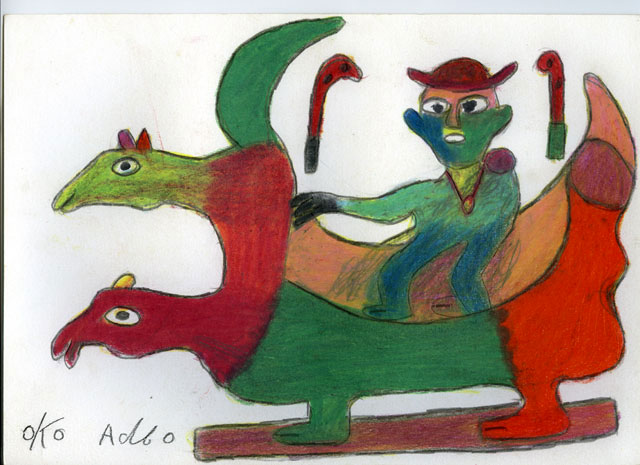
Figurative palanquin; drawing by the coffin- and palanquin builder Ataa Oko (1918–2012) from Ghana

Seth Kane Kwei (1922–1992) was a Ga carpenter joiner established in Teshie, in the suburbs of Accra in Ghana. He was a long time considered to be the inventor in the early 1950s of design coffins or fantasy coffins, called Abebuu adekai ("boxes with proverbs") by the Ga people, the dominant ethnic group of the region of Accra. Though, an anthropologist recently published a different story of the origin of the coffins.

As the anthropologist Regula Tschumi recently wrote, the figurative coffins developed out of the figurative palanquins which were formerly used like the figurative coffins in Accra only by the traditional chiefs. Around 1960 the use of figurative coffins for Ga burial rites became widespread. Design coffins are acknowledged as symbolic of contemporary creation in Africa.

At the death of Kane Kwei, his son Sowah took over the workshop, then Cedi – Kane Kwei's younger child – after the death of Sowah in 1999. Since 2005, Eric Adjetey Anang (born 1985, the son of Cedi) has been attempting to revitalize the creativity of the studio by the introduction of new models, the creation of furniture realized in the same spirit and using the same techniques as for the coffins.

About ten carpenters' workshops established in Teshie and in the region of Accra produce similar coffins. Some of their masters are like Paa Joe and Tei in Dorwanya former apprentices of Seth Kane Kwei. Others were trained by Kane Kwei's successors, mainly by Paa Joe. Among them are Daniel Mensah called Hello in Teshie, Tetteh in Amasaman and Tetteh Red in Ningo, Kudjoe Affutu in Awutu, Central Region, and Eric Kpakpo in La.

== The coffins ==
=== Manufacturing of the coffins ===
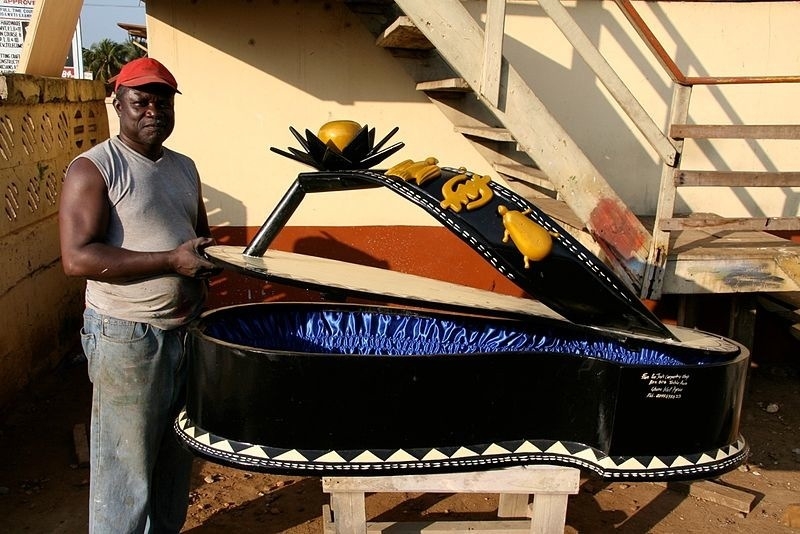
Kane Kweis former apprentice Paa Joe with a sandal coffin. Paa Joe and Kane Kwei were shown together in several group shows like in Les Magiciens de la Terre 1989 in the Centre Pompidou in Paris

The Kane Kwei workshop is deeply anchored in Ga tradition, both by the genesis of its productions, by protocols framing their local use, and by its functioning based on apprentices, who can number about ten. At the end of the apprenticeship, which lasts from two to five years, a traditional ceremony is organized. In this occasion, the apprentice has to pay a sum of money, donate alcoholic drinks, a parasol, a pair of sandals to the boss of the workshop, and then a certificate is handed to him.

The manufacturing process of coffin begins by the scrupulous observation of visual documents reproducing the proposed model, or even the actual model – that could be a live animal – followed by its being realised in three dimensions. Neither plans nor sketches are prerequisite to the manufacturing. After the coffin is built, the inside is coated with a lining. The outside is carefully polished, sprayed, and finally decorated by a painter.

Light wood as wawa (white wood) or emien is used for the coffins intended for funerals. Those coffins intended for export as artworks are made from harder and more expensive wood, such as limba or African Mahogany.

=== Coffins created by Kane Kwei Carpentry Workshop – selected list ===
Type	Subject
Animals	Antelope • Aulacode (Thryonomys swinderianus) • Cameleon • Catfish • Coq • Cow • Crab • Crayfish • Doberman dog • Dove • Eagle • Elephant • Hen • Lobster • Lion • Parrot • Peacock • Pig • Reindeer • Red fish • Sardine • Saw fish • Shark • Snail • Snake • Spider • Striped fish • Tilapia • Tuna • Turkey • Turtle • Whale
Buildings	Church • Danish traditional farm • Grocery shop • Two storey building
Fruits and vegetables	Banana • Carrot • Cocoa pod • Corn • Green pepper • Onion • Palm nut • Pineapple • Pumpkin • Red pepper • Sugar cane
Objects	9mm bullet • Asante stool • Ballpoint with notebook • Bass drum • Bible • Bottle of beer (Star) • Bottle of beer (Tuborg) • Bottle of Coca-Cola • Bottle of soju • Bottle of vodka (Beluga) • Bottle of vodka (Stolichnaya) • Can of Aquarius energy drink • Canned mackerels and tomato • Chief's scepter • Cigarette (London) • Cinema projector • Condom sachet • Crate of beer (Carsberg) • Falling tree • Fishing net • Flour bag • "Graphic" newspaper • Guitar • Hunting gun • I-Phone • Kalashnikov magazine • Lego brick • Machine gun • Matrioshka • Soccer shoe • Spaner • Traditional sword• Spoon • Sewing machine • Pot • Hammer • Maersk container • Microphone • Outboard engine • Piano • Plane • Ray Ban case • Referee whistle • Remote control (Philips) • Robot • Rocket toy • Saw • Syringe • Soccer ball • Smith's bellows • Talking drum • Tray of frozen food • Trowel • Wad of banknoates (Danish) • Wad of banknotes (Russian) • Windmill •
Vehicles	32 seats bus • Ambulance • Aircraft (Ghana Airways) • Aircraft (KLM) • Bedford truck • Canoe • Cruise ship • Fire truck • Fishing boat • Garbage truck • Luxury bus • Mercedes-Benz car saloon • Mercedes-Benz car (convertible) • Private jet • Toyota Corolla • Tractor • Volkswagen minibus • War tank
Others	Sun • Soccer field

== From burials in Ghana to international art market ==
=== Apparition of the studio's works on art market ===
While some figurative coffins were acquired in the 1970s by American gallery owners (Vivian Burns in 1973 and Ernie Wolfe, both from Los Angeles), it is since 1989 that these objects achieved international recognition as works of art, through their successive display in exhibitions: Magiciens de la terre (1989, Musée National d'Art Moderne (Centre Georges Pompidou) – Grande halle de la Villette, Paris – Curator Jean-Hubert Martin) and "Africa Explores" (1992, New Museum of Modern Art, New York – Curator Susan Vogel).

Pieces of the studio are part of major private collections including the Contemporary African Art Collection of Jean Pigozzi and many public collections.

At the initiative of the studio, artistic partnerships with Western institutions are implemented and residencies of foreign artists organized.

=== Selection of group exhibitions until 2005 ===
- 2005 "Arts of Africa", Grimaldi Forum, Monaco, France
- 2005 "African Art Now", Museum of Fine Art, Houston, USA
- 2005 "Sexualität und Tod – AIDS in der Zeitgenössischen Afrikanischen Kunst", RJM Museum, Cologne, Germany.
- 2003 "Ghana: hier et aujourd’hui / Ghana: Yesterday and today", Musée Dapper, Paris, France
- 2000 "Ein Fisch für die letzte Ruhe", Museum auf dem Ohlsdorfer Friedhof, Hamburg, Germany.
- 1998 "AFRICA Vibrant New Art from a Dynamic Continent", Tobu Museum of Art, Tokyo, Japan.
- 1998 "Samuel Kane Kwei", Museum of Contemporary and Modern Art, Geneva, Switzerland.
- 1997 "Wie das Leben, so der Sarg...Samuel Kane Kwei, Nam June Paik", Ifa Gallery, Bonn, Germany.
- 1996 "Neue Kunst aus Afrika", Haus der Kulturen der Welt, Berlin, Germany.
- 1995 Nam June Paik Recent Works, Benamou-Gravier Gallery, Paris, France. Kane Kwei works used by Nam June Paik.
- 1993 "Skizzen eines Projektes", Ludwig Forum für internationale Kunst, Aachen, Germany.
- 1991 "Africa Explores: 20th Century African Art", New Museum of Contemporary Art, New York, USA.
- 1989 "Magiciens de la Terre", National Museum of Contemporary Art – Georges Pompidou Center, La Grande Halle de la Villette, Paris, France.

== Films ==
- The Master of Coffins – 26 minutes documentary by Luis Nachbin / Matrioska Films for GloboTV (Brazil, 2013)
- Sépulture sur mesure. by Philippe Lespinasse / Grand Angle Production. (France, 2009).
- Les cercueils de Monsieur Kane Kwei, by Thierry Secretan, 1989.

== Bibliography ==
- Bonetti, Roberta, 2010. "Alternate Histories of the Abebuu Adekai", in: African Arts, Bd. Autumn 2010, S. 14–33.
- Bonetti 2009: Roberta Bonetti, "Abebuu adekai chez les Ga du Ghana. Un regard anthropologique sur l’image", in Histoire de l'art et anthropologie, Paris, coédition INHA / Musée du quai Branly («Les actes»), 2009.
- Bonetti 2009: Roberta Bonetti, "Absconding in plain sight. The Ghanaian Receptacles of Proverbs revisited", RES, 55/56, Spring-Autumn 2009.
- Bonetti 2008: Roberta Bonetti, "Antropologia di oggetti funerari tra arte, mercato e musei", Quaderni LEA (3) Bologne, Baiesi, 2008.
- Bonetti 2005: Roberta Bonetti, Artefacts in Transit, Laboratorio di Etno-Antropologia, (4) Bologne, Baiesi, 2005.
- Burns 1974: Vivian Burns, "Travel to Heaven: fantasy coffins". In African Arts, 7 (2), Winter 1974, pp. 24–25. Los Angeles.
- McClusky 2002: Pamela McClusky, "Riding into the next life: a Mercedes-Benz coffin", in Art from Africa: long steps never broke a back, pp. 244–51. Seattle: Seattle Art Museum in association with Lund Humphries, 2002.
- Quarcoopome 2003: Nii O. Quarcoopome, Majestueux départs vers l'au-delà = Majestic rides into the afterlife. In Ghana: hier et aujourd'hui (Ghana: Yesterday and today), pp. 261–83. Paris: Musée Dapper, 2003.
- Secrétan 1994: Thierry Secretan, Il fait sombre, va-t-en !, Paris, Editions Hazan, 1994.
- Soppelsa 1994: Robert T. Soppelsa. A life well lived : fantasy coffins of Kane Quaye, Gallery of Art, University of Missouri-Kansas City, September 23 – October 21, 1994. In African Arts, 28 (2) spring 1995, pp. 74–75. Los Angeles.
- Soulillou 1995: Jacques Soulillou. "The solubility of Ghanaian coffins in a cathodic milieu = De la solubilité des cercueils ghanéens en milieu cathodique". In Revue Noire, no. 16, mars-avril-mai 1995, pp. 88–89. Paris.
- Tschumi 2014: Regula Tschumi Concealed Art. The figurative Palanquins and Coffins of Ghana, Edition Till Schaap, 2014. ISBN 978-3-03828-099-6.
- Tschumi 2014: Regula Tschumi The Buried Treasures of the Ga. Coffin Art in Ghana, Edition Till Schaap, 2014. ISBN 978-3-03828-016-3.
- Tschumi 2013: Regula Tschumi The Figurative Palanquins of the Ga. History and Significance. In: African Arts, Vol. 46, Nr. 4, 2013, S. 60–73.
- Tschumi 2006: Regula Tschumi "Last Respects, First Honoured. Ghanaian Burial Rituals and Figural Coffins", in: Kunstmuseum Bern (Hrsg.): Six Feet Under. Autopsy of Our Relation to the Dead. Kerber, Bielefeld & Leipzig 2006, pp. 114–25. Deutsch: Die letzte Ehre kommt zuerst. Ghanaische Bestattungsrituale und figürliche Särge, pp. 114–25*.
- Tschumi 2004: Regula Tschumi, "A Report on Paa Joe and the Proverbial Coffins of Teshie and Nungua, Ghana", Africa et Mediterraneo, nos. 47–8, 2004, pp. 44–7.
- Vogel 1991: Susan Vogel. "New functional art: future traditions", in Africa Explores: 20th-century African art, pp. 94–113. New York: Center for African Art; Munich: Prestel-Verlag, 1991.
