= Daniel Mensah =

Ghanaian carpenter and artist

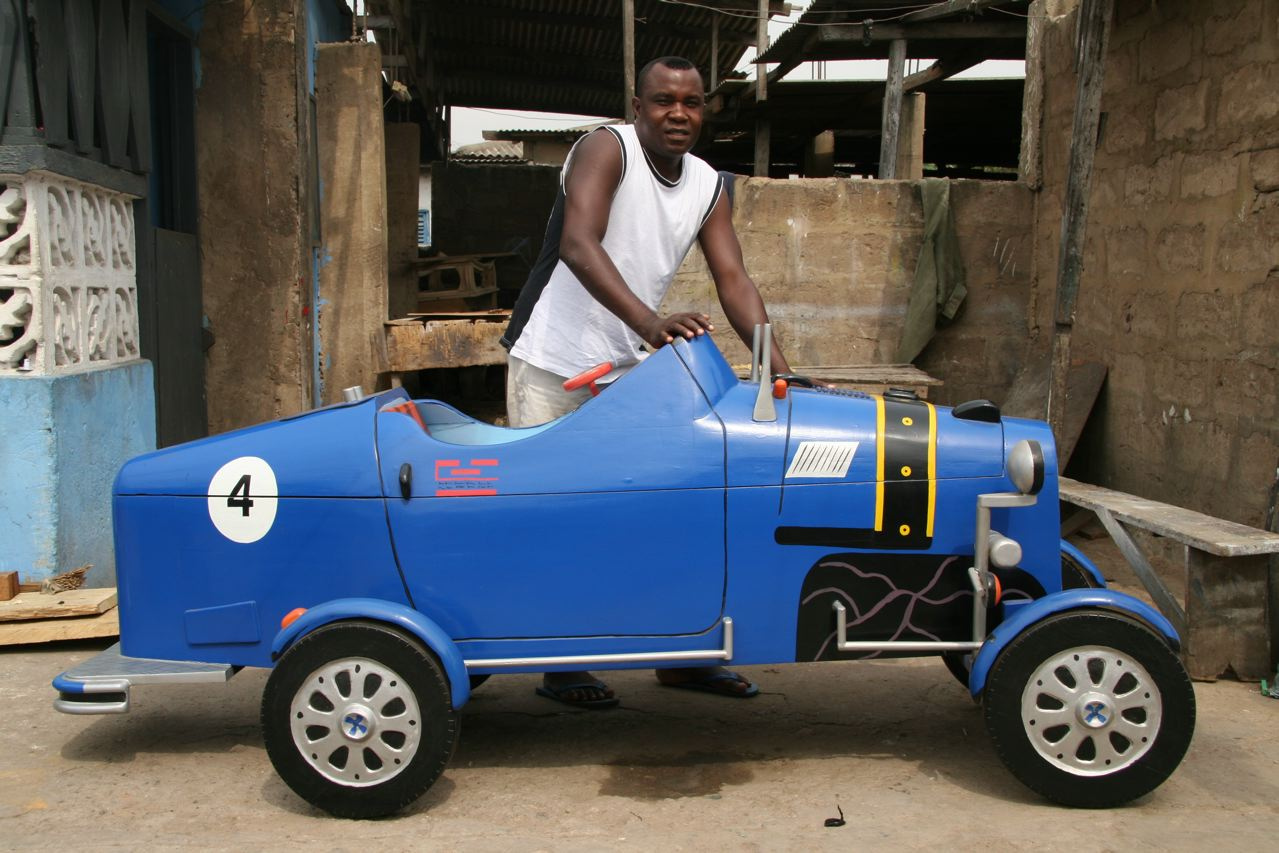
Daniel Mensah, 2006

Daniel Mensah (born 1968), also known as Hello, is a Ga carpenter and fantasy coffin artist. He works as an independent artist and carpenter in Teshie, Greater Accra, Ghana.

== Biography ==
Born in 1968 in Teshie, Daniel Mensah did his six-year apprenticeship from 1984 until 1990 with the Ga coffin artist Paa Joe who was trained by Kane Kwei (1924-1992) in Teshie. When Mensah finished his apprenticeship, he worked for eight years with Paa Joe in Nungua as a master carpenter until he opened his own studio in 1998 called "Hello Design Coffin Works" in Teshie. Mensah participated in various art exhibitions in Europe and in some European film projects, like "Sépulture sur mesure" from Philippe Lespinasse. Some of his fantasy coffins are in the collection of the British Museum in London, in the Sainsbury Centre for Visual Arts in Norwich and in private art collections.

== Exhibitions ==
- 2009–2010: Living and Dying Gallery, British Museum, London.
- 2011: "Ghanaian Fantasy Coffin“, Sainsbury Centre for Visual Arts, University of East Anglia, Norwich.

== Documentaries ==
- 2009 "Ghana, Sépulture sur mesure"; Philippe Lespinasse, Grand Angle Productions, TV5Monde.
- 2011 "Hidden Treasure of Africa“; Griff Rhys Jones, BBC.

== Bibliography ==
- Regula Tschumi. 2008. The Buried Treasures of the Ga. Coffin Art in Ghana. Benteli, pp. 122–123, 229.
