= Fantasy coffin =

Figurative coffins from Ghana

Fantasy coffins or figurative coffins, also called “FAVs” (fantastic afterlife vehicles) and custom, fantastic, or proverbial coffins (abebuu adekai), are functional coffins made by specialized carpenters in the Greater Accra Region of Ghana. These colorful objects, which developed out of figurative palanquins, are not only coffins but considered works of art. They were shown for the first time to a wider Western public in the exhibition Les Magiciens de la terre at the Musée National d'Art Moderne in Paris in 1989. The seven coffins shown in Paris were made by Kane Kwei (1922–1992) and his former assistant Paa Joe (b. 1947). Fantasy coffins gained fame in the United States after Ernie Wolfe III's exhibition of Kane Kwei's works at the Honolulu Museum of Art (1993), several shows at the Ernie Wolfe Gallery, and LACMA (1998). Since then, coffins by Kane Kwei, his grandson Eric Adjetey Anang, Paa Joe, Daniel Mensah, Kudjoe Affutu, Theophilus Nii Anum Sowah, Benezate, and other artists have been displayed in international art museums and galleries around the world.

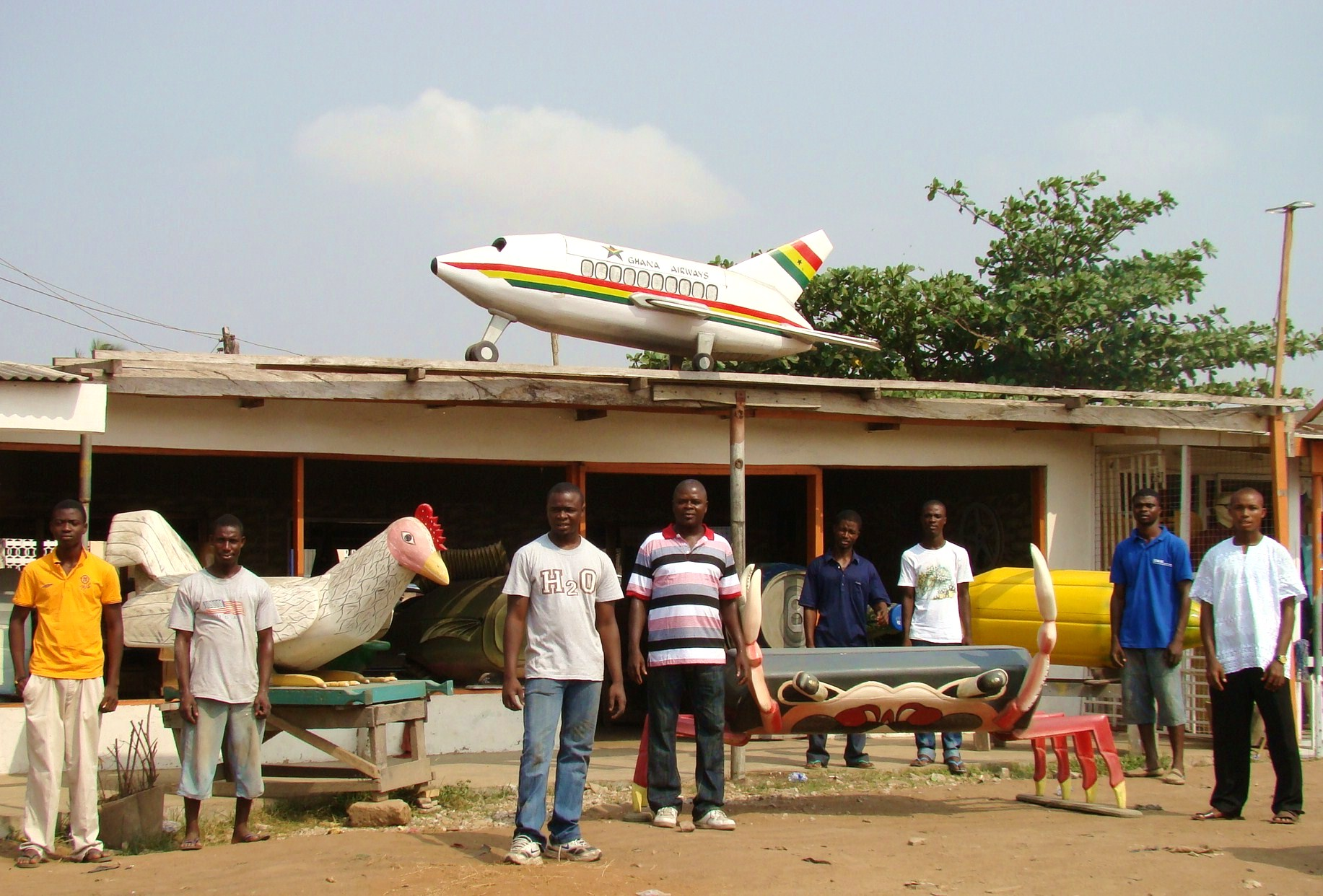
Eric Adjetey Anang and the Kane Kwei Carpentry Workshop with a variety of fantasy coffin designs, including a chicken, crab and airliner.

== Origin and meaning ==
Fantasy coffins are mainly used by the southern Ghana-based Ga people because of their religious beliefs regarding the afterlife. The Ga believe that life continues in the next world in the same way it did on earth. Ancestors are also considered much more powerful than the living and able to influence their relatives who are still alive, and the social status of the deceased depends in part on the use of an exclusive coffin during burial.

Fantasy coffins are only displayed on the day when they are buried with the deceased. They often symbolize the deceased person's profession. Certain shapes, such as a sword or stool, represent regal or priestly insignia with a magical and religious function. Only people with the appropriate status are allowed to be buried in such coffins. Animals such as lions, cockerels and crabs may be used to represent clan totems. Similarly, only the heads of clan families are permitted to be buried in coffins of that particular shape. Many coffin shapes evoke proverbs, which are interpreted in different ways by the Ga. That is why fantasy coffins are sometimes called proverbial coffins (abebuu adekai) or okadi adekai in the Ga language.

== History ==
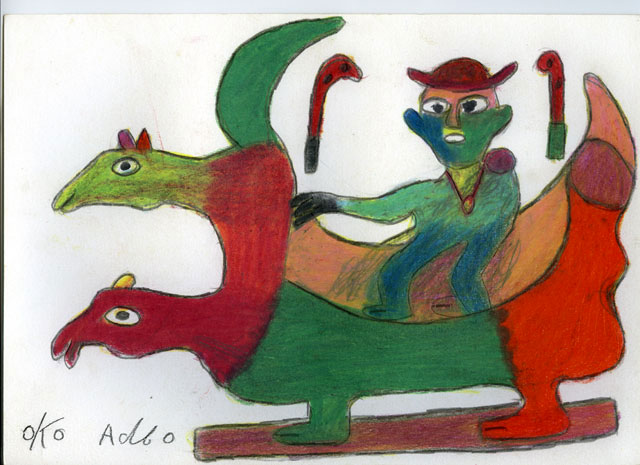
Figurative palanquin; drawing by Ataa Oko from Ghana

Among Christians, the use of custom coffins is relatively recent and began in the Greater Accra Region around 1950. They were formerly used only by Ga chiefs and priests, but since around 1960, figurative coffins have become an integral part of the local funeral culture. Previous to their use by Christians, Ga had been using figurative palanquins and coffins since the early 20th century.

The invention of figurative coffins was at one point attributed to Seth Kane Kwei, though the anthropologists Roberta Bonetti and Regula Tschumi question this myth. The idea of making and using custom coffins was inspired by the figurative palanquins in which the Ga chiefs were carried, and in which they were sometimes buried. According to some sources, Ataa Oko from La may have started making custom coffins and figurative palanquins around 1945. Along with Kane Kwei from Teshie and Ataa Oko from La, other carpenters may have begun making them in the early 1950s.

== Manufacture ==
Figurative coffins are produced to order. Master carpenters employ one or more apprentices who carry out a large part of the work. This allows the artist to make several coffins simultaneously. Coffins are generally made from the wood of the local wawa tree. In the interest of durability, items produced for museums are made from mahogany or another high-grade hardwood so as to guard against cracking and attacks by insects when transferred from one climate to another. Each coffin takes two to six weeks to produce, depending on the complexity of the construction and the carpenter's level of experience. For urgent orders, several carpenters will work on a single piece. The woodworking is done using simple, non-electric tools. Painting can take up to two days to complete. Some models are painted by the head of the workshop, others by local sign writers, some of whom are well known in the Western art market for making hand-painted movie posters. Coffin-makers and sign-painters usually decide together on the patterns and colors to use for a coffin.

== Notable artists ==
=== Kudjoe Affutu ===
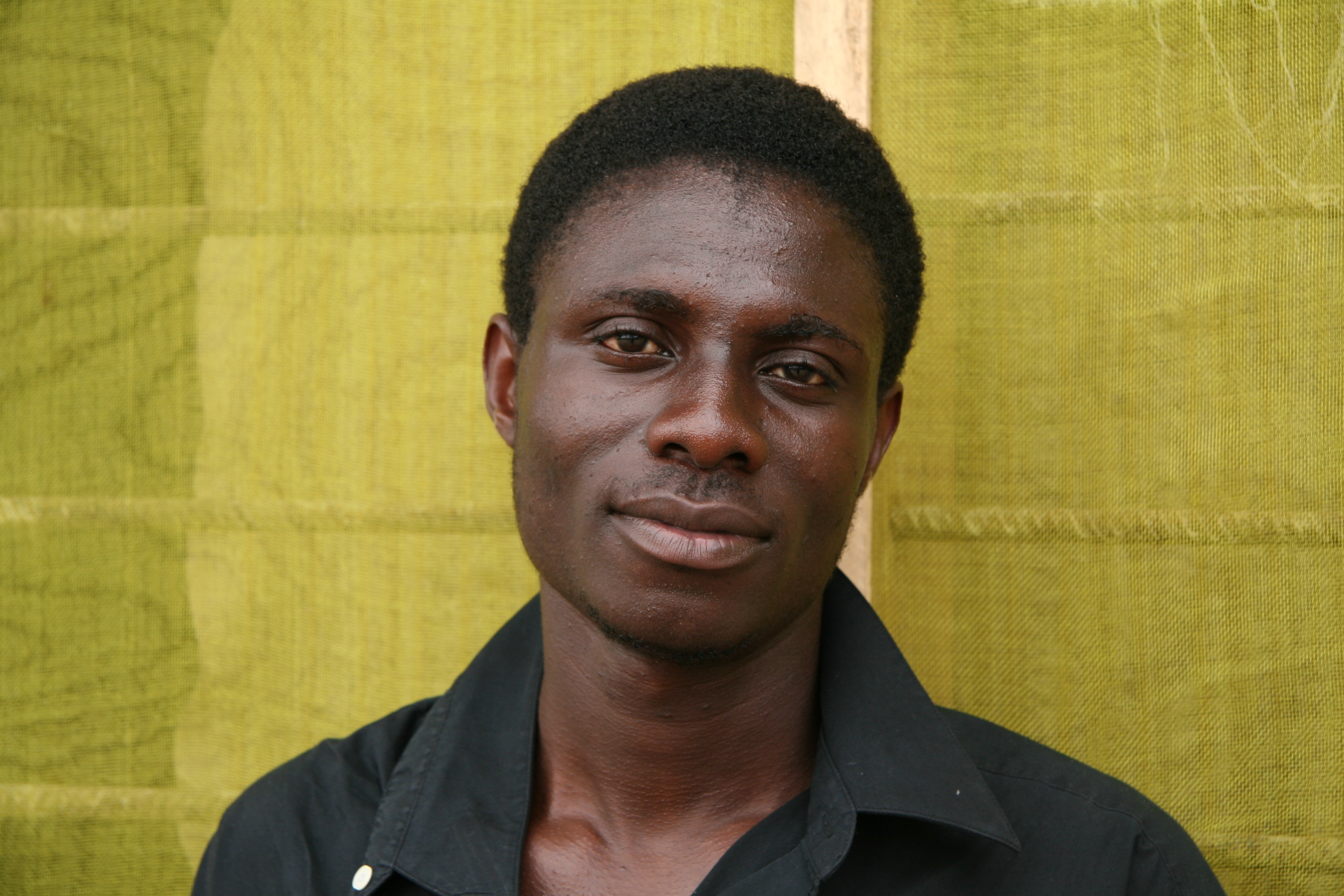
Kudjoe Affutu (2007)

Kudjoe Affutu was born in 1985 in Awutu Bawyiase, Central Region, Ghana. He was trained from 2002 to 2006 by Paa Joe in Nungua, Greater Accra Region. Since 2007 he has run his own workshop in Awutu Bawyiase, Central Region.

Kudjoe Affutu has collaborated with various European artists, including Thomas Demand, Sâadane Afif and the artist duo M.S. Bastian/Isabelle L. Kudjoe Affutu's coffins have been exhibited at the Centre Pompidou in Paris, the Tinguely Museum in Basel, the Nouveau Musée National de Monaco and the Musée d'ethnographie Neuchâtel. He later became specialized in the production of miniature coffins, a selection of which were shown in 2018 and 2019 at the Museum der Völker in Austria and in 2020 at the Kunsthalle Hamburg. Kudjoe Affutu has also worked with the Ghanaian curator Nana Oforiatta Ayim, who included his work in the opening exhibition of her gallery in Accra in 2017.

=== Eric Adjetey Anang ===
Born in 1985, Eric Adjetey Anang is the grandson of Seth Kane Kwei. He has run the Kane Kwei Carpentry Workshop with his father Cedi since 2005, after graduating from Accra Academy. Since 2009, he has been the subject of several documentaries produced in the UK, France, Brazil, Japan, Norway and the USA. He has been a resident artist in Russia, USA, Belgium, Denmark and organizes residencies for foreign artists in Ghana. He was invited to Italy for Milan Design Week in 2013 and South Korea for the Gwangju Biennale of Design in 2011.

=== Paa Joe ===
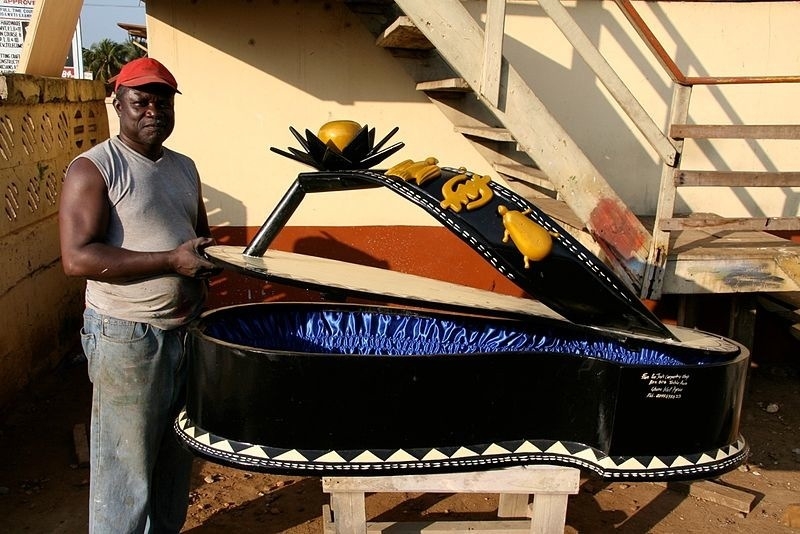
Paa Joe in 2006

Paa Joe was born in 1947 in the region of Akwapim, Ghana. He completed an apprenticeship with Kane Kwei in Teshie but left in 1974. In 1976, he opened his own workshop in Nungua. In 1989, he was invited to show his work in the exhibition "Les Magiciens de la terre" in Paris. Since then, his coffins have been shown all over the world. In 2005, they were exhibited in the Jack Shainman Gallery in New York and Jack Bell Gallery London. In 2006, he participated in the exhibition "Six Feet Under" at the Kunstmuseum Bern. In 2007, he opened a new workshop in Pobiman near Accra and in May 2013 he was a resident artist in the UK with his son Jacob. He was the subject of the Artdocs film Paa Joe and the Lion directed by Benjamin Wigley and produced by Anna Griffin, released in 2016.

=== Eric Kpakpo ===
Eric Kpakpo was born in 1979 in Nungua, Ghana. He studied carpentry from 1994 until 2000 at Paa Joe's workshop in Nungua. He remained there as a master carpenter until 2006, when he opened his own coffin workshop in La and became one of the most successful coffin artists in his region. He occasionally works with his former master Paa Joe. He has also made a name for himself in the international art market, particularly for his miniature coffins. In 2019, Kpakpo's work was shown in Ghana at the mobile museum of the Ghanaian curator Nana Oforiatta Ayim. In 2024 the artist was part of the group show Magic Ghana at the gallery Magnin-A in Paris.

=== Daniel "Hello" Mensah ===
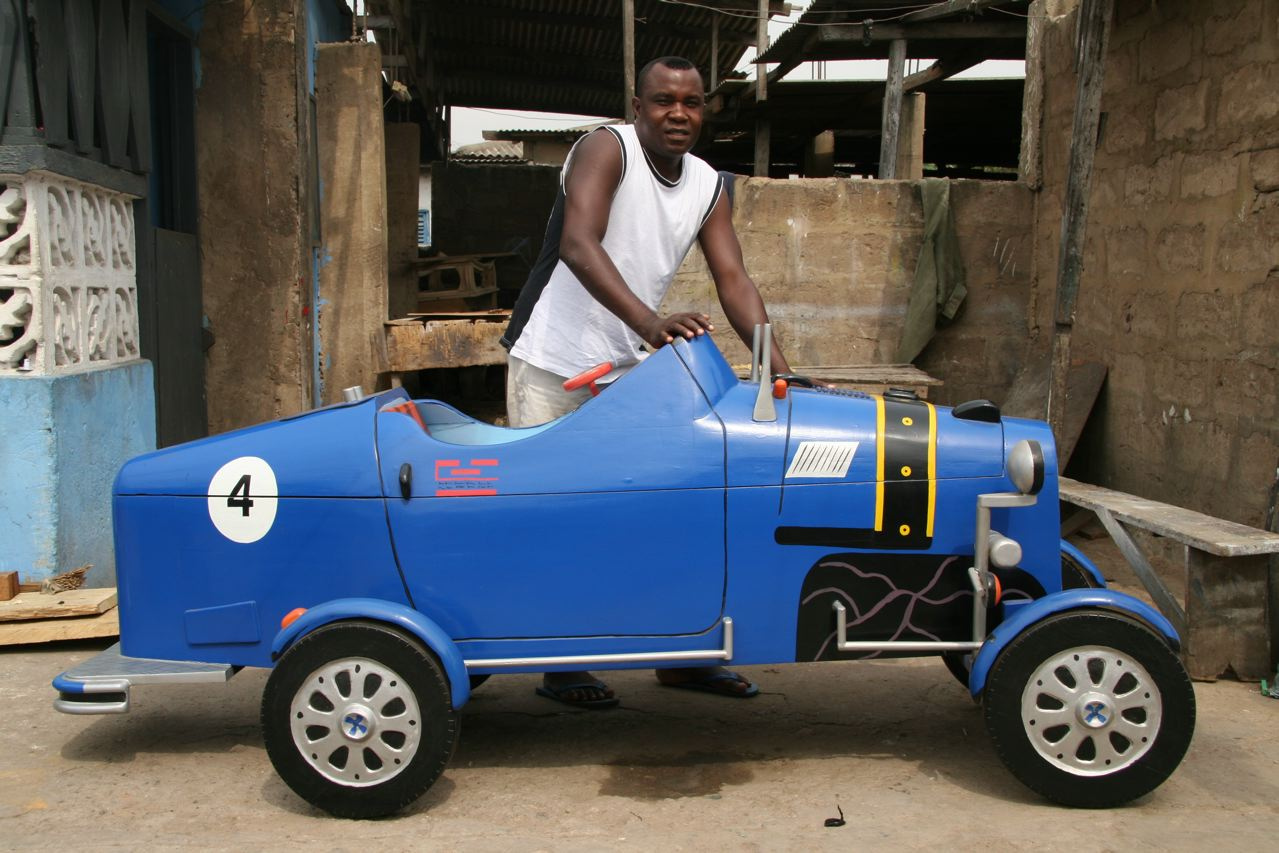
Daniel "Hello" Mensah in 2006

Daniel Mensah, also known as "Hello," was born in 1968 in Teshie, Ghana. He completed a six-year apprenticeship with Paa Joe in Nungua before spending eight more years with Paa Joe. In 1998, he opened his own studio, Hello Design Coffin Works, in Teshie. His work has been shown in various international art exhibitions and European films. In 2011, his work was shown at the Sainsbury Centre for Visual Arts.

=== Ataa Oko ===
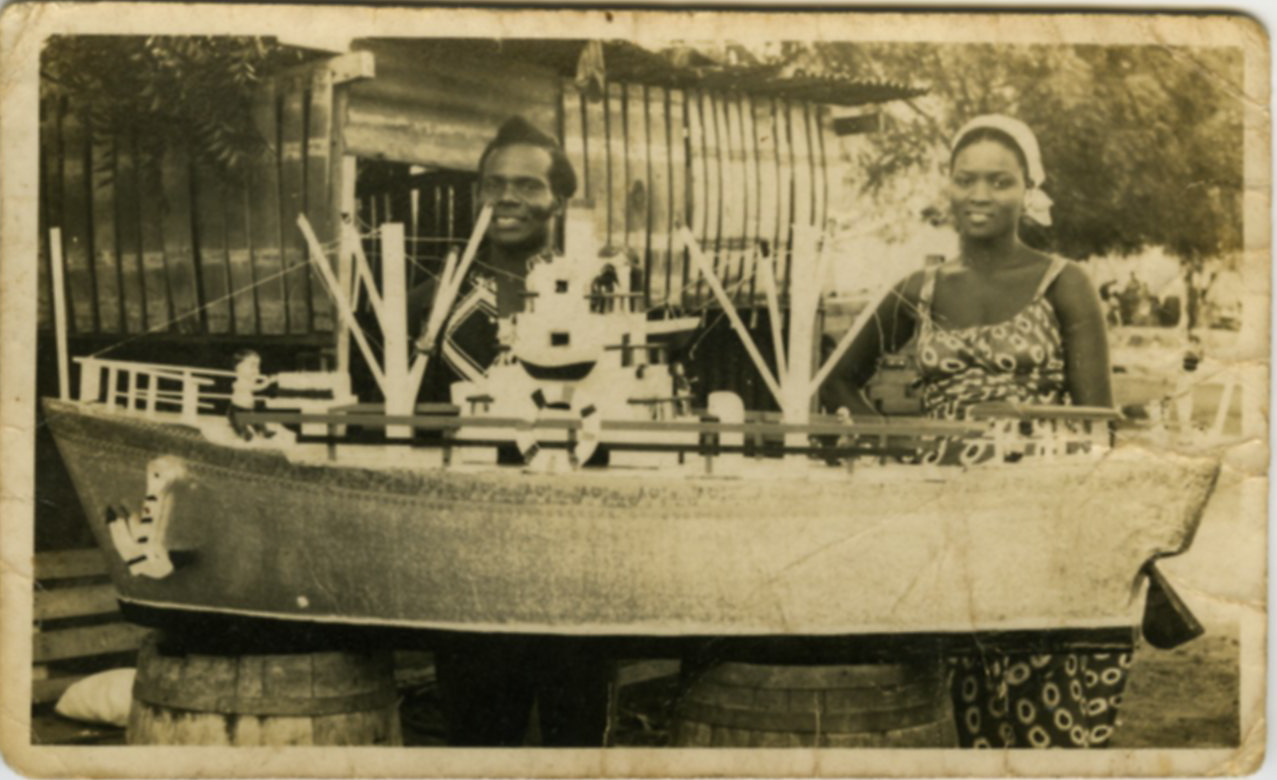
Ataa Oko and his third wife with a battleship coffin, c. 1960

Ataa Oko was born in the coastal town of La, Ghana. From 1936 to 1939 he was trained as a carpenter in Accra. Until 2002, he made coffins only for Ghanaian customers and thus remained unknown in Western art circles. In 2006, his work was exhibited for the first time at an art museum in Bern. Uninfluenced by Western customers, Ataa Oko developed his own form of artistic language. His work is therefore different from artists in Kane Kwei's tradition, not only in terms of design and materials but in overall appearance. From 2005 until his death in 2012, he worked as a painter under the supervision of anthropologist Regula Tschumi. In 2010-11 he had his first one-man show in a Western art museum, in the Collection de l'Art Brut in Lausanne.

== Gallery ==
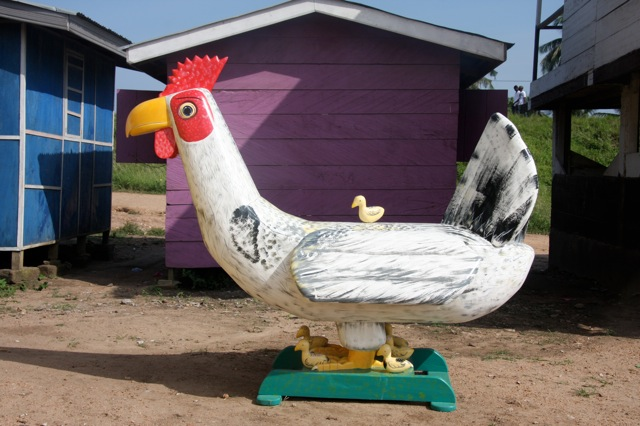
Hen coffin by Kudjoe Affutu, 2008.

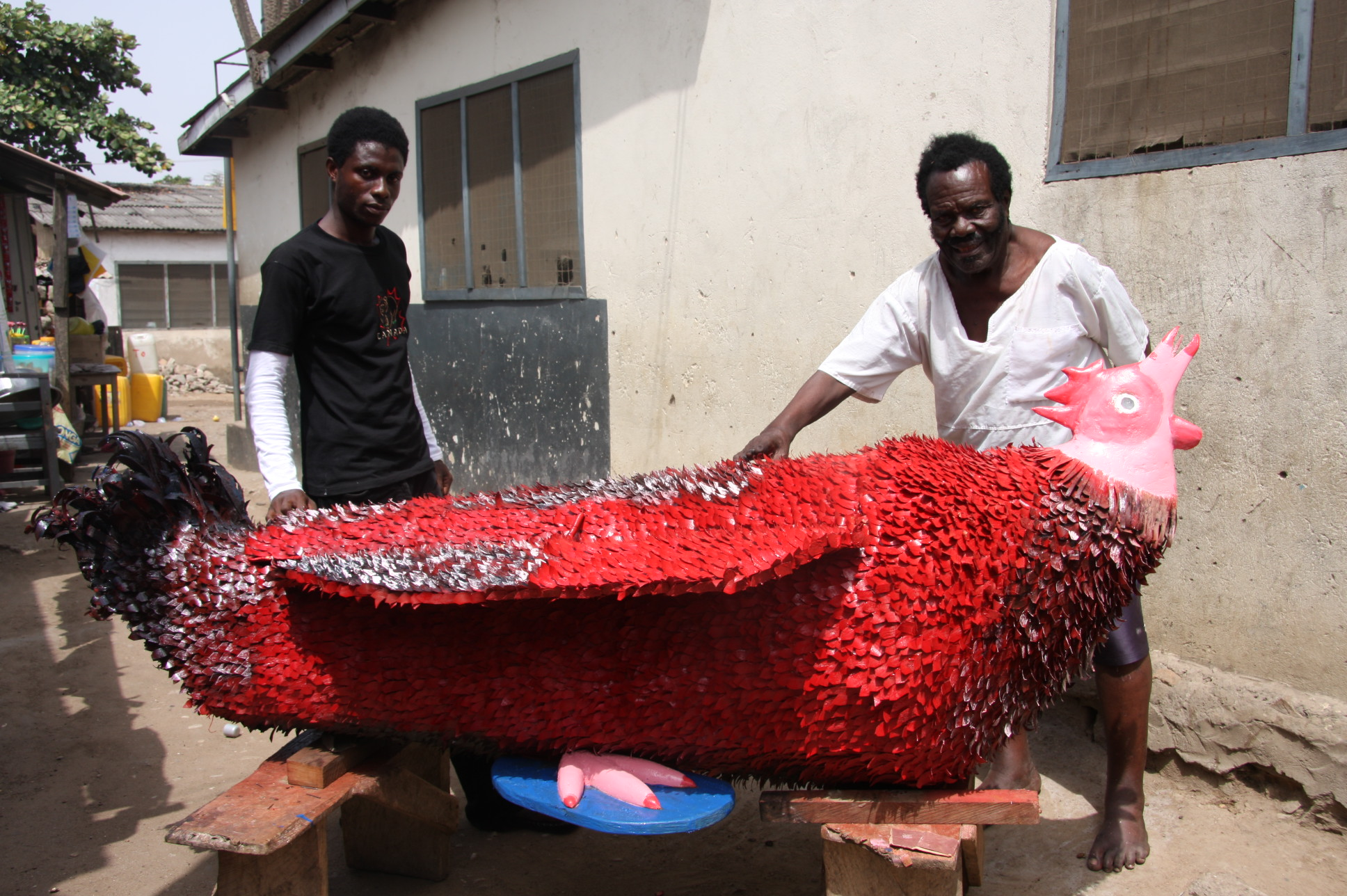
Ataa Oko and Kudjoe Affutu with Okos red rooster coffin 2009.

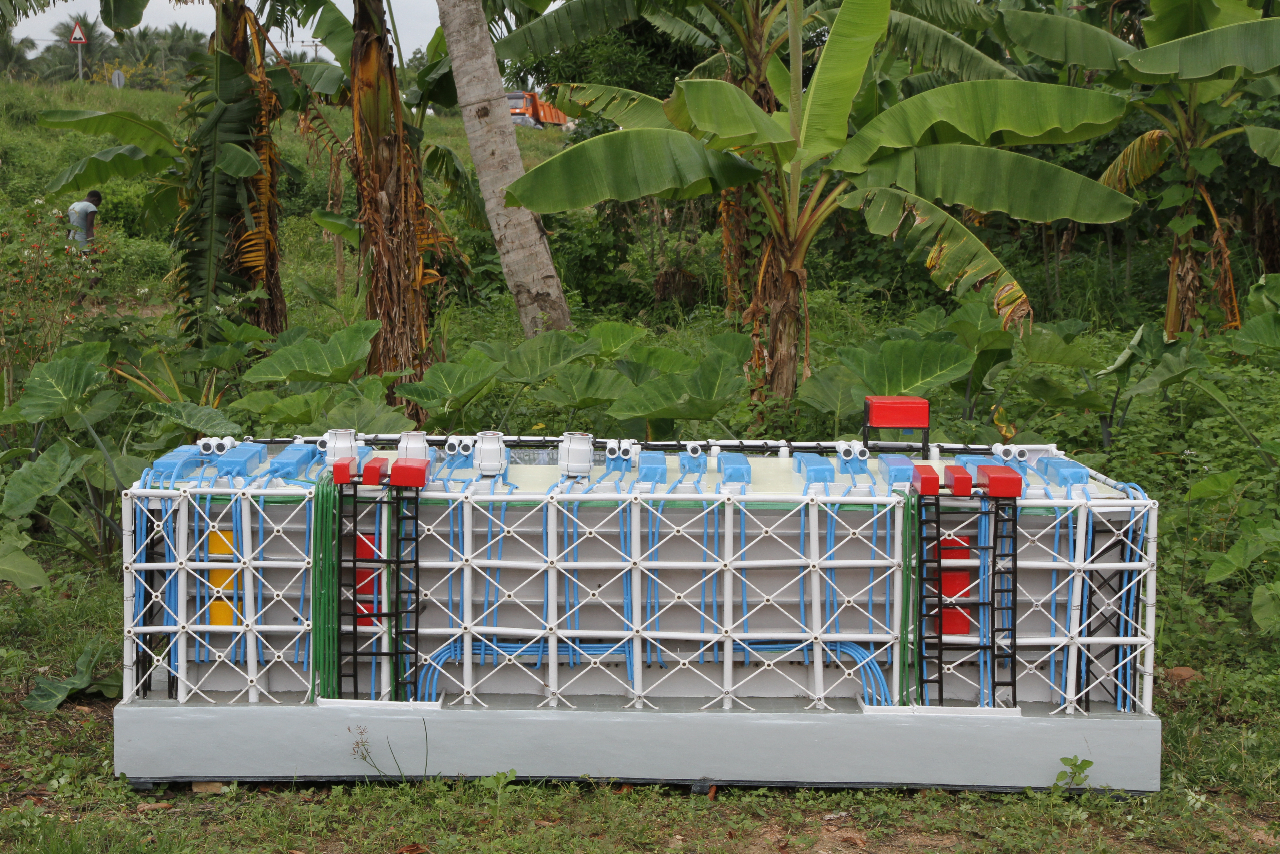
Centre Pompidou coffin, Kudjoe Affutu, 2010.

== Bibliography ==
- 2025 Regula Tschumi: Buried in Style. Artistic Coffins and Funerary Culture in Ghana. Heidelberg, Kehrer Verlag. ISBN 978-3-96900-189-9
- Regula Tschumi: Concealed Art. The figurative palanquins and coffins of Ghana. Edition Till Schaap, Bern. ISBN 978-3-03828-099-6.
- Regula Tschumi: The buried treasures of the Ga: Coffin art in Ghana. Edition Till Schaap, Bern, 2014. ISBN 9783038280163. A revised and updated second edition of Benteli 2008.
- Regula Tschumi: The Figurative Palanquins of the Ga. History and Significance, in: African Arts, vol. 46, no. 4, 2013, p. 60-73
- Ataa Oko, Ex. Cat., Collection de l'art brut (ed), Infolio, 2010
- Roberta Bonetti: Alternate Histories of the Abebuu Adekai, in: African Arts, Bd. 43, no. 3, 2010, p. 14-33.
- Vivian Burns: Travel to Heaven: Fantasy Coffins, in: African Arts, vol. 17, no. 2 (1974), p. 24-25
- Jean-Hubert Martin: Kane Kwei, Samuel Kane Kwei, in: André Magnin (ed.): Contemporary Art of Africa. Thames and Hudson, London 1996, p. 76.
- Thierry Secretan: Going into darkness: Fantastic coffins from Africa. London 1995.
- Regula Tschumi: A Report on Paa Joe and the Proverbial Coffins of Teshie and Nungua, Ghana, in: Africa et Mediterraneo, no. 47–8, 2004, pp. 44–7
- Regula Tschumi: Last Respects, First Honoured. Ghanaian Burial Rituals and Figural Coffins, in: Kunstmuseum Bern (ed.): Six Feet Under. Autopsy of Our Relation to the Dead. Kerber, Bielefeld & Leipzig 2006, p. 114-125.
- Regula Tschumi: A Deathbed of a Living Man. A Coffin for the Centre Pompidou, in: Sâadane Afif (ed.), Anthologie de l’humour noir. Edition Centre Pompidou, Paris 2010, p. 56–61.
