= Lewis Smith (artist) =

American outsider artist

Lewis Smith (1907 – 1998, Ohio) was an artist belonging to the Outsider art movement.

== Biography ==
Smith, who was born and lived in the state of Ohio, began to draw in 1920. His work records details of American life, especially related to railways and sport events he attended during his rail travel. His passion for travel was supported by a pass allowing him to travel throughout the United States by train due to his father working for a railway company. While he drew for most of his life, including on the walls of his house, his work was only discovered towards the end of his life.

== Works ==
Lewis mainly used graphite and coloured pencils on found materials, for instance paper bags and biscuit boxes. His drawings from the 1920s record trains with many details. He further collected photographs from railway workers and other documents such as newspapers associated with railroads. He traveled especially to follow women’s athletic events featuring muscular women boxers and wrestlers that he often depicted on brown paper from grocery bags. He also recorded the hospitality places he visited, such as lunch counters and diners. He is also known for his erotic drawings on found paper.

== Collections ==
His work can be found in the collections of:

- American Folk Art Museum, New York
- American Visionary Art Museum, Baltimore
- Collection de l'Art Brut, Lausanne

== Bibliography ==
Decharme, Bruno, abcd, Une collection d'Art Brut, abcd & Actes Sud, Paris, 2000
