= Lois Smith (disambiguation) =

Lois Smith (born 1930) is an American actress.

Lois Smith may also refer to:

- Lois Smith (dancer) (1929–2011), Canadian ballet dancer and teacher
- Lois Smith (publicist) (1928–2012), American entertainment publicist
- Lois Nadean Smith (1940–2001), American woman executed in Oklahoma

== See also ==
- Louis Smith (disambiguation)
