= Louis Smith =

Louis Smith may refer to:

- Louis Smith (Australian politician) (1830–1910), member of the Victorian Legislative Assembly
- Louis Smith (British politician) (1879–1939), British Conservative Party politician
- Louis Carter Smith (1870–1961), archery champion and historian
- Louis Laybourne Smith (1880–1965), Australian architect
- Lou Smith (1928–2007), American singer
- Louis Smith (musician) (1931–2016), American jazz trumpeter
- Louis Smith (gymnast) (born 1989), British gymnast
- Louis Smith (cricketer) (born 2005), Australian cricketer
- Louis S. Smith II, co-founder of Shindana Toys
- Louis Smith Tainter, for whom the Louis Smith Tainter House is named after

== See also ==
- Lewis Smith (disambiguation)
- Lois Smith (disambiguation)
