= Lewis Smith (cricketer) =

English cricketer

Lewis Alfred Smith was an English cricketer active from 1934 to 1947 who played for Middlesex and Northamptonshire (Northants). He was born in Brentford on 12 July 1913 and died in Ealing on 10 September 1978. He appeared in five first-class matches as a righthanded batsman who bowled right arm fast medium. He scored 92 runs with a highest score of 55 and took eleven wickets with a best performance of four for 55.
