= M.S. Bastian & Isabelle L. =

Swiss artist couple

M. S. Bastian and Isabelle L. are a Swiss artist couple who has made a name for themselves with their comic art, including paintings, sculptures, animated films and installations.

== Personal life ==
=== M.S. Bastian ===
M.S. Bastian, whose real name is Marcel Sollberger, was born 1963 in Berne. He attended the School of Design in Berne and Biel and trained for a year in New York and Paris. Since 1993 M.S. Bastian worked as a freelance artist based in Biel. He has been awarded with several scholarships and prizes, including the Anderfuhren Scholarship Biel, the Louise Aeschlimann scholarship of the Canton of Berne, and he got twice the Swiss Federal Design Prize. In January 2019 M.S. Bastian and Isabelle L. were awarded by an independent jury as "Biel people of the year 2018".

=== Isabelle L. ===
Isabelle L., whose real name is Isabelle Laubscher, was born in 1967 in Biel. She attended the graphic arts class at the School of Design in Biel and worked in various advertising agencies as a graphic artist. For further education, she spent some time in Los Angeles and Austin (USA). Since 2003 she works as a freelance artist with her husband M.S.Bastian.

== Exhibitions ==
Since 2005, M.S. Bastian and Isabelle L. had numerous solo and group exhibitions in galleries and museums throughout Europe.

=== Solo shows ===
- 2023 - Pulps Abenteuerfahrt, Kunsthaus Zofingen (CH)
- 2022 - PULPOKOSMOS Eine Abenteuerfahrt durch eine schauerlich schöne Welt, Kunsthalle Wil SG (CH)
- 2021 - PULPOKOSMOS Eine Abenteuerfahrt durch eine schauerlich schöne Welt, Kunsthaus Grenchen (CH)
- 2020 - Musée imaginaire, Espace Jean Tinguely + Niki de Saint Phalle Fribourg (CH)
- 2017 - Bastokalypse & Bastomania, Egon Schiele Art Centre, Český Krumlov (CZ)
- 2017 - Bastokalypse, Vasarely Foundation, Aix-en-Provence (F)
- 2017 - Guernopolis, Kunsthalle Lucerne (CH)
- 2016 - Bastokalypse, Galerija Kresija Ljubljana (SL)
- 2016 - Paradis mystérieux, Halle Nord Genève (CH)
- 2015 - Paradis Mystérieux, Museum Goch (D)
- 2014 - Paradis mystérieux, New Museum Biel (CH)
- 2012 - Bastokalypse, Kunsthalle Arbon (CH)
- 2010 - Bastokalypse, Museum Goch / Reichswald Barracks (D)
- 2005 - From Zaffaraya to Bastropolis, Kunsthaus Grenchen (CH)
- 2005 - M.S. Bastian - Pulp, Museum Goch (D).

=== Group shows ===
- 2019 - Ohne Verfallsdatum - Donations and loans of the Migros Collection Aare, Kunstmuseum Bern (CH)
- 2017 - L'impermanence des choses, African Pulps made in collaboration with the Ghanaian artist Kudjoe Affutu in the permanent exhibition of the Musée d'ethnographie de Neuchâtel (CH).
- 2013 - The Second Decade, 20 Years Kunsthalle Arbon, Kunsthalle Arbon (CH)
- 2013 - Deluxe! The comic magazine Strapazin, Cartoonmuseum Basel (CH)
- 2011 - What are you doing after the apocalypse ?, Musée d'Ethnographie Neuchâtel MEN (CH)
- 2009 - Armor & Robe, Bastokalypse, Part 1, Museum Tinguely Basel (CH)
- 2024 – M.S. Bastian / Isabelle L. - Wonderland, Galerie da Mihi, Bern

== Bibliography ==
- 2022 – Pulps Paradies, Gallery Urs Reichlin, Zug (CH)
- 2021 - Pulpastique, Gallery Urs Reichlin, Zug (CH)
- 2021 - Sketchbook, Foundation Kunsthaus Grenchen, (CH)
- 2018 – Bastomania, Scheidegger & Spiess, Zurich (CH)
- 2010 - Bastokalypse, Scheidegger & Spiess, Zurich (CH)
- 2008 - Päng No. 2, Edition Fästing Plockare, Biel / Bienne (CH)
- 2007 - 100 vues de Bastropolis, agpi Genève et Vertige Graphic, Paris (F)
- 2007 - 100 views of Bastropolis, Benteli Verlag, Bern (CH)
- 2004 - Worldtour, Stripburger, Ljubljana (SLO) 2004 - Pulp, edition clandestin, Biel / Bienne (CH)
- 2001 - It's a wonderful World, Benteli Verlag Bern (CH)
- 2000 - Peep-Trash-Bubbles, Le dernier Cri, Marseille (F)
- 1997 - Squid, Le dernier Cri Marseille (F)
- 1997 - Chocolate bar, French Edition - Les étoiles et les cochons, Paris (F)
- 1997 - Squeeze, self-published by Roli Fischbacher (CH)
- 1996 - CoMIXart, Benteli, Bern (CH)
- 1995 - Krampniz rat heart, cyanide crisis publishing house, Berlin (D)
- 1995 - Päng, Edition Modern, Zurich (CH)
- 1995 - Baluba, Amok Verlag, Paris (F)
- 1994 - Chocolate bars, cyanide crisis publishing house, Berlin (D)
- 1993 - Crunch, Martin Barber Verlag, Berlin (D)

=== Publications about M.S. Bastian & Isabelle L. ===
- 2019 Bieler/In des Jahres: M.S. Bastian and Isabelle L. (Biel people of the year 2018), Mario Cortesi in: Biel/Bienne Newspaper, p. 1 and 9 (G./Fr.).
- 2010 Woe woe woe, Konrad Tobler in: Bastokalypse, Scheidegger & Spiess, Zurich, (G./Engl./Fr.).
- 2007 Saving the Bastian-World, Guido Magnaguagno in: 100 vues de Bastropolis. Vertige Graphic Geneva, p. 11–13,(French).
- 2007 Patckwork family, Andreas Meier in: 100 vues de Bastropolis. Vertige Graphic Geneva, p. 6–10, (French).
- 2001 It's a wonderful World, Wilfredd von Gunten in: It's a wonderful World, Benteli, (German).
- 2001 Micky, der Meisterdetektiv, Andreas Meier in: It's a wonderful World, Benteli, (German).
- 1996 Bildbetrachtung Nr. 4, Urs Dickerhof in: Comixart, Benteli, P. 7–10, (German).
