= Kudjoe Affutu =

Ghanaian artist (born 1985)

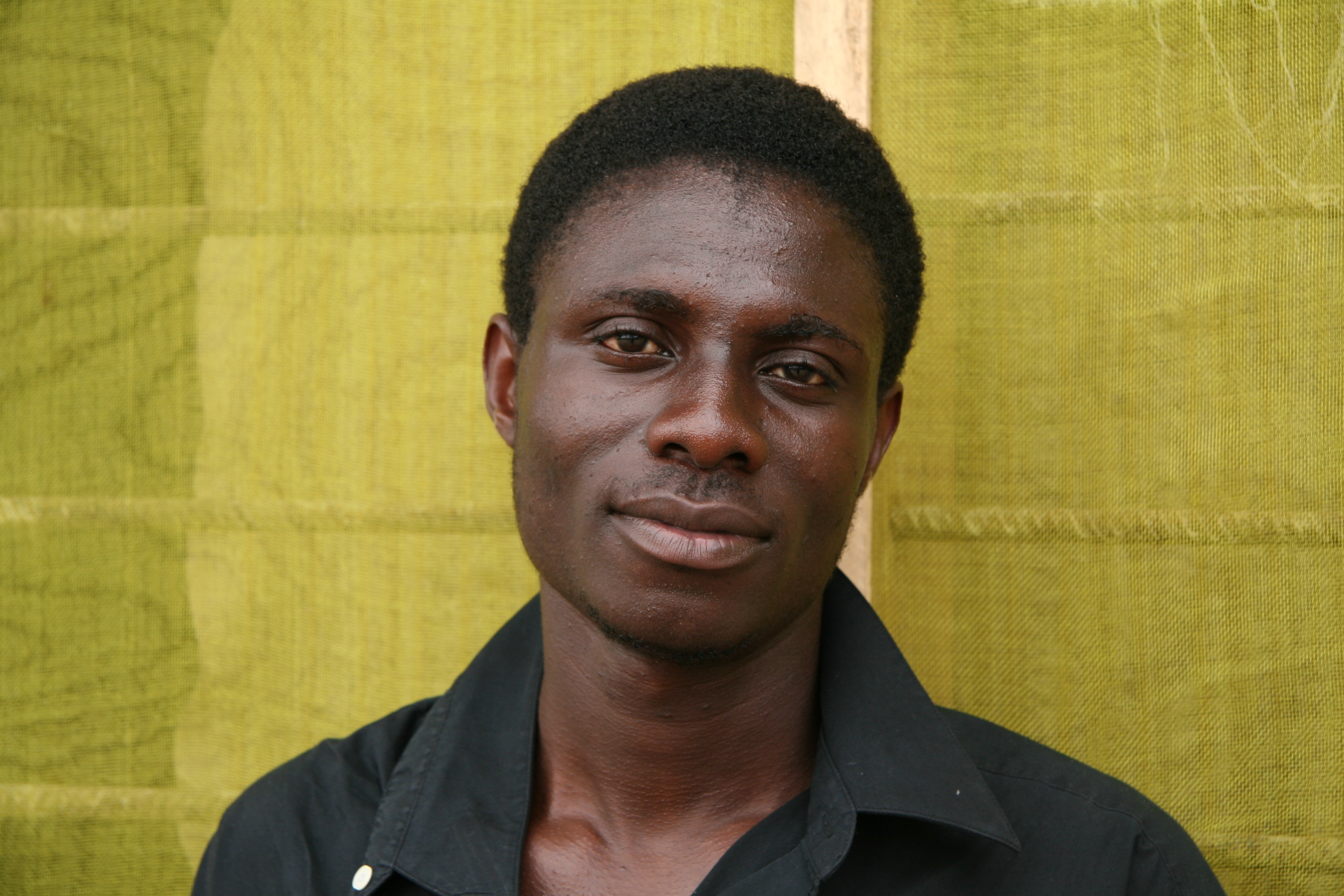
Kudjoe Affutu (2007)

Kudjoe Affutu (born 1985) is a Ghanaian artist and figurative coffin and palanquin builder. He was born and still lives in Awutu Bawyiase, Central Region, Ghana. Affutu has made a name for himself in Europe by participating in various art projects and exhibitions.

== Biography ==
From 2002 to 2006, he trained with the internationally renowned coffin artist Paa Joe in the Greater Accra Region. Since 2007 he has been running his own workshop in the town of his birth, producing figurative coffins and sculptures for Ghanaian funerals, art museums and private collectors. He collaborated, among others, with Ataa Oko, the artist couple M.S. Bastian and Isabelle L., Saâdane Afif, and Thomas Demand.

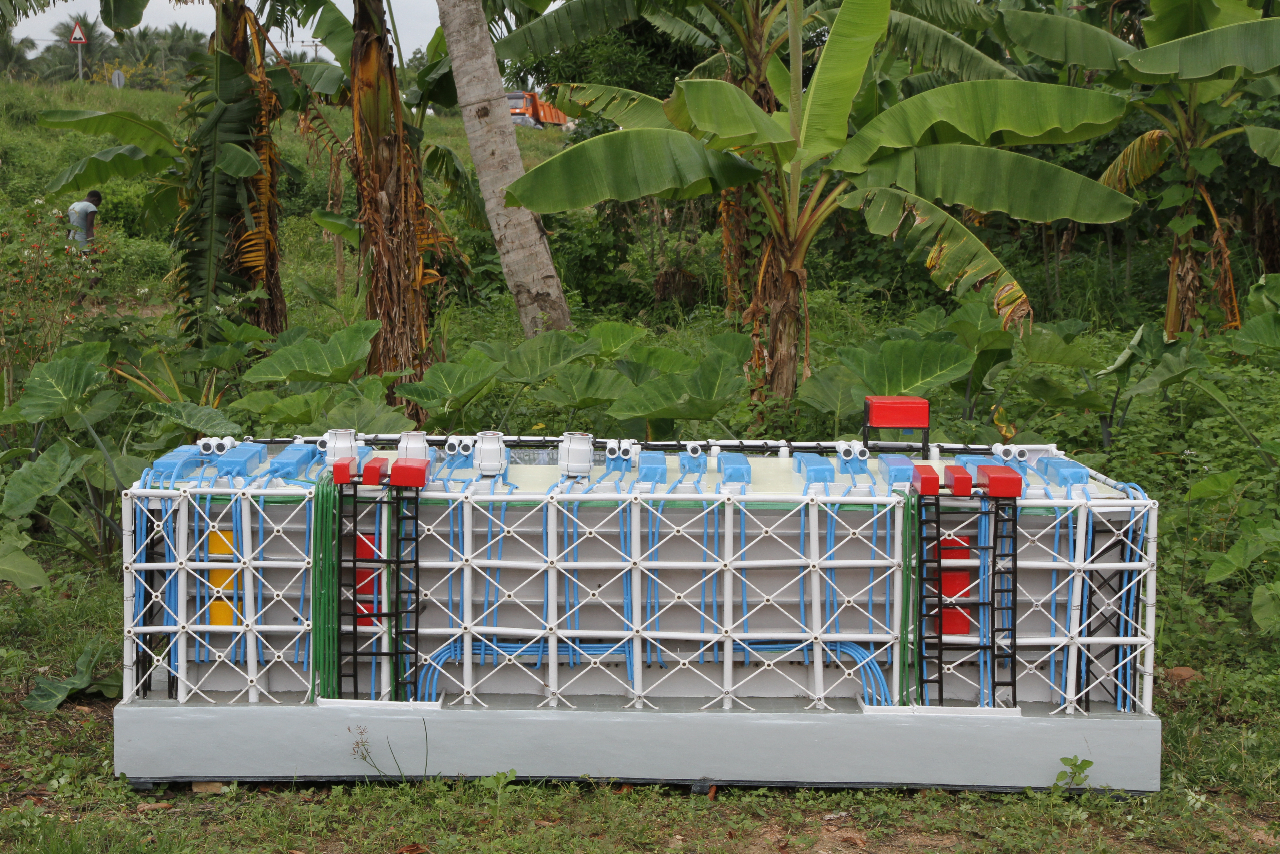
Centre Pompidou coffin, Kudjoe Affutu (2010)

== Commissioned works ==
- 2011. Africa Pulp figures for M.S. Bastian and Isabelle L.
- 2010. Sculptures for the museum shop of the Tinguely Museum Basel.
- 2010. Hummer coffin for the Tinguely Museum Basel.
- 2010. Pompidou coffin for Saâdane Afif.
- 2010. Fridge Coffin for Thomas Demand.
- 2008. Lion-, Nokia-, Red Rooster-coffin for Regula Tschumi.
- 2007. Africa Pulp figures for M.S. Bastian and Isabelle L.
- 2006. Sculptures for the museum shop of the Kunstmuseum Berne.

== Group exhibitions ==
- 2020. Mourning. On Loss and Change, Kunsthalle Hamburg, Hamburg.
- 2018/19. Unvergessen machen, Museum der Völker, Schwaz, Austria.
- 2017/19. L'impermanence des choses, Africa Pulps, permanent exhibition in the Musée d'ethnographie de Neuchâtel.
- 2017/18. Jambo Africa, Tropical House Wolhusen, Switzerland.
- 2017. Accra: Portraits of A City, ANO Gallery Accra.
- 2016/21. Gross. Dinge Deutungen Dimensionen , Museum of Cultures Basle.
- 2016/18. C'est la vie, Museum of Natural History Berne.
- 2012/13. Hors-Champs, MMusée d'ethnographie de Neuchâtel.
- 2011. La carte d’après nature. Matthew Marks Gallery New York.
- 2011. Fetisch Auto. Ich fahre, also bin ich. Tinguely Museum Basel.
- 2010/11. La carte d’après nature. A show curated by Thomas Demand in the New Museum of Montecarlo, Villa Paloma. Montecarlo.
- 2010/11. Ataa Oko Collection de l'art brut, Lausanne. Red Rooster, a collaboration of Ataa Oko with Kudjoe Affutu.

== List of references, media ==
- 2025 Regula Tschumi: Buried in Style. Artistic Coffins and Funerary Culture in Ghana. Heidelberg, Kehrer Verlag. ISBN 978-3-96900-189-9
- 2014 Regula Tschumi: Concealed Art. The figurative palanquins and coffins of Ghana. Edition Till Schaap, Bern. ISBN 978-3-03828-099-6
- 2014 Regula Tschumi: The buried treasures of the Ga: Coffin art in Ghana. Edition Till Schaap, Bern, p. 112-117, 231. ISBN 978-3-03828-016-3. A revised and updated second edition of "The buried treasures of the Ga", Bern: Benteli 2008.
- 2013 Regula Tschumi: The Figurative Palanquins of the Ga. History and Significance, in: African Arts, vol. 46, 4, p. 60-73.
- 2012/13 Hors-Champs, ed. MEN Musée d'Ethnographie Neuchâtel. Neuchâtel, Atélier PréText, p. 205.
- 2012 Regula Tschumi: Deathbed of a Living Man. A Coffin for the Centre Pompidou, in Eva Huttenlauch (ed): "Another Anthology of Black Humor". MMK Frankfurt, Verlag für Moderne Kunst, p. 88-96.
- 2011 Tinguely Museum (Hrsg.), Car Fetish. I drive, therefore I am. Ex. Cat. Heidelberg. Kehrer.
- 2011 Saâdane Afif talks about "Anthologie de l’humour noir" in: Artforum International. 1000 Words. January 2011, p. 194-197.
- 2010 A walk in the Park, Thomas Demand in: Nouveau Musée National de Monaco (Hg.), La carte d’après nature. London: MACK, p. 92-113.
