= Regula Tschumi =

Swiss ethnologist

Regula Tschumi is a Swiss social anthropologist and art historian.

== Biography ==
Regula Tschumi has spent time in East, West and South Africa, researching into contemporary African art. In 2006 she published a standard work on the figurative coffins of the Ga people. In this book she traces the origins of these coffins in the art and religion of the Ga, and questions the history of their evolution. In the course of this research RegulaTschumi discovered the coffin-artist and art brut painter Ataa Oko, born 1919, from La, in Ghana. Ataa Oko was making figurative coffins as long ago as 1945, that is to say, according to her, before Kane Kwei, who was generally recognised outside Ghana as having "invented" these coffins for the burial rituals of the Ga. In her PhD thesis 2013, Regula Tschumi makes the first deep research about the formerly unknown figurative palanquins of the Ga. She shows how the figurative palanquins are related with the figurative coffins, and why the figurative palanquins were used in Accra as early as 1930. She discovered that differently from what many Ga believe, no chief has ever been buried in his figurative palanquin. Palanquins belong to the powerful royal insignias which in the Ga culture may never be buried. Therefore, kings were not buried in their palanquin, but in a coffin that looked the same like their palanquin. This was necessary because the Ga believe that enstoolments and funerals are complementary.

Regula Tschumi has taken part in various exhibition projects in leading museums, when she worked with different Ghanaian artists and coffin-palanquin-makers like Paa Joe, Ataa Oko and Kudjoe Affutu among others.

== Publications ==
- 2025 Buried in Style. Artistic Coffins and Funerary Culture in Ghana. Heildelberg, Kehrer Verlag. ISBN 978-3-96900-189-9
- 2021. Regula Tschumi (ed.): Ataa Oko Addo. With text contributions by Sarah Lombardi, Lucienne Peiry, Regula Tschumi and Atta Kwami, Edition Clandestin, Biel, ISBN 978-3-907262-05-4.
- 2017 Ataa Oko. A glimpse inside the amazing world of Ghanaian funerals and how the carpenter Ataa Oko became an artis, Kvadrat Interwoven: the fabric of things, online article.
- 2014 Concealed Art. The figurative palanquins and coffins of Ghana. Edition Till Schaap, Bern. ISBN 978-3-03828-099-6.
- 2014 The Buried Treasures of the Ga: Coffin Art in Ghana. Edition Till Schaap, Bern. ISBN 978-3-03828-016-3. A revised and updated second edition of Benteli 2008.
- 2013 The Figurative Palanquins of the Ga. History and Significance, in: African Arts, vol. 46, 4, 2013, pp. 60–73.
- 2013 Die figürlichen Sänften und Särge der Ga im Süden Ghanas. Geschichte, Transformation und Sinn einer künstlerischen Ausdrucksform von den Anfängen bis in die Gegenwart, (engl. The figurative palanquins and coffins of the Ga in Southern Ghana. History, transformation and meaning of a form of artistic expression from its origins to the present), PhD theses, phil.-hist. univ. Basle.
- 2010 The Deathbed of a Living Man. A Coffin for the Centre Pompidou, in: Saâdane Afif (ed.), Anthologie de l'humour noir, Paris: Editions Centre Pompidou, pp. 56–61.
- 2010 Ataa Oko et le langage formel des Ga in: Collection de l'art brut (ed.), Ataa Oko. Exhibition catalogue. Lausanne, Gollion: lnfolio.
- 2006 Last Respects, First Honoured. Ghanaian Burial Rituals and Figural Coffins in: Kunstmuseum Bern (ed.), Six Feet Under. Autopsy of Our Relation to the Dead. Ex.-Cat. Bielefeld, Leipzig: Kerber, pp. 114–125.

== Gallery ==
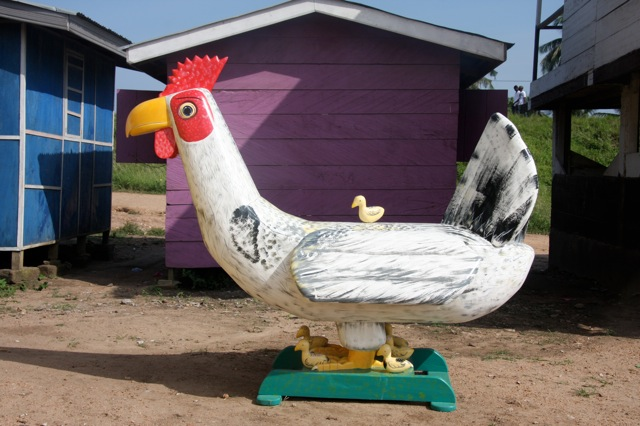
White chicken coffin made by Kudjoe Affutu (2008)

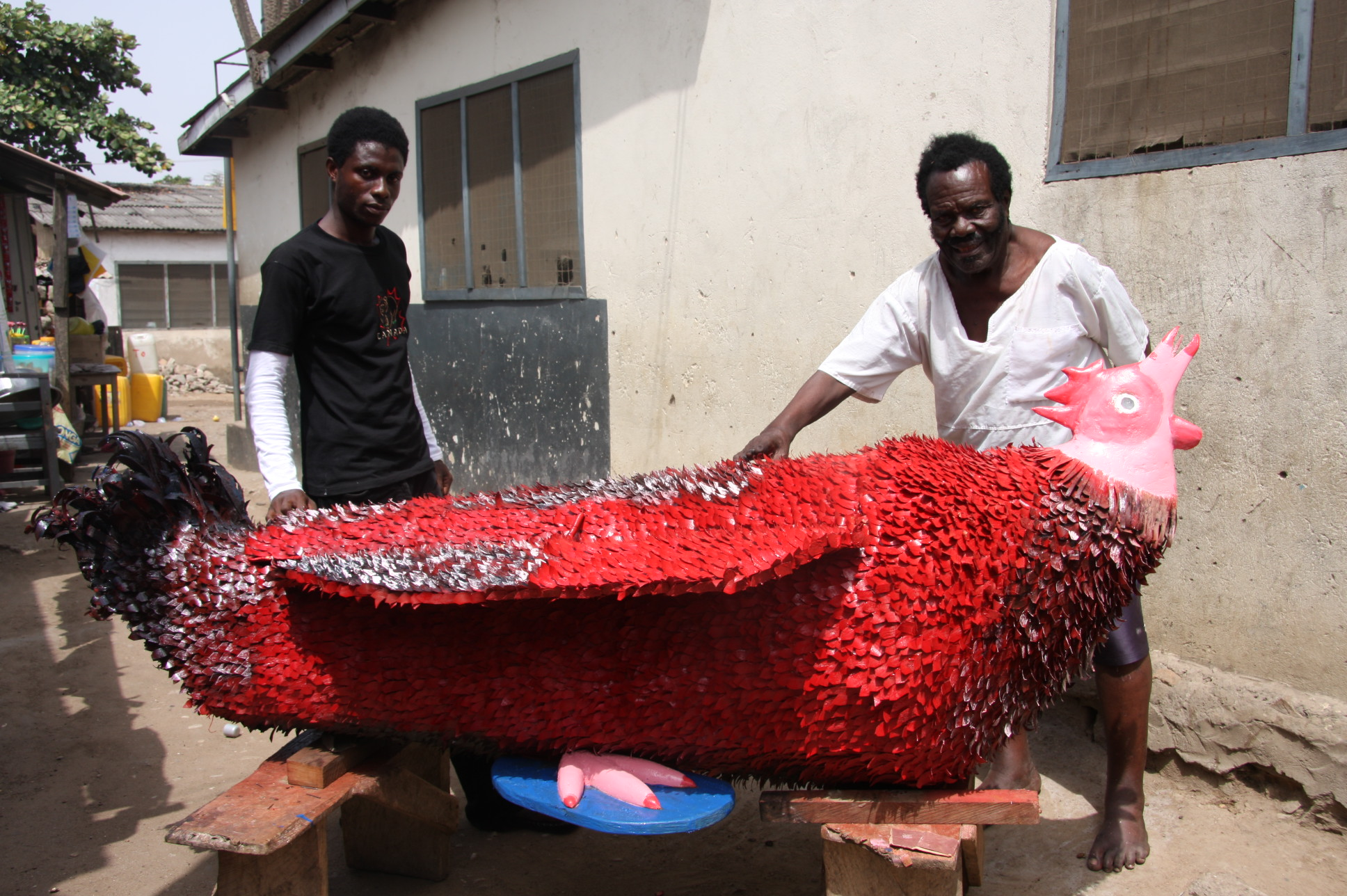
Ataa Oko and Kudjo Affutu with Oko's red rooster coffin for Regula Tschumi (2009)

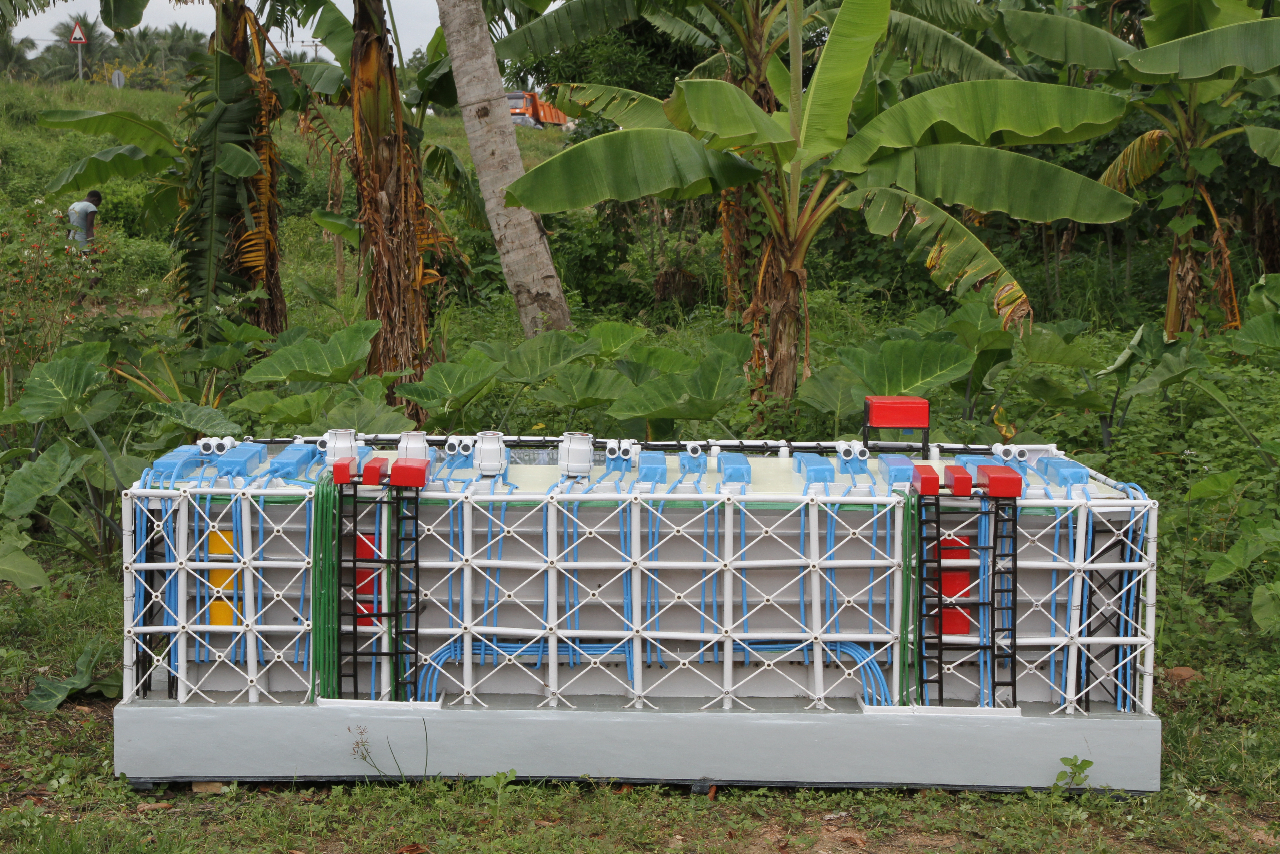
The „Pompidou coffin“ made by Kudjoe Affutu in collaboration with Regula Tschumi for the exhibition „Anthologie de l'humour noir“ of Saâdane Afif in the Centre Pompidou in Paris (2010)

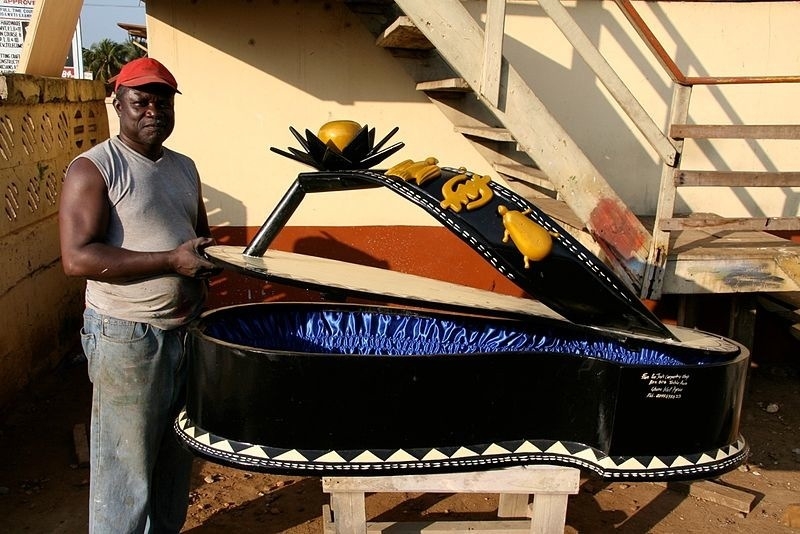
Paa Joe with his sandals coffin made for the Kunstmuseum Bern (2006)

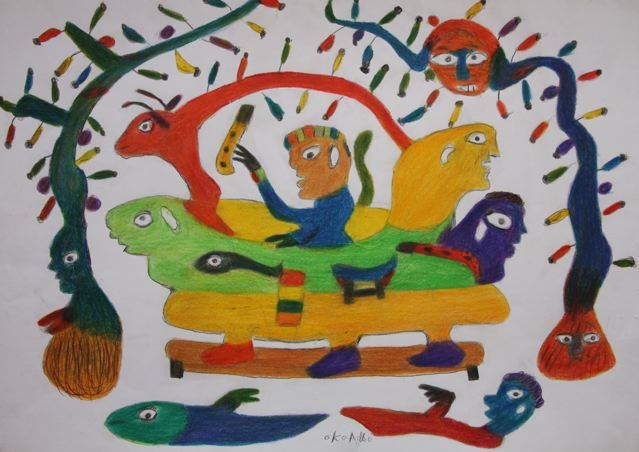
Figurative palanquin, drawing of Ataa Oko for Regula Tschumi (2010)
