= Figurative palanquin =

Ghanaian art work

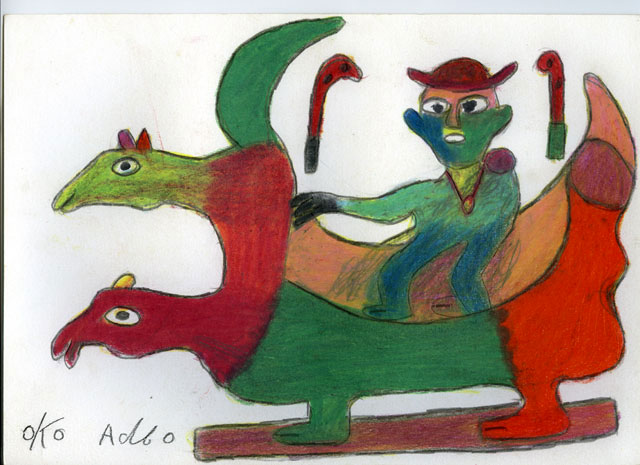
Figurative palanquin; drawing by Ataa Oko from Ghana

A figurative palanquin connected with the totem of its owner is a special kind of litter used in the Greater Accra Region in Ghana. These palanquins called in the Ga language okadi akpakai belong to the royal insignias and are used only by the Ga kings or mantsemei and their sub-chiefs when they are carried in public at durbars and festivals like Homowo. With these figurative palanquins the Ga create ethnic differences between themselves and their Akan neighbours that only use simple boat- or chair-shaped litters.

== Significance ==
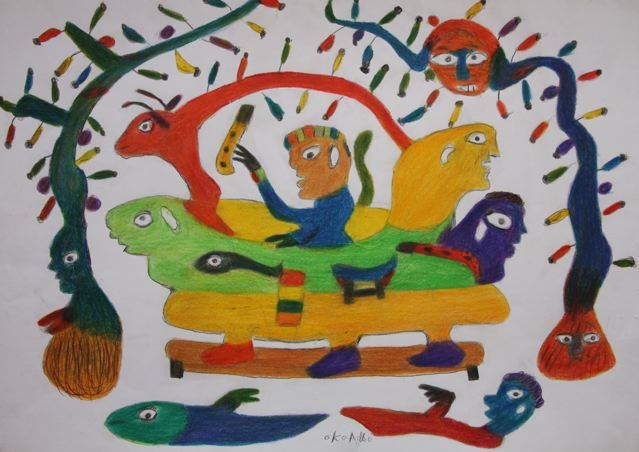
Figurative palanquin, drawing of Ataa Oko 2010

A Ga chief whose clan uses the lion as a totem must therefore use a litter in the form of a lion. The totems and family symbols of the Ga represent animals, plants or objects. All of them are associated with the history of the clan and his ancestors.

When a chief is carried in such a figurative palanquin, using his totem symbol ensures protection by the spirits and the ancestors which are connected with the respective symbol. At the same time the totem's magical powers are transferred to the chief who is sitting in the figurative palanquin. In contrast to the conventional boat- or chair-shaped Akan litters, the figurative palanquins of the Ga also function as marks of distinction between themselves and their Akan neighbours, and they even denote differences between the different Ga clans.

== History ==
In precolonial times, the Ga did not use litters, but carried their Chiefs on human shoulders. The ethnologist Margaret Field believes that the boat-shaped Akan litters were introduced in Accra by the Akwamu living there since the 17th century. In the course of the 19th century, when the Ga took over from the Akwamu parts of their military organization, they also adopted the use of palanquins. However, there are no exact sources describing when the Ga started to use palanquins in the form of their family symbols. The social anthropologist Regula Tschumi found only a short notice in the Gold Coast Independent 1925 indicating that the King of Accra, the so-called Ga mantse used an elephant shaped palanquin in those years. According to Tschumi, the use of figurative palanquins spread in the course of the 20th century from Accra to other coastal towns where these palanquins, to some extent, are still used today.

== Users and manufacturers of figurative palanquins ==
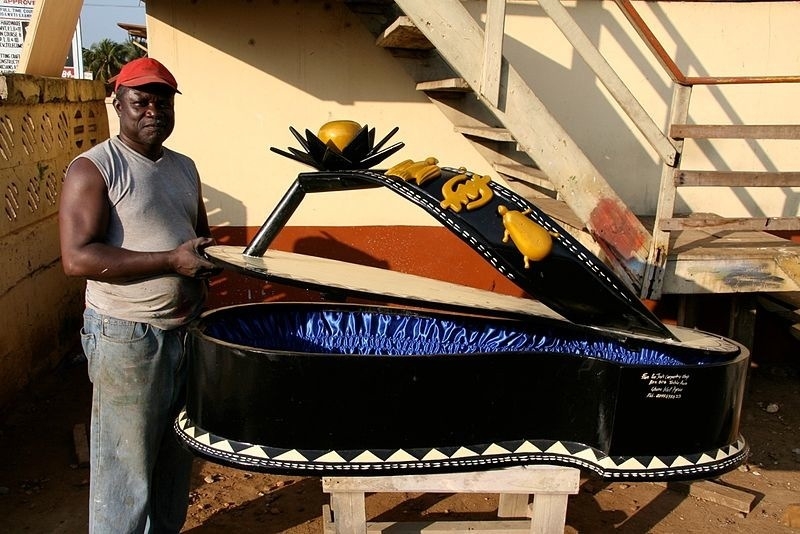
Paa Joe with a sandal coffin for the Kunstmuseum, Bern 2006

Unlike the Akan, the Ga use their palanquins only for secular sub-chiefs. Women and their highest spiritual leaders, the wulomei, do not use palanquins for different reasons.

A palanquin is made new purposely for the enstoolment of a chief and is also used for the first time during his installation ceremony. After the installation the palanquin is kept as a royal insignia hidden away in the stool house of the respective family. It is not taken out again unless needed for an important occasion, such as the Homowo festival.

Accordingly, the figurative palanquins of the Ga are very rarely shown in public and especially for foreigners they are difficult to see. Therefore, it is not surprising that although the palanquins look similar to the figurative coffins which are well known to the western art market, the figurative palanquins remained completely unknown until recently.

These palanquins are also, contrary to what was believed formerly by many researchers and even many Ga, still used and built by the same craftsmen who make the figurative coffins. One of the most important palanquin builders of the last 30 years was Paa Joe who was known until now only for his figurative coffins. But as artisans are not supposed to talk about figurative palanquins and other royal insignias, Paa Joe is not giving out easily information about the palanquins he had formerly built.

== Figurative coffins as ritual copies of palanquins ==
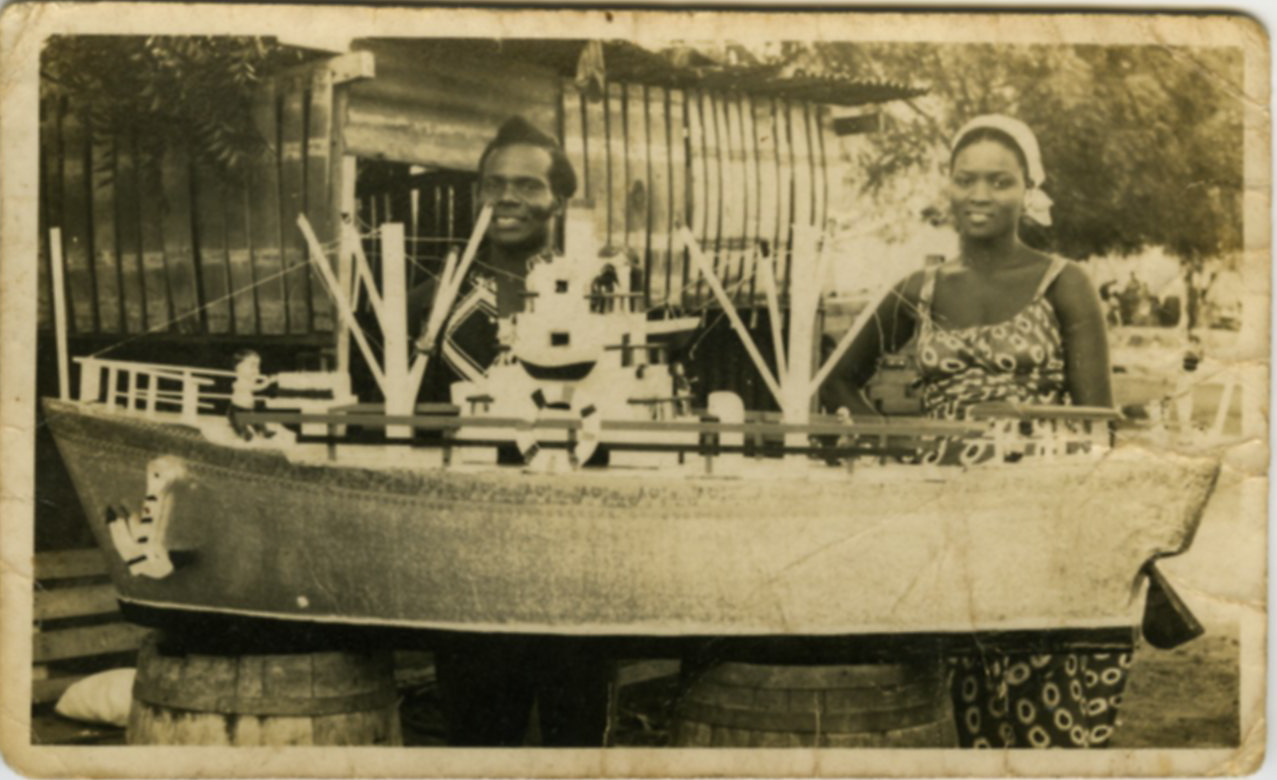
Ataa Oko with a battleship coffin made around 1960

In the Ga culture, as Regula Tschumi has discovered during her fieldwork, initiations and funerals of the traditional chiefs must complement each other. Initiates must be buried in the same way as they were set up in office or initiated. Therefore, a chief who uses a figurative palanquin had and has to be buried in a coffin that looked the same as his previously used litter. Contrary to what Thierry Secretan and others believed, no king or chief was ever buried in his figurative palanquin, because litters belong to the royal insignia, which in the Ga culture may not be buried. Consequently, those chiefs who used a figurative palanquin at their installation ceremony had to be buried in a substitute, hence in a figurative coffin, that looked the same as their palanquin.

The first figurative coffins therefore were simply copies of the palanquins which were used as a substitute.

Though outwardly similar, figurative coffins and palanquins of course belong to a different category of objects: palanquins are royal insignia made to last and to be conserved in the family house after the death of their users, while the figurative coffins may be sacrificed and are buried with the deceased. The figurative palanquin become sacred after the death of their users and the family keep them in order to maintain contact with the ancestors. For the royal families they also become distinguishing marks and function as tokens of legitimacy of their rule.

== The Western art market ==
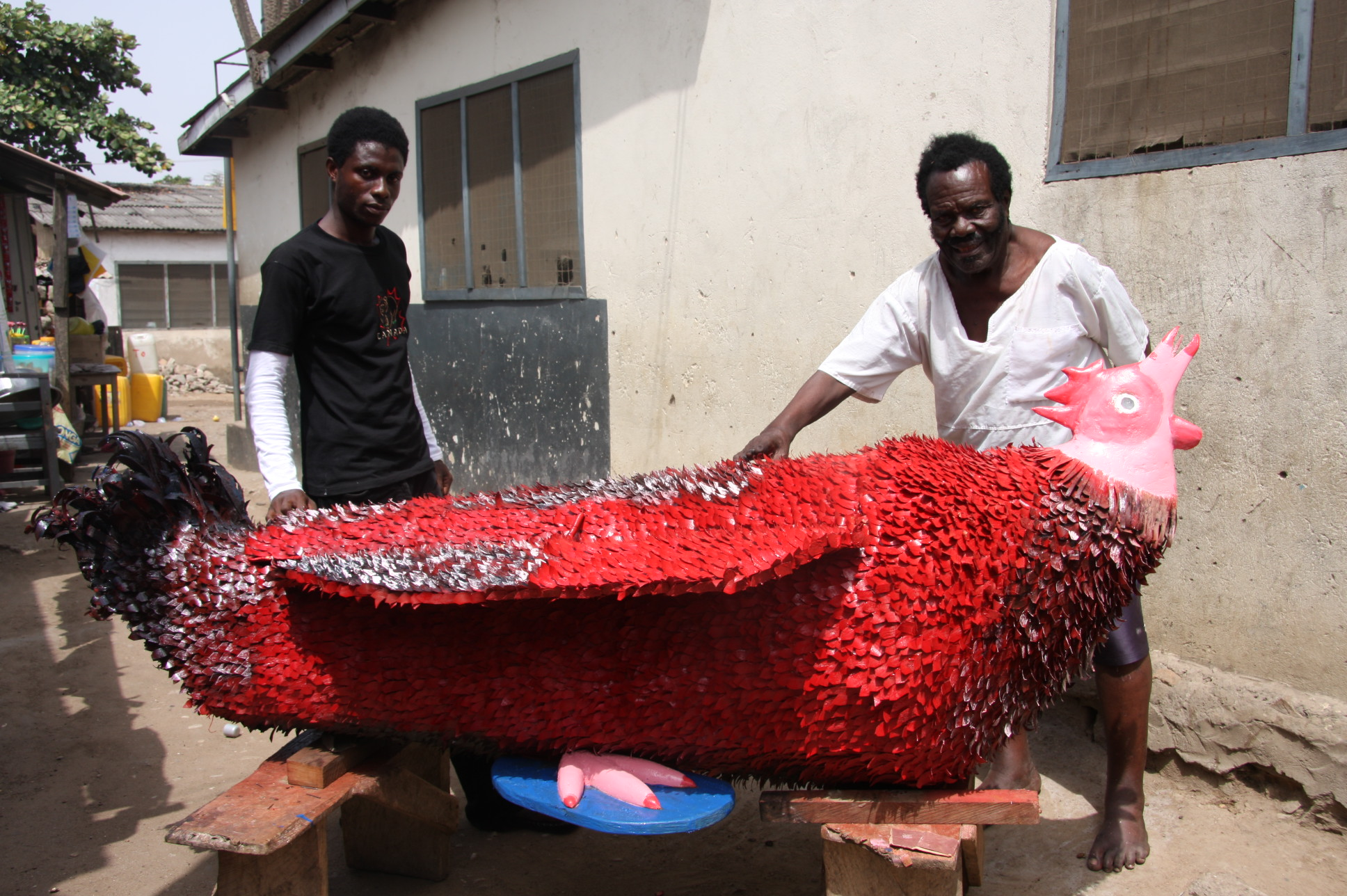
Ataa Okos called his coffins and palanquins simply "coffin-akpakai" or "coffin-palanquin". He made no difference between figurative coffins and palanquins. On the photo: Ataa Oko with the artisan Kudjoe Affutu, 2009.

While the figurative coffins of the Ga became world-famous on the Western art market, the figurative palanquins remain up to the present hidden and unknown as an art form. It was long believed that the Ga would no longer use figurative litters and the old palanquins no longer exist because as Thierry Secretan wrote, the Chiefs allegedly would have been buried in them.

The fact that even many Ga still believe that their chiefs were formerly buried in figurative palanquins can, as Regula Tschumi writes it, be explained easily: Burials of initiates formerly involved human sacrifices and, to this day, neither uninitiated nor Christian Ga would want or be allowed to attend such funerals. Chiefs are also buried secretly, therefore it is and was difficult to say how a chief is buried when it occurs in the middle of the night. Hence, nobody outside the royal families noticed that their chiefs were interred in substitute palanquins.

As a chief had to be buried the same way as he had been installed in office, it was imperative to bury him in a coffin that was the copy of his palanquin. The first figurative coffins used to bury the traditional chiefs, were therefore not a new invented art form but only the copies of the figurative palanquins.

== Ataa Oko, Kane Kwei and other coffin makers ==
The Christians and common Ga began to use figurative coffins around 1950 to 1960. As they were not allowed to use family symbols, which were still reserved for their traditional chiefs, carpenters such as Ataa Oko (1919–2012), Kane Kwei (1925–1992) and others began to produce figurative coffins avoiding the traditional totem symbols. They built coffins which did not represent forms with a deeper significance, but rather objects which were associated with the deceased's occupation.

Today all the Ga, irrespective of their religious affiliation, use figurative coffins which were formerly reserved for the traditional kings, chiefs and priests. So these coffins are now used by the broader mass of Ga people.

Since the 1970s, such coffins have been recognized by the Western art world as works of art in the Western sense. The exhibition “Les Magiciens de la terre” 1989 and the theories of Thierry Secretan caused the Teshie carpenter Kane Kwei to be acclaimed as the inventor of figurative coffins and only his products to be classified as works of art. Through lack of knowledge, the Western art world erroneously attributed the invention of a supposedly new art form to a single artist and made him and the figurative coffins world-famous, while the significance of the already existing figurative palanquins remained until recently completely unknown. Therefore, in the West the figurative coffins acquired high artistic status which in fact would have belonged to the Ga original art form, the figurative palanquins.

== Exhibitions ==
In March 2017 the Gallery ANO in Accra showed for the first time a palanquin in the exhibition "Accra: Portraits of A City". The palanquin had been made by Kudjoe Affutu in 2013 for a chief in the Central Region, Ghana.

== Bibliography ==
- Field, Margaret Joyce (1961) [1937]. Religion and Medicine of the Ga people. Oxford Univ. Press.
- Secretan, Thierry (1994). Il fait sombre, va-t'en (in French). Paris: Hazan.

Published in English as Secretan, Thierry (1995). Going into darkness: Fantastic coffins from Africa. London.

- Tschumi, Regula (2012). Die figürlichen Sänften und Särge der Ga im Süden Ghanas. Geschichte, Transformation und Sinn einer künstlerischen Ausdrucksform von den Anfängen bis in die Gegenwart (PhD thesis) (in German). Univ. Basel.
- Tschumi, Regula (2013). "The Figurative Palanquins of the Ga. History and Significance". African Arts. 46 (4): 60–73. doi:10.1162/AFAR_a_00108. S2CID 57570945.
