= Paa Joe =

Ghanaian artist (born 1947)

- Born: Joseph Tetteh-Ashong; 1947 (age 78–79); Akwapim, Ghana
- Occupations: Sculptor, carpenter

Paa Joe (né Joseph Tetteh-Ashong; born 1947) is a Ghanaian sculptor, and figurative palanquin and fantasy coffin carpenter. Joe is considered one of the most important Ghanaian coffin or abebuu adekai (“proverb boxes”) artists of his generation. He has been involved in the international art world since 1989, and has been included in major exhibitions in Europe, Japan, and the USA. His fantasy coffins are in the collections and on permanent display in many art museums worldwide, including the British Museum in London, the Brooklyn Museum in New York, the Royal Ontario Museum in Canada, the Museum of Fine Arts, Boston, the National Museum of Ethnology in Osaka and many others as well as the private collections of foreign dignitaries. Joe is building an art academy and gallery to support the community and art students across the globe.

== Biography ==
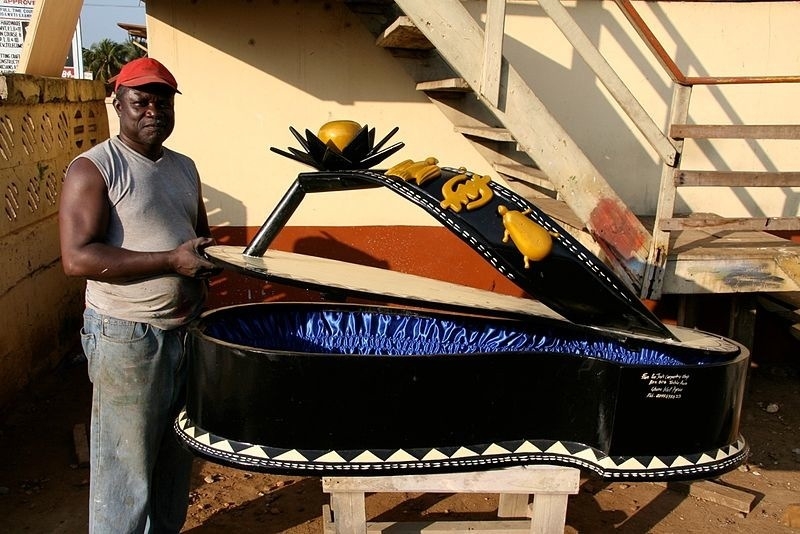
Paa Joe with a sandal coffin in collaboration with Regula Tschumi for the Kunstmuseum Berne 2006

Paa Joe was born in 1947 at Akwapim in the Eastern Region of Ghana. Joe began his career with a twelve-year apprenticeship as a coffin artist in the workshop of Kane Kwei (1924–1992) in Teshie. In 1976, Joe started his own business in Nungua. He trained many young artists like Daniel Mensah, Eric Kpakpo, and Kudjoe Affutu who have also become very successful coffin artists. In 2008, Joe moved his workshop from Nungua to Pobiman (Greater Accra) where he worked with his son Jacob and several other collaborators. In 2013, Joe was invited for a six-week residency to Nottingham, Great Britain and he has taken part in many art residences. Now, Paa Joe is retired and his son Jacob has taken over the business of his father.

== Artwork ==
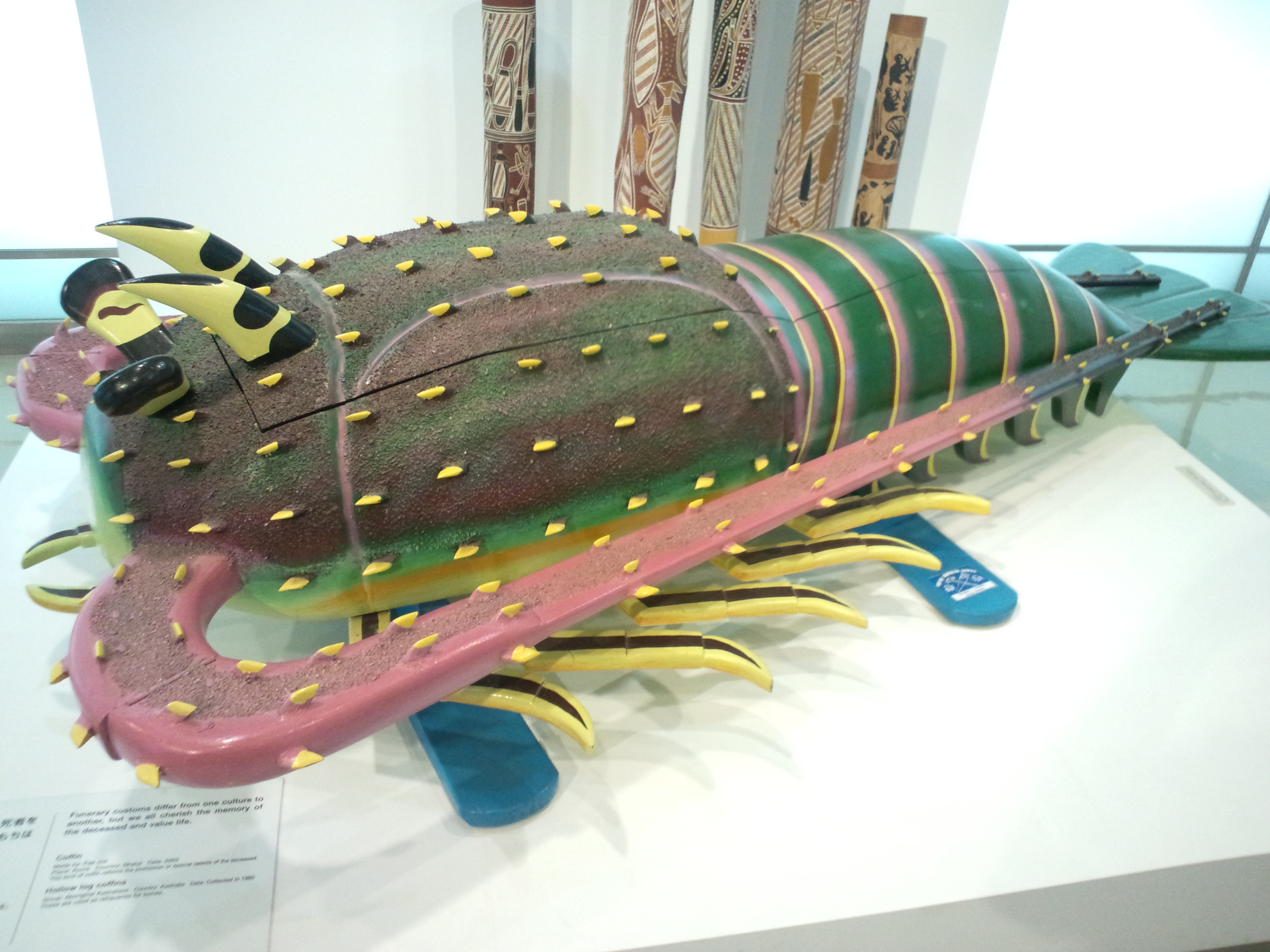
A coffin by Paa Joe exhibited at the National Museum of Ethnology in Osaka, Japan.

=== Figurative coffins ===
While the pieces crafted by Joe are real coffins that the deceased are buried in, the process to obtain a figurative coffin is very different from the normal process one might go about to obtain a coffin for themselves or a loved one. Joe does not have a catalog of work from which a figurative coffin can be chosen, as might be done with a regular coffin. Each piece is a custom commission that has relevance to the deceased's life. Thus, Joe is not a craftsman of utilitarian products, rather he is an artist of custom, expressive pieces. Not all of Joe's coffins are used for burial or intended to express the quality of an individual life.

Figurative coffins have great cultural significance in Ghana. While the practice of making Figurative coffins was debatably started by Joe's instructor, Kane Kwei, the concept has deep roots in Ga tradition. Figurative coffins have been around since the 1950s. However, figurative palanquins have a much deeper history in Ghana.

Joe has crafted custom coffins for important Ghanaian cultural figures, such as the late Chief Nii Amartey Kwei II.

=== Workshop and process ===
Joe crafts his coffins in his workshop In the Accra area in Ghana. His workshop comprises a few main areas including an office, a showroom, a preparation room for painting and shipping, and a tool storage area. However, much of the actual Coffin Construction is performed behind the workshop under the shade of trees. Here, clients can come and view coffins and decide on a design either for themselves for future use, or for a loved one. Joe's process is to explore the interests of the person in need of a coffin to determine what style of figurate coffin could best represent their life. Past examples have been as simple as a coke bottle or a bible to that of a professor who requested a bird with a pen in its mouth.

=== Other work ===
While Joe is best known for his figurative coffins, he has also created conceptual works that focus on West Africa and transatlantic slave trade, such as his large-scale sculptural work "Gates of No Return".

Joe is the subject of a documentary about fantasy coffins by British filmmaker Ben Wigley and producer Anna Griffin.

== Exhibitions ==
In 2020, the High Museum of Art in Atlanta, Georgia exhibited new work by Joe of Gold Coast fortresses. The exhibit featured seven buildings that served as the way stations for Africans who were sold into slavery, put on ships, and sent to the Americas and the Caribbean in the sixteenth through nineteenth centuries. The works are large, painted wood architectural sculptures and include the Cape Coast Castle, Fort Orange, Christiansborg Castle, Fort Patience, and Fort St. Sebastian. The process of making the works included visits to the sites, taking pictures, and drawing sketches.

=== Solo and group exhibitions ===
- 2020 "Paa Joe: Gates of No Return", High Museum of Art, Atlanta
- 2017 Gallery 1957 "One does not take it anywhere."
- 2017 Jack Shainman Gallery "The Coffins of Paa Joe and the Pursuit of Happiness."
- 2017 Fondation Cartier Paris
- 2012 Brooklyn Museum
- 2012 Southbank, UK
- 2011 Salon 94 New York
- 2011 Jack Bell Gallery, UK
- 2011 V&A museum UK
- 2010–11 "Living and Dying Gallery" British Museum London
- 2007–2008 Six Feet Under, Deutsches Hygiene-Museum, Dresden
- 2006 Melbourne Festival
- 2006 Six Feet Under, Kunstmuseum Bern
- 2005 Jack Shainman Gallery, New York City
- 2003 Schokolade, die süsse Verführung, Museum für Völkerkunde Basel
- 2002 Autolust, Stapferhaus Lenzburg, Switzerland
- 1989 Les Magiciens de la terre, Centre Pompidou, Paris
