= African Arts (journal) =

Academic journal founded in 1967

- Discipline: African art
- Language: English

Publication details
- History: 1967–present
- Publisher: MIT Press (United States)
- Frequency: Quarterly

Standard abbreviations
- ISO 4: Afr. Arts

Indexing
- ISSN: 0001-9933 (print); 1937-2108 (web)
- JSTOR: 00019933
- OCLC no.: 1461383

Links
- Journal homepage; Online access

African Arts is a peer-reviewed academic journal devoted to the study and discussion of traditional, contemporary, and popular African arts. It was founded in 1967 and is published online and in hard copy by the MIT Press, which distributes the journal for the James S. Coleman African Studies Center at the University of California, Los Angeles.
