= Collection de l'art brut =

Outsider art museum in Lausanne, Switzerland

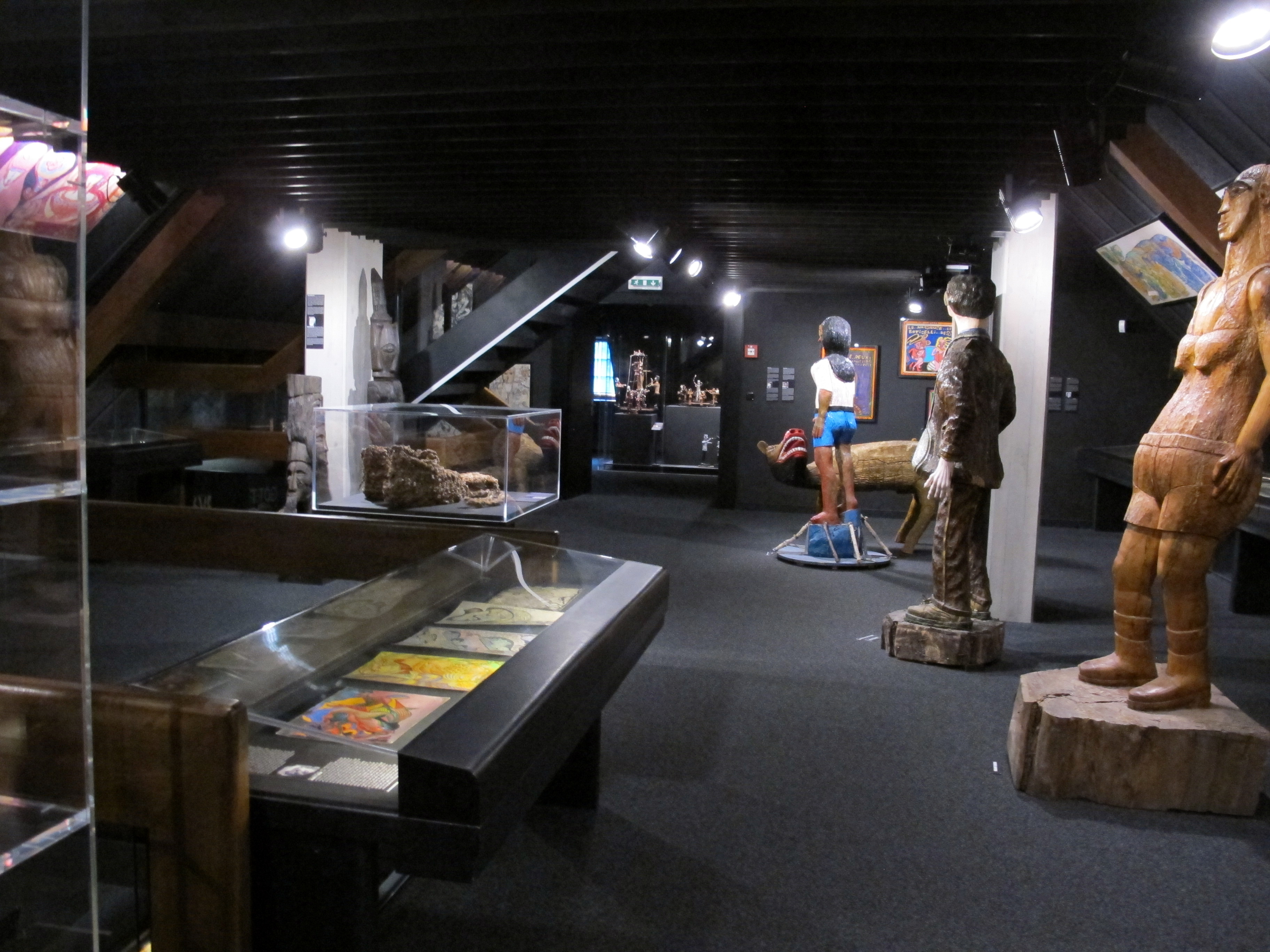
- View, inside the museum (2014)

- Location in Switzerland
- Established: 1976
- Location: Lausanne, Switzerland
- Coordinates: 46.527485°N 6.624743°E
- Public transit access: Jomini ou Beaulieu (bus line 2 and 21); Beaulieu (bus line 3)
- Website: Official website

The Collection de l'art brut (literally "collection of raw art"; and sometimes referred to as "Musée de l'Art Brut") is an art museum dedicated to outsider art located in Lausanne, Switzerland.

== See also ==
- American Visionary Art Museum
- List of museums in Switzerland
- Auguste Marie
