= List of Ghanaian artists =

The following list of Ghanaian artists (in alphabetical order by last name) includes artists of various genres, who are notable and are either born in Ghana, of Ghanaian descent or who produce works that are primarily about Ghana.

== A ==
- Felicia Abban (born 1935), photographer; Ghana's first female professional photographer
- Bright Tetteh Ackwerh, sculptor
- Betty Acquah (born 1965), painter of feminist themes
- Frances Ademola (born 1928), artist, gallery owner, and former broadcaster; she had also lived in Nigeria
- Eric Adjetey Anang, sculptor and fantasy coffin carpenter
- Kudjoe Affutu (born 1985), sculptor, figurative coffin carpenter, and palanquin builder
- Ben Agbee (born 1966), painter
- Cephas Yao Agbemenu (born 1951), sculptor and a traditional African wood carver, educator
- Joseph Kossivi Ahiator (born 1956), painter and voodoo artist
- Bernard Akoi-Jackson (born 1979), installation artist, performance artist, video artist, photographer, dancer, poet, and academic
- Kwame Akoto (born 1950), painter
- Kwame Akoto-Bamfo (born 1983), sculptor with a focus on restorative justice
- Dorothy Amenuke (born 1968), sculptor, fiber artist, and educator
- Oku Ampofo (1908–1998), sculptor, medical doctor
- El Anatsui (born 1944), Ghanaian sculptor; lives in Nigeria
- Kwadwo Ani (born 1966), painter
- Anita-Pearl Ankor, painter, muralist
- Kofi Antubam (1922–1964), artist and designer
- Philip Kwame Apagya (born 1958), portrait photographer
- Samuel Prophask Asamoah (born 1981), painter
- Oscar Korbla Mawuli Awuku (born 1999), body artist, painter, and sculptor

== B ==
- James Barnor (born 1929), Ghanaian photographer based in London
- Fatric Bewong, painter, mixed media artist
- Amoako Boafo (born 1984), painter
- Osei Bonsu (1900–1977), sculptor and Ashanti carver
- Enam Bosokah, ballpoint pen artist
- Kobina Bucknor (1925–1975), painter, animal scientist

== C ==
- Serge Attukwei Clottey (born 1985), installation artist, performance, artist photographer and sculptor
- James Cudjoe (born 1971), painter

== D ==
- Kenturah Davis (born 1980), drawer, sculptor, performance artist, installation artist; she has lived in the US and Ghana
- Godfried Donkor (born 1964), painter, collagist, and mixed-media artist; lives in London, of Ghanaian ancestry
- Kimathi Donkor (born 1965), painter; lives in London, of Ghanaian ancestry
- Kofi Dawson (1940–2021), modernist multidisciplinary visual artist

== G ==
- Ablade Glover (born 1934), painter and educator
- Eric Gyamfi (born 1990), photographer focused on queer portraits
- Prince Gyasi (born 1995), photographer

== J ==
- Paa Joe (born 1947), Ga sculptor, figurative palanquin, fantasy coffin carpenter

== K ==
- Vincent Kofi (1923–1974), modernist sculptor, academic
- Amon Kotei (1915–2011), sculptor, painter, musician, surveyor, and graphic designer
- Wiz Kudowor (born 1957), painter, sculptor
- Josephine Kuuire, photographer, digital artist, graphic designer, and activist
- Atta Kwami (1956–2021), painter, printmaker, independent art historian, and curator
- Grace Kwami (1923–2006), sculptor and educator

== M ==
- Ibrahim Mahama (born 1987), painter, sculptor, and author
- Daniel Mensah (born 1968), Ga sculptor and fantasy coffin carpenter
- Rojo Mettle-Nunoo, painter, sculptor, and politician

== N ==
- Kobina Nyarko (born 1972), painter

== O ==
- Nana Oforiatta Ayim, art historian, curator, filmmaker, writer; Ghanaian-born and has lived in England and Germany
- Ataa Oko (c. 1919–2012), sculptor, builder of figurative palanquins, and figurative fantasy coffins
- Theodosia Okoh (1922–2015), teacher and designer of Ghana's national flag
- Albert Opoku (1915–2002), printmaker, painter, choreographer, and dancer
- Zohra Opoku (born 1976), German-born Ghanaian textile artist and photographer
- Owusu-Ankomah (1956–2025), contemporary painter

== S ==
- Kąrî'kạchä Seid'ou, academic and artist
- Kofi Setordji (born 1957), multidisciplinary visual artist
- Theophilus Nii Anum Sowah (born 1968), sculptor, figurative palanquin and fantasy coffin carpenter
- Ray Styles (1988–2020), draftsman, drawer
- Constance Swaniker (born 1973), sculptor and carpenter, educator, and entrepreneur

== U ==
- Isaac Chukwu Udeh (born 1997), painter, live painter, and performance artist

== V ==
- Vudumane, singer, rapper and songwriter

== W ==
- Rikki Wemega-Kwawu (born 1959), painter

== Y ==
- Lynette Yiadom-Boakye (born 1977), British painter and writer, of Ghanaian heritage

== Z ==
- David Kwaku Ziga (1922–?), politician and potter

== See also ==
- List of Ghanaian Americans
- List of Ghanaian painters
- List of Ghanaian women artists
- Ghanaian art
