= List of Ghanaian women artists =

This is a list of women artists who were born in Ghanaian, of Ghanaian descent, or whose artworks are closely associated with that country.

== A ==
- Felicia Abban (born 1935), photographer; Ghana's first female professional photographer
- Betty Acquah (born 1965), painter of feminist themes
- Frances Ademola (born 1928), artist, gallery owner, and former broadcaster; she had also lived in Nigeria
- Dorothy Amenuke (born 1968), sculptor, fiber artist, and educator
- Anita-Pearl Ankor, painter, muralist

== B ==
- Fatric Bewong, painter, mixed media artist

== D ==
- Kenturah Davis (born 1980), drawer, sculptor, performance artist, installation artist; she has lived in the US and Ghana

== K ==
- Grace Kwami (1923–2006), sculptor and educator

== O ==
- Nana Oforiatta Ayim, art historian, curator, filmmaker, writer; Ghanaian-born and has lived in England and Germany
- Zohra Opoku, German-born Ghanaian textile artist and photographer

== S ==
- Constance Swaniker (born 1973), sculptor and carpenter, educator, and entrepreneur

== Y ==
- Lynette Yiadom-Boakye (born 1977), British painter and writer, of Ghanaian heritage

== See also ==
- Ghanaian art
- List of Ghanaian artists
- List of Ghanaian painters
