= Project 1975 =

Dutch project

Project 1975 started in 2010 as a two-year project based in the Netherlands with the intent to explore the relationships between contemporary art and postcolonialism. Through this project Stedelijk Museum Bureau Amsterdam (SMBA) explored the role of art and visual culture in the context of colonial practices. The project consisted of multiple exhibitions, seminars, reading groups, articles, and a blog. "1975" in the title refers to the year that Suriname gained independence (the independent Republic of Suriname was founded in 1975) and the Netherlands thus became to some extent "postcolonial".

The project broadened SMBA’s focus, traditionally on artists based in Amsterdam, to include artists and people who were new to the city but wanted to contribute to the artistic and cultural environment. Consequently, themes that had not previously been addressed in art institutions in Amsterdam found a place to be discussed at SMBA. Many questions were raised in this project. Artists and critics responded to questions such as "Do colonial mindsets persist in art and in its institutions?".

== Exhibitions ==
Exhibitions that took place in the context of Project 1975 were: "See Reason", "Identity Bluffs", "The Marx Lounge", "Mounira Al Solh & Bassam Ramlawi", "Informality, Art, Economy & Precarity", " Vincent Vulsma - A Sign of Autumn ", "The Jinn - Tala Madani", "Any other Business – Nicoline van Harskamp", "Bart Groenendaal, Stefan Ruitenbeek, Quinsy Gario", "The Memories are Present", "Time, Trade & Travel" and finally "Hollandaise - a Journey into an Iconic Fabric".

The project was finalized with a publication, Project 1975. Contemporary Art and the Postcolonial Unconscious, which includes (visual) documentation of the project, interviews between the curators and artists and essays.

=== The Memories are Present ===
The Memories are Present and the video programme Really Exotic ran from 16 June to 12 August 2012 and was curated by Kerstin Winking (SMBA). The participating artists in the exhibition were Artun Alaska Arasli, Pauline M’barek and Christoph Westermeier. The focus in this exhibition was on the museum as a bearer and communicator of knowledge and interrogated institutional divisions. Central attention was paid to the ways in which different institutions collect, categorise and display objects. The exhibition challenged the binary oppositions still prevalent in many institutions between "art objects" and "ethnographic objects". The video programme Really Exotic focused on the notion of the exotic experience. Presented were works that could convey or tell the viewer more about this type of experience. The videoprogram was organised by Joram Kraaijeveld and Kerstin Winking (SMBA) in collaboration with Marthe Singelenberg (Filmtheater Kriterion).

=== Time, Trade & Travel ===
The exhibition Time, Trade & Travel took place from 25 August to 21 October 2012 and was organized in collaboration with the Nubuke Foundation, Accra, Ghana. Participating artists were: Bernard Akoi-Jackson, Dorothy Akpene Amenuke, Serge Clottey, Zachary Formwalt, Iris Kensmil, Aukje Koks, Navid Nuur, Jeremiah Quarshie, kąrî’kạchä seidóu, Katarina Zdjelar. It was the result of an active exchange of knowledge between artists and curators from SMBA and the Nubuke Foundation, Accra. The curators from both institutions as well as the participating artists visited each other in their work and cultural environment. The title of this exhibition refers to the complicated aspects of international trade and traffic with their capitalist forces and influence on life and art. The participating artists in this exhibition set out to discover historical encounters between Africans and Europeans, the subsequent trade and cultural relationships that evolved from these contacts and the extent to which these cultural and economic relationships are still of influence today. The exhibition travelled on to the Nubuke Foundation in Accra, Ghana.

The exhibition was curated by: Jelle Bouwhuis and Kerstin Winking (Stedelijk Museum Bureau Amsterdam), Kofi Setordji and Odile Tevie (Nubuke Foundation). Time, Trade & Travel was made possible in part by contributions from the Mondrian Fund, the Amsterdam Fund for the Arts, HIVOS and SNS REAAL Fund.

=== Hollandaise - a Journey into an Iconic Fabric ===
The exhibition Hollandaise: a journey into an iconic fabric took place at SMBA from 30 November 2012 to 6 January 2013. The exhibition travelled on to Raw Material Company, Dakar (Senegal), where it was on view from 10 April – 1 June 2013.

The curator for this exhibition was Koyo Kouoh. Participating artists in this exhibition were Godfried Donkor, Abdoulaye Konaté, Wendelien van Oldenborgh, Willem de Rooij, Billie Zangewa.

For this exhibition Kouoh commissioned five artists, all working in the medium of textile, in Europe and Africa to make new works on the subject of "Hollandaise" or "Dutch wax", (Note: In Francophone African countries, this material is known as Hollandaise, a reference to its origin in Holland.) the colourful wax print fabrics that are most often regarded as typically African. In the context of this exhibition a catalogue, edited by Kouoh, and an SMBA Newsletter were published.
