= Kobina =

Kobina is a Ghanaian name. It is also the female form of the East Slavic surname Kobin. Notable people with this name include:

- Frank Kobina Parkes (1932–2004), Ghanaian journalist and poet
- Isaac Kobina Abban (1933–2001), Ghanaian judge
- John Kobina Richardson (1936-2010), Ghanaian industrialist
- Kobina Arku Korsah (1894–1967), Ghanaian judge
- Kobina Nyarko, Ghanaian artist
- Kobina Sekyi (1892–1956), Ghanaian lawyer and politician
- Kobina Tahir Hammond, Ghanaian lawyer and politician
- Samuel Kobina Annim, Ghanaian academic
- Kobina Daniel Gwira, Ghanaian diplomat
