= Francis Nii Yartey =

Ghanaian choreographer, dancer and professor (1946–2015)

Francis Nii Yartey (1946–2015) was a Ghanaian choreographer, dancer, and professor. He was the second director of the Ghana National Ensemble, succeeding Professor Albert Mawere Opoku.

== Education and career ==
Yartey earned a certificate and diploma at the University of Ghana in 1968 and 1971 respectively. At the university, he came under many Ghanaian practitioner-researchers including J.H. Nketia, Efua Sutherland and Albert Opoku Mawere. He then studied for a Master of Arts degree at the University of Illinois and was awarded the degree in 1975.

A year after earning his master's degree, he took over as the Artistic Director/Choreographer of the Ghana Dance Ensemble. He remained so until 1993 when the ensemble moved to the National Theatre. The group was renamed the National Dance Company. He continued his role with the group until 2006 when he retired.

Yartey became an associate professor at the University of Ghana in 2006. He left for Swarthmore University, Pennsylvania, US, where he taught for a year. Back in Ghana, he taught at Ashesi University College as an adjunct professor. He returned to the School of Performing Arts (SPA) at the University of Ghana, becoming the head of the Department of Dance Studies.

== Honours ==
In 2000, Yartey was awarded the Grand Medal (Civil Division) for his contribution to the development of dance in his beloved country Ghana.

== Notable works ==
Between 1999 and 2008, he choreographed the opening and closing ceremonies of international football tournaments that Ghana hosted. This includes the 2008 African Cup of Nations.

== Death ==
Yartey died in India while on tour with a group of dancers.
