= Lynching of Elizabeth Lawrence =

1933 lynching of an African-American woman in Alabama

- Location: Birmingham, Alabama, U.S.
- Date: July 1933; 93 years ago
- Attack type: Murder by shooting
- Victim: Elizabeth Lawrence
- Perpetrators: Mob of white residents in Birmingham, Alabama
- Motive: Anti-black racism, retaliation against Lawrence for scolding white children who threw rocks at her
- Charges: None

Elizabeth Lawrence was an African-American woman who was lynched by a mob in Birmingham, Alabama, in early July 1933. Lawrence, a schoolteacher and mother, was targeted after she verbally reprimanded a group of white children who had been throwing stones at her. Following her murder, her home was burned to the ground, and her son fled to Boston to escape further violence.

== Lynching ==
In late June or early July 1933, Lawrence was walking along a country road approximately five miles from her home when a group of young white children began taunting her and throwing rocks and dirt. Lawrence responded by scolding the children, an act that was a major social transgression within the racial hierarchy of the Jim Crow South.

On the night of the murder in early July (many sources reporting July 5, 1933), a mob consisting of the children's parents and other local residents surrounded Lawrence's home. Lawrence was shot and killed, and then her house was burned to the ground; historians note it is probable she was still inside the residence during the fire.

== Aftermath ==
Lawrence's son, Alexander, was not present during the attack. When he returned and attempted to file a report regarding his mother's murder with the Jefferson County law enforcement, a mob re-gathered and threatened to kill him as well. Fearing for his life, Alexander fled to Boston. He was one of an estimated six million African Americans who left the South during the Great Migration to escape racial violence.

In July 1933, the International Labor Defense (ILD) opened an investigation into the killing. While Black newspapers such as the Chicago Defender and the Baltimore Afro-American reported on the witness accounts, no charges were ever brought against the members of the mob.

== Legacy ==
Lawrence is one of several dozen documented lynching victims in Jefferson County, Alabama. The story of her lynching was made part of the permanent record at the National Memorial for Peace and Justice in Montgomery, Alabama.
