= Cudjoe (disambiguation) =

Cudjoe may refer to:

- Cudjoe (c. 1680–1744), Jamaican Maroon leader
- Cudjoe (name)
- Cudjoe Key, Florida, unincorporated community in Monroe County, Florida
- Cudjoe Key Air Force Station, Formerly Used Defense Site
