= Kofi Dawson =

Ghanaian modernist artist (1940–2021)

Galle Winston Kofi Dawson (1940–2021), was a Ghanaian modernist visual artist. His range of works included paintings, sculptures, texts, drawings, printmaking, and installation art.

== Early life and education ==
Dawson was one of the thirteen children of Ghanaian architect Wilberforce David Kwami Dawson and Evelyn Esi Dawson. He attended Mawuli School in Ho for his secondary school education. Before Mawuli, he attended O'Reilly School and Bana Hill Presbyterian Boys Boarding School. One of his art teachers at Mawuli School was Grace Kwami Thereafter, he went to the then Kumasi College of Technology (KCT) to study diploma in Civil Engineering. He, however, dropped out and joined the teaching specialist Diploma in Fine Art (DFA) class.

When the Kwame Nkrumah University of Science and Technology (KNUST) BA Art Degree (Painting) began in 1964, Dawson was part of the first cohort of three students. After KNUST, Dawson attended the Slade School of Fine Art in London on a British Council 8-month Technical Award. At Slade, he learnt and mastered the basics of painting on canvas as well as screen printing.

== Career ==
Dawson was an apprentice of Ghanaian modernist master and designer of the national emblem Amon Kotei. At Victoriaburg Press, Kotei taught Dawson engraving and the colour separation process. After Dawson's retirement from Ghana's Information Services Department in 2000, he devoted much of his time to his art practice. He became the first artist to show at the Nubuke Foundation gallery in 2009. Dawson was the subject of a large retrospective at the Ghanaian artist Ibrahim Mahama initiated Savannah Centre for Contemporary Art, Tamale.

== Exhibitions ==
=== Solo exhibitions (selected) ===
Galle Winston Kofi Dawson: In Pursuit of something ‘Beautiful’, perhaps…” curated by Bernard Akoi-Jackson Savannah Centre for Contemporary Art, Tamale (2019)

Nutata: drawings by GWK Dawson’ Nubuke Foundation, Accra (2009)

=== Group exhibitions (selected) ===
World Mini-Print Annual Lessedra Bulgaria (2006)

Made in Africa Diaspora Conference, UK (2006)

Origin Sankofa Dubois Museum, Accra (2005)

7th Triennale Mondial de liestampe petit format Chamalers, France (2005)

== Death ==
Dawson died in 2021 after a short period of sickness.
