= Cudjoe (name) =

Cudjoe is both a masculine given name and surname. Notable people with the name include:

== Given name ==
- Cudjoe (c. 1680 – 1744), Jamaican Maroon leader
- Cudjoe Lewis (1841–July 17, 1935), American slave

== Surname ==
- James Cudjoe (born 1971), Ghanaian artist
- Joseph Cudjoe (footballer) (born 1995), Ghanaian footballer
- Leroy Cudjoe (born 1988), English rugby league player
- Mathew Anim Cudjoe (born 2003), Ghanaian footballer (Dundee United FC)
- Sampson Cudjoe (born 1988), Ghanaian footballer
- Selwyn Cudjoe (born 1943), Trinidadian academic
- Vera Cudjoe (born 1928), Trinidadian-Canadian actress, producer, and educator

== See also ==
- Akan names
- Codjoe
