= Stedelijk Museum Bureau Amsterdam =

Stedelijk Museum Bureau Amsterdam (SMBA) is a project space for contemporary art in Amsterdam, Netherlands. SMBA was founded in 1993 and is part of the Stedelijk Museum Amsterdam. It is the uccessor of Museum Fodor, a platform for young Amsterdam artists that ceased to exist in 1992. The goals of SMBA are to stimulate and signal contemporary art in Amsterdam and to create an international stage for this. SMBA organizes eight to ten solo and group exhibitions annually. The current head of Stedelijk Museum Bureau Amsterdam is Jelle Bouwhuis.

== Activities ==
SMBA is situated at Rozenstraat 59 in Amsterdam. Apart from exhibitions other activities such as lectures, debates and (book) presentations are held here. Throughout the city of Amsterdam different projects that were made possible by SMBA take place. Examples of such projects are the residency programme BijlmAIR (in collaboration with Centrum Beeldende Kunst Zuidoost) and Artist in Residence Zuidas. Artists are invited to live and work for six months in one of the residencies and to make a work that reflects on aspects of that part of the city. SMBA is also involved with Stichting Postivisme, a programme foundation that stimulates the production and development of electronic, audiovisual, and performance art and new media.

== Publications ==
On the occasion of the tenth anniversary of SMBA '10 Years SMBA, We Show Art' was published. This publication contained SMBA's newsletters until the end of 2003. The SMBA newsletter is published six times a year and gives explanation on current projects. It contains contributions by national and international specialists in the field. Some exhibitions are, apart from the newsletter, accompanied by book publications.

== Exhibitions ==
=== Project 1975 ===
Project 1975 started in 2010 as a two-year project with the intent to explore the relationships between contemporary art and postcolonialism. In this project the role of art and visual culture in the context of colonial practices was explored. The project consisted of multiple exhibitions, seminars, reading groups, articles, and a blog. "1975" refers to the year that Suriname gained independence (the independent Republic of Surinam was founded in 1975) and the Netherlands thus became to some extent "post-colonial". In relation to the project it refers to the unsettled issues that arose from colonialism and the problematic aspects of the term "postcolonialism". The project broadened SMBA's focus, traditionally on artists based in Amsterdam, to include artists and people who were new to the city but wanted to contribute to the artistic and cultural environment. Consequently, themes that had not previously been addressed in art institutions in Amsterdam found a place to be discussed at SMBA. Many questions were raised in this project. Artists and critics responded to questions such as "Do colonial mindsets persist in art and in its institutions?".

Exhibitions in the framework of Project 1975

- See Reason
- Identity Bluffs
- The Marx Lounge
- Mounira Al Solh & Bassam Ramlawi
- Informality, Art, Economy & Precarity
- A Sign of Autumn – Vincent Vulsma
- The Jinn - Tala Madani
- Any other Business – Nicoline van Harskamp
- Bart Groenendaal, Stefan Ruitenbeek, Quinsy Gario
- The Memories are Present
- Time, Trade & Travel
- Hollandaise - a Journey into an Iconic Fabric

=== Global collaborations ===
Global Collaborations is a three-year program that is carried out between Stedelijk Museum and its project space: SMBA. The project aims to embrace the non-western manifestations in contemporary art and at the same time links with local and western practices. Global collaborations is based on equality as a main factor of representation, and focuses on collaboration with artists, and encourages the dialogue with experimental institutions and art initiatives in their places of origin. It investigates alternative models for museums to relate with contemporary art, giving more and more importance to the exchange of knowledge and equality on the collaborations.

Global collaborations was initiated in 2013 by Jelle Bouwhuis and Kerstin Winking. The project consists of a number of exhibitions and collaborations that took place between Stedelijk Museum, SMBA and different alternative spaces worldwide. The project will continue until the end of 2015.

Collecting Geographies

Collecting Geographies was a three-day conference that took place at Stedelijk Museum as part of Global Collaborations program and it was made in collaboration with ASCA/ACGS at the University of Amsterdam, Moderna Museet (Stockholm), Folkwang Museum (Essen), and the Tropenmuseum (Amsterdam). The conference consisted of a number of public keynote lectures, panel discussions and lectures, which were divided by theme on the different days. The papers were selected from an open call that got a huge response from artists, curators, sociologists, and others.

Exhibitions in the framework of Global Collaborations

- Made in Commons
- This is the Time. This is the Record of the Time.
- How Far, How Near
- Zachary Formwalt – Three exchanges
- Resolution 287
- Tromarama
- Kamarado
