= Kofi Setordji =

Ghanaian artist (born 1957

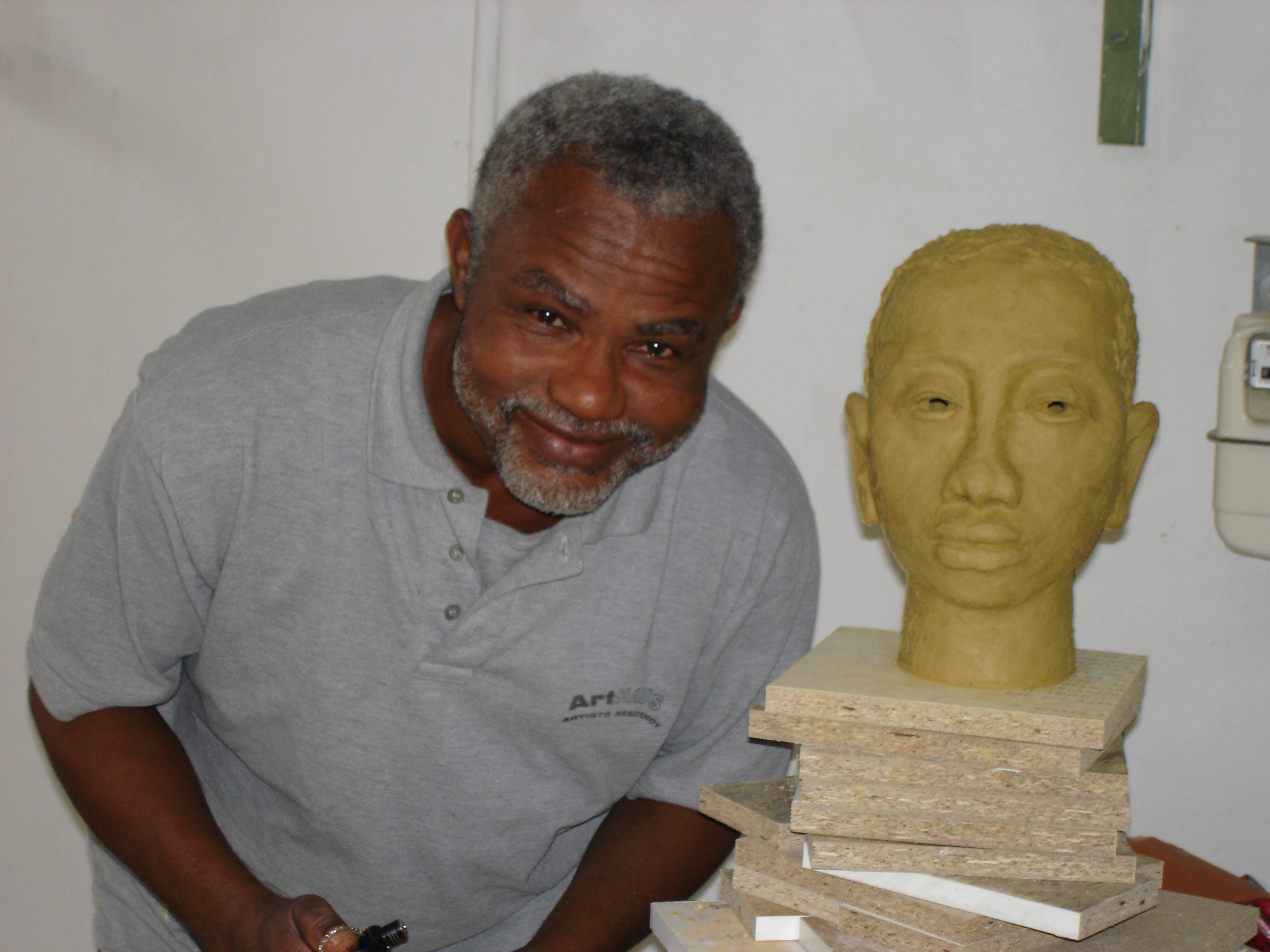
- Kofi Setordji 2005
- Born: Kofi Setordji; 1957 (age 67–68); Ghana
- Education: Accra Methodist Secondary School
- Occupation: Artist

Kofi Setordji (born 1957) is a multidisciplinary visual artist based in Ghana. His works range from graphic design, textile designing, sculpture and painting.

== Education and career ==
Setordji was born in 1957 in Accra. He attended Methodist Secondary School in Accra after which he trained as a commercial artist. He was an apprentice of Ghanaian cartoonist Ghanatta Yaw Boakye. From 1984 to 1987, Setordji apprenticed with Ghanaian artist and dramatist Saka Acquaye. He started working in sandstone in 1985 and started showing his works in Accra. He has since shown in France, Italy, Denmark, Germany, Austria, South Africa and the United States.

Apart from his artistic practice, Setordji is a mentor to many young contemporary artists practicing in Accra. He founded Arthaus, a residency program for artists. In addition, he is a co-founder and former creative director of Nubuke Foundation, a contemporary art space in Accra.

== Notable works ==
Setordji's most famous art is the Genocide, a multidimensional installation (wood, metal, recycled objects and paint) that he created as a response to the 1994 Rwandan Genocide. The work was made between 1998 and 2000 and comprised about 300 pieces which included a scene of a war tribunal. In the middle sat a judge. On the side were defence and prosecuting lawyers. The work was shown at the 2000 edition of Dakar Biennale.

Setordji's 5-meter high sculpture commissioned by the city of Accra stands in front of the National Theatre of Ghana. The work is titled Entre Amies.

== Awards and honours ==
Setordji won the Leisure Award Sculptor of the Year prize in 1990. In 2018, he received The Rockefeller Foundation's Bellagio Creative Arts Fellowship. Setordji was the subject of a retrospective exhibition at Nubuke Foundation in 2012.

== Exhibitions ==
- Prête-moi ton Rêve (Lend me your dream) 2019-2020
- New Threads 2016
- Kunsthalle Wien Museumsquartier 2004-2005
- Art Cologne 1996, Koelnmesse GmbH in Cologne 1996
