= Nubuke Foundation =

Art foundation in Ghana

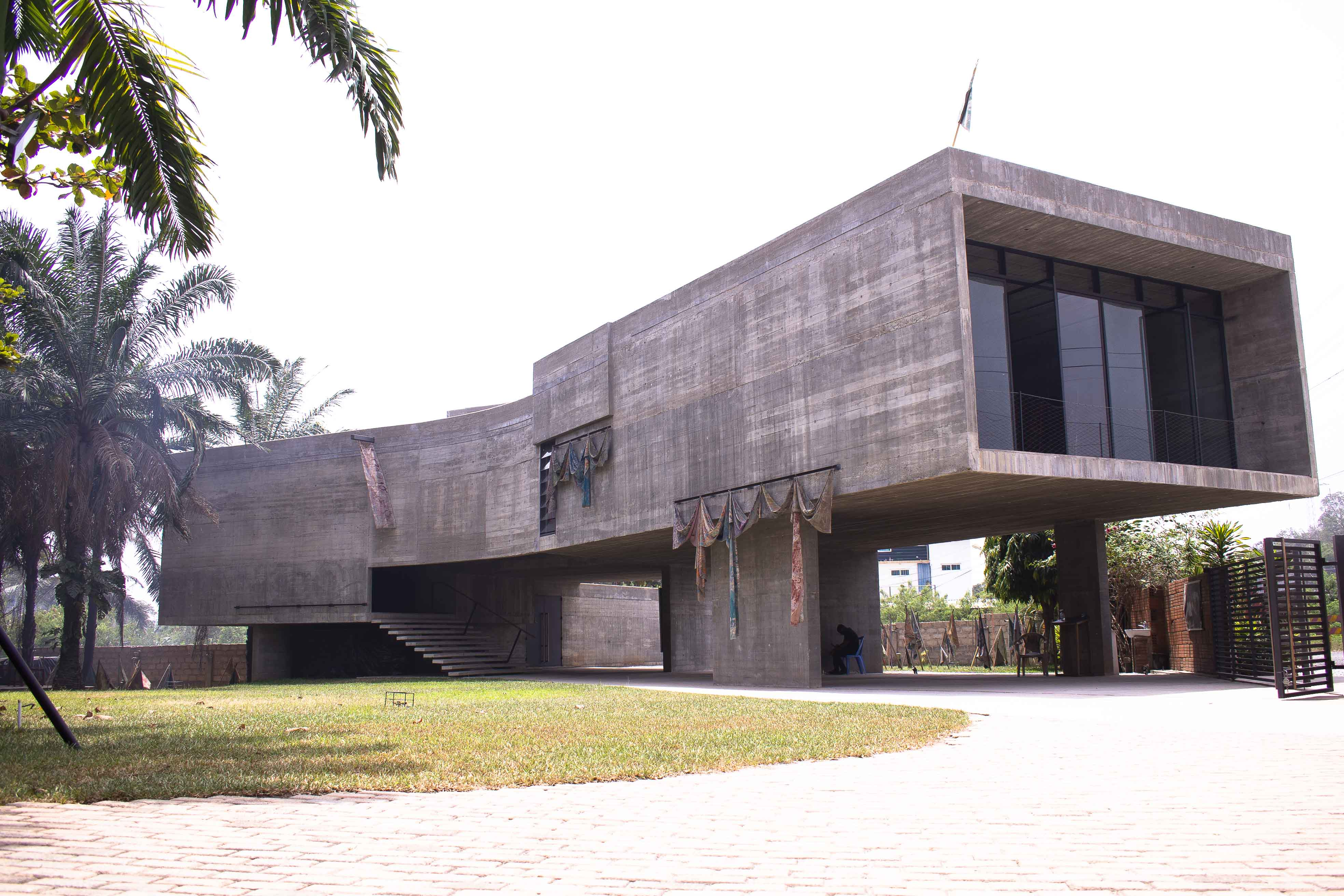
- Established: April 2006
- Location: 7 Lome Close, Accra
- Coordinates: 5.636564°N 0.174566°W
- Directors: Odile Tevie, Director
- Website: www.nubukefoundation.org

Nubuke Foundation is an art foundation in East Legon in the Greater Accra Region of Ghana. It was established in April 2006. The Foundation serves as a connection or a link for preserving, recording and promoting contemporary arts and culture.

== Exhibitions ==
=== Time, Trade & Travel ===
The Time, Trade & Travel took place at Stedelijk Museum Bureau Amsterdam from 25 August to 21 October 2012 in Amsterdam, Netherlands, in the context of Project 1975 and was organised in collaboration with the Nubuke Foundation, Accra, Ghana. Under the broad umbrella of a title-Time, Trade & Travel, the history of Ghana's encounter with the Netherlands was being examined by 4 Ghanaian and 5 Dutch artists (Bernard Akoi-Jackson, Dorothy Akpene Amenuke, Serge Attukwei Clottey, Zachary Formwalt, Iris Kensmil, Aukje Koks, Navid Nuur, Jeremiah Quarshie, kari-kacha seid’ou and Katarina Zdjelar). The Foundation has done 10 successful exhibitions throughout the passed years from 2016 to 2025. It also currently holds regular performing art programs; poetry and drama. The drama is held on every last Sunday of the month.

=== Du Bois in Our Time ===
An exhibition on the legacy of W.E.B. Du Bois organised by University Museum of Contemporary Art, University of Massachusetts Amherst, Massachusetts in 2012 in collaboration with Nubuke Foundation
