= Ben Agbee =

Ghanaian artist (born 1966)

- Born: 1966 (age 59–60); Ghana
- Citizenship: Ghanaian
- Occupation: Artist

Benjamin Agbenyega, known as Ben Agbee (born 1966), is a Ghanaian painter who integrates traditional Ghanaian cultural motifs with contemporary artistic expressions.

== Early life and education ==
Agbee is the first of three children born to Emmanuel Agbenyega. He graduated from college in 1989 majoring in Art. Ben Agbee graduated from Ghanatta College of Art and Design.

== Career ==
After graduation, Agbee continued to paint while he worked in advertising and design.

Working mostly in acrylic on canvas, Agbee focuses almost exclusively on the subject of African women, usually in profile, often drawing on two different motifs for their depiction. Some works, such as Wait A Minute, show them talking in groups, and are characterized by intricate detail of symbols embedded in their clothing or the canvas background. Others, such as Migration, feature the dark, clean profiles of these women on backgrounds of colorful, geometric shapes, somewhat evocative of sand dunes.

Agbee has participated in several collective and individual exhibitions in Accra, Ghana, Netherlands, United States, New Zealand and other locations internationally and these include Arte Fiera (Bologna, 1998) and National Museum of Ghana (Accra, 2010). Along with Ethiopian modern artist Wosene Worke Kosrof, he is one of the few artists to have his work featured annually in the Contemporary African Art calendar published by Avalanche Publishing.
