= Blank Slate Monument =

- Designer: Kwame Akoto-Bamfo
- Type: Sculpture
- Material: Bronze
- Beginning date: June 2021
- Website: blankslatemonument.com

The Blank Slate Monument (officially called Blank Slate: Hope for a New America) is a monument by Ghanaian artist Kwame Akoto-Bamfo. The work has been described as "a visual representation of the evolution of the Black experience and struggle in America, as well as a tribute to African American history".
