= Codjoe =

Codjoe is a surname. Notable people with the surname include:

- Ama Codjoe, American activist, poet and dancer
- Francis Kingsley Ato Codjoe (born 1971), Ghanaian politician
- William Codjoe Omaboe Acquaye-Nortey (born 1930), Ghanaian soldier and politician

== See also ==
- Cudjoe (name)
