= National Theatre of Ghana =

Cultural venue in Accra, Ghana

Coordinates: 05°33′13.25″N -0°12′2.15″W

The National Theatre of Ghana
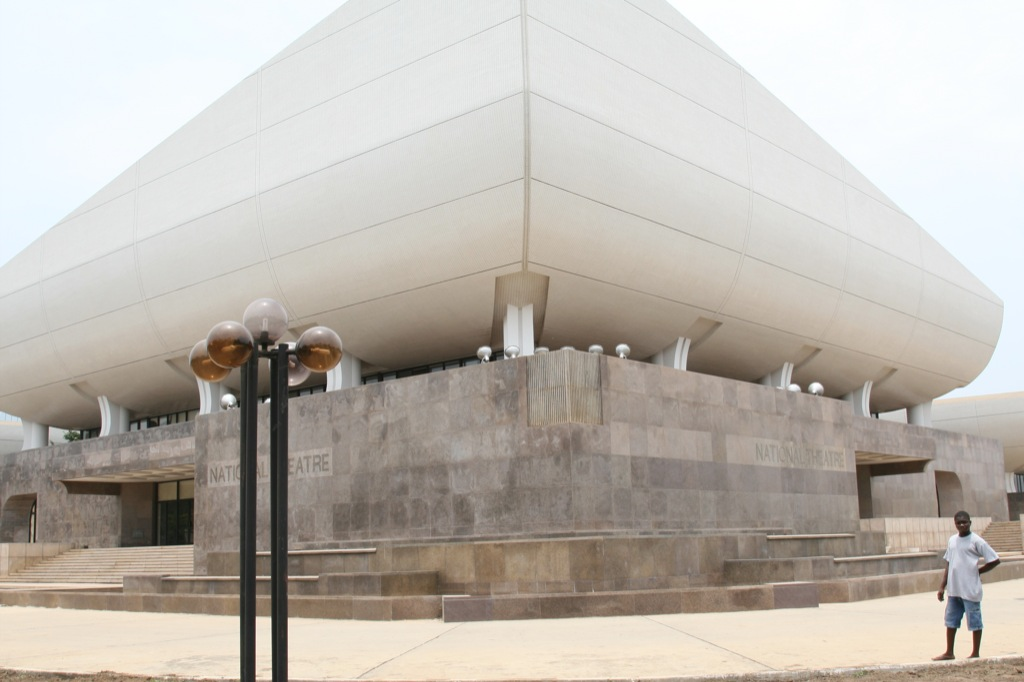
- Interactive map of the The National Theatre of Ghana area

General information
- Status: Completed
- Type: Theatre
- Location: Accra, Ghana
- Construction started: 8 March 1990
- Completed: 16 December 1992
- Opened: 30 December 1992
- Client: Ghana National Commission of Culture

Design and construction
- Architects: Cheng Taining and Ye Xianghan

Website
- www.nationaltheatre.gov.gh

References
- http://www.nationaltheatre.gov.gh/index.php/history/ https://archnet.org/sites/1413/media_contents/15314

The National Theatre of Ghana opened in Accra, the capital of Ghana, in 1992. Its purpose is to spearhead the country's theatre movement by providing a multi-functional venue for concerts, dance, drama, and musical performances, as well as exhibitions and special events. In Ghana, theatre as an artistic form has existed for centuries in the traditional dramatic expressions of society, however, the National Theatre Movement (NTM) was conceived around the time of Ghana's independence in 1957 to help remold the new nation's cultural identity. The theatre is governed by the National Theatre Law 1991, PNDC Law 259. The building houses the three resident companies of the National Dance Company, the National Symphony Orchestra, and the National Drama Company.

== Structure ==
The theatre has a building area of 11,896 square metres (128,050 square feet) and is sited near the junction of the Independence Avenue and Liberia Road. The building has complicated construction molding, and novel exterior features. When viewed from a distance, the whole structure resembles a gigantic ship or a seagull spreading its wings. The theatre, which is located in the Victoriaborg district of Accra, was built by the Chinese and offered as a gift to Ghana.

== National Dance Company ==
The National Dance Company is also known as "The Ghana Dance Ensemble". The company was first established in the Institute of African Studies at the University of Ghana as the first of its kind in 1962. It was then directed by Emeritus Professor J. H. Kwabena Nketia, with Professor Mawere Opoku as the artistic director; it was endorsed by Kwame Nkrumah in 1962. In 1992, a split occurred, in which part of the group left for the National Theatre and was directed by Francis Nii Yartey, while some artists remained at the University of Ghana under the direction of E. A. Duodu. Since then, the National Dance company has had other directors such as David Amoo (2006–2013), Mr Nii-Tete Yartey (2013–2018) and Stephany Ursula Yamoah (2018–present).

== The Drama Company ==
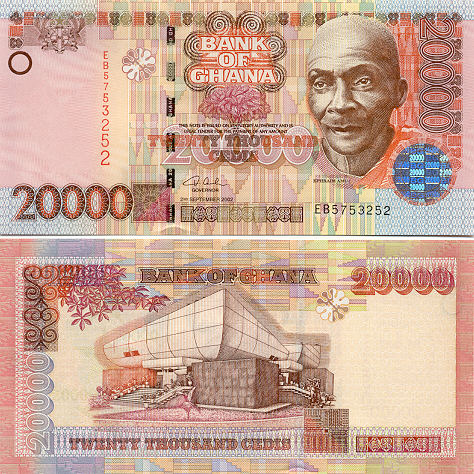
The National Theatre on the reverse of a 20,000 cedis banknote (2002)

The Drama Company is one of the three resident performing groups of the National Theatre of Ghana. It was established in August 1983 as a Model Repertory Troupe to facilitate teaching, research, and experimentation at the University of Ghana, Legon. Then, it became the resident theatre for the theatre upon its completion in 1991.

== Concert Party (Ghana) ==
The concert party, a theatre show which peaked in the early twentieth- century is a crowd-puller at the theatre. The concert party, although has its origins in Britain, was remodeled by Ghanaian artists and became a popular form of theatre in the 1950s and 1960s. Besides being turned into films, television series, photoplay, and cassettes, the concert party has been cherished for its theatre performances, often held at the national theatre. In fact, the medium was used for "theatre-for-development" to discuss topics such as family planning, AIDS and environmental protection, an idea originally pioneered by the Workers Brigades and Efua Sutherland.

== See also ==
- 1992 in architecture
- Accra International Conference Centre
- Accra Sports Stadium
- Architecture of Africa
- Culture of Ghana
- List of national theatres
