= The Art of Healing Descendant Pain =

- Directed by: Darius Matheson
- Written by: Kwame Akoto-Bamfo; Darius Matheson
- Release date: 24 May 2024 (France)

The Art of Healing Descendant Pain is a Ghanaian documentary which was released on 24 May, 2024 in France. The movie was written by Kwame Akoto-Bamfo and Darius Matheson, and was directed by Darius Matheson. The film has both English and Akan dialogue.

== Cast ==
- Vincent letsa kobla diokoto
- Kwame Akoto-Bamfo
- Osei Bonsu
- Natty Ogly
