= Wosene Worke Kosrof =

Ethiopian artist

For over two decades, Ethiopian-born artist Wosene Worke Kosrof has experimented with the aesthetic potential of language, using written Amharic as the major compositional element in his bold colored and textured works.

Wosene Worke Kosrof (born 1955) is an Ethiopian painter and mixed-media artist.

Wosene (his professional name) was awarded his B.F.A. from the School of Fine Arts in Addis Ababa in 1972, and received an M.F.A. from Howard University in 1980. He is best known for his inventive renderings of the Amharic script; and he is the first Ethiopian-born contemporary artist to incorporate these script symbols as a core aesthetic element in fine art paintings. His recognizable "signature" emerges by distorting, elongating, dissecting, and reassembling the symbols as images. Amharic is derived from the ancient language Ge’ez and a major modern language of Ethiopia, is one of the few written systems indigenous to Africa.

Wosene likes to examine the relationship between sound and color in art. He says jazz is especially important in his own creative process. Jazz improvisations underlie his compositions, animating them with rhythmic movements and emboldening his masterful use of color.

Wosene's paintings, in his words, "...create a visible, interacting surface - like an icon available to everyone; it allows them to have dialogue, to take them into memory..."

Wosene explained that he does not pre-sketch paintings, "my process is inchoate and exploratory: the interplay of accident and intention, of mastery and uncertainty, of curiosity and discovery. Quick-drying acrylics allow me to easily build and destroy colors and figures on canvas."

His work incorporates elements of experimentation and improvisation, reflecting the interplay of intention and uncertainty described in his artistic process. This approach allows viewers to engage with the compositions and interpret them individually.

Wosene reflected on the effects of learning to see by viewing art in context of relationship between the risks of adolescence and the risks of art and stated: "Seeing differently, we then begin questioning our habits of mind and feel a new urge to create visions and images of what can be."

Wosene's works are in museum collections, including the Smithsonian National Museum of African Art (DC); The Newark Museum (NJ); Neuberger Museum (NY); Indianapolis Museum of Art (IN); Birmingham Museum of Art (AL); Fowler Museum, UCLA (CA); Samuel P. Harn Museum (FL); the National Museum (Addis Ababa); and in many international private and corporate collections. He exhibits widely in the US, and he works from his studio in Oakland, CA.
