= Sampson Cudjoe =

Ghanaian footballer

Personal information
- Date of birth: June 22, 1988 (age 38)
- Place of birth: Tamale, Ghana
- Height: 1.85 m (6 ft 1 in)
- Position: Defender

Team information
- Current team: Tudu Mighty Jets
- Number: 3

Youth career
- 2001–2003: Tudu Mighty Jets

Senior career*
Years	Team	Apps	(Gls)
2004–2005	Tudu Mighty Jets	-	(-)
2006–2010	Kessben F.C.	0	(0)
2008	→ FC Honka (loan)	2	(0)
2010–2011	Ashanti Gold	-	(-)
2011–2013	Medeama SC	-	(-)
2013–2016	Hearts of Oak		

International career^{‡}
	Ghana	2	(0)
- * Club domestic league appearances and goals as of 30 May 2013 ‡ National team caps and goals as of 30 May 2008

Sampson Cudjoe (born June 22, 1988) is a Ghanaian footballer, who is currently playing for Accra Hearts of Oak SC in the Ghana Premier League.

== Career ==
Cudjoe is rated as one of the biggest talents of Ghana, he began his career by Tudu Mighty Jets, before 2006 transferred to Kessben F.C., the club from Abrankese loaned him in to FC Honka from August 2008 until end of season. The central midfielder signed in summer 2010 for Ashanti Gold SC.

On August 5, 2011, it was announced that Cudjoe had joined Algerian side ES Sétif. However, the move did not materialize and the player was instead linked with a move to Egyptian side Zamalek SC.

On 23 August 2013, he moved to Hearts of Oak from Medeama SC on a three-year deal.

== Position ==
Cudjoe defensive a and defender.

== Personal ==
Sampson is also the cousin of Isaac Vorsah.
