= National Memorial for Peace and Justice =

Memorial in Montgomery, Alabama, commemorating victims of lynching in the US

The National Memorial for Peace and Justice
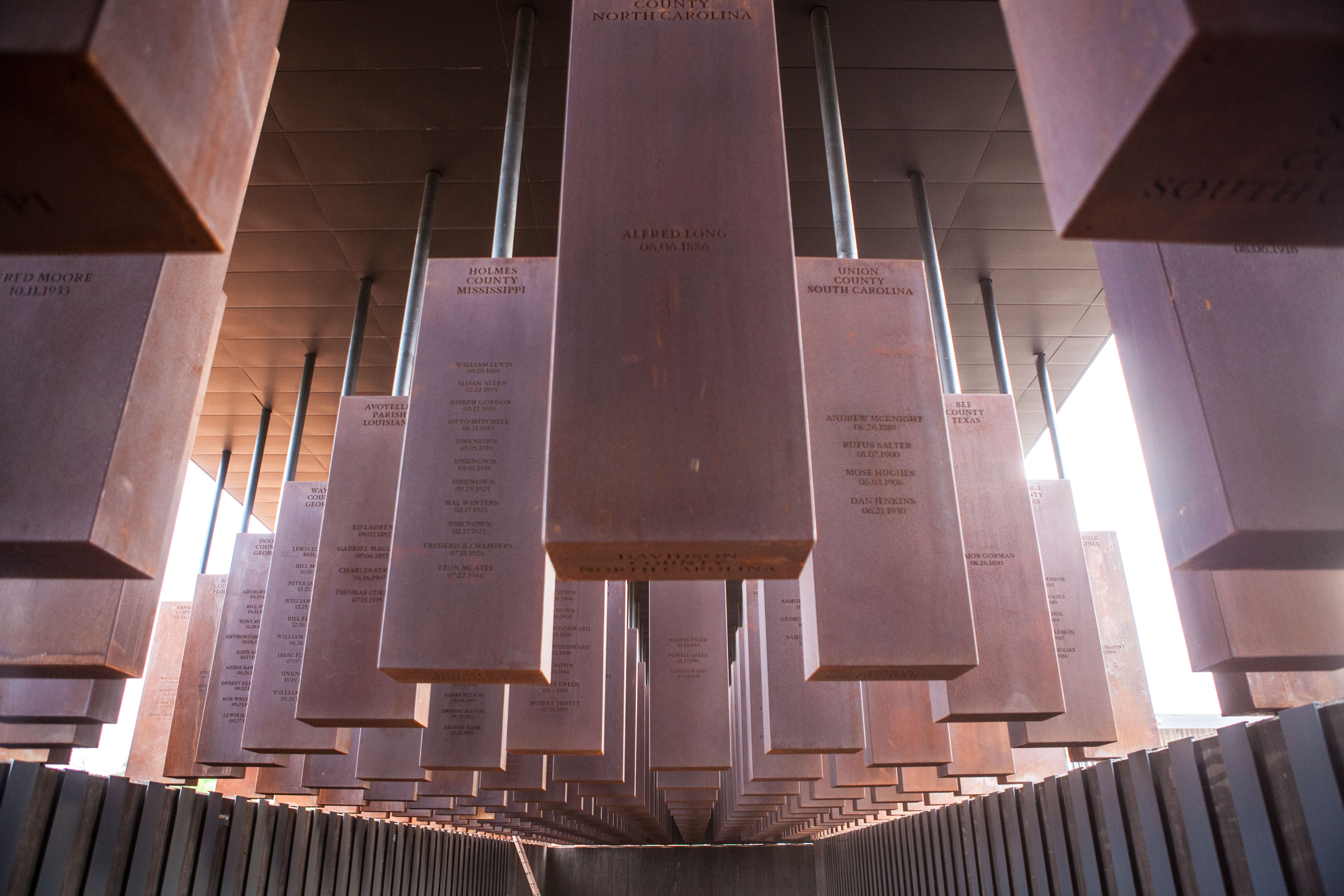
- The memorial includes 805 hanging steel rectangles, representing each of the counties in the United States where a documented lynching took place
- Interactive map of The National Memorial for Peace and Justice
- Location: Montgomery, Alabama
- Coordinates: 32°22′19″N 86°18′46″W
- Opening date: April 26, 2018; 8 years ago
- Website: Official website
- Owner: Equal Justice Initiative

The National Memorial for Peace and Justice, informally known as the National Lynching Memorial, is a memorial to commemorate the black victims of lynching in the United States. It is intended to focus on and acknowledge past racial terrorism and advocate for social justice in America. Founded by the non-profit Equal Justice Initiative, it opened in downtown Montgomery, Alabama, on April 26, 2018.

It consists of a memorial square with 805 hanging steel rectangles representing each of the U.S. counties where a documented lynching took place. It includes sculptures depicting themes related to racial violence.

The monument was positively received by architectural critics, activists, and the general public. Philip Kennicott of The Washington Post described it as "one of the most powerful and effective new memorials created in a generation".

== Background ==
The National Memorial for Peace and Justice was created by the Equal Justice Initiative (EJI) on a six-acre site in the downtown area of Montgomery, Alabama. The memorial opened to the public April 26, 2018. The memorial is connected to The Legacy Museum, which opened the same day, near the site of a former market in Montgomery where enslaved people were sold. EJI hopes that the memorial "inspires communities across the nation to enter an era of truth-telling about racial injustice and their own local histories."

The memorial not only focuses on the legacy of racial terror lynchings, racial segregation and Jim Crow, but also present issues of guilt and police violence. The six-acre site includes sculptures and displays from Kwame Akoto-Bamfo, Dana King, and Hank Willis Thomas. There are writings and words from Toni Morrison, Elizabeth Alexander, and Dr. Martin Luther King Jr.. A reflection space is located on the memorial site in honor Ida B. Wells.

The largest part of the memorial is the memorial square. The memorial square was created using EJI's study, Lynching in America: Confronting the Legacy of Racial Terror. The memorial consists of 805 suspended steel beams. Each beam represents a county within a state where a racial terror lynching occurred and was documented. Each of the six-foot beams is engraved with the names and locations of the victims of racial terrorism, including lynching. Victims of racial terrorism whose names are unknown are remembered on the beams as well. The memorial includes replicas of the steel beams that are set off to the side. These replica beams are a part of EJI's Community Remembrance Project.

The development and construction of the memorial complex cost an estimated $20 million, raised from private foundations. Bryan Stevenson, founder of the EJI, was inspired by the examples of the Memorial to the Murdered Jews of Europe in Berlin, Germany, and the Apartheid Museum in Johannesburg, South Africa, to create a single memorial to victims of white supremacy in the United States.

EJI's Lynching in America: Confronting the Legacy of Racial Terror was a multi-year investigation into racial lynchings. By studying records in counties across the United States, researchers documented almost 4400 racial terror lynchings in the post-Reconstruction era between 1877 and 1950. Most took place in the decades just before and after the turn of the 20th century. A conversation about the difficulty of doing research on lynchings and racial terror violence was started when an error was found at the memorial not long after its opening. The error, a mistake in naming a victim from Duluth, Minnesota, was quickly corrected by EJI.

== Description ==
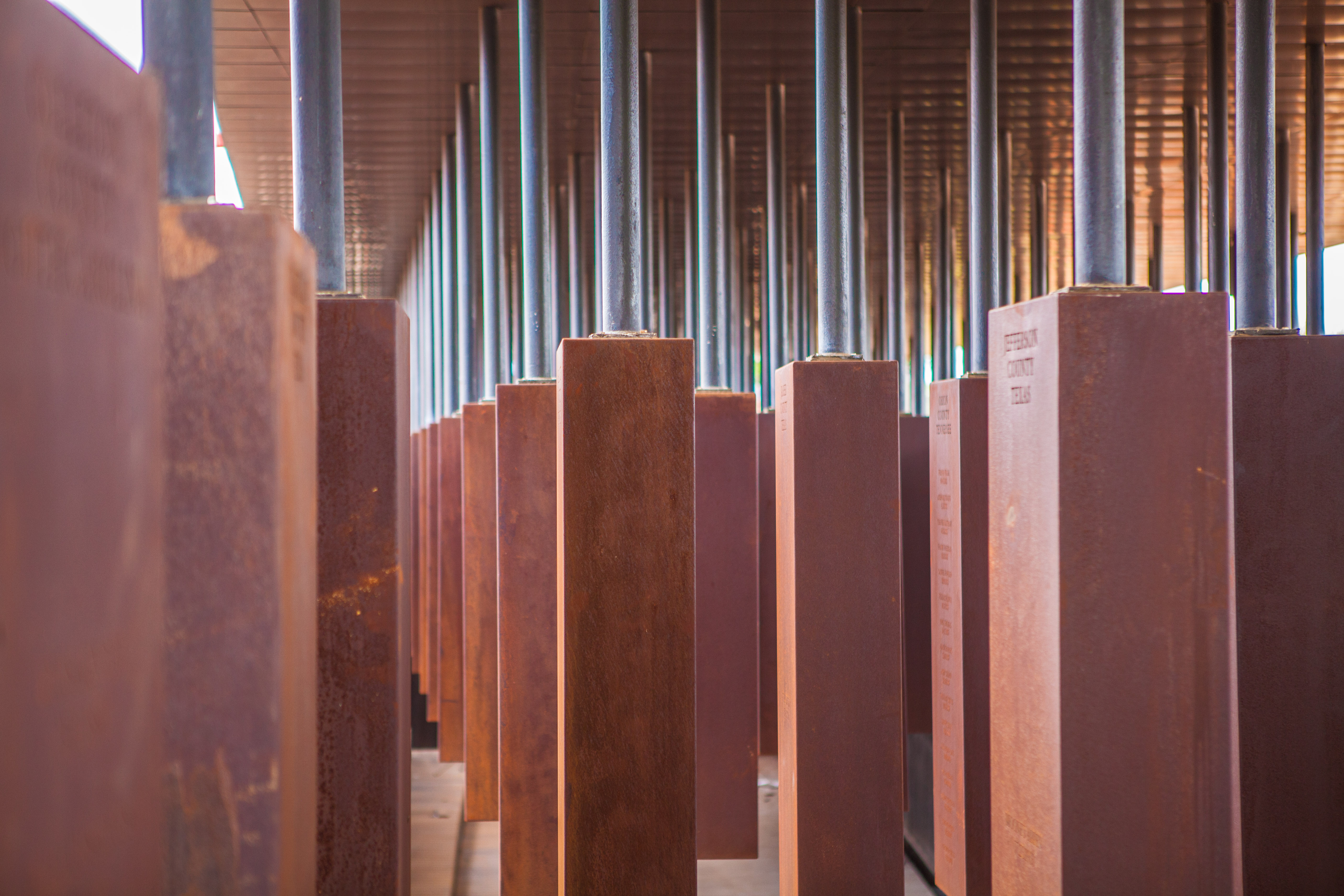
Memorial monuments

In the central position is the memorial square with 805 hanging steel rectangles, the size and shape of coffins. These name and represent each of the counties and their states where a documented lynching took place, as compiled in the EJI study, Lynching in America: Confronting the Legacy of Racial Terror (2017, 3rd edition). Each of the steel plates has the names of the documented lynching victims (or "unknown" if the name is not known). The names and dates of documented victims are engraved on the panels. Visitors to the site have commented on how, from afar, the beams look like a forest of hanging bodies, and the replica beams off to the side look like rows of coffins. More than 4075 documented lynchings of black people took place between 1877 and 1950, concentrated in 12 Southern states. In addition, the EJI has published supplementary information about lynchings in several states outside the South. The monument is the first major work in the nation to name and honor these victims.

The central memorial was designed by MASS Design Group with Lam Partners lighting design, and built on land purchased by EJI. Hank Willis Thomas's sculpture, Rise Up, features a wall, from which emerge statues of black heads and bodies raising their arms in surrender to the viewer. The piece suggests visibility, which is one of the intentions of the monument. The viewer is asked to focus and see the subject of the artwork. This is a more current piece commenting on the police violence and police brutality prevalent in the years preceding the memorial. Thomas has said about his artwork, "I see the work that I make as asking questions."

In the landscaped area outside the monument are benches where visitors can sit to reflect. These commemorate such activists as journalist Ida B. Wells, who in the 1890s risked her life to report that lynchings were more about economic competition of blacks and whites, than actual assaults by blacks of whites. Laid in rows on the ground are steel columns corresponding to those hanging in the Memorial. These columns are intended to be temporary. The Equal Justice Initiative is asking representatives of each of the counties to claim their monument and establish a memorial on home ground to lynching victims, and to conduct related public education. The placing of these monuments is that last step of EJI's Community Remembrance Project, and a memorial beam is placed when a community has engaged with and discussed issues of racial violence both in the past and present in their communities. EJI hopes that the monument in the community will "stand as a symbolic reminder of the community’s continuing efforts to truthfully grapple with painful racial history, challenge injustice where it exists in their own lives, and vow never to repeat the terror and violence of the past."

A month after the monument's opening, the Montgomery Advertiser reported that citizens in Montgomery County were considering asking for their column. Both county and the city of Montgomery officials were discussing this.

== Central monuments ==
=== Nkyinkyim by Kwame Akoto-Bamfo ===
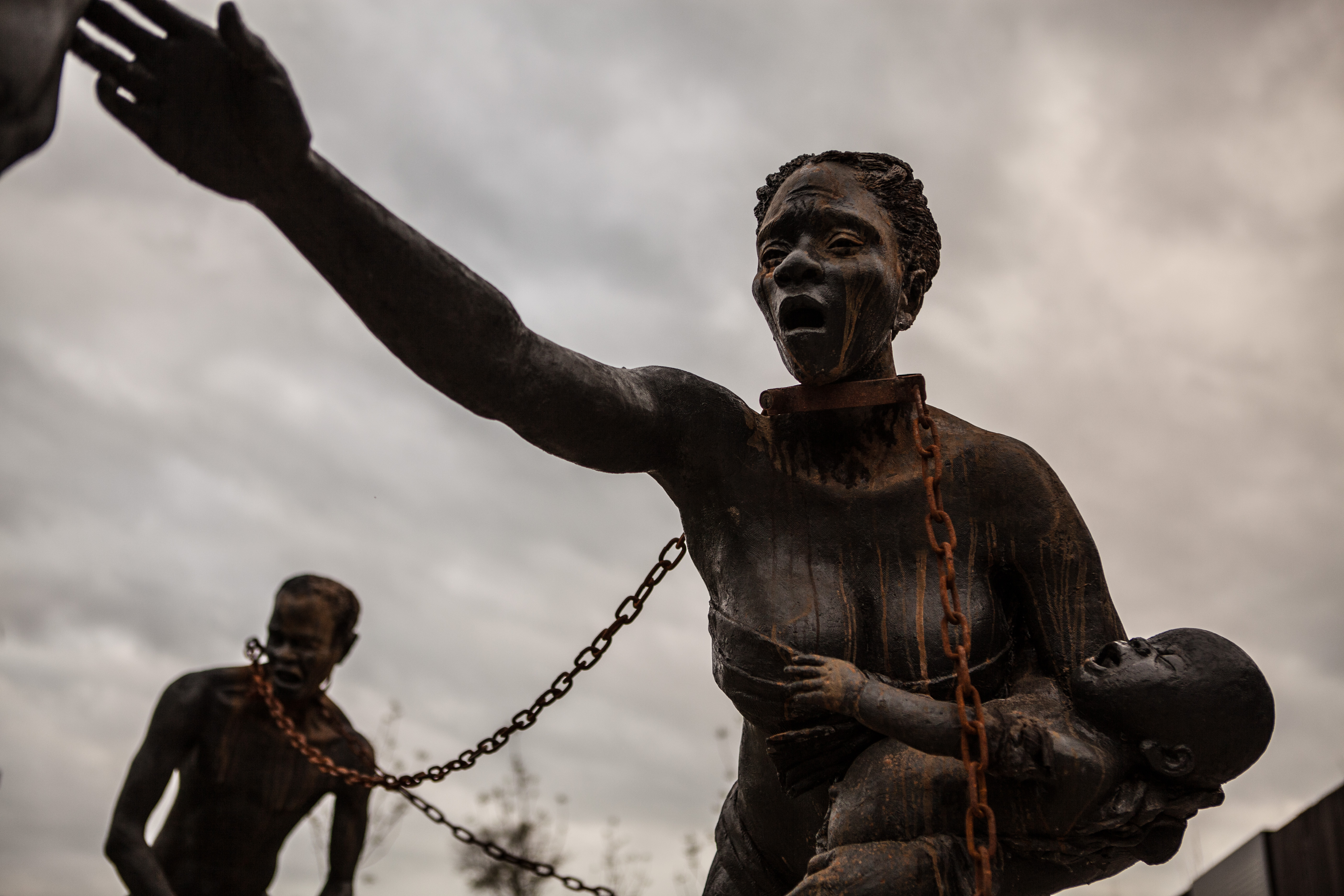
Installation by Kwame Akoto-Bamfo

The Memorial is organized in three different sections. The first section is the lead up to the monument which begins to tell the tale of the beginning of the lives of African Americans through the demonstration of the racial terror evoked in the Middle Passage. Visitors first encounter a sculpture by Ghanaian artist Kwame Akoto-Bamfo entitled Nkyinkyim, meaning "twisted", a term referring to a Ghanaian proverb, "life is a twisted journey". The sculpture, seven shackled figures of all ages and genders interlocked together, is part of larger project Akoto-Bamfo began in Accra, Ghana where he creates clay busts of formerly enslaved people in an attempt to preserve their memories and livelihood, a common tradition practiced by the Akan people in Ghana.

In the Middle Passage, people were stripped of their African identity through the loss of names, ethnic identity, families, and more. The Nkyinkyim sculptures include description and details of each shackled person portrayed; Akoto-Bamfo's sculptures aim to return these identities symbolically, giving them backgrounds ranging from “Daughter of a Royal” to “Uncle’s Brother” to “The Lost Guardian”.

=== Guided by Justice by Dana King ===
American artist Dana King's Guided by Justice is a rendering of the Montgomery Bus Boycott during the Civil Rights Movement. It depicts three women: a grandmother, a teacher, and a pregnant woman. There are footprints on the ground near the three people, representing a call to action for others to join them in the cause. King's sculpture aims to have viewers reconsider the mythology of the heroines of the bus boycott: mythologizing historical figures like Rosa Parks draws attention away from the thousands of other black people who were central in the success of the bus boycott; the three anonymous figures and the adjacent footprints demonstrate the importance of these "silent activists".

=== Raise Up by Hank Willis Thomas ===
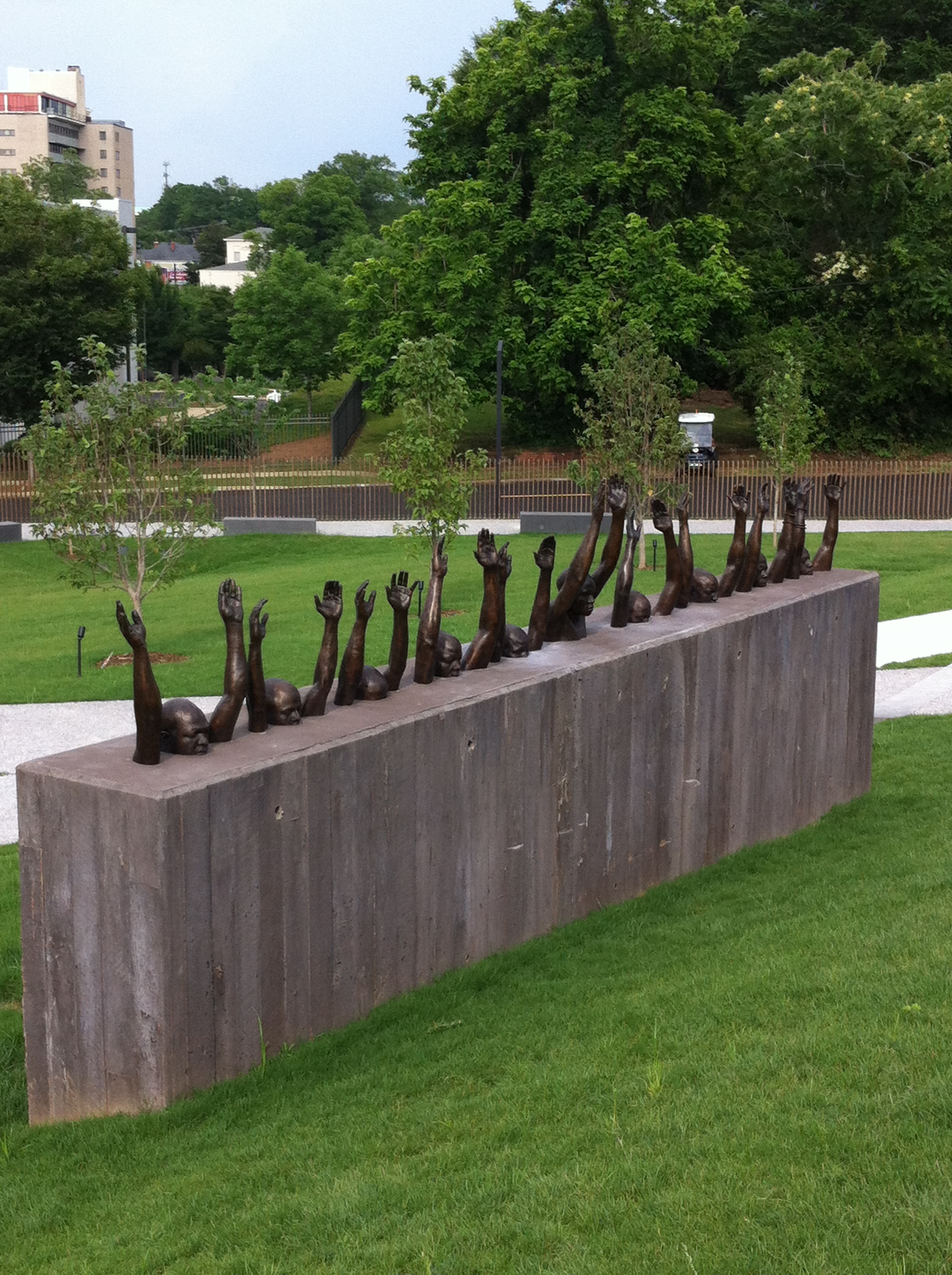
The Raise Up installation

The journey through the memorial continues with Hank Willis Thomas's sculpture Raise Up, a depiction of policing in America. The sculpture depicts ten Black men, encased in concrete, some with their heads sunken into the concrete with their hands up and their eyes closed. Cultural studies scholar Tanja Schult saw Thomas' sculpture as a powerful evocation of the reality of black men in America when coming face to face with law enforcement. Thomas interestingly encases these Black men in concrete, leaving them unable to move. Some figures' heads are sunken in as well, further demonstrating the lack of control and autonomy black people have over their bodies. Though most of their bodies covered, their hands are clearly visible, referencing the many stories of unarmed Black men being shot and brutalized by the police despite their innocence. The National Memorial uses Thomas’ sculpture as a connection to the present, a kind of call to action that the fight for justice and liberation is ongoing.

== Importance for Montgomery ==
Prior to the 1990s, there was limited acknowledgement in Montgomery of the enduring legacy of slavery and racism, although the city had numerous monuments related to the Confederacy, many erected by private organizations. The city has developed a Civil Rights trail marking such events as the 1965 Selma to Montgomery marches, and identified buildings and sites associated with slavery, such as the former market site. With the opening of the monument, the city was ranked by The New York Times as its Top 2018 Destination. Lee Sentell of the Alabama Department of Tourism acknowledged that the National Memorial offers a different and painful encounter: "Most museums are somewhat objective and benign...This one is not. This is aggressive, political. ... It's a part of American history that has never been addressed as much in your face as this story is being told". Mayor Todd Strange suggested that the memorial offered "our nation's best chance at reconciliation".

The opening celebrations, in May 2018, attracted thousands of people to Montgomery. Artists who performed included Stevie Wonder, Patti LaBelle, and Usher; speakers included U.S. Congressman and civil rights movement activist John Lewis from Georgia. The publishers of the Montgomery Advertiser, a major Alabama newspaper founded in 1829, prompted by the establishment of the memorial, reviewed and formally apologized for its historic coverage of lynchings, which was often inflammatory against black victims, describing it as "our shame" and saying "we were wrong".

The memorial and its attendant museum are expected to generate heightened tourism for Montgomery, even if it is dark tourism. The Atlanta Journal-Constitution noted that, with the addition of the memorial and the museum, Montgomery and Atlanta together provide a narrative of African-American history, as the latter has sites associated with national Civil Rights leader Rev. Martin Luther King Jr. and local history as well. Tourism officials said that possibly 100,000 extra visitors per year may arrive.

== The Legacy Museum ==
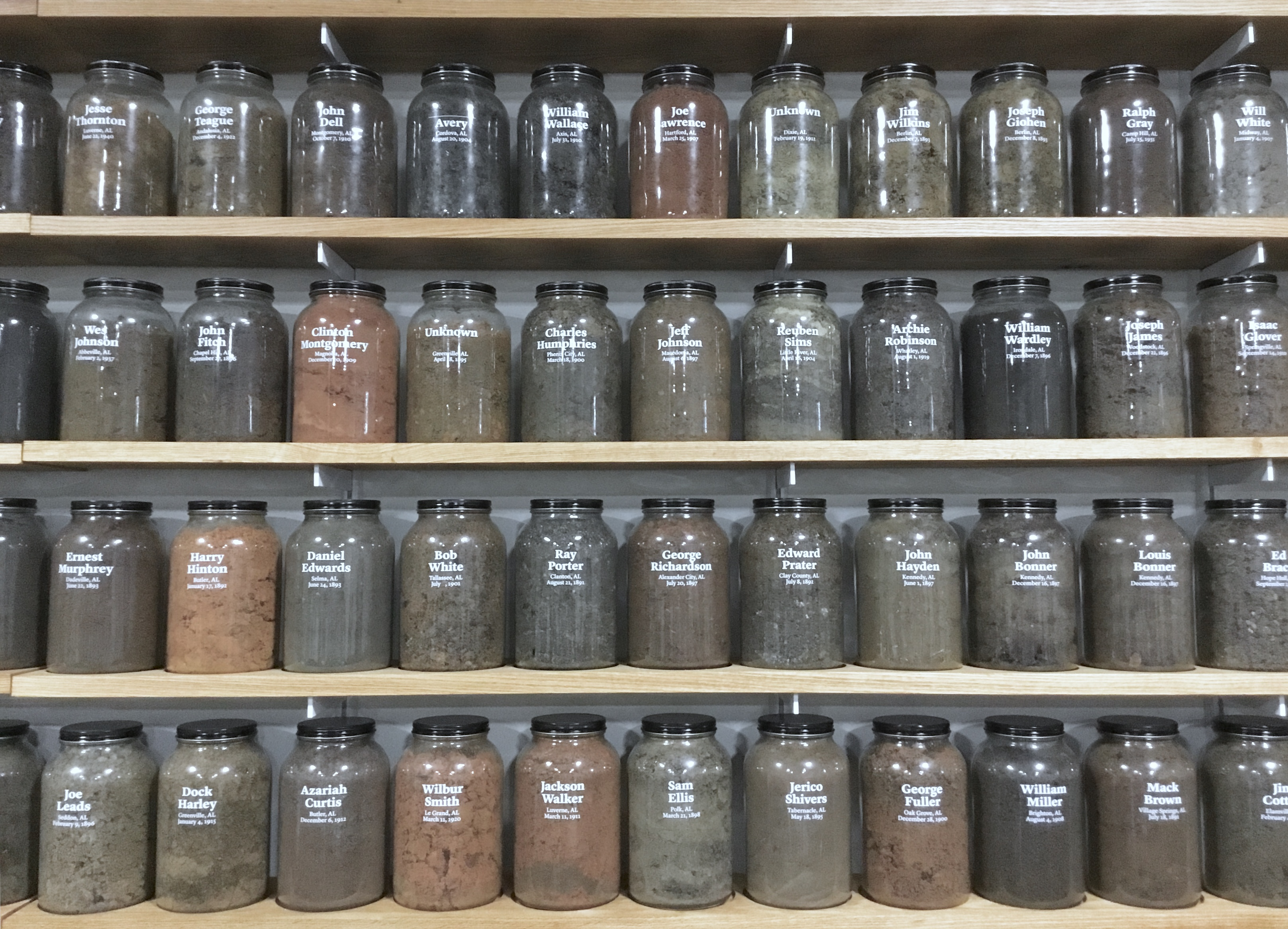
A collection of soil from lynching sites across the United States on display at The Legacy Museum.

Opened on the same date as the outdoor memorial, The Legacy Museum: From Enslavement to Mass Incarceration is a museum that displays and interprets the history of slavery and racism in America, with a focus on mass incarceration and racial inequality in the justice system.

The museum features artwork by Hank Willis Thomas, Glenn Ligon, Jacob Lawrence, Elizabeth Catlett, Titus Kaphar, and Sanford Biggers. One of its displays is a collection of soil from lynching sites across the United States, a step in EJI's Community Remembrance Project. This exhibit expresses the vast effects of slavery, lynchings, and black oppression across state lines. The exhibits in the 11,000-square-foot museum include oral history, archival materials, and interactive technology.

== Gallery ==
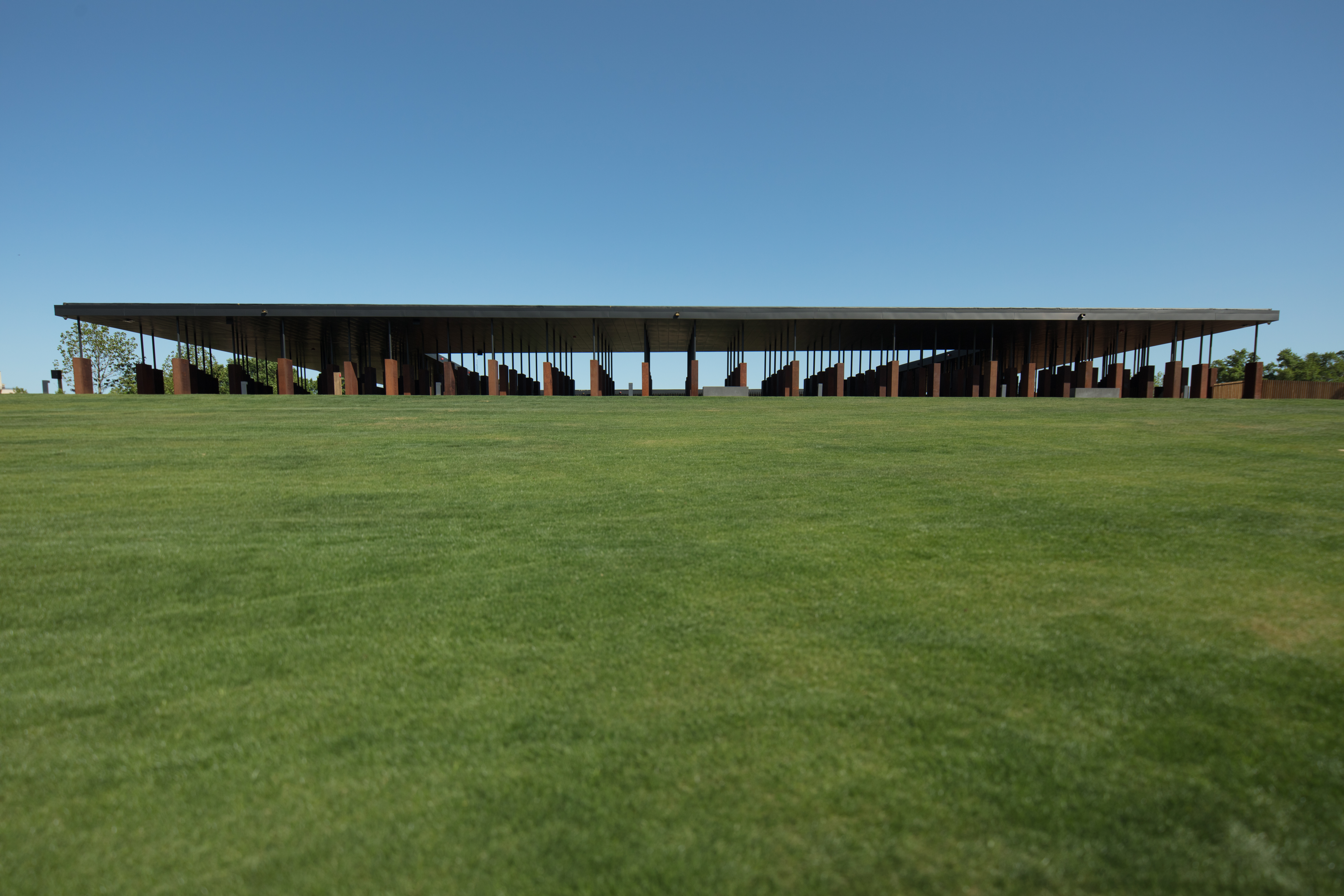
Outside view of the memorial

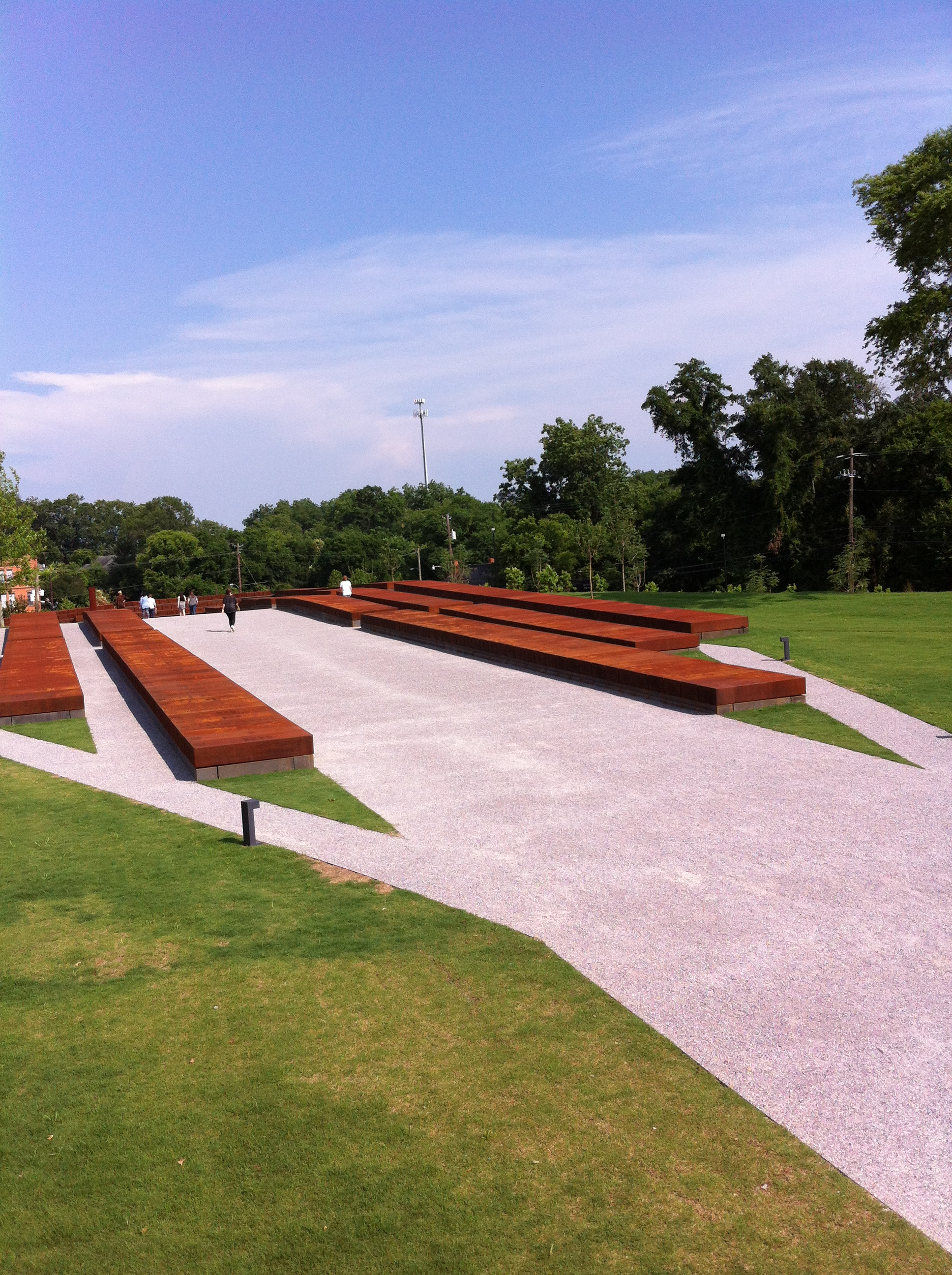
Steel columns intended for each county

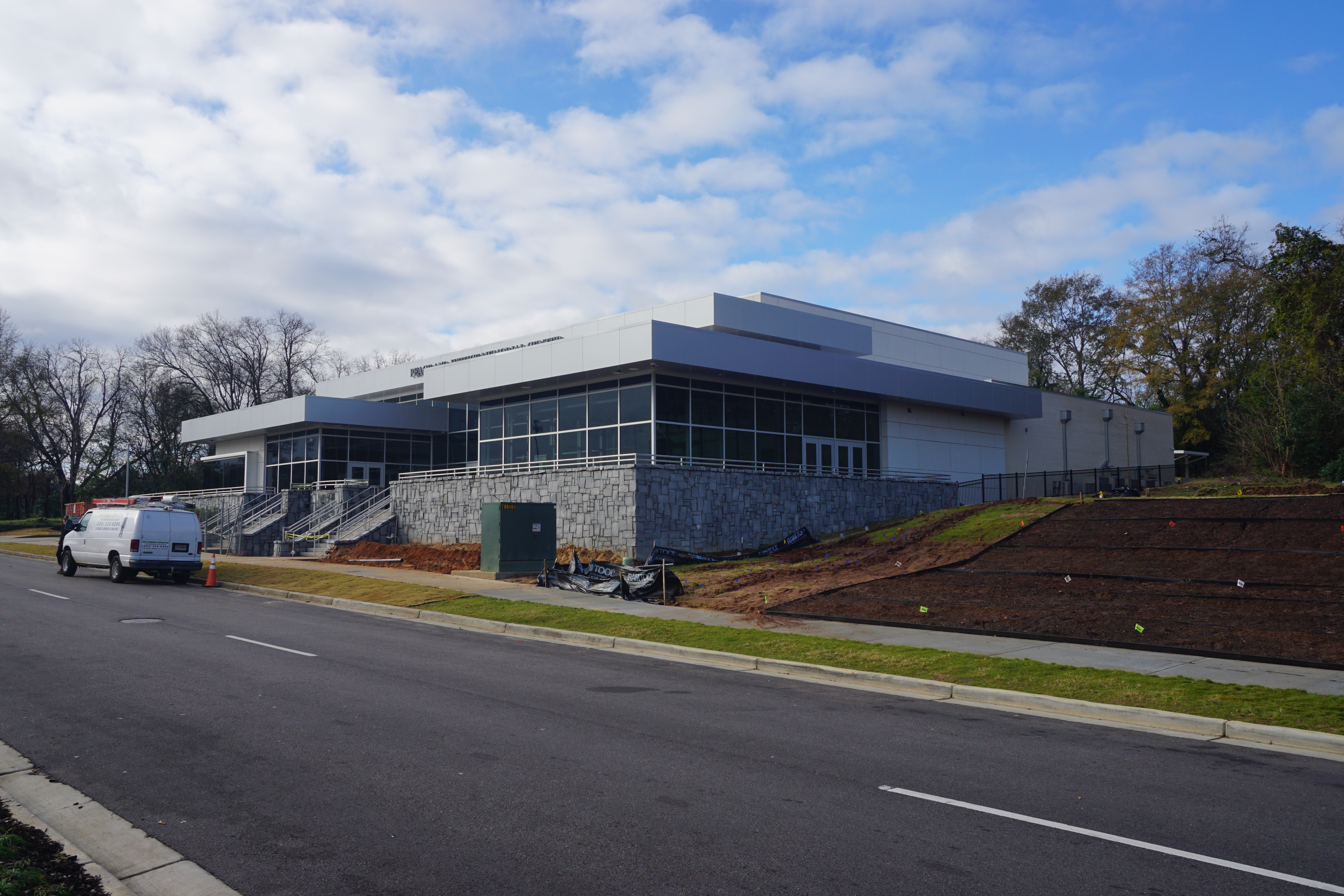
National Memorial for Peace and Justice Center

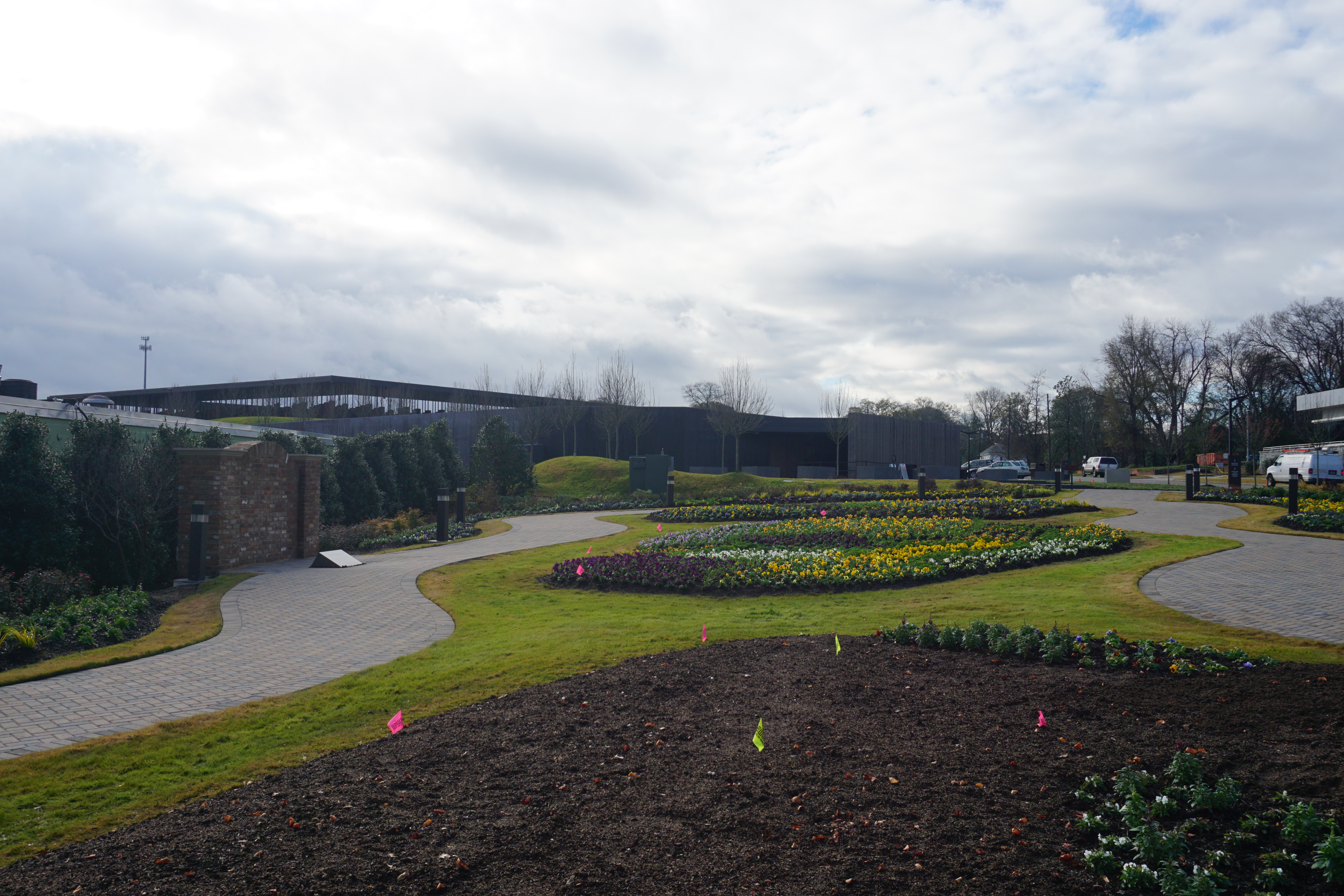
National Memorial for Peace and Justice Garden

== See also ==
- List of lynching victims in the United States
- List of museums focused on African Americans
- National Museum of African American History and Culture
- Topography of Terror, a museum in Berlin dedicated to the victims of the Nazi regime
