= Kobin =

Kobin (Russian: Кобин, Ukrainian: Кобін), female form Kobina, is an East Slavic surname. Notable people with this surname include:

- Chris Kobin, screenwriter and film producer living in Los Angeles, California
- Nataliya Kobina (born 1979), Uzbekistani sprinter
- Vasyl Kobin (born 1985), retired Ukrainian football midfielder and manager of Mynai
