= Kobina Daniel Gwira =

Ghanaian diplomat and lawyer

High Commissioner of Ghana to Sierra Leone

Personal details
- Born: Sekondi, Western Region
- Education: Adisadel College
- Alma mater: King's Inn; Trinity College Dublin
- Occupation: Lawyer
- Profession: Diplomat

Kobina Daniel Gwira was a Ghanaian diplomat and activist lawyer.

== Early life and education ==
Born in Sekondi in Ghana's Western Region on 2 January 1923, he received his basic education at St Pauls E. C. M School for his basic education and later went to Adisadel College. He had a diploma in public administration from 1953 to 1954 at Trinity College Dublin. He also attended the King's Inn.

Born in Sekondi in Ghana's Western Region on 2 January 1923, he received his basic education at St. Paul's E. C. M. School and later attended Adisadel College

== Career ==
Gwira was a lawyer by profession. In 1953, he was called to the Irish Bar.

== Ambassadorial role ==
Gwira served as the High Commissioner of Ghana to Sierra Leone.
