= Isaac Chukwu Udeh =

Ghanaian performance artist (b. 1997)

- Born: 20 September 1997 (age 28); Ghana
- Education: Wesley Grammer Schhol, Accra
- Occupations: painter, live painter, performing artist

Isaac Chukwu Udeh (born 20 September 1997), popularly known as Chukwu the painter, is a Ghanaian painter, live painter, and performance artist. He is known for his reverse painting, and has exhibited at Ghana Banking Awards in 2016 and 2017. His artwork exhibitions was unveiled at the MTN Heroes of Change 2019. He is known for his tribute painting for the late UN Secretary General Kofi Annan, Kobe Bryant and Gianna Bryant.

== Education ==
He studied secondary education at Wesley Grammar School in Accra and his basic Education at the Alpha Beta Educational Center. For his tertiary education, he graduated from Takoradi Technical University where he studied Commercial painting.

== Awards and nominations ==
He was recognized at the EMY Awards Africa, Ghana Edition. He was nominated as Influential Artist at GUBA Awards 2019. He received a citation and a cash prize from MTN Heroes of Change 2019 after unveiling the winner for the event.
