= Rikki Wemega-Kwawu =

Ghanaian artist

- Born: February 3, 1959 (age 67); Sekondi, Ghana
- Education: Largely self-taught Skowhegan School of Painting and Sculpture, Maine
- Known for: Large-scale paintings incorporating ancient African symbols Eclectic style blending pictorial and abstract themes Work addressing globalization, African diaspora, and cultural politics
- Notable work: Ashanti Saga (included in "Artists Speak" exhibition, San Diego Museum of Man, 2007–2008)
- Style: Painting; Conceptual art
- Movement: Contemporary African art

Rikki Wemega-Kwawu is a contemporary Ghanaian artist, born on February 3, 1959, in the city of Sekondi, Ghana.

Wemega-Kwawu's work is characterized by a synthesis of the past and the present. He incorporates a plethora of ancient African symbols into his large-scale paintings. He states: "Drawing upon a vein of ancient African religious iconography, I aim in my work at a symbolic expression of a spiritual process and spiritual knowledge to recapture the lost power of traditional African art."

== Education ==
He is largely self-taught, he is an alumnus of Skowhegan School of Painting and Sculpture in Skowhegan, Maine.

== Career ==
He is a painter since 1981, He has participated in many group exhibitions and his work can be found across the world in private and public collections, including the Dutch Artotheek.

His is a very eclectic painter, swinging easily between pictorial and abstract themes, without any qualms." A statement written by the artist can be found at the website of African Encounters, his representatives on the west coast.

His painting Ashanti Saga was included in the exhibition "Artists Speak" at the San Diego Museum of Man, on display from May 2007 through February 28, 2008.

His conceptual art work promotes the use of diverse media in visual art. His projects include those that address the effects of globalization and the African diaspora on African art.

Wemega-Kwawu also writes about the politics of cultural dictatorship in the evaluation of modern African art.
