= Wiz Kudowor =

Ghanaian artist

Wisdom 'Wiz' Kudowor (born September 19, 1957) is a contemporary artist from Ghana.

Kudowor studied at the College of Art, University of Science and Technology, Ghana. He graduated in 1981 with a first class honours degree in fine art.

He has designed and executed public works in Ghana including a relief mural at the Kwame Nkrumah Memorial Park. His works are held in both and public collections, including the Artists Alliance Gallery in Labadi, Accra.

== Awards ==
- Bronze prize at the 2001 Osaka Triennial.

== Solo exhibitions ==
- Wiz Portfolio: Places at the Artists Alliance Gallery, Accra in 2014, consisting of 84 works.
