= Samuel Prophask Asamoah =

Ghanaian painter (b. 1981)

Samuel Prophask Asamoah (born 14 February 1981) is a Ghanaian painter. Brush name "Prophask" (derived from his middle name), his works have been exhibited widely, locally and internationally with several in art collections. Asamoah reportedly sits comfortably in the field of painting with his inspirations for his themes from proverbs, daily activities and dreams. His motivation is finding joy while painting and experiencing pain when not painting.

== Biography ==
Samuel Prophask Asamoah was born on 14 February 1981 at Apenimadi near Hwidiem in the Brong-Ahafo Region of Ghana. Asamoah is from the Bretuo family and belongs to the Bosompra clan. His father, Akwasi Appiah, though a farmer, was an experienced craftsman. Asamoah started his primary education at the Asuoyeboa M/A Primary and Junior High School where his talent was identified through his pencil and colour works. In 1999, he started his senior high school education at the Kumasi Secondary Technical School where he studied Visual Arts. He started sending his works to the Kwame Nkrumah University of Science and Technology (KNUST) gallery and started partaking in the institution's exhibitions. In the tenth anniversary celebration in the school, Asamoah was awarded the best student in General Knowledge in Art due to his demonstration of versatility in creating artworks with a diverse medium. In 2003, he went to the Kwame Nkrumah University of Science and Technology to study Integrated Rural Art and Industry. At KNUST, he participated in the Tratech exhibitions in 2004 and 2005 as well as in the peace pledge exhibition in 2006.

His works are collected in the Ministry of Culture, Tourism and Creative Art, Regimanuel Hotel Gray Estate Limited, Ghana, Stanbic Bank, Ghana, Vodafone Ghana, Nestle Ghana Limited and many other private and public collections. He is now a full-time painter and the chief executive officer of Prophask Ghana Limited.

== Style ==
Asamoah works in diverse styles: abstract, semi-abstract, realistic, and surrealistic paintings. In addition, he employs cubist, expressionist, impressionist, and fauvist styles in unique combinations to speak his language of art, which he describes as synonymous to music. His preferred substrate for painting is canvas with his popular medium being acrylic paint. He utilizes colour to the fullest in his paintings. He interplays warm and cool colours to enliven his ideas in painting. The theme for his paintings focuses on Ghanaian rural and contemporary life, Ghanaian culture, philosophical epistemologies in African proverbs, religious themes, dreams, politics, gender issues, as well as women empowerment and development. His favorite figure is said to be the feminine shape, which he claims depicts the gracefulness and perfection in nature.

== Selected exhibitions ==
- New Directions, Ankara, Turkey, 2015
- New Trend, Berlin, Germany, 2015
- Legacy, Lisbon, Portugal, 2015
- Art for Every Home, Malabo, Equatorial Guinea, 2015
- Prerequisite, Centre for National Culture, Accra, Ghana, 2015
- Redefinition, Freetown, Sierra Leone, 2013
- Speaking Colour, Dubai, 2013
- Colours that speak, South Africa, 2013
- Ghana to Korea, Moree Gallery, Yeosu, South Korea, 2012
- Life, Lagos, Nigeria, 2012
- True Colour, Lome, Togo, 2012
- Life, Cotonou, Benin, 2012
- Independence, Alliance Francoise, Kumasi, Ghana 2007
- Gold Coast Artist, View from the Top, United Kingdom, 2006
