= Fatric Bewong =

Ghanaian artist and teacher

- Citizenship: Ghana
- Education: Kwame Nkrumah University of Science and Technology and University of Hartford
- Occupations: Artist and Teacher
- Known for: Interdisciplinary art, performance, installation

Fatric Bewong is an artist and educator who lives and works in Accra. Her interdisciplinary practice traverses the studio, the classroom, and the field. Bewong sculpts with reused materials and sound improvisation with the intention to revalue them as formal objects which are colorful and plentiful yet sublime in potentials on large scales and varied scopes. Through photographs and video of herself dressed under the guise of Mother Earth (it is symbolic of the environment from which life thrives), she re-contextualises traditional Ghanaian proverbs to open up dialogues and discussions on class systems, labor, love, healing, self-care and self-actualization.

== Early life and education ==
She studied earned a Bachelor of Fine Arts (BFA) at Kwame Nkrumah University of Science and Technology and holds a Master of Fine Arts degree from the University of Hartford, Connecticut in 2019. in her work, she explores the relationship between colonization, consumerism, waste, pollution, and more.

== Career ==
Bewong's artistic practice crosses multiple mediums including sculpture, painting, performance, video and photography. She often uses reclaimed and reused materials as formal objects in her work and incorporates performative elements, sometimes dressing as symbolic figures such as Mother Earth. Her work explores relationships between environmental materials, cultural narratives, labour, and social identity.

== Exhibitions and Projects ==
Bewong has exhibited her work in Ghana, the United States and Europe. She participated in the exhibition If we’re happy in our dreams, does that count? at the ifa‑Gallery in Stuttgart, Germany, as part of the OtherNetwork digital platform and exhibition series.

In March 2016, she presented a solo exhibition titled Caught in the Web at the Nubuke Foundation in Accra, featuring installations, painting and performance works that examined consumer behaviour and waste.

In 2025, her solo exhibition Revolutions Round about the Sun and Round around the Sons opened at venues including the Foundation for Contemporary Art (FCA‑Ghana) in Accra, Dei Centre Ghana in Tesano, and FCA‑Ghana Studio 1 in Jamestown.

She has also participated in the Woori Festival in Wa, Ghana.

== Style and Themes ==
Bewong's work engages with environmental, cultural and social themes, often using discarded or reclaimed materials to highlight human interactions with waste, ecology, and consumerism. Her practice includes elements of performance, installation, and visual storytelling.

== Teaching and Education Work ==
In addition to her work as an artist, Bewong is an educator and has worked as a senior teacher and learning coordinator at the secondary level.
