= Osei Bonsu (artist) =

20th-century Ashanti sculptor (1900–1977)

- Born: 22 October 1900; Kumasi, Ashanti Region, Ghana
- Died: 1 March 1977 (aged 76); Kumasi, Ashanti Region, Ghana
- Known for: Sculpture
- Movement: Ashanti carving

Osei Bonsu (22 October 1900 – 1 March 1977) was a Ghanaian sculptor and practitioner of Ashanti carving.

== Life and career ==
Bonsu was born on 22 October 1900. He was taught carving as an apprentice under his father. He got his start via commissions from Akan chiefs. He carved prolifically from his early twenties to his death in 1977. He was the chief carver of three Asantehene (absolute monarchs of the Kingdom of Ashanti): Prempeh I, Osei Tutu Agyeman Prempeh II, and Opoku Ware II. In this role, he gained many commissions, including work for the Ghana National Museum.

In 1975 and 1976, Bonsu toured the United States as part of the Smithsonian Institution's Festival of American Folklore.

== Works and style ==
After Prempeh I's return from exile, Bonsu was commissioned to carve various regalia including linguist staffs, sword hilts, flywhisk sandals, and ornaments for sandals. Importantly, he was also asked to help in reconstructing the Golden Stool, the famous symbol of power for Ashanti monarchs.

His work is on display in the British Museum, the Ghana National Museum, and the Fowler Museum at UCLA.
