= Kwame Akoto-Bamfo =

Ghanaian sculptor (born 1983)

- Born: 1983 (age 42–43); Ghana
- Education: Kwame Nkrumah University of Science and Technology
- Known for: Nkyinkyim Installation
- Notable work: Blank Slate Monument
- Movement: Sculptor

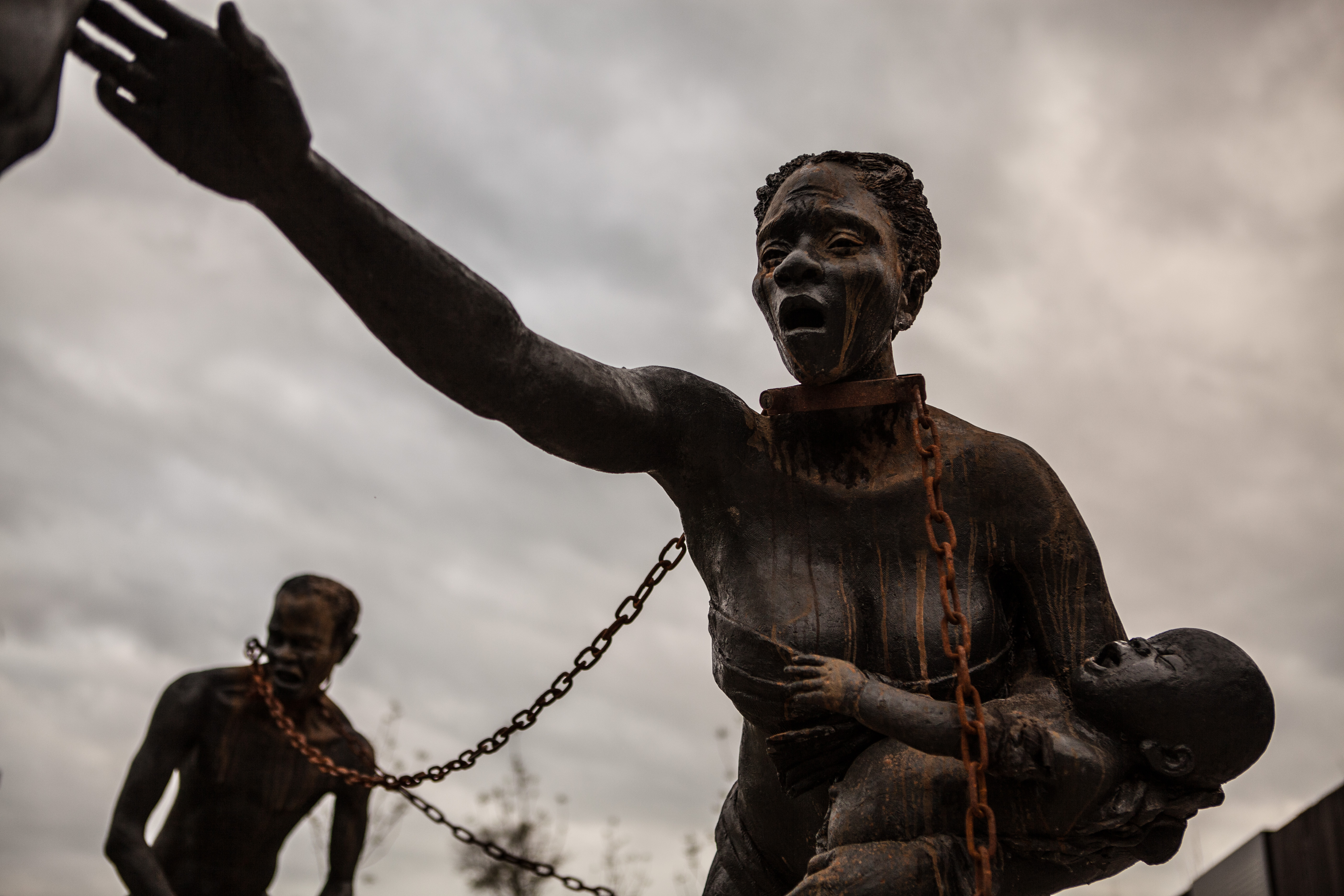
Nkyinkyim by Kwame Akoto-Bamfo at the National Memorial for Peace and Justice that opened in 2018 in Montgomery, Alabama

Kwame Akoto-Bamfo (born 1983) is a multi-disciplinary artist, educator and activist, known for his sculptures and massive body of works dedicated to the memory, healing and Restorative Justice for people of African descent. His outdoor sculptures are dedicated to the memory of the victims of the Transatlantic slave trade, notably the installation Nkyinkim, on display at the National Memorial for Peace and Justice that opened in 2018 in Montgomery, Alabama. His other sculptures include an installation of 1,200 concrete heads representing Ghana's enslaved ancestors in Accra, the capital of Ghana. Called Faux-Reedom, it was unveiled in 2017.

== Early life and education ==
Kwame Akoto-Bamfo grew up in Accra and the Eastern Region of Ghana, where he and his sister were raised by a single mother and grandmother. Learning a lot of traditional Ghanaian culture and values as well as African philosophy from village life with his grandmother, he later attended schools in Ghana's capital Accra before attending Presbyterian Boys' Senior High School. Upon graduating, he trained at the College of Arts Kwame Nkrumah University of Science and Technology where he graduated with first-class honours and then later attained his master's degree from the same university. He worked as a lecturer and acting Head of Graphic Design Department for four years, leaving in 2013 to pursue a career as a full-time artist and social entrepreneur.

== Exhibitions ==
Kwame Akoto-Bamfo's first major exhibition was during the 60th Independence Day (Ghana) Celebration when he outdoored Nkyinkyim Installation sculptures of over 1,200 concrete portrait heads of people of African descent at the Kwame Nkrumah Mausoleum in an exhibition dubbed ‘Faux-Reedom’. Kwame used the strong imagery of life-size sculpted heads to question Ghana's independence and draw international attention to Ghana's neo-colonial legacies. Kwame's work toes a fine line between public art and activism. His works reference colonial legacies, racial justice, racial equity, healing and restorative justice. Kwame's travelling exhibition Blank Slate Palimpsest Monument, also known as the Blank Slate Monument, was unveiled in Ghana in 2019 and toured the United States, visiting notable places of historic significance to the 'African American Experience' such as Selma, Harlem and New York City's Times Square, where the monument was unveiled during the sentencing of Derek Chauvin for the murder of George Floyd. Other notable stops include Louisville Kentucky, Detroit's Motown Museum, Chicago's DuSable Museum and The King Center in Atlanta.

=== Nkyinkyim Installation ===
The Nkyinkyim Installation is an installation focused on African history and heritage, including a section regarding enslaved Africans. The installation is associated with The National Memorial for Peace and Justice, the Legacy Museum, and the works Dirge Across Time and Melancholic Lullabies.

== Other activities ==
=== Public speaking ===
Kwame Akoto-Bamfo is regularly engaged in public speaking, research, and lectures largely due to his work as a sculptor, archiving and promoting African history and cultural heritage at Nkyinkyim Museum.

=== Film and television ===
Year	Title	Role	Notes
2020	Enslaved	Self (one episode)	Documentary miniseries
2022	The Lost Ancestors	Self	Documentary short
2024	The Art of Healing Descendant Pain	Writer and executive producer	Documentary

- The Art of Healing Descendant Pain (2022 documentary, in post-production, Executive Producer and Co-writer)
- Enslaved (2020 miniseries)
- The Lost Ancestors

=== Awards ===
- GUBA Influential artist of the Year 2019
- Kuenyehia Prize for Contemporary Artist (Inaugural Winner)
