= Kobina Nyarko =

Kobina Nyarko is one of Ghana's premier young contemporary artists. Born March 14, 1972 in Takoradi, Ghana, much of Nyarko's recent work explores the symbolism of fish in paintings that feature numerous tiny fish on often large-scale canvases. This "trademark" theme makes his work easy to recognize.

Nyarko was formally trained at Kwame Nkrumah University of Science and Technology. He graduated in 2003 with a BA in Industrial Art.

In May 2007, Kobina Nyarko was featured in an exhibition at the San Diego Museum of Man, Artists Speak: Contemporary art from Ghana and Zimbabwe. His work is considered to be illustrative of 3rd generation Ghanaian artists, who freely express themselves as artists in a modern world, without succumbing to restrictive notions of African art.

== Personal life ==
Kobina Nyarko currently lives in Takoradi with his wife and son.

== Past exhibitions ==
- Busua Beach
- Panafest
- Golden Tulip
- Artist Alliance

== See also ==
- List of contemporary artists
