= Constance Swaniker =

Ghanaian sculptor, educator, and entrepreneur

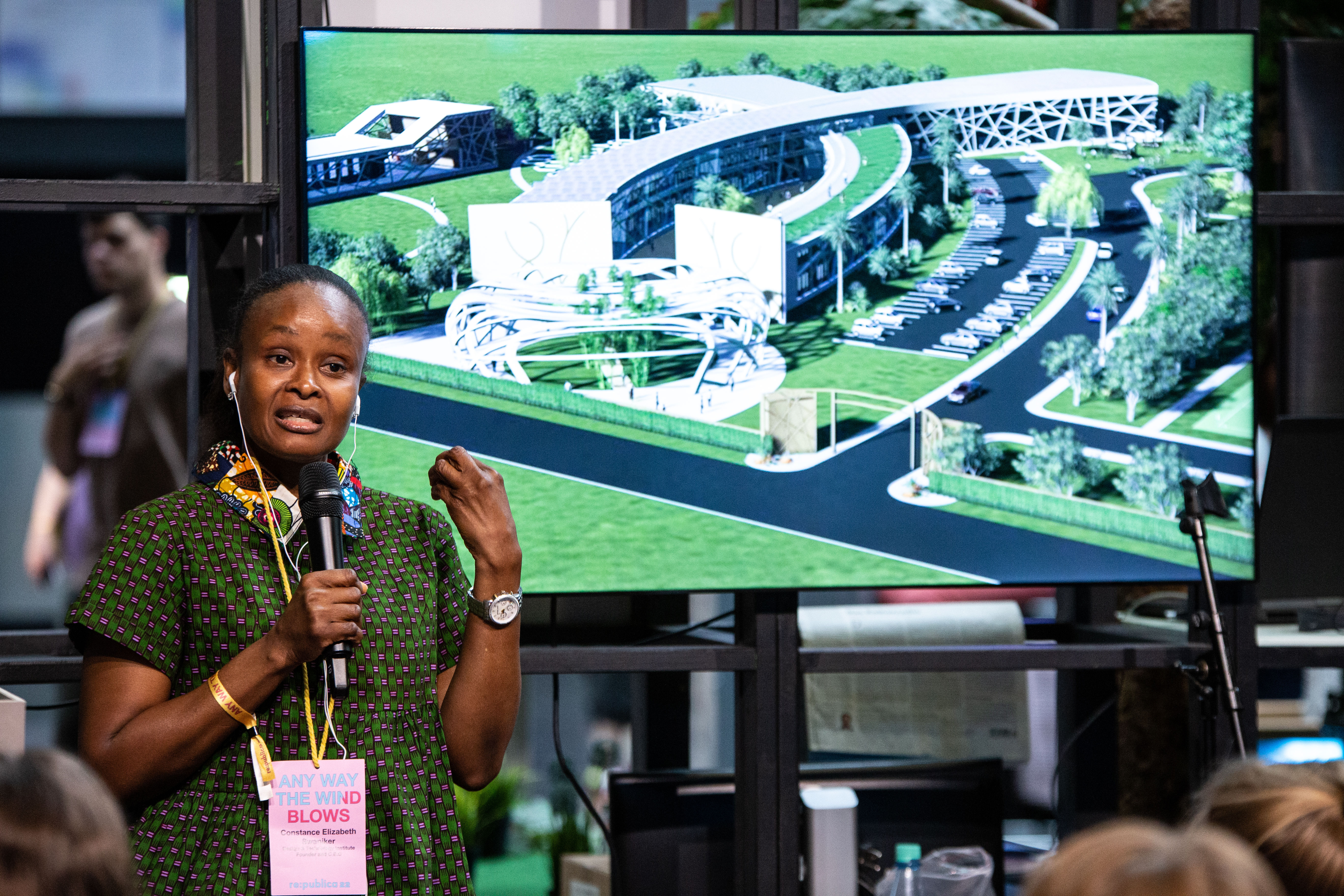
- Ghana beyond aid –– Constance Elizabeth Swaniker, Ralf Hermann
- Born: Constance Elizabeth Swaniker; 30 August 1973; Accra, Ghana
- Education: Accra Academy
- Alma mater: Kwame Nkrumah University of Science and Technology
- Occupations: Sculptor; Educator
- Writing career
- Notable works: Passage of Discover; 2011
- Notable awards: LISCO Be Your Dream; 2013

Constance Elizabeth Swaniker (born 30 August 1973) is a Ghanaian sculptor, educator, and entrepreneur. She is the founder and CEO of Accent & Arts and also the founder of Design and Technical Institute (DTI) in Accra.

== Early life and education ==
Swaniker was born on 30 August 1973 in Accra, Ghana. She had parts of her early education in Botswana, Zimbabwe, and The Gambia. She later entered the Accra Academy for secondary education, where she obtained her A-Level certificate in 1993. Following her secondary education, she enrolled at the Kwame Nkrumah University of Science and Technology to pursue a bachelor of Arts degree in Sculpture, after which she graduated in 1999.

== Career ==
While at the university, Swaniker worked as an apprentice specialising in carpentry at Art Deco Ltd. Six months after her graduation from Kwame Nkrumah University of Science and Technology, she founded Accents & Art Ltd a Ghanaian company that produces artistic products with wrought iron, cane and glass, and also incorporates the Design and Technology Institute (DTI).

Through partnerships with universities such the Kwame Nkrumah University of Science and Technology, Ashesi University, Takoradi Technical University, and Ho Technical University, Accent & Arts has been able to provide internships and contractual apprenticeships to over 600 youths since 2009.

In March 2016, Swaniker founded and became chief executive officer of the Design and Technical Institute (DTI), an academic institute that is intended to bridge the gap between academia and industry. Her dream is to use her story encourage more women enter vocations traditionally set aside for men.

== Works ==
Swaniker's works have been showcased in many exhibitions in Ghana and outside Ghana. They include her first exhibition; Passage of Discovery, which was held at the Alliance of Artists Gallery. The event run from 22 June to 6 July 2011. Her works were also showcased in the Juxtaposed, Light & Darkness exhibition which was held in Nike Arts and Cultural Centre buildings in Nigeria from 5 November to 14 November 2011. In March 2015, her works were showcased at the UNESCO head office in Paris.

== Honours ==
Swaniker's works have been recognised locally and internationally. In 2010, she was a recipient of The Network Journal Africa 40 under 40 Achievement award. That same year, she was recognised as the best entrepreneur by the SME Innovation Award scheme. In 2013 she was awarded the LISCO Be Your Dream Award, and Metal Product of the Year Award. That same year she was the Regional Country Winner of the Africa's Most Influential Women in Leadership and Governance Award. In 2014, her firm, Accent and Arts was the Country and Regional Winner of Metal fabrication company of the year award. In 2017 she was the recipient of Africa's Most Influential Women in Business and Government, and Woman of Excellence Awards during the Ghana manufacturing awards. She received another Ghana Manufacturing award in 2018.

== Personal life ==
Constance Swaniker is a dedicated mother of two (2).
