= Anita-Pearl Ankor =

Ghanaian painter

Anita-Pearl Mwinnabang Ankor
- Education: University of Ghana
- Occupation: Painter

Anita-Pearl Mwinnabang Ankor is a Ghanaian painter and muralist. She is popularly referred to as The Female Painter. In 2019, she posted a video on her Instagram page which showed herself artistically painting a wall. This video went viral on social media.

== Early years and education ==
Ankor is a native of Nandom, located in the Upper West Region of Ghana but she grew up in Accra. She had her primary education at University Primary and Junior High School. She proceeded to Mfantsiman Girls' Secondary School where she completed her secondary education. In 2011, she gained admission into the University of Ghana where she studied Agricultural Science and majored in Post Harvest Technology.

== Career ==
While in Level 400 at the University of Ghana, Ankor began doing pencil art and painting as her hobby. After graduating from school, she worked as a national service personnel at Swedru. She began her career in painting in 2015 after she got inspired from seeing the works of one painter. She founded and runs NYTAZ Arts, an art company. Her specialty is in doing murals, pencil arts, interior and exterior painting. In 2019, she posted a video on her Instagram page which showed her working on a wall. This video went viral on social media.

== Personal life ==
Ankor is a Christian. She likes to write short stories and poems, swim, play basketball, read novels and watch movies.
