= Frances Ademola =

Ghanaian artist, gallerist and former broadcaster (born 1928)

- Born: 17 July 1928 (age 98); Accra, Ghana
- Education: Achimota School; Westonbirt School; University of Exeter
- Occupations: Artist, gallerist and broadcaster
- Known for: Owner of "The Loom", the first private-owned gallery in Ghana

Frances Ademola (born 17 July 1928) is a Ghanaian artist, gallerist and former broadcaster. She is the owner of "The Loom", the first private-owned gallery in Ghana.

== Early life and education ==
Ademola was born on 17 July 1928 in Accra, Ghana. She had her early education at Government Girls' School from 1932 to 1939, then attended Achimota School from 1939 to 1944.

She had her tertiary education at Westonbirt School, in Tetbury, Gloucestershire, England, from 1946 to 1948, and she went on to study at the University of Exeter, England, from 1949 to 1953.

== Career ==
She moved to Nigeria, where she stayed for 12 years, before moving back to Ghana in 1969.

Ademola worked at the Gold Coast Broadcasting System, now known as Ghana Broadcasting Corporation, from 1954 to 1956 as a senior producer. She then moved to the Nigeria Broadcasting Corporation (NBC) from 1958 to 1960. She headed the Western Regional Programs of Nigeria Broadcasting Corporation (NBC) from 1960 to 1963 and later became proprietor.

== Personal life ==
She was married to Adenekan, son of Adetokunbo Ademola.
