= Grace Kwami =

Ghanaian artist

- Born: Grace Salome Kwami; 1923; Worawora, Oti Region, Gold Coast (now Ghana)
- Died: 2006 (aged 82–83)
- Education: Kwame Nkrumah University of Science and Technology
- Occupations: Teacher; Sculptor
- Children: Atta Kwami

Grace Salome Kwami (1923 – 2006) was a Ghanaian sculptor and educator.

== Early life and education ==
Kwami was born in 1923 at Worawora, a town in the Volta Region of Ghana (then Gold Coast). She enrolled at the Basel Mission's Women Teachers' Training College in Agogo. She continued at the Kumasi College of Arts (now Kwame Nkrumah University of Science and Technology) in 1951, where she studied arts.

A Girl in Red (Portrait of Gladys Ankora, Achimota), 1954

== Career ==
After her studies at Kwame Nkrumah University of Science and Technology, she was employed by the National Museum, where she worked as a sculptor from 1954 to 1957. She later worked as a teacher at Mawuli School and Tamale Teachers' Training College from 1957 to 1978.

== Exhibitions ==
Kwami's expertise were in sculpture, painting and jewellery. Her works have been curated in collections and exhibited in the National Museum of Ghana, the Volta Regional Museum, and the Ghana Museums and Monument Board.

Her work was recently included in African Modernism in America, 1947-67 exhibit at the Phillips Collection.

== Personal life ==
Kwami married Robert Kwami in 1954. She is the mother of the artist Atta Kwami. She died in 2006.
