= Betty Acquah =

Ghanaian feminist painter

- Born: 20 March 1965 (age 60)
- Education: Kwame Nkrumah University of Science and Technology, Tokyo School of Art, Japan.
- Occupation: Oil painting

Betty Acquah (born 20 March 1965) is a Ghanaian feminist painter. She uses the techniques of pointillism, oil painting and acrylic. Through her vibrant canvases, She captures the trials, ambitions, celebrations, and triumphs of women, weaving their stories into the fabric of her art.

== Early life and education ==
A native of Cape Coast in Ghana, she spent part of her schooling at Wesley Girls' Senior High School and Holy Child School. Then furthered at the Kwame Nkrumah University of Science and Technology where she obtained a master's degree in Visual Arts specializing in painting. Betty achieving a First Class in the B.A. Hons (Art) Degree course. Her pursuit of excellence led her to the M.F.A. (Painting) Degree program at the same institution. In Japan, she also completed a professional arts course at the Tokyo School of Art.

== Career ==
Acquah has been working for the art gallery of the Center for National Culture in Accra from 1989 to 1993 and has been curating exhibitions at the Berj Art Gallery from 2002 to 2005. She is a member of Ghana Association of Visual Artists. In June 2019, she said in an interview with Newsday BBC that she hoped for the opening of a national art gallery in Ghana.

Her work highlights the Ghanaian women she sees as the "unsung heroes of the republic of Ghana".

== Exhibition ==
Betty's first solo exhibition was showcased at PAFAM (Pan African Festival of Arts and Music), held at the Trade Fair in Accra.

Acquah has exhibited in Ghana, Nigeria, the United Kingdom, India, Germany, Spain, Japan and the United States of America.
