= Iris Kensmil =

Dutch artist (born 1970)

- Born: 1970 (age 55–56); Amsterdam, the Netherlands
- Known for: Painting
- Website: iriskensmil.nl

Iris Kensmil (born 1970) is a Dutch artist of Surinamese descent. Her work includes paintings, drawings, murals, and installations. She obtained her degree from the Academie Minerva in Groningen in 1996. In 2014, she became a juror for the Dutch Royal Award for Modern Painting. In 2019, she was one of two artists chosen to represent the Netherlands at the 58th Venice Biennale. She became a member of the Akademie van Kunsten, an organization founded by the Royal Netherlands Academy of Arts and Sciences, in 2023.

== Biography and education ==
Kensmil was born in Amsterdam, in 1970. She grew up in Paramibo and witnessed the independence of Suriname from the Netherlands. From 1992-1996, she returned to the Netherlands and studied Fine Arts at the Academie Minerva. She has attended artist residencies at the International Studio & Curatorial Program in New York City and the Tembe Art Studio in Moengo, Suriname.

== Career ==
Kensmil's artworks serve as a counter-narrative to the representation of Black people traditionally seen in Dutch culture and the European art historical canon. Her art is inspired by Black Feminist and other political perspectives, African-American art, literature, and music, and European modern art history.

She has been featured in many exhibitions throughout her career, including the “Becoming More" program (May 2017) at the Van Abbemuseum; “Black and Revolutionary: The Story of Hermina and Otto Huiswoud” (November 2017-July 2018) at The Black Archives; "Something Still Comes Back" at the Matthew Brown Gallery (May-June 2021); and "Some of My Souls" (October 2021-March 2022) at the Art Institute Melly. Additionally, her art has been acquired by Dutch cultural institutions like the Amsterdam Museum, Stedelijk Museum Amsterdam, The Black Archives, Centraal Museum, Museum Catharijneconvent, Van Abbemuseum, and the Kunstmuseum Den Haag. Outside of the Netherlands, her work can be seen in the collections of the Surinaams Museum in Paramaribo, Suriname and the FRAC Picardie in Amiens, France.
