= Kenturah Davis =

American artist

- Born: Altadena, California
- Occupations: sculptor, designer, performance art

Kenturah Davis (born 1980 in Altadena, California) is an American contemporary multidisciplinary artist and designer. She works in the mediums of sculpture, drafting, printmaking, painting, and performance art. Davis has lived between the cities of Los Angeles and New Haven in the United States, and Accra, Ghana.

== Education ==
Davis earned her BA degree from Occidental College in 2002; and a MFA degree from Yale University School of Art.

== Career ==
Davis' work explores the relationship between identity, language, and figurative mark-making. Davis works in a range of media from drawing to painting to sculpture to performance. Her work is in the collection of the Walker Art Center.

In 2020, Davis collaborated with the fashion label: Osei Duro. Davis was commissioned by Los Angeles Metro to create large-scale work that will be permanently installed in a site-specific location on the new K Line (Crenshaw/LAX) rail line.

In 2021, the Pérez Art Museum Miami acquired their work Black As the Most Exquisite Color (2019) as part of this institution's new acquisitions initiative. Davis's work was welcomed into PAMM's collection alongside artworks from Bisa Butler, Tania Bruguera, and Coco Fusco, among others.

In 2022, Ava DuVernay's portrait, by Davis, was revealed by the National Portrait Gallery.

Davis received the 2026 Creative Capital Award in Visual Arts to develop Rest Stops: Thriving in the Thresholds of Altadena, which integrates drawings, ceramic works, and objects from trees that were salvaged from the 2025 Eaton Fire as a reclamation of what was lost and an homage to the resilience of Altadena’s Black and Brown community.

== Exhibitions ==
=== Solo Exhibitions ===
- 2013, "Sonder" at Papillion in Los Angeles
- 2014, "Narratives and Meditations" at Papillion in Los Angeles
- 2019, "Blur in the Interest of Precision" at Mathew Brown Gallery in Los Angeles
- 2020, "Everything That Cannot be Known" at the SCAD Museum of Art in Georgia
- 2021, "(A)Float, (A)Fall, (A)Dance, (A)Death" at the Jeffrey Deitch Projects in New York City
- 2021, "apropos of air" at Matthew Brown Gallery in Los Angeles
- 2023, "Dark Illumination" at Oxy Arts in Los Angeles, CA
