= The Marx Lounge =

Art exhibition

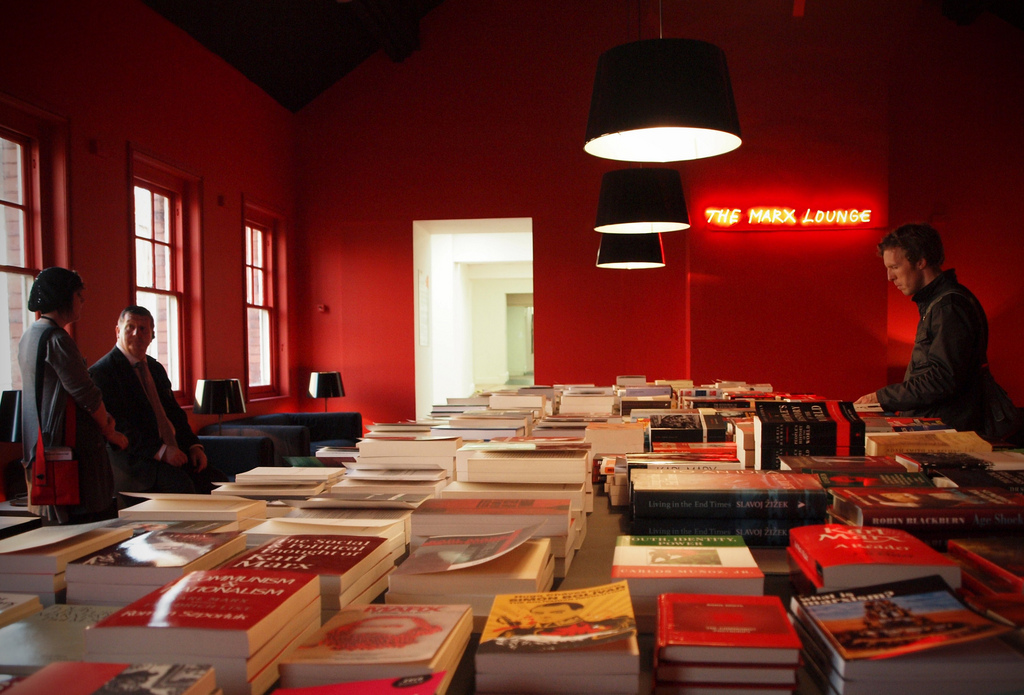
The Marx Lounge at the 2010 Liverpool Biennial.

The Marx Lounge is an art exhibition by the Chilean artist Alfredo Jaar. It was first presented at the Liverpool Biennial art exhibition in England in 2010 and was later shown at the Biennial again in 2016. The exhibit has subsequently been presented at the Stedelijk Museum Amsterdam's SMBA space and the Andalusian Center for Contemporary Art (CAAC). For the exhibition a large space was transformed into a red reading room with sofas, reading lamps and a large reading table on which a large collection of books was installed.

The texts displayed included about 350 publications concerning topics such as marxism, capitalism, neoliberalism, postcolonialism, politics, globalization and philosophy. Visitors were invited to sit and read the presented literature and the intent of the exhibition was to provide "a direct response to the financial crisis and to the fundamental questioning of the capitalist system it has elicited." Amongst the books were, apart from Marx’s work, books by Alain Badiou, Jacques Rancière, Antonio Negri, and Slavoj Žižek.

Of the exhibition, Jaar has stated that "I wanted people to stop in their tracks, because you can access the internet in your home and on your phones. There is so much technology today, but I think the book has this value of stopping you in your tracks of asking you to go deeper inside. I have the impression that technology keeps us on the surface."
