= James Cudjoe =

Ghanaian artist (born 1971)

James Cudjoe (born 7 September 1971) is a Ghanaian painter. He is one of Ghana's most successful contemporary artists and has been growing in popularity since the start of his career.

== Biography ==
James Cudjoe was born on 7 September 1971, in Takoradi, Ghana. He graduated from Ghana's private art college Ghanatta in 1996, and has since participated in seven highly successful national group and solo exhibitions. Cudjoe operates his own galleries in Accra and Takoradi, Ghana.

Cudjoe's work draws on images from everyday life. He is known for his cityscapes, which range from vibrant, colourful and energetic, such as Hot Day (in Osu), to calm, placid and subdued, such as New Beginnings I. He is also known to depict the African market woman, a figure he says represents his own mother, in scenes of labour or rest, such as Dancer, or the working woman of Good Returns III. Fans of his work find these paintings evocative, emotional and relatable. His growing popularity and success in Europe and the United States, as well as many other locations across the globe, is a testament to his skill and importance as an artist.

In May 2007, Cudjoe was featured in an exhibition at the San Diego Museum of Man, Artists Speak: Contemporary art from Ghana and Zimbabwe. His work is considered to be illustrative of third-generation Ghanaian artists, who freely express themselves as artists in a modern world, without succumbing to restrictive notions of African Art.

== Exhibitions ==
- 2004-National Theatre, Accra, Ghana
- 2003-Golden Tulip Hotel, Accra
- 2001-LA Palm Beach Hotel
- 2001-African Beach, Takoradi
- 2001-Shangrila Hotel
- 2000-Elmina Beach Resort, Elmina
- 2000-Art Centre National Exhibition
- 1998-Golden Tulip
- 1997-Arama Art Gallery, Accra
