= Atta Kwami =

Ghanaian artist (1956–2021)

- Born: George Atta Kwami; 14 September 1956; Accra, Ghana
- Died: 6 October 2021 (aged 65); UK
- Education: Kwame Nkrumah University of Science and Technology
- Occupations: Painter, printmaker, art historian and curator
- Spouse: Pamela Clarkson (m. 1992)
- Website: atta-kwami.com

Atta Kwami (14 September 1956 – 6 October 2021) was a Ghanaian painter, printmaker, independent art historian and curator. He was educated and taught at the Kwame Nkrumah University of Science and Technology (KNUST), Kumasi, Ghana, and in the United Kingdom. He created works that improvise form and colour and speak to uniquely Ghanaian architecture and African strip-woven textiles, including those of the Kente, the Ewe and Asante of Ghana.

== Early life and education ==
Born George Atta Kwami in 1956 in Accra to Robert Kwami, a music teacher, and prominent first generation Ghanaian contemporary artist Grace Kwami (nee Anku), he studied, and later taught, at the KNUST in Kumasi, Ghana. In 2007, he received a PhD in art history at the Open University for his work for contemporary Ghanaian artists, subsequently published as Kumasi Realism, 1951–2007: An African Modernism (Hurst & Company, 2013).

== Career ==
Kwami was awarded the title of 1st Thoyer Distinguished Visiting Scholar in New York University, New York, from 30 September to 8 October 2008.

Kwami also held the Philip L. Ravenhill Fellowship (UCLA) at the Smithsonian Institution, National Museum of African Art, Washington, DC, from 1 March to 31 May 2010.

He was Artist-in-Residence at the University of Michigan, Graduate School of Art & Design, in January 2011.

Kwami won the Janet L. Stanley Travel Award to attend the Fifteenth Triennial Symposium on African Art entitled "Africa and its Diasporas in the Market Place: Cultural Resources and the Global Economy" at the University of California, Los Angeles, from 23 to 26 March 2011.

Between 14 and 26 August 2011, Kwami undertook the Howard Kestenbaum/Vijay Paramsothy International Fellowship at Haystack Mountain School of Crafts, Maine, USA.

In 2021, he won the Maria Lassnig Prize from the Maria Lassnig Foundation in Vienna and the Serpentine Galleries in the UK.

== Exhibitions ==
Kwami's work has been exhibited in the Metropolitan Museum of Art in New York, National Museum of African Art, National Museum of Ghana, National Museum of Kenya, Victoria and Albert Museum, the World Museum, and the British Museum.

== Personal life ==
In 1992, Kwami married Pamela Clarkson, a painter and printmaker, whom he had met in 1991 when she set up a printmaking studio at the College of Art, Kwame Nkrumah University of Science and Technology. They divided their time between Kumasi, Ghana, and Loughborough, United Kingdom.

He died of cancer in the UK on 6 October 2021.
