= Albert Opoku =

Ghanaian Chereographer and Educator

- Born: Albert Mawere Opoku; 13/11/1915; Kumasi, Ghana
- Died: 2001
- Resting place: Ghana
- Education: Achimota Training College,Juilliard School, Martha Graham School
- Occupations: choreographer, dancer, painter, educator
- Employer: Government of Ghana
- Writing career
- Language: English, Twi
- Period: 1915-2001

Albert Mawere Opoku (1915–2001), was a Ghanaian choreographer, dancer, printmaker, painter, and educator. He was the first person to teach courses in African dance at the University of Ghana, Legon, and was also the founder and first director of the Ghana National Dance Ensemble.

== Early life and education ==
Opoku was born into an Asante royal family on 13 November 1915. His father Nana Mawere Opoku was the Asantehene's (king of the Asante kingdom) Okyeame (linguist). His mother Yaa Bemponma, on the other hand, was a renowned storyteller and the sister of the Asantehene's chief linguist, Kwasi Numah. Opoku was therefore a future linguist himself and was taught traditional lore from infancy. Opoku received his primary and secondary education at the Kumasi Government School from 1921 to 1931, and the Achimota Training College, from 1931 to 1934 respectively.

With the encouragement of H. V. Meyerowitz, he proceeded to the Achimota Special Arts Teachers School where he studied Fine Arts and Painting. In 1944, he gained admission to the Camberwell School of Art and Crafts, London, through the help of Meyerowitz. Following his studies at the Camberwell School of Art and Craft, he enrolled at the Central School of Art and Crafts, London in 1952, there, he studied a specialist Art Course. Opoku later read courses in Labanotation, Stage Craft, and Dance Techniques at the Juilliard School and the Martha Graham School in New York.

== Career ==
Between 1952 and 1957, Opoku taught graphic arts, especially composition on scraper board and wood engraving with the Art and Craft Specialist Course and the Diploma in Fine Art (DFA) course programmes of the School of Art, Kumasi College of Technology, now Kwame Nkrumah University of Science and Technology, Kumasi. Opoku came to the University of Ghana in 1962, when the then president of Ghana Kwame Nkrumah and Rex Nettleford, the Director of the Jamaican National Dance Company suggested the idea of creating a Ghana National Dance Ensemble. Opoku was tasked to document traditional dances from the various parts of the country. Under the directorship of Professor J.H. Nketia of the University of Ghana's Institute of African Studies, Opoku choreographed and arranged traditional dances which remained the standard repertoire of the Ghana Dance Ensemble.

Opoku designed the crest of the University of Ghana as well as founded the Ghana Dance Ensemble. His works include over 30 choreographic compositions that make up the foundations of various Ghanaian dance forms. Some of these include; Fontonfrom, Kpanlogo, Kete Apintim, Tokpey, Tora, and Have Etoi (also known as Boboobo).

Opoku passed on in 2001.

== Honors and awards ==
In 1975, the Grand Medal (Civil Division) was bestowed upon him by the then Ghanaian government for his service to the nation.
