= Dorothy Amenuke =

Ghanaian sculptor

- Born: 1968 (age 57–58); Adzokoe-Peki
- Citizenship: Ghanaian
- Education: Kwame Nkrumah University of Science and Technology (KNUST)
- Occupations: Ghanaian sculptor, fiber artist, and educator
- Known for: Sculpture

Dorothy Akpene Amenuke (born 1968), is a Ghanaian sculptor, fiber artist, and educator. She is currently a lecturer at the department of painting and sculpture at the Faculty of Fine Art, Kwame Nkrumah University of Science and Technology (KNUST).

== Early life ==
Amenuke was born in 1968 and comes from Adzokoe-Peki, in the Volta Region of Ghana. She studied sculpting at Ghana's Kwame Nkrumah University of Science and Technology (KNUST) as an undergraduate. She went on to KNUST for her MA degree in art education, MFA degree in sculpture, and PhD in sculpture.

== Career ==
She has worked professionally as an art teacher at the elementary and secondary school levels from 1987 to 2004. Work by Amenuke is in the collection of the Stedelijk Museum Amsterdam.

Dorothy’s work is based on fabrics and fibres, since fabrics and fibres traditionally, it speaks to that which is intimate, personal, and often related to the body.
