= Department of Planning =

Department of Planning may refer to:

== Government departments in Australia ==
- Department for Infrastructure and Transport, South Australia, formerly the Department of Planning, Transport and Infrastructure
- Department of Planning & Environment, New South Wales
- Department of Planning, Lands and Heritage (Western Australia)
- Department of Transport and Planning, Victoria
  - Department of Transport, Planning and Local Infrastructure, a former government department in Victoria

== Other uses ==
- KNUST Department of Planning, an academic department at Kwame Nkrumah University of Science and Technology in Kumasi, Ghana

== See also ==
- Howard County Department of Planning and Zoning, Maryland, U.S.
- National Planning Department (Colombia), a government department in Colombia
