= Lagos Photo =

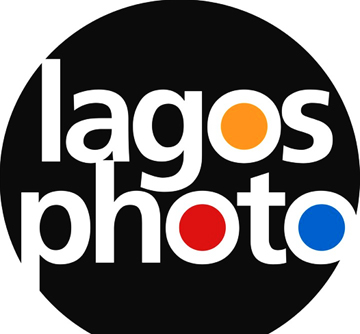
LagosPhoto Logo.

LagosPhoto Festival is the largest international photography festival in Nigeria and attracts over 20.000 visitors annually. Founded in 2010 by Azu Nwagbogu of the African Artists Foundation, the festival spotlights emerging and established photographers from Africa and internationally. With a strong focus on presenting historical and contemporary stories from the African continent, the month-long festival takes place at various indoor and outdoor venues and includes exhibitions, events, workshops, residencies, talks and digital programs. Some of the photographers and artists who have taken part are Viviane Sassen, Samuel Fosso, Hassan Hajjaj, Maimouna Guerresi, and Zanele Muholi.

== Editions ==
=== 2010: No Judgement: Africa Under the Prism ===
The inaugural edition leveraged on Nigeria's 50 years of Independence and was curated by Azu Nwagbogu, Caline Chagoury and Marc Prust. Participating photographers were required to have worked in Lagos, Nigeria or in Africa shooting works that interpreted the theme ‘No Judgement: Africa Under the Prism’.

=== 2011: What’s Next Africa? The Hidden Stories ===
The second edition presented the hidden stories on the continent as opposed to the mis-represented, over-represented, sensationalized and dramatic images commonly covered with the power of photography. Titled ‘What’s Next Africa? The Hidden Stories’, the festival was curated by Azu Nwagbogu, Caline Chagoury, Marc Prust and Medina Dugger.

=== 2012: Seven Days in the Life of Lagos ===
Titled ‘Seven Days in the Life of Lagos,’ the festival was aimed at capturing the energy and vibrancy of Lagos. A city of extreme contradictions, Lagos transforms with the fast pace of urban migration and the explosion of development and technology that is dissolving barriers and leading to new types of interaction. The festival was curated by Azu Nwagbogu, Caline Chagoury, Stanley Greene, Medina Dugger and Joseph Gergel.

=== 2013: The Mega City and the Non-City ===
‘The Megacity and the Non-City’ explored how the development of urban centers in Africa and photography has transformed our sense of place in a globally connected world. The 21st century has been characterised by the rise of the megacity, with cities such as Lagos transitioning and adapting to vast changes taking place at an unprecedented speed. By situating photography at the core of their practice, the artists investigated the circulation of images in our society, their mass consumption and capacity to document personal and collective world-views. The festival was curated by Azu Nwagbogu.

=== 2014: Staging Reality, Documenting Fiction ===
'Staging Reality, Documenting Fiction' showcased contemporary photographers in Africa who delved into the connection between beliefs and truths. By incorporating conceptual and performative strategies that go beyond traditional photographic practices, the artists challenged the confines of the photojournalistic gaze. Their works reflected a departure from conventional approaches, addressing complex social and political issues that define twenty-first-century Africa. The artists looked at alternative futures and how to construct fictive worlds, employing photography as a catalyst to probe the evolving realities of contemporary Africa. The festival was curated by Azu Nwagbogu.

=== 2015: Designing Futures (sixth, 2015) ===
The LagosPhoto Festival's sixth edition, themed "Designing Futures," looked at African design, and our understanding of how we shape Africa as the central platform for discussing our historical, present, and future aspirations. The creation of images, identities, desires, ecologies, and cultures was explored through various mediums, including advertising, textiles, portraiture, and both factual and conceptual photography. These diverse avenues question how we process, navigate, and envision the possibilities within the realms of a future Africa. The festival was curated by Cristina de Middel. The festival was curated by Azu Nwagbogu.

=== 2016: Inherent Risk; Rituals and Performance ===
The central theme of the seventh edition, "Inherent Risk; Rituals and Performance," explored the constructed notions of gender, image, identity, social agency and power dynamics in contemporary society. The festival showcased the works of 30 photographers from 17 countries. The festival was curated by Azu Nwagbogu.

=== 2017: Regimes of Truth ===
The 2017 iteration of the LagosPhoto Festival prompted artists to contemplate the prevailing systems of truths and beliefs, questioning the diminishing significance of the pursuit of reality in our era. In contemporary times, photography has emerged as the modern repository for this fading quest for reality, not merely due to its perceived freedom, but rather because it encapsulates the synthesis and exposes the contradictions inherent in the knowledge society and its imperative for creativity. The festival was curated by Azu Nwagbogu.

=== 2018: Time has Gone ===
Under the theme "Time Has Gone," the focus the festival explored contemporary dialogues encompassing various aspects of time. Artists from diverse corners of the world engaged in discussions on the notion of urgency. Each artist investigated practices of archiving, preserving and envisioning an Afro-centric future, concluding a 'time that is up'. The festival was curated by Azu Nwagbogu, Eva Barois de Caeval, Charlotte Langhorst, Wunika Mukan, Valentine Umansky.

=== 2019: Passports ===
Passports was the theme of the 10th edition of LagosPhoto Festival and asked the question ‘What are the options of living freely in a world that will be determined by borders?’ Artists of different nationalities were invited to explore options of a fluid world, where nationality, gender, and historical imbalances are secondary. The festival was curated by Azu Nwagbogu, Charlotte Langhorst and Maria-Pia Bernardoni.

Special Programmes

- Fast Forward
- Portrait of Humanity
- Women Through the Lens

=== 2020: Rapid Response Restitution ===
For its eleventh edition, the festival focused on the theme ‘Rapid Response Restitution’, looking at the prospect of a decolonial "citizens' history." Utilizing the democratic medium of photography, LagosPhoto established a Home Museum featuring over two hundred participants from the African Continent, the US, South America, China, and Europe.

The launch of Home Museum’s open call in May 2020 was synchronous with the virulent first wave of the COVID-19 pandemic. With mobility and access to exhibitions severely hampered, AAF began to imagine a new way of building a digital museum through an extended concept of the home. The Home Museum served as a prototype for a citizens' institution, where every member of society actively could contribute to the communal understanding of cultural values and directly engage with questions of restitution, eliminating delays in the process. The festival was curated by Azu Nwagbogu, Dr. Clémentine Deliss, Dr. Oluwatoyin Sogbesan, and Asya Yaghmurian

=== 2021: Memory Palace ===
The twelfth edition of the annual LagosPhoto introduced the theme "Memory Palace," delving into the connections between humans and memory. It explores the transformative capacity of photography and images to ignite visual intellect, restoring fading and lost memories. The discourse evolved from the concept of the previous year’s festival of the Home Museum to the Memory Palace. This year's theme ‘Memory Palace’ looked at reimagining heritage and history relating to Africa and its diasporas. As part of the programm, the exhibition Things Fall Apart – Film Stills by Stephen Goldblatt was presented as a large-scale installation in public urban space. The photographs were taken in Nigeria in 1970 and were found by chance in an external archive of the Deutsche Kinemathek in Berlin. The project was later celebrated in Nigeria as one of the ten cultural highlights of the year. The festival was curated by Azu Nwagbogu and included a talk by Ibrahim Mahama.

Special Programmes

- Taurus - Obayomi Anthony exhibition
- Youths and Protest in Nigeria exhibition

=== 2022: Remember Me - Liberated Bodies, Charged Objects ===
"Remember Me - Liberated Bodies, Charged Objects" was the theme of the 13th edition of the LagosPhoto Festival. It questioned the subjectivity inherent in (colonial) archives and encouraged the creation of sustainable new models guided by both ancestral and contemporary wisdom. This year, the collaboration with the Modern Art Film Archive in Berlin was continued and the exhibition The Respectful Gaze - from the estate of Nina Fischer-Stephan was presented as a large-scale installation at Tinubu Square. The project was developed in collaboration with the Iwalewahaus and academics from Africa Multiple Cluster of Excellence of the University of Bayreuth and Unilag Lagos. The short documentary Nina Fischer-Stephan's Respectful Gaze by Mallam Mudi Yahaya premiered at the African Film Festival in New York and was subsequently published on the British hybrid platform Journal of African Cultural Studies. The festival was curated by Azu Nwagbogu.

=== 2023: Ground State - Fellowship within the Uncanny ===
The theme for this year, "Ground State – Fellowship within the Uncanny," explores how to revive, mend, and restore the enigmatic histories vital for our survival. The festival was curated by Peggy Sue Amison.

Special Programmes

- Ground to Remember by the Photographic Collective
- Listening to the Deepness by Como ser Fotografa
- Regarding the Pain of Others

== See also ==
- Addis Foto Fest
- African Photography Encounters
- Art biennials in Africa
