= Felicia Abban =

Ghanaian photographer (1936/1937–2024)

- Born: Felicia Ansah; 1936/1937; Sekondi, Gold Coast
- Died: 4 January 2024 (aged 87); Accra, Ghana
- Occupation: Photographer
- Years active: 1953–2013
- Known for: Ghana's first female professional photographer
- Spouse: Richard Bonsu Abban

Felicia Ewuraesi Abban (née Ansah; 1936/1937 – 4 January 2024) was Ghana's first female professional photographer. She worked as a photographer for the country's first president, Kwame Nkrumah, for a number of years during the 1960s.

== Early life ==
Felicia Abban was born in the Western Region of Ghana and grew up in a seaside town named Sekondi-Takoradi. She was the eldest of six children and quickly followed her father's, J. E. Ansah, footsteps in photography, becoming his apprentice at the age of 14.

Abban studied under him for the next four years working on her craft and at the age of 18, she relocated from Takoradi to Accra, where she set up her own studio. In a few months she opened up her business, "Mrs. Felicia Abban's Day and Night Quality Art Studio" in the centre of Jamestown, Accra in 1955.

Felicia's husband, Richard Abban, designed the fabric with Kwame Nkrumah's portrait on flowers with a map of Ghana for the country's independence celebrations in 1957. Abban's studio was also close to other studios, including J. K. Bruce Vanderpuije's "Deo Gratias" and James Barnor's "Ever Young Studio". They also contributed to the history of Ghanaian photographers during this time period. This was still before Ghana's independence and Deo Gratias is the oldest photography studio still in operation in Accra. It was established by Tamakloe's grandfather James Koblah Bruce-Vanderpuije in 1922, it earned a reputation for documenting key events in the country's history. James Barnor's photography studio in the early 1950s captured intimate moments of luminaries and key political figures, including Ghana's first prime minister, Kwame Nkrumah, as he pushed for pan-African unity and independence from colonial rule. In Abban's early career she also worked for the Guinea Press Limited, now known as The Ghana Times, which was also the publishing house of Nkrumah's Convention People's Party when he became president.

== Photography career ==
Spanning 50 years, Abban's photography career began when she learned photography from her father, and became his only female apprentice at the time. Ghana's first female photographer, she went on to become one of the continent's most respected photo artists of her day – on the payroll of Kwame Nkrumah and a detailed analyst of her country's transformation. She was widely known for her self-portraits, especially ones she took before an event as a way to promote her business from the 1950s to 1970s. Abban established her studio in Accra in 1955 and took on other women as apprentices. She was then recognized as one of Ghana's earliest instrumental female photographers projecting the contemporary African narrative through the lens.

During the early independence, her portraits also used clothing as the main expression of her identity and were used as "calling cards" around her own muses. Her self-portraits resembled fashion magazine images with an added more contemporary context. What is consistent throughout these diverse photographs is the way in which Abban used clothing to visibly articulate a feminine identity that played with the traditional and contemporary in an artful hybridity described as urbane and trans-Atlantic.

The first public display of her work was curated by Nana Oforiatta Ayim and staged at ANO's gallery in March 2017 and the gallery has plans of transforming her studio into a museum in her honour. The museum, when completed, will help preserve her work further serving as a hub to support upcoming artists. Nana Oforiatta Ayim also curated Ghana Freedom the first Ghanaian Pavilion at the Venice Biennale in 2019, which included Abban among the six artists chosen. Abban's portraits and self-portraits rendered a moment in Ghanaian history through her own female gaze that captured not only their style but also attitude during its time.

Abban's work was also showcased in the 12th edition of the 2019 Bamako Encounters. Abban's private photo collection consists of self-portraits before she attended events. She retired from photography as a result of a worsening arthritis condition.

Abban died in Accra on 4 January 2024, at the age of 87.

== Personal life ==
Abban was married to Robert Abban, the man who designed the fabric to commemorate Ghana's independence celebration in 1957 with Kwame Nkrumah's portrait featured on flowers with the Ghana map. Robert Abban was the creative director of former Ghana Textiles and Manufacturing Company (GTMC). Felicia Abban played a role in mentoring seminal filmmaker Kwaw Ansah, as well as the fashion designer Kofi Ansah, both of whom are her siblings. She was also the sibling of JKE Ansah, Tumi Ansah, Kwaw Ansah and Kofi Ansah.
