= Uche Uzorka =

Visual Artist

- Born: 1974 (age 51–52); Delta State| Nigeria
- Known for: painting, collage, charcoal and ink drawing
- Notable work: Drawing and painting
- Awards: won first place in Nigeria's National Art Competition.

Uche Uzorka is a Nigerian artist. In 2011, he and Chike Obeagu won first place in Nigeria's National Art Competition. Uzorka fuses various media in his work to examine the processes of urban street culture.

== History ==
Uche Uzorka was born in Delta State, Nigeria, in 1974 and graduated from the University of Nigeria, Nsukka, in 2001, with a major in painting. In exploring urban street cultural processes, Uzorka's approach encompasses painting, collage, charcoal, and ink drawing. In 2011, Uzorka received First Place in the Nigerian National Art Competition for a work co-produced with Chike Obeago.

== Work and career ==
Uche got a late start in drawing and painting, showing no evident indicators of artistic skill until he was well into his third year of high school. His first sketch was of an uncle he'd never met before, whose resemblance he drew from an old passport photo. He dabbled in sculpture, experimented with forms and clay, and eventually discovered his passion for drawing and painting. Uzorka resigned himself to remaining indoors all day drawing, sketching, and perfecting his technique until he was admitted as an art student at UNN in 1997. As a timid and introverted child and young adult, Uche states that many of his former classmates and friends are still surprised by his success in the art world.

Uche Uzorka: The Organic, his first solo show, was displayed in October 2012 at the Goethe-Institut Nigeria in collaboration with the African Artists' Foundation. Uzorka's second solo exhibition, Line.Sign.Symbol took place in January 2013 at the African Artists' Foundation.
