= Everything Precious Is Fragile =

2024 art exhibition in Venice, Italy

Everything Precious Is Fragile is an art exhibition organized by the curatorial team of Yassine Lassissi and Franck Houndégla led by Azu Nwagbogu for Benin's first national pavilion at the 2024 Venice Biennale.
