= Bernard Akoi-Jackson =

Ghanaian artist and writer

Bernard Akoi–Jackson
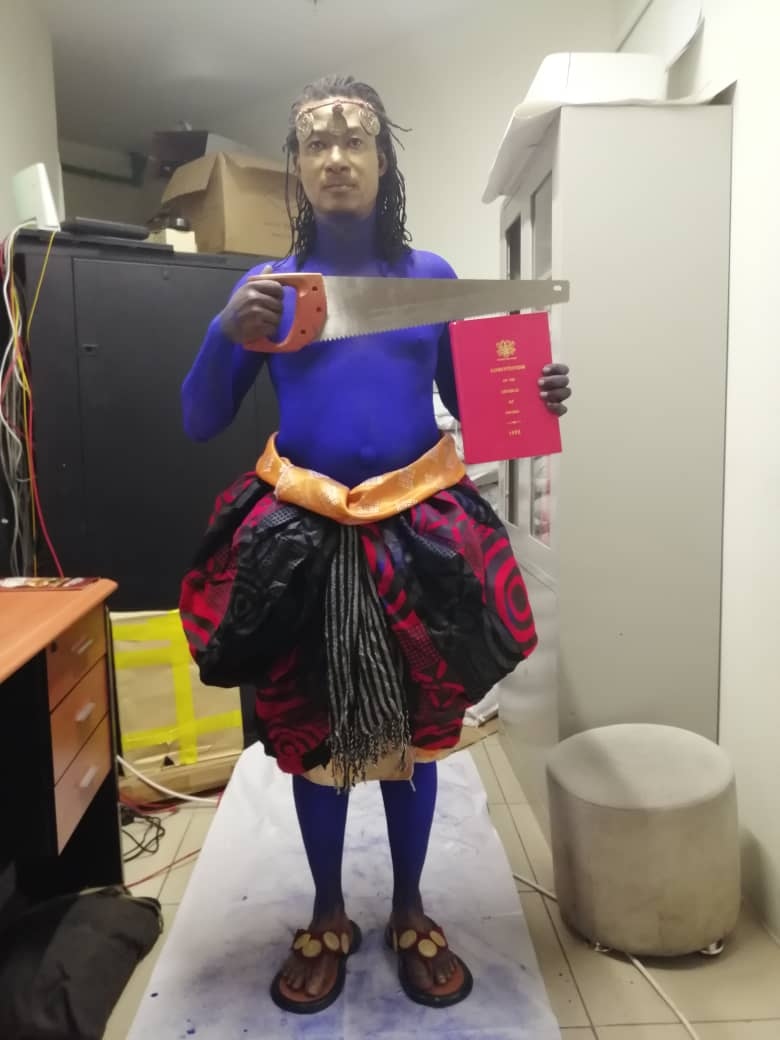
- A picture of Bernard Akoi-Jackson backstage to speak at TEDx Ahodwo, Kumasi
- Born: 1979 (age 46–47); Ghana
- Education: Presbyterian Boys' Secondary School; Kwame Nkrumah University of Science and Technology(BFA)(MFA)(PhD)
- Occupations: Artist, educator, writer
- Known for: Installation art, performance art, poetry, video art, photographer, dancer, poet, academic

Bernard Akoi–Jackson (born 1979), is a Ghanaian academic, artist and writer. He is known for projects that are in continual metamorphosis. His art works are mostly performative, or pseudo-rituals. His writings are focused on the development of contemporary African, Ghanaian visual arts and culture in poetic and jovial manner. He is known as a proverbial jester (or Esu) using critical absurdity to move between installations, dance and poetry, video, and photography. He blends post-colonial African identities through transient and makeshift memorials.

== Early life and education ==
Akoi-Jackson attended Presbyterian Boys' Secondary School, for his secondary school education. He holds a Bachelor of Fine Arts, Master of Fine Arts and PhD in Painting and Sculpture from the College of Art and Built Environment, Kwame Nkrumah University of Science and Technology.

== Career ==
In August 2006, he had his first residency at Kofi Setordj's ArtHAUS where he developed his project '' REDTAPEONBOTTLENECK '' as a participatory performance. He had residencies with Stedelijk Museum as "Global-artist-in-residency between 2013 and 2014 and at the Thiami Mnyele artists' residency in Amsterdam. He is a lecturer at the College of Art and Built Environment, Kwame Nkrumah University of Science and Technology.

== Exhibitions ==
- Material Effects: Contemporary Art from West Africa and the diaspora at Eli and Edythe Broad Art Museum at Michigan State University
- Spaghetti Harvest, Project 88 Mumbai, India
- Lilith Performance studio Malmo, Sweden
- SCCA – the Savannah Centre for Contemporary Art, Tamale (Ghana)
- SaNsA in Accra (2007)
- SaNsA in Kumasi (2009)
- Xerem International Artists’ Residency Home & Abroad in Portugal (2010)
- Moderator of Architecture of Independence in Kumasi (2018)

== See also ==
- Ibrahim Mahama (artist)
