= KNUST Department of Planning =

Academic department in Kumasi, Ghana

- Parent institution: Kwame Nkrumah University of Science and Technology
- Location: Kumasi, Ghana
- Website: http://planning.knust.edu.gh/

The KNUST Department of Planning (DOP) is one of the academic departments at the Kwame Nkrumah University of Science and Technology in Kumasi, Ghana. It is under the College of Art and Built Environment, specifically under the Faculty of Built Environment. The department offers undergraduate and postgraduate programmes in the award of a degree. It is the only institution in Ghana professionally recognized by its government to train personnel to promote, coordinate and manage development at the national and sub-national levels.

== History ==
Planning education in Ghana began in 1958 with the establishment of a planning programme in the School of Architecture, Planning and Building of the Kumasi College of Arts, Science and Technology. The programme prepared students for the intermediate examinations of the Town Planning Institute of Great Britain. After passing the intermediate examination, students were sent to universities in Great Britain to obtain full professional qualifications. In 1961, the United Nations assisted the Government of Ghana to establish an Institute for Community Planning on the Campus of Kumasi College of Arts, Science and Technology. The objective of the institute was to train and educate planners at the sub-professional level. Students who completed the two-year programme were awarded Diplomas of the institute. It had an annual intake of 20 students.

In 1963, the Institute for Community Planning was absorbed by the newly created Faculty of Architecture of the Kumasi College, whose status had been raised a year earlier to that of a university. The duration of the diploma programme was extended to three years by the faculty. The programme was discontinued in 1977 because applicants for the programme tended to have the same qualification as those admitted to the degree course.

Within the first decade, the faculty instituted a new programme leading to a Bachelor of Science (B.Sc.) Degree in Design in the new Kwame Nkrumah University of Science and Technology. The programme permitted graduates to pursue postgraduate degrees in architecture, Planning or Building Technologies, but the idea of a combined first degree for all three fields was not very successful because most of the graduating students opted for architecture, the more lucrative practice. As a result, separate undergraduate degrees in the three professional fields were instituted in 1969 with a first year programme structured for all the disciplines. A B.Sc. Planning Degree Programme was commenced that year.

After a decade, the M.Sc. DEPP Programme became competitive to the point that the Academic Board approved a "sandwich" version of the programme for those who were not able to enroll as regular students. The sandwich version of the programme increased the number of graduates who could be trained in Development Policy and planning; and assisted potential students who might not be able to leave their jobs for two continuous years to pursue graduate education in the programme; introduced the first self finance graduate Programme in the Department of Planning; and accelerated the process of graduating students to fill the gap between development policy and development planning in Ghana.

In 1985, the department established a joint postgraduate programme in Development Planning and Management in collaboration with the Department of Spatial Planning, University of Dortmund in Germany. Codenamed SPRING (“Spatial Planning for Regions in Growing Economies”), the two-year programme initially required international attendance, with the first year spent at Dortmund and the second in Ghana. In 2003, this changed so that the entire two years were served in Ghana. An average of 10 students per year, drawn from all over Africa, participate in the programme.

The 1990s saw considerable restructuring. First, in the 1994/1995 academic year, the new modified Master of Science (M.Sc.) Programme in Regional Development Planning was launched. Created in 1964, the programme had been suspended in 1984 to permit reorganization. 1997 saw the restructuring of the M.Phil. Programme in Development Studies, which had been established in 1980. Created to provide opportunity for candidates graduating from the B.Sc. Planning Degree Programme, the programme was enlarged to give opportunity to candidates with knowledge in development planning related sciences and disciplines. As a result, two new M.Phil. Programmes were created: M.Phil. in Planning and M.Phil. in Development Studies. At the same time, two streams of PhD Programmes were established: the Ph.D. in Planning and Ph.D. in Development Studies.

The following year, another international collaboration in learning and research came into fruition when an agreement was reached between the Department of Human Settlements; the Royal Danish Academy of Fine Arts, Copenhagen, Denmark; the Department of Planning, Kwame Nkrumah University of Science and Technology; and the Danish Ministry of Foreign Affairs, DANIDA, concerning DANIDA's support of a research assistant to a project at the department. The project, “Community Initiatives and Democratization of Planning Practice in Ghana”, dubbed ENRECA Project has since been offering support to the MPhil Planning Programme.

== Mission and goals ==
The department's mission is to train skilled personnel required to formulate and manage various development policies and programmes at all levels of national development. Examples of such policies and programmes include the National Vision of Socio-Economic Development which is required by the 1992 Constitution, the economic management programme, the Poverty Reduction Strategies and the ongoing decentralization policy.

The department's policy is to:

- augment its service to government and the nation in development planning and administration with particular reference to national economic management, decentralization and accelerated growth strategy;
- To limit the need to rely upon out-of-country resources for postgraduate studies; and
- To offer programmes on an all–Africa basis to provide an international Centre for planning education and to generate income for the department.

In line with national objectives for tertiary education and the university expectations, the department aims to provide cost-effective training of its students and to increase access for women at all levels. It also seeks to provide training through continuing education to individuals already in service in sectoral ministries, Regional Coordinating Councils, District Assemblies, parastatals, and private sector organizations including NGO’s. Its objectives include increasing intake of postgraduate students and intensifying extramural activities through distance education, continuing education and provision of further assistance to needy communities and districts.

The department's vision for future development is to increase the direct relevance of its activities — teaching, research and outreach programmes as well as community works – to the socio-economic and spatial development needs of Ghana, Africa and other developing economies. To that end, it has short-, medium- and long-term goals to reorganize by assigning staff, especially in areas more critical to the development needs of the country. Its plans involve strengthening and improving teaching at the undergraduate level while, at the postgraduate level, improving existing courses and building staff capacity which will lead to the development of new programmes, including doctoral studies.

== Academic programmes ==
The department runs the following academic programmes:

- B.Sc (Four-Year Programme in Development Planning)
- B.Sc (Four-Year Programme in Human Settlement Planning)
- M.Sc (Two-Year Programme in Development Planning and Management)
- M.Sc (Two-Year Programme in Development Policy and Planning on both Regular and Sandwich Bases)
- MPhil. in Planning
- MSc./MPhil Development Studies
- Ph.D. in Planning and Development Studies
- MSc. Planning, Monitoring and Evaluation.
- MSc./MPhil. Transportation Planning

== Undergraduate programmes ==
=== BSc. Development Planning ===
The Undergraduate Development Planning Programme is a four-year course leading to the award of Bachelor of Science (B.Sc.) Degree in Planning. The course introduces students to the formulation of economic, social and environmental policies and programmes together with their poverty and distributive implications. It deals with policy formulation at the national, regional and local levels but considerable emphasis is given to local level development and implications of national and regional policies for implementations at the grassroots. The programme also aims at developing the skills of students to assist in activities which:

- Increase production;
- Restructure rural economies;
- Improve the development and management of district economies;

=== BSc. Human Settlement Planning ===
This is a four-year programme leading to the award of Bachelor of Science (B.Sc.) Degree in Human Settlement Planning. The programme trains the professional manpower required for the planning and management of the growing urban and rural settlements in Ghana. This programme has been launched as a result of a shortage of Settlement Planners in Ghana to face settlement management problems within Metropolitan, Municipal and District Assemblies.

== Postgraduate programmes ==
=== M.Sc. Development Planning and Management ===
This programme dubbed "Spatial Planning for Regions in Growing Economies]" is an international M.Sc. Programme in Regional Development and Management for professionals from particularly developing countries. It is jointly organized by the Faculty of Spatial Planning (Fakultat Raumplanung), University of Dortmund, Germany and the Department of Planning, Kwame Nkrumah University of Science and Technology, Kumasi.

=== M.Sc. Development Policy and Planning ===
The programme trains personnel in Development Policy and Planning with multidisciplinary and integrated planning skills. The objectives of the programme are:

- To equip graduates with the skills for the formulation of national development policies from the economic, social and spatial perspectives;
- To equip graduates with the knowledge which would enable them to prepare perspective, medium and short-term plans for national, sectoral, and sub-national development;
- To provide graduates with the skills needed for the formulation, implementation, management and evaluation of national and sectoral development policies and plans.

The interdisciplinary programme concentrates in macro-economic policy, social policy and spatial organization policy. Embedded in the structure are options for sub-specializations in sectoral policies such as health, education, transportation and communications and energy. The programme is based on a course unit system and offers a course structure of study combining applied macro-economics, development economics, quantitative analysis, project appraisal, and the techniques of social and spatial analysis with the wider issues of national development and economic management.

=== M.Phil ===
There are two streams of the M.Phil. Programme: M.Phil. Degree in Development Studies and M.Phil. Degree in Planning. The former seeks to promote academic research and advancement of knowledge in development related sciences. The latter seeks to promote academic research and advancement of knowledge in planning science and practices as a profession.

=== Ph.D ===
The postgraduate programme by Research (Ph.D.) has two streams: Ph.D. in Development Studies and Ph.D. in Planning. The former is intended to promote academic research and advancement of knowledge in development planning related sciences. The latter is intended to promote academic research and advancement of knowledge in planning sciences and practice as a profession.

== Leadership ==
1. Prof. Charles Peprah - Head of Department
2. Prof. Eric Oduro-Ofori - Undergraduate Coordinator
3. Dr. Stephen Appiah Takyi - Postgraduate Coordinator
4. Dr. Michael A. Nanor - Examinations Officer
5. Dr. Michael Osei Asibey - Examinations Officer

== Notable alumni ==
1. Prof. Kwasi Kwafo Adarkwa
