= Palazzo Diedo – Berggruen Arts & Culture =

Palace in Venice for contemporary art

Coordinates: 45.4436°N 12.3320°E

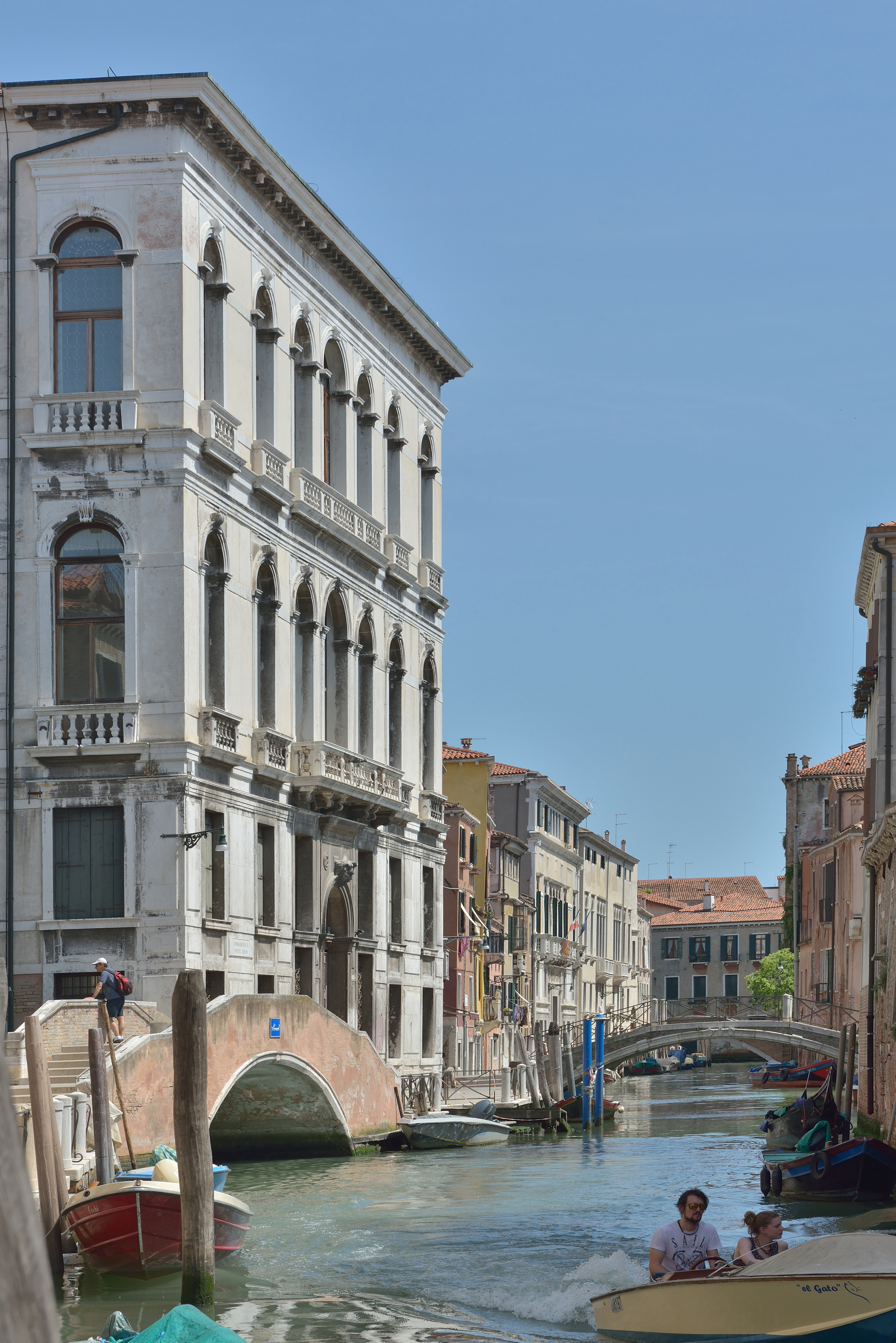
- Interactive map of the Palazzo Diedo – Berggruen Arts & Culture area

General information
- Location: Venice, Italy, Fondamenta Diedo, 2386, Cannaregio
- Year built: 1710–1720
- Opened: 2024
- Owner: Nicolas Berggruen

Design and construction
- Architect: Andrea Tirali

Palazzo Diedo is a historic building in Venice, located in the Cannaregio district and constructed in the early 18th century. In 2022, it was acquired by Nicolas Berggruen, who designated it as the headquarters of Berggruen Arts & Culture, a cultural center dedicated to exploring the intersections between visual art and contemporary culture, closely connected with Venice's ancient crafts.

== History ==
Palazzo Diedo was built between 1710 and 1720, designed by architect Andrea Tirali as the residence of the esteemed Diedo family. Situated along the Rio di Santa Fosca, the five-story building covers about 4,000 square meters, featuring two grand floors ("piani nobili") and a mezzanine.

After the Diedo family's bankruptcy, the building was purchased by the City of Venice in 1889. Over the following decades, it hosted various municipal institutions. For years, it served as an elementary school, and in 1989 it was assigned to the Ministry of Justice, housing both a magistrate's court and prosecutor's office, eventually becoming the location for the supervisory court in 1993.

In 2012, when the supervisory court moved to the Justice Citadel at Piazzale Roma, Palazzo Diedo returned to the City of Venice's management.

== Berggruen Arts and Culture ==
In 2022, collector and philanthropist Nicolas Berggruen, founder of the Berggruen Institute, acquired Palazzo Diedo to establish Berggruen Arts & Culture, a new center for contemporary art and culture. After two years of restoration under the supervision of the Silvio Fassi studio, the palazzo opened to the public on April 20, 2024, coinciding with the 60th Venice Biennale, featuring the exhibition "Janus," curated by Mario Codognato, director of Berggruen Arts & Culture, and Adriana Rispoli, curator of Berggruen Arts & Culture.

Beginning in 2026, Palazzo Diedo will host an artist residency program in collaboration with Venetian artisans skilled in traditional crafts such as glass, ceramics, textiles, and metalwork.

== Architecture and decorations ==
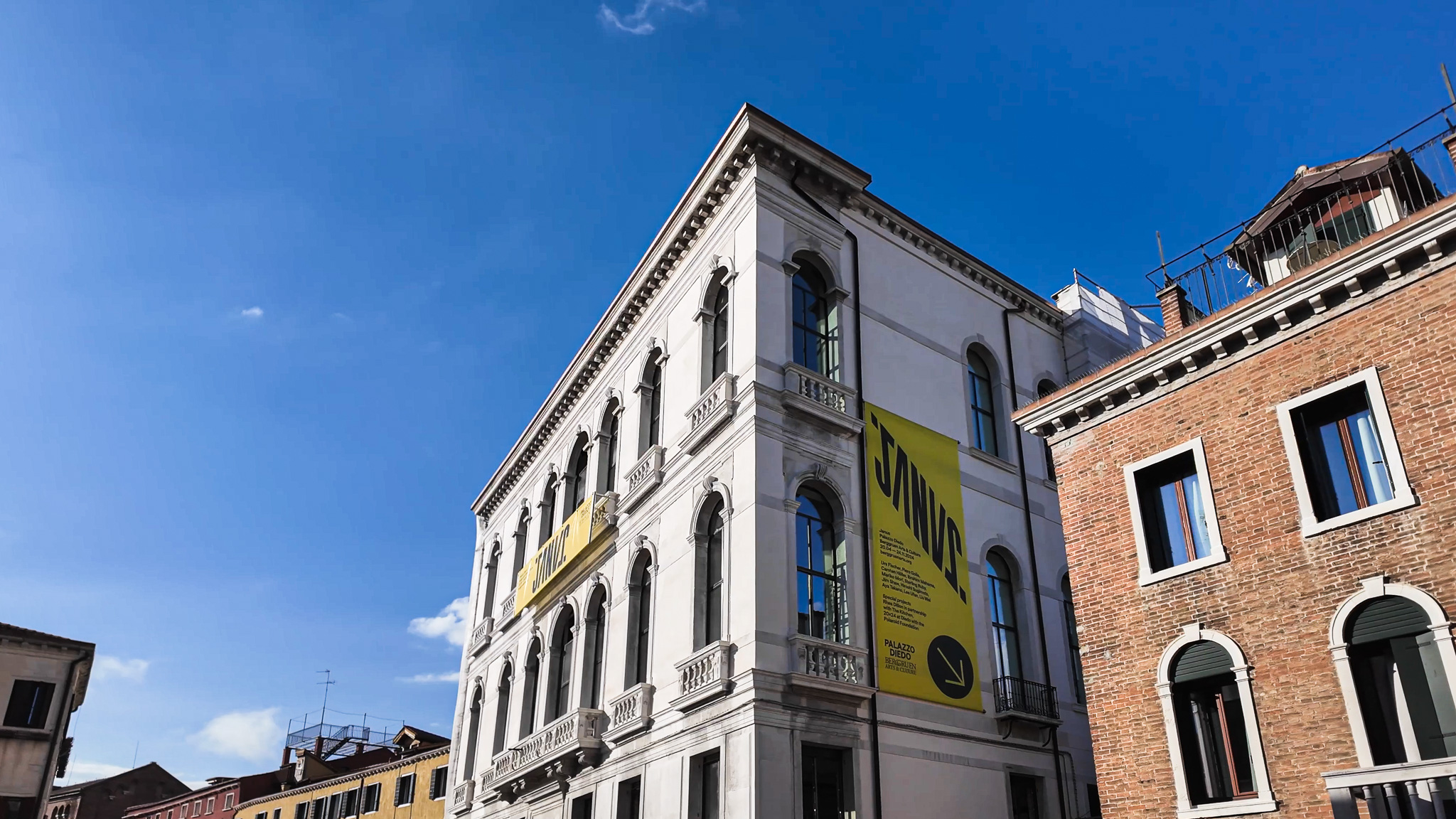
Palazzo Diedo

The entrance hall of the palazzo is designed on a cross-shaped plan with four doorways. The central section features two portals adorned with sculpted pediments and Istrian stone columns. The main floors retain the traditional Venetian tripartite layout, with a long central "portego" (hall) connecting to lateral rooms and three large openings on the facades.

The ground floor, with a height of 8 meters, includes two portals decorated with a multi-band entablature and a small central pediment with Istrian stone figures. The mezzanine levels are adorned with pastel-colored monochrome and polychrome stuccos, frames, and medallions featuring portraits.

The first noble floor is enriched with two precious allegorical-mythological fresco cycles. The western cycle, dated 1765, is attributed to Francesco Fontebasso, while the eastern side celebrates the marriage of Antonio Diedo and Lucrezia Adriana Nani in 1795, attributed to Costantino Cedini.

During recent restorations, large segments of a decorative cycle were uncovered throughout the central portego. Beneath heavy 19th-century repaintings, restorations revealed imposing figures of telamons and caryatids adorned with festoons and trompe-l’oeil, likely censored in earlier years for public decorum during the building's civic use.

The second noble floor, intended for future artist workshops, preserves six monochromatic frescoes depicting Roman capricci solely in the central hall.

The two mezzanine levels display fine 18th-century monochrome or pastel stucco decorations. These rooms alternate simple floral motifs, medallions with portraits, and mythological themes, including a bas-relief of Ceres, the goddess of harvest, on a chariot drawn by two winged dragons.

== Permanent contemporary artworks ==
During restoration, Palazzo Diedo was enriched with eleven site-specific artworks commissioned from contemporary artists who engaged directly with the architecture and interpreted Venetian artistic crafts, such as frescoes, large canvases, Murano glass, luxurious textiles, and terrazzo flooring.

Notable permanent works include:

- Carsten Höller, Scala del dubbio, 2024, metal balustrades, Vicenza stone, marmorino, metal structures
- Ibrahim Mahama, Three Little Birds, 2023, fiberglass relief mura
- Mariko Mori, Great Light, 2024, printed fabric
- Sterling Ruby, Lantern (3), 2024, sand-cast aluminium, glass
- Jim Shaw, The Alexander Romances, 2024, acrylic on muslin and wood panels with decorative wood molding
- Hiroshi Sugimoto, Enlightning, 2024, printed fabric
- Aya Takano, Happy and joyous days, 2024, fresco
- Liu Wei, Throw a Dice, 2024, fiberglass, polyethylene slab, acrylic sheet, aluminium alloy, wood, LED light box
- Lee Ufan, Response, 2024, fresco
- Urs Fischer, Good Luck Peanuts, 2024, acrylic spray on sand-based fresco and lime plaster
- Piero Golia, Untitled (floor), 2024, wood platform, unfinished Venetian terrazzo flooring, construction worker included
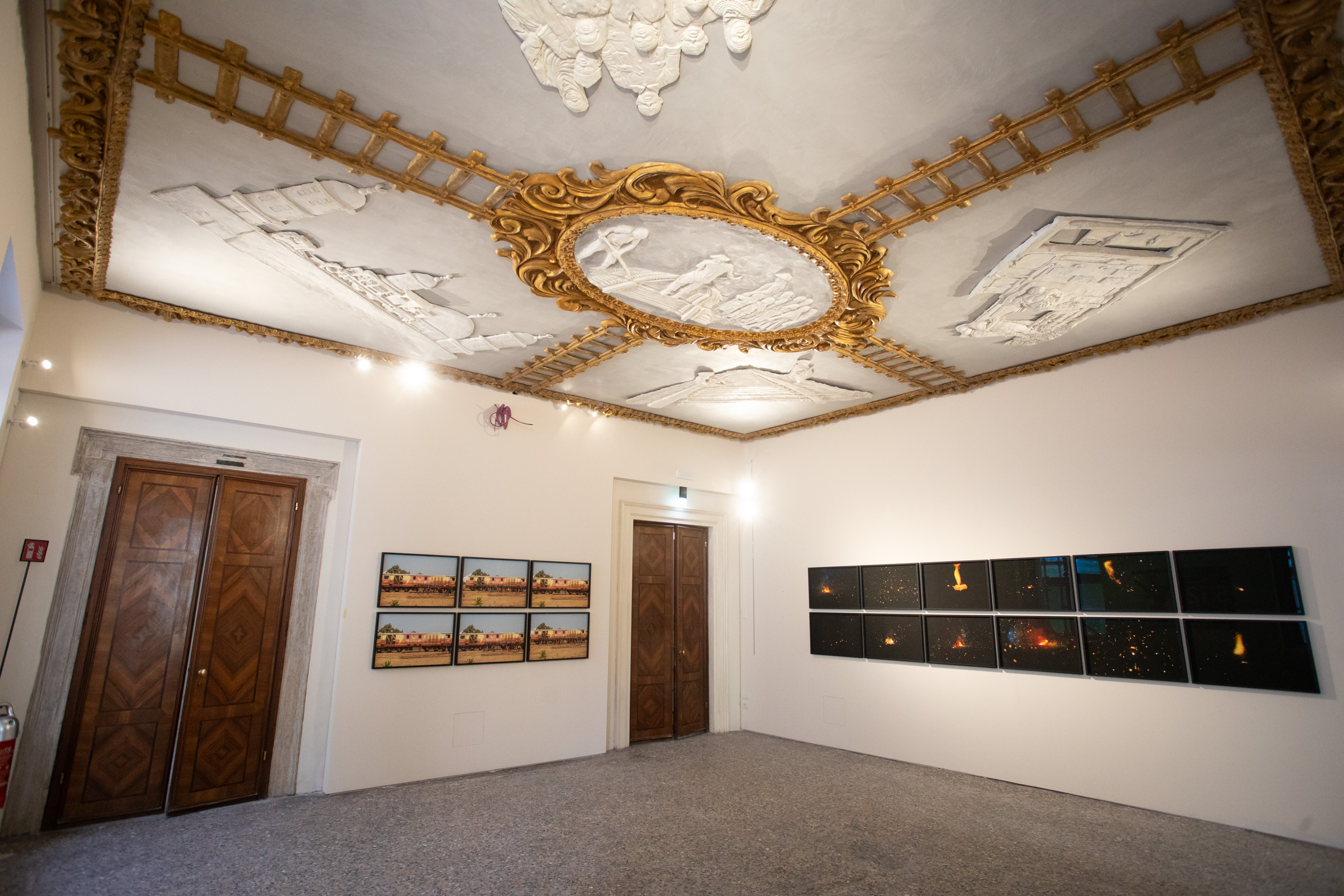
Ibrahim Mahama, Three Little Birds, 2023, fiberglass relief mural

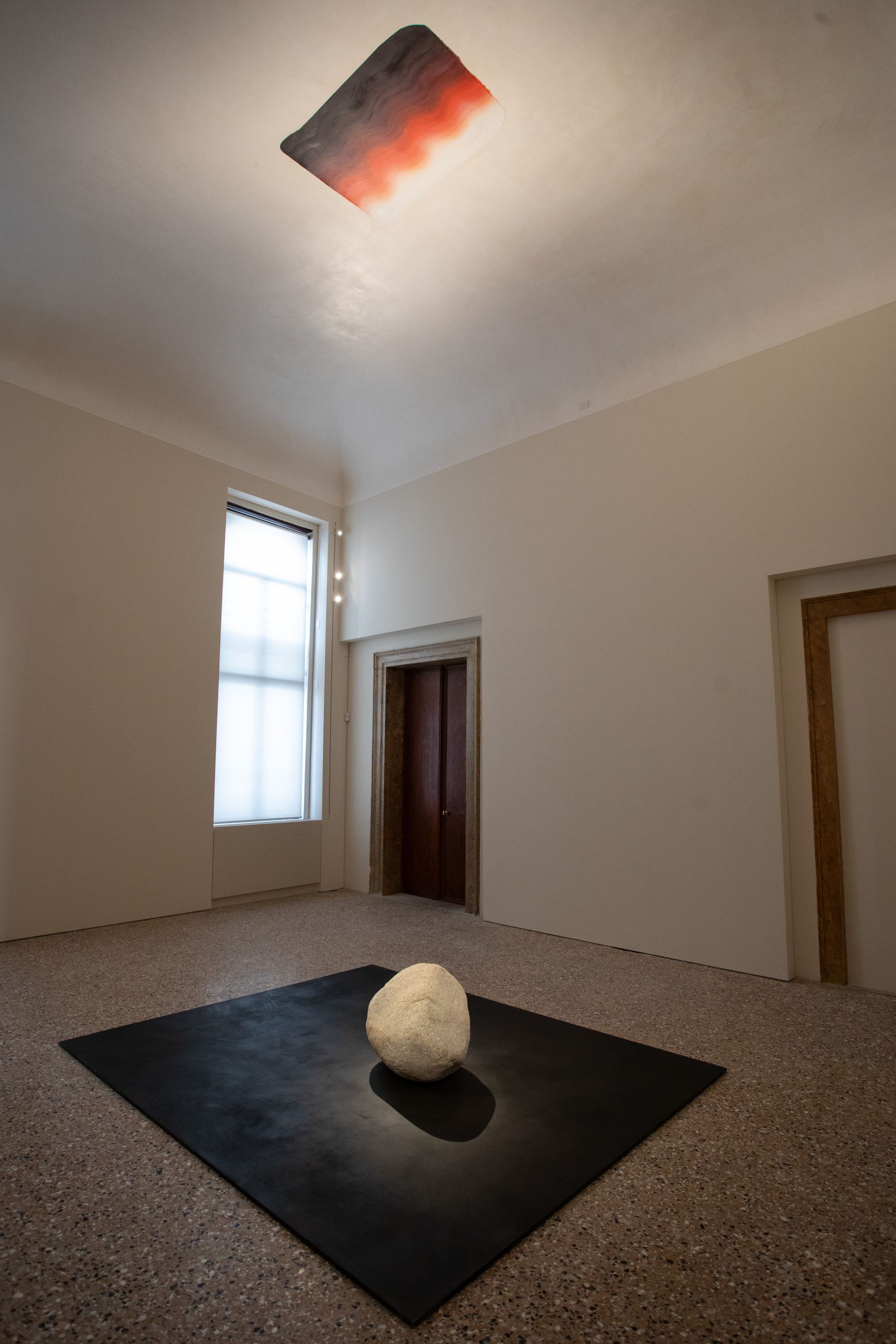
Lee Ufan, Response, 2024, fresco

== The Janus exhibition ==
On April 20, 2024, Palazzo Diedo reopened with the exhibition "Janus" curated by Mario Codognato and Adriana Rispoli. Named after Janus, the ancient Roman god of beginnings and transitions, the exhibition symbolically links history with contemporary culture, mirroring Palazzo Diedo's mission to look to the past to interpret the future.

The works in "Janus" interact with the palazzo's 18th-century architecture, inspired by traditional Venetian crafts like Murano glass, fine textiles, and fresco art.

Alongside "Janus," the interdisciplinary institution The Kitchen presented a solo exhibition by London-based artist Rhea Dillon, exploring the conceptualization of Blackness in contemporary aesthetics.

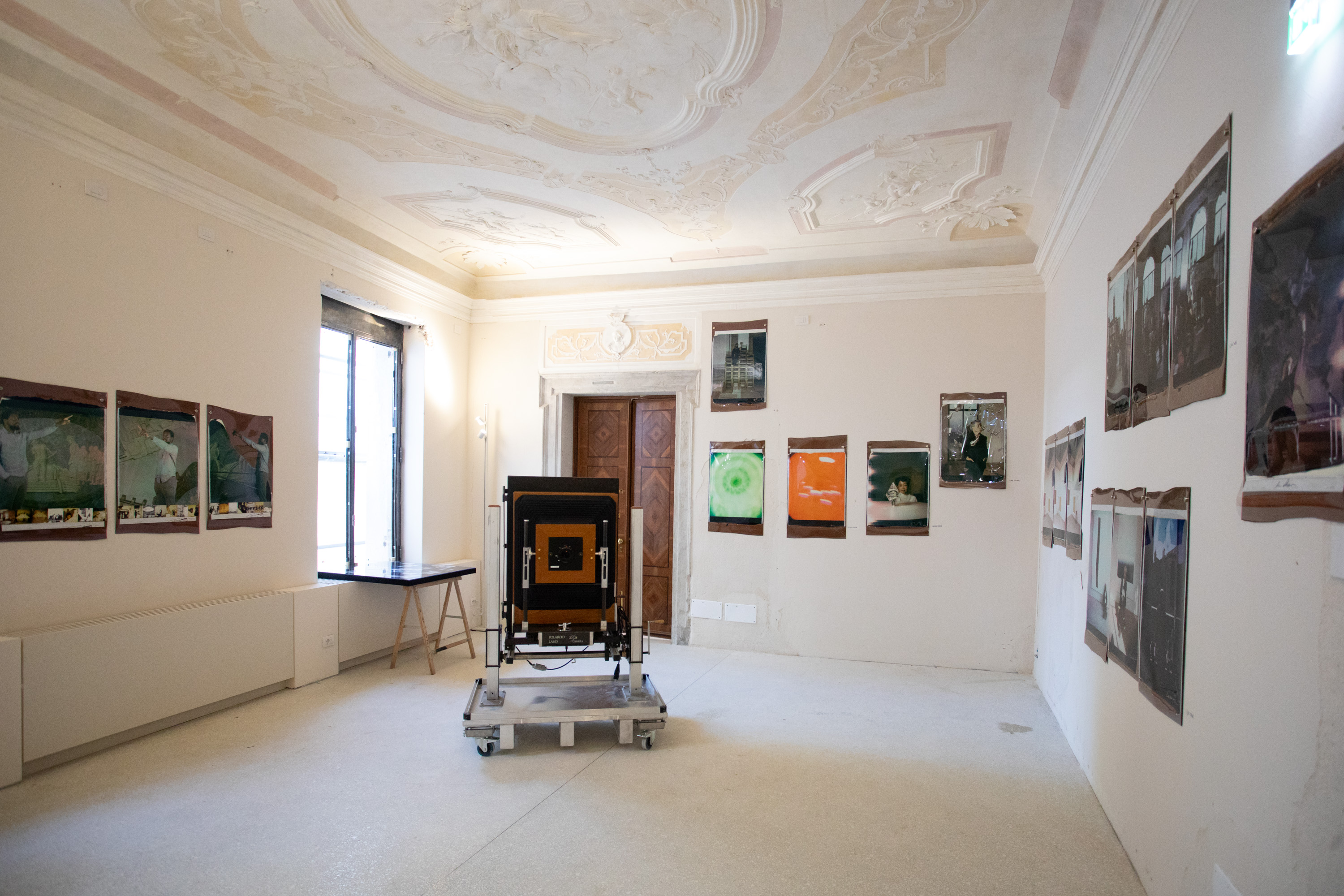

During the opening days, the Polaroid Foundation invited the participating artists to create works using the iconic Polaroid 20×24 camera. In the past, this camera has been used by artists such as Andy Warhol, Chuck Close, Jim Dine, Maria Magdalena Campos-Pons, Mary Ellen Mark, Mickalene Thomas, Robert Frank, Robert Mapplethorpe, Robert Rauschenberg, and Sally Mann. John Reuter, an expert in Polaroid photography since 1980, assisted the artists in creating large-format images (20x24 inches) for the exhibition. Palazzo Diedo also features a small cinema, showing the latest film by artist Koo Jeong A every Thursday until November 2024.
