= Savannah Centre for Contemporary Art =

Ghanaian Exhibition Company

Savannah Centre for Contemporary Art is a centre of arts initiated by Ibrahim Mahamah in Tamale, Ghana. The centre organizes artist-run projects, as well as exhibitions and research. SCCA-Tamale is affiliated with blaxTARLINES KUMASI. Its focus is on 20th-century art and cultural practices.

== Exhibitions ==
- Akutia: Blindfolding the Sun and the Poetics of Peace by Agyeman Ossei, ‘Dota’ (Co-Curators Adwoa)
- In pursuit of something beautiful, perhaps... (A retrospective) by Curator Bernard Akoi-Jackson (PhD) Location
