= Ibrahim Mahama (artist) =

Ghanaian artist and author

- Ibrahim Mahama at Red Clay Studio
- Born: 1987 (age 38–39); Tamale, Northern Region, Ghana
- Education: Kwame Nkrumah University of Science and Technology
- Occupations: Artist and Founder of Red Clay Studio, Savannah Centre for Contemporary Art and Nikromah Voli-ni
- Notable work: Parliament of Ghosts
- Honours: Ordre des Arts et des Lettres

Ibrahim Mahama (born 1987 in Tamale, Ghana) is a Ghanaian contemporary artist known for his large-scale installations, sculptures and architectural interventions that explore global trade, commodification, labor, economic inequality, migration, and the socio-political legacies of colonialism in Africa. Mahama transforms everyday materials, such as jute sacks used in commodity exchange and abandoned infrastructure, into works that engage with collective memory and historical narratives.

Mahama has exhibited internationally, including at the Venice Biennale, Kochi-Muziris Biennale and Documenta, and his work is held in public collections worldwide, including the Centre Pompidou, the Los Angeles County Museum of Art (LACMA), and the National Gallery of Art in Washington, D.C.

Mahama is the founder of the Savannah Centre for Contemporary Art (SCCA), Red Clay Studio, and Nkrumah Voli-ni in Tamale, which serve as platforms for exhibitions, research, and community-based learning. In 2025, Mahama became the first person from the African continent to top ArtReview’s Power 100, honoured both for his artistic practice and for creating infrastructures that support other artists in realising their visions. In 2025 he also received the Art Basel & UBS Artist of the Year Award and the Gold Award in the Established Artist category at the inaugural Art Basel Awards. He was awarded Chevalier de l’Ordre des Arts et des Lettres in 2026.

Ibrahim Mahama is known for his large-scale installations made from jute sacks previously used to transport cocoa beans and charcoal, which are emblematic of Ghana’s commodity dependency. His work explores themes of commodity, migration, globalization, and economic exchange. Mahama’s ambitious installations often transform urban spaces and are a commentary on labor and decay.His notable projects include "Out of Bounds" at the 2015 Venice Biennale and "A Straight Line Through the Carcass of History" which has been shown in various locations worldwide, including Athens, Kassel, and New York. These works critically examine the impact of the material history of post-colonial Ghana within the context of global commerce.

== Early life and education ==
Mahama was born in 1987 in Tamale, Ghana, the ninth of ten siblings in a polygamous family. Growing up in a large family environment influenced his ability to work collaboratively and recognize connections across different social contexts. His grandfather lived in a car repair shop in Accra, while his father, a civil engineer and road contractor in Tamale, inspired his early fascination with industrial materials and labor systems. From a young age, he enjoyed drawing and found a sense of peace through creative expression. He attended boarding school from the age of five to twelve, followed by two years at a Catholic school before transferring to a boarding school for his secondary education. In high school, he chose to specialize in visual arts, encouraged and supported by his father.

He went on to study fine art at Kwame Nkrumah University of Science and Technology (KNUST) in Kumasi, where he specialized in painting and sculpture, earning a Bachelor of Fine Arts in Painting in 2010, a Master of Fine Arts in Painting and Sculpture in 2013, and a PhD in fine art in 2015.

During his time at the university, Mahama became increasingly interested in how materials carry memory, particularly found objects such as jute sacks, wood, and metal that reflect the movement of goods, labor, and histories across borders. His early installations, often composed of stitched-together jute sacks, were shown at the local market in Accra. He has described his time at university; "For us it was more about producing work that would somehow change the relationship between art and the market – and create new forms of the market in the future." His works were also exhibited on the university building and the railway station, marking the beginning of his conceptual approach to art as a tool for critical engagement, civic dialogue, and architectural intervention.

Mahama credits art educator Kąrî'kạchä Seid'ou from Kwame Nkrumah University of Science and Technology and the pedagogy of blaxTARLINES KUMASI with shaping his understanding of art as a transformative social tool. Seid'ou's notion of art as a "gift to society" remains central to Mahama's philosophy of art-making and institution-building. He is today a member of blaxTARLINES KUMASI.

== Artistic practice ==
Mahama describes his artistic practice as a form of "time travel", using discarded materials such as jute sacks, train parts, shoe-shine boxes, sewing machines, school desks and bureaucratic records to reimagine narratives of postcolonial identity, economic failure, and social transformation. He has said that "art reflects a collective history. It is a response to histories and specific spaces, such as buildings. That an abandoned project from an earlier century can inspire creativity in the current century, presents a hugely effective potential for the future."

Central to his work is "trying to find out what art is" and the deconstruction of historical contexts marked by crisis or collapse, through which he excavates the generative and transformative possibilities that emerge from such moments. He has said "I use crisis and failure as the primary material in my work to be able to produce and develop new language and aesthetics." His large-scale installations, created in collaboration with artisans, technicians, traders, and local communities, engage themes of labor, migration, globalization, economic exchange, and resilience.

Documentation through photography, sound, oral histories, and archives plays a vital role in preserving and activating the social and material histories embedded in his practice. Mahama often incorporates architecture as a conceptual and material element, describing his approach as "We never really think about how a building is constructed, the labor that goes into it, and where the capital comes from. So this is where my work comes in. I use architecture as a tool to reorganize our thinking."

Education, research, and cultural infrastructure are central to Mahama's expanded practice. Through his institutions in Kumasi and Tamale; the Savannah Centre for Contemporary Art (SCCA), Red Clay Studio, and Nkrumah Volini, he supports experimental pedagogy, local knowledge production, and intergenerational learning. These spaces serve as schools, studios, libraries, archives, and exhibition venues. With the hope that the access will allow schoolchildren to realise "the transformative quality of art." They enable new ways of thinking about art's role in society and offer models for building cultural ecosystems from within. He has said "It's very important not to leave Ghana. You want to feel 30 years from now that you were part of the struggle, that you have helped to build this country."

In 2024, Mahama was the subject of the short documentary Dear Home of Scars, directed by Marina Meijer as part of the Ammodo Docs series, which documents aspects of his artistic practice in Ghana.

Mahama has participated in several artist residencies, including the DAAD Berliner Künstlerprogramm in Berlin and Occupy Atopos in Athens (2017–2018), Gasworks in London (2013), Atelierhaus Hilmsen in Germany (2012), and multiple residencies at OFKOB (Occupy Farmstead Kokobeng) in Ofoase Kokobeng, Ghana (2013, 2014, 2015), a self-initiated project space focused on community, agriculture, and experimental art practice. Mahama also lectures widely at institutions such as Pratt Institute, contributing to global conversations on contemporary African art, decolonial theory, and socially engaged practice.

Mahama has referenced Robert Rauschenberg's approach to assemblage, Robert Smithson's engagement with landscape and peripheral spaces, along the Arte Povera movement and African contemporaries such as Romuald Hazoumé and El Anatsui, known for their innovative use of found materials to address cultural and historical themes, as inspiration.

Mahama's work takes inspiration from postcolonial literature and music, including Karl Marx's Das Kapital (1867), Walter Benjamin's essay The Author as Producer (1934), Chinua Achebe's No Longer at Ease (1960), Chimamanda Ngozi Adichie's Half of a Yellow Sun (2006), and Maurizio Lazzarato's The Making of the Indebted Man (2012), as well as the music of Fela Kuti. Several of his artworks and exhibitions take their titles from African literature, including; A Spell of Good Things (2024, White Cube New York) references the novel by Nigerian writer Ayọ̀bámi Adébáyọ̀, Fragments (2017, White Cube London) draws from the novel by Ghanaian author Ayi Kwei Armah, while Purple Hibiscus (2023–24, Barbican Centre, London) and Half of a Yellow Sun (2022, White Cube Hong Kong) is titled after Chimamanda Ngozi Adichie's novels.

During the COVID-19 pandemic, Mahama contributed to Designboom's "Messages of Hope" series with cultural figures. He shared images from Red Clay studio in Tamale, accompanied by the reflection: "The promises of the present can start with ghosts from both the future and past. Ghosts are an embodiment of failed revolutions and unrealized futures, which need to be used as a starting point for new conversations within this century and beyond. Every life form is a gift."

== Career ==
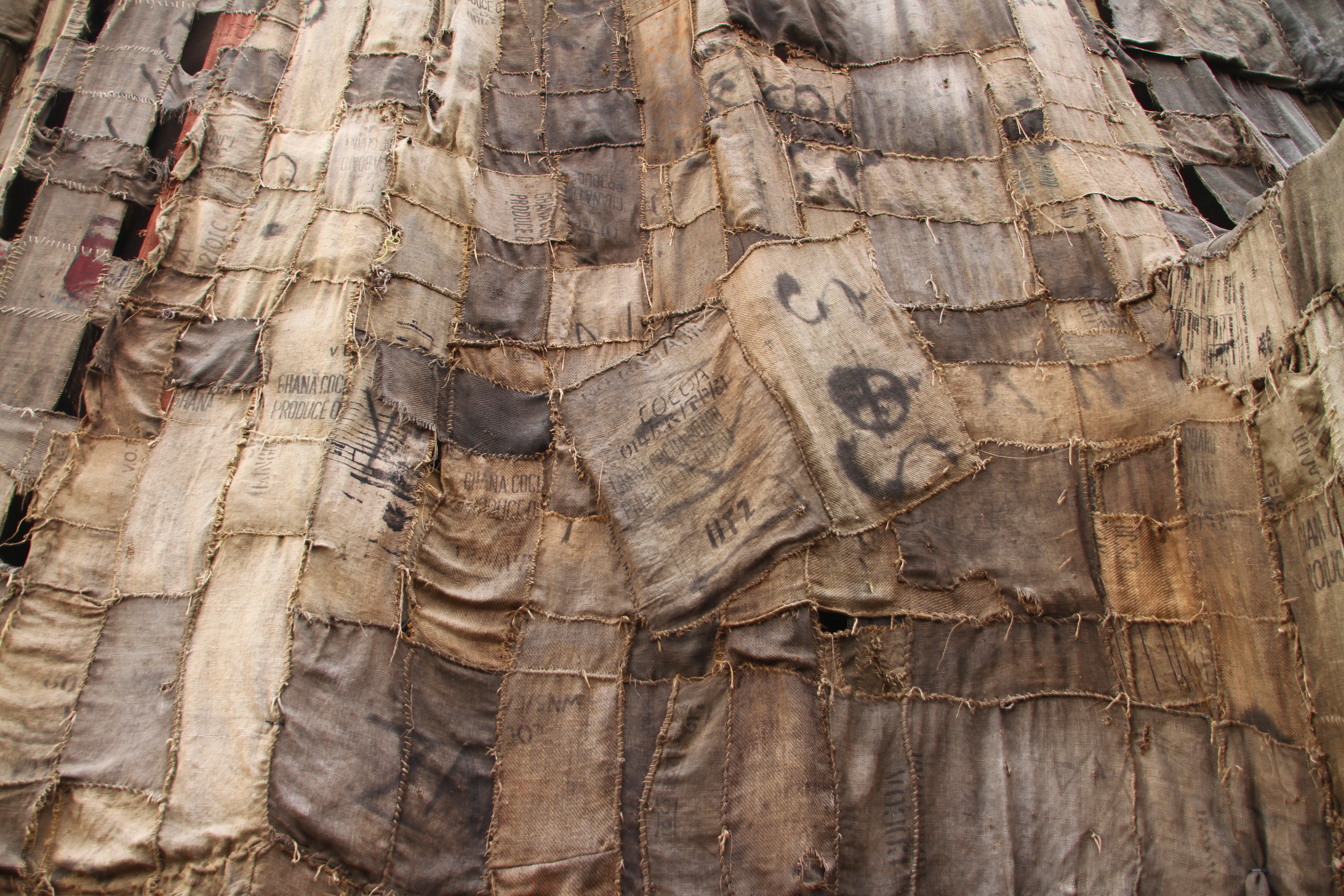
Documenta 14, Kassel, 2017

A Friend, Porta Venezia, Milan, Italy, 2019

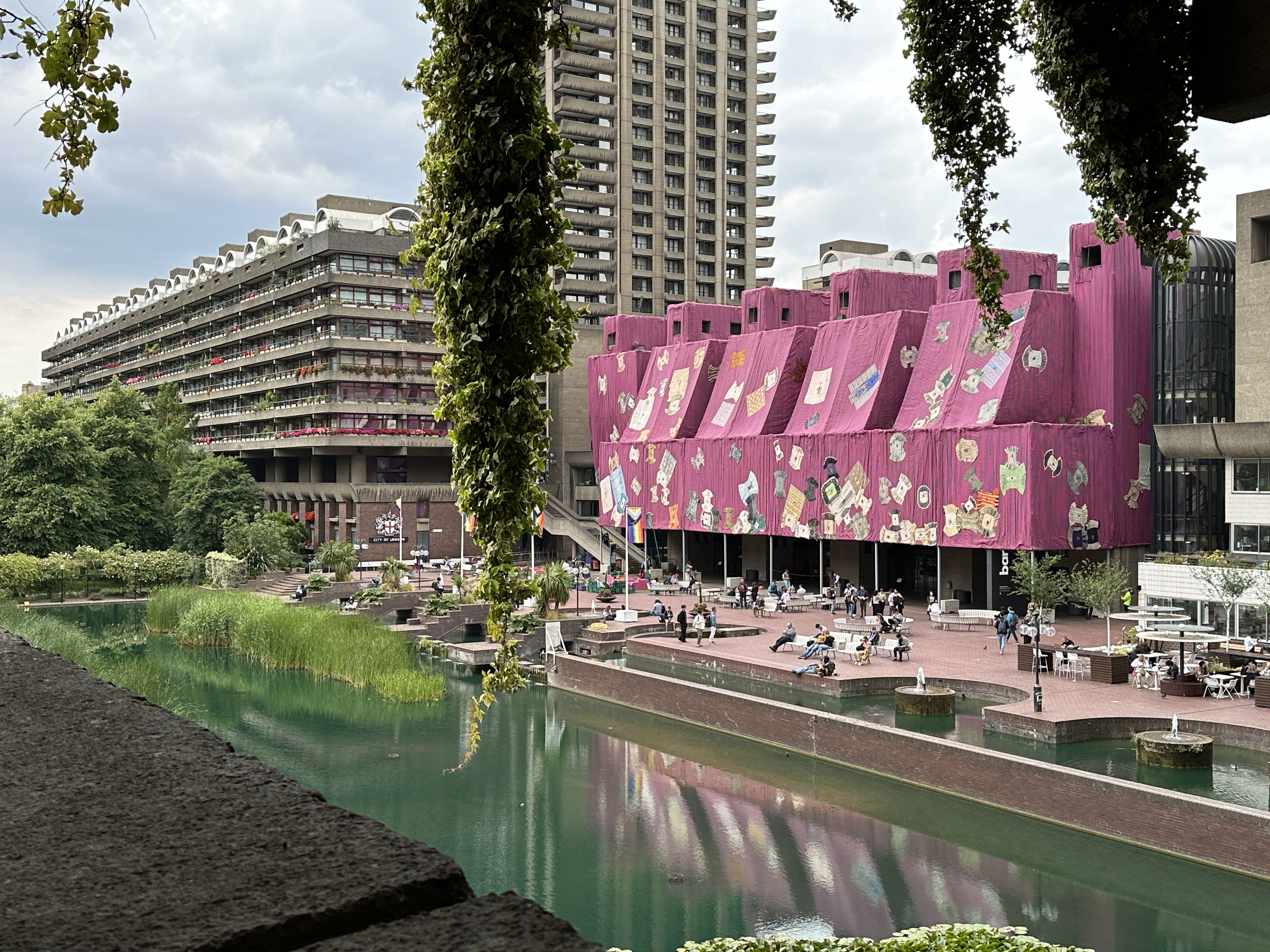
Purple Hibiscus, Barbican Centre, London, United Kingdom, 2024

The God of Small Things, Art Basel, Switzerland, 2026

Ibrahim Mahama rose to international prominence through large-scale, site-specific interventions using stitched-together jute sacks. Stamped with the Product of Ghana, the jute sacks were originally used to transport the country's top export cocoa, charcoal, and other goods, bearing the marks of trade, labor, and global circulation. Through a process of exchange, Mahama acquired the sacks from markets and workers, embedding in them a layered social memory of use, value, and negotiation. In Mahama's work, the sacks are transformed through community-based processes of stitching them together into monumental tapestries that drape buildings and public structures.

Mahama has covered significant sites with his jute sack tapestries, referred to as Occupations, including Class and Identity at Kwame Nkrumah University of Science and Technology (KNUST) in Kumasi (2010); Kumasi Railway Station and KUNST Museum (2013); sites in Accra (2013); the Corderie and Arsenale in Venice for Out of Bounds (2014–2015) during the 56th Venice Biennale; the National Theatre of Ghana in Malam Dodoo National Theatre (2016); Kunsthal Charlottenborg in Copenhagen with Nyhavn's Kpalang (2016); the Former Food Distribution Corporation in Accra with Exchange-Exchanger (2016); the atrium of the Tel Aviv Museum of Art with Fracture (2016); the Norval Foundation in Cape Town with Labour of Many (2019); and London's Barbican Centre with Purple Hibiscus (2024). His tapestries have also featured as centrepieces in markets in Accra, Kawokudi in Accra, Documenta 14 in Kassel, Germany (2017), and the Saatchi Gallery in London in 2014 and 2015.

At the 56th Venice Biennale in 2015, Mahama gained international recognition with his large-scale installation Out of Bounds, in which he wrapped two prominent walls of the Arsenale with stitched jute sacks. The sacks, commonly used to transport cocoa beans, one of Ghana's biggest exports,, were printed with names of different traders, documenting the multiple hands that the items had passed through before Mahama used them for this work. The work "explored how labour and exchange are intertwined with the postcolonial condition in the artist’s home country of Ghana." Curated by Okwui Enwezor, the installation marked a turning point in Mahama's career, attracting significant critical attention. It was during the Biennale that Mahama met Susan May, artistic director at White Cube, which began representing him shortly thereafter. Frieze named the work No.22 of "The 25 Best Works of the 21st Century".

At Documenta 14, held in Athens and Kassel in 2017, Mahama presented two major site-specific installations that engaged public architecture through material and memory:

- Check Point Prosfygika (Athens, Syntagma Square and Prosfygika housing complex) involved sewing hundreds of discarded charcoal sacks imported, worn, and stamped with trade markings into expansive textile surfaces that covered public plazas. The collaborative performance, involving migrants and local residents, emphasized their labor and communal histories while addressing global trade networks and economic precarity.
- Check Point Sekondi Loco. 1901–2030 (Kassel, Torwache) featured the wrapping of Kassel's historic gatehouse in jute sacks, scrap metal, tarpaulins, metal tags, and leather from a Henschel locomotive. The work interrogated the politics of infrastructural spaces and transformed the site into a critical commentary on capitalist circulation and colonial-era trade commodities.

In 2019, as part of Frieze Sculpture in New York, Mahama unveiled his first large-scale public installation in the city by replacing 50 of the 192 UN flags at Rockefeller Center with hand-stitched jute flags made in Ghana.

In 2019, Mahama represented Ghana in its first-ever national pavilion at the Venice Biennale titled Ghana Freedom. He was the youngest artist featured. His installation, A Straight Line Through the Carcass of History 1649, curated by Nana Oforiatta Ayim and designed by architect David Adjaye, used colonial-era railway components, wooden grills, and other salvaged materials to explore Ghana's post-independence history. The work questioned narratives of liberation and progress, presenting decaying industrial infrastructure as a metaphor for unrealized political and social transformation.

Also in 2019, Mahama presented Parliament of Ghosts at the Manchester International Festival. Constructed from 120 second-hand train seats arranged to resemble Ghana's Parliament, along with abandoned railway parts, train carriages, and colonial-era station furniture, the installation formed a civic space reflecting on the ambitions and failures of Ghana's post-independence era. He said at the time: "Everything here bears the residue of history. My interest comes from the workers who made these seats and the people who used these trains to get to work. Their labour haunts the seats." The work has since been permanently installed at Mahama's Red Clay campus in Tamale, where it functions as a cultural assembly hall, a site for public discourse, and a platform for education and research.

In 2023, Mahama was appointed artistic director of the 35th Ljubljana Biennale of Graphic Arts, becoming the first African artist to lead the historic Slovenian exhibition. Under the theme From the Void Came Gifts of the Cosmos, Mahama collaborated with Exit Frame Collective, Alicia Knock, Selom Koffi Kudjie, Inga Lāce, Beya Othmani, and Patrick Nii Okanta to explore anti-colonial and anti-imperial struggles through the medium of printmaking. The project drew inspiration from Ghana's post-independence infrastructure and sought to revive historical connections between Ghana and Slovenia. The biennale featured new commissions and existing works by artists and collectives including Otobong Nkanga, Mireille Kaboré, and the Kuhle Collective.

In 2024, Mahama held his first solo exhibition in New York, A Spell of Good Things, at White Cube. Together with Songs about Roses at Fruitmarket in Edinburgh, it explored Ghana’s colonial and industrial history through salvaged materials, drawings and installations. Other exhibitions included If These Are the Things at APALAZZOGALLERY in Brescia and Rubber Soul at the Mönchehaus Museum Goslar in Germany. Mahama also created Purple Hibiscus for the Barbican Centre in London as part of Unravel: The Power & Politics of Textiles in Art. The installation covered the building’s lakeside façade with approximately 2,000 square metres of pink and purple cloth, woven and sewn in collaboration with craftspeople in Tamale. Around 100 traditional Ghanaian robes, known as batakaris, were incorporated into the fabric. Named after Chimamanda Ngozi Adichie’s novel, the work explored the transmission of memory and knowledge through textiles.

In 2025, Mahama presented Parliament of Ghosts at Ibraaz in London, using reclaimed railway timber and chairs collected from Ghanaian households to create a space for public gathering. At Kunsthalle Wien in Vienna, Zilijifa examined Ghana’s railway history and the physical demands of labour through an installation combining a diesel locomotive with used metal carrying basins. He also covered the façades of Kunsthalle Bern and the Museum of Contemporary Art in Skopje, North Macedonia, with jute-sack installations addressing histories of trade, labour and colonialism.

In 2026, Mahama presented Digging Stars in Singapore as part of The Pierre Lorinet Collection and A Shea Garden at Galleria Barovier&Toso in Venice, where Ghanaian terracotta vessels were shown alongside reinterpretations in Murano glass. His public commissions included The God of Small Things on Münsterplatz for Art Basel and Labyrinths at MAPS Museum in Køge, an installation constructed from bricks reclaimed from historic Danish buildings.

Marking Mahama’s largest exhibition in France to date, The Harvest Season transformed the Fondation Cartier pour l’art contemporain into a collective, living learning environment that echoeed the cultural and artistic hubs Mahama has established in Tamale, northern Ghana (such as Red Clay and the Savannah Centre for Contemporary Art). The title The Harvest Season serves as a metaphor for a cycle of creation, representing the sowing of ideas, the transmission of knowledge and expertise across generations, and the collaborative harvesting of shared intellectual engagement. Curated by Aby Gaye-Duparc and Jeanne Barral, as an intergenerational dialogue, the exhibition explored Ghana’s colonial and postcolonial heritage, industrial history, and the political, cultural, and social utopias that emerged around the era of African independence in the 1950s and 1960s.

Mahama presented his own site-specific installations, archival works, and polaroid collages alongside contributions from a diverse group of invited international artists, architects, and collectives. Mahama’s signature installation, Parliament of Ghosts, reimagined with traditional Ashanti wooden stools configured to resemble a parliamentary assembly, designed to serve as a communal space for dialogue, public talks (The Parliament Sessions), and cultural events throughout the run of the exhibition. The new installation With Things Fall Apart, reimagined material remnants from an abandoned 1966 glass bottle factory in Ghana originally built during the era of Kwame Nkrumah. Large-scale textile installations spanned the arcades and exterior architecture of the Fondation Cartier building, acting as a "second skin."

Dorothy Akpene Amenuke (born 1968, Ghanaian) exhibited textile and monumental jute installations exploring material memory and artisanal gestures. Gideon Appah (born 1987, Ghanaian) exhibited paintings drawing on West African visual archives from the 1950s to the 1980s. James Barnor (born 1929, Ghanaian) exhibited archival prints and photographic legacies documenting the period following Ghana's independence, including recent collaborative Polaroid works. Cercle d’Art des Travailleurs de Plantation Congolaise (CATPC) (founded 2014, Congolese cooperative based in the Democratic Republic of the Congo) exhibited sculptures and drawings addressing histories of plantation labor and postcolonial critique. Courage Dzidula Kpodo (born 1999, Ghanaian) exhibited architectural and spatial installations exploring plantation and colonial histories. Postbox Ghana (founded 2021 by Manuela Nebuloni) presented archival research and spatial installations unpacking historical Ghanaian postcards and architecture. Zohra Opoku (born 1976, German-Ghanaian) exhibited textile-based works and screen-printed vintage linens investigating identity and heritage. Tjaša Rener (born 1986, born in the former Yugoslavia, based in Ghana) contributed multimedia and visual works engaging with themes of migration, memory, and environment. Feda Wardak (born 1991, Franco-Afghan) contributed architectural and spatial interventions that explore the transformation of urban landscapes and material histories.

Mahama is represented by White Cube and APALAZZOGALLERY.

== Institutional work in Tamale ==
Using proceeds from his first major international exhibition at Saatchi Gallery in London, Mahama purchased a 40,000-square-meter plot of land near Tamale, Ghana, to address the lack of formal arts education in the region. Since 2014, he has developed three major institutions, transforming it into a cultural campus that integrates art, education, and community development. The campus welcomes more than 100,000 visitors a year, and functions as an ongoing and evolving cultural project that reflects Mahama's artistic practice and commitment to sustainable growth. Proceeds generated through this model are continually reinvested into the campus's long-term development.

Curator Azu Nwagbogu wrote in ArtReview that Mahama "seeks to leverage his position and renown to help remediate present conditions in Ghana by building infrastructure in order to enable long-term collaborations between citizens and institutions; between artists, curators and cultural producers across the continent and in diaspora through institution-building towards a fundamentally engaged and integrated methodology of art practice for the benefit of society at large."

=== Savannah Centre for Contemporary Art (SCCA Tamale) ===
Opened in March 2019, SCCA Tamale is a 900-square-metre multidisciplinary art space and research hub dedicated to contemporary African and diasporic art. Under the leadership of Artistic Director Selom Kudjle, it functions as both a 15-room residency and exhibition venue, fostering critical engagement and public dialogue.

Notable exhibitions include:

- Galle Winston Kofi Dawson: In Pursuit of Something 'Beautiful', Perhaps…, March 15 – 15 August 2019 The inaugural exhibition at SCCA Tamale was a retrospective celebrating Ghanaian modernist Galle Winston Kofi Dawson's multifaceted body of work, curated by Bernard Akoi-Jackson.
- Akutia: Blindfolding the Sun and the Poetics of Peace, 4 September 2020 – 7 March 2021 A retrospective of Ghanaian artist Agyeman Ossei (Dota), showcasing works inspired by Asante culture, philosophy, and folk music, presented in collaboration with Red Clay.
- A Diagnosis of Time: Unlearn What You Have Learned, April 30 – 3 November 2021 A collaborative exhibition with ARoS Aarhus Art Museum and the Ghana Museums and Monuments Board, examining the concept of time through diverse media including paintings, sculptures, and cultural objects.
- Existing Otherwise: The Future of Coexistence, January 14 – 30 April 2022 A hybrid curatorial project featuring artists such as Zanele Muholi, Ato Jackson, and Selom Kudjie, exploring alternative narratives and coexistence in post-pandemic societies.
- Dig Where You Stand, September 2 – 9 October 2022 Curated by Azu Nwagbogu and presented by the African Artists' Foundation, this exhibition investigated regenerative artistic practices and their potential to challenge extractive economic systems.

=== Red Clay Studio ===
Ibrahim Mahama at Red Clay Studio

Red Clay Studio, Tamale, Ghana

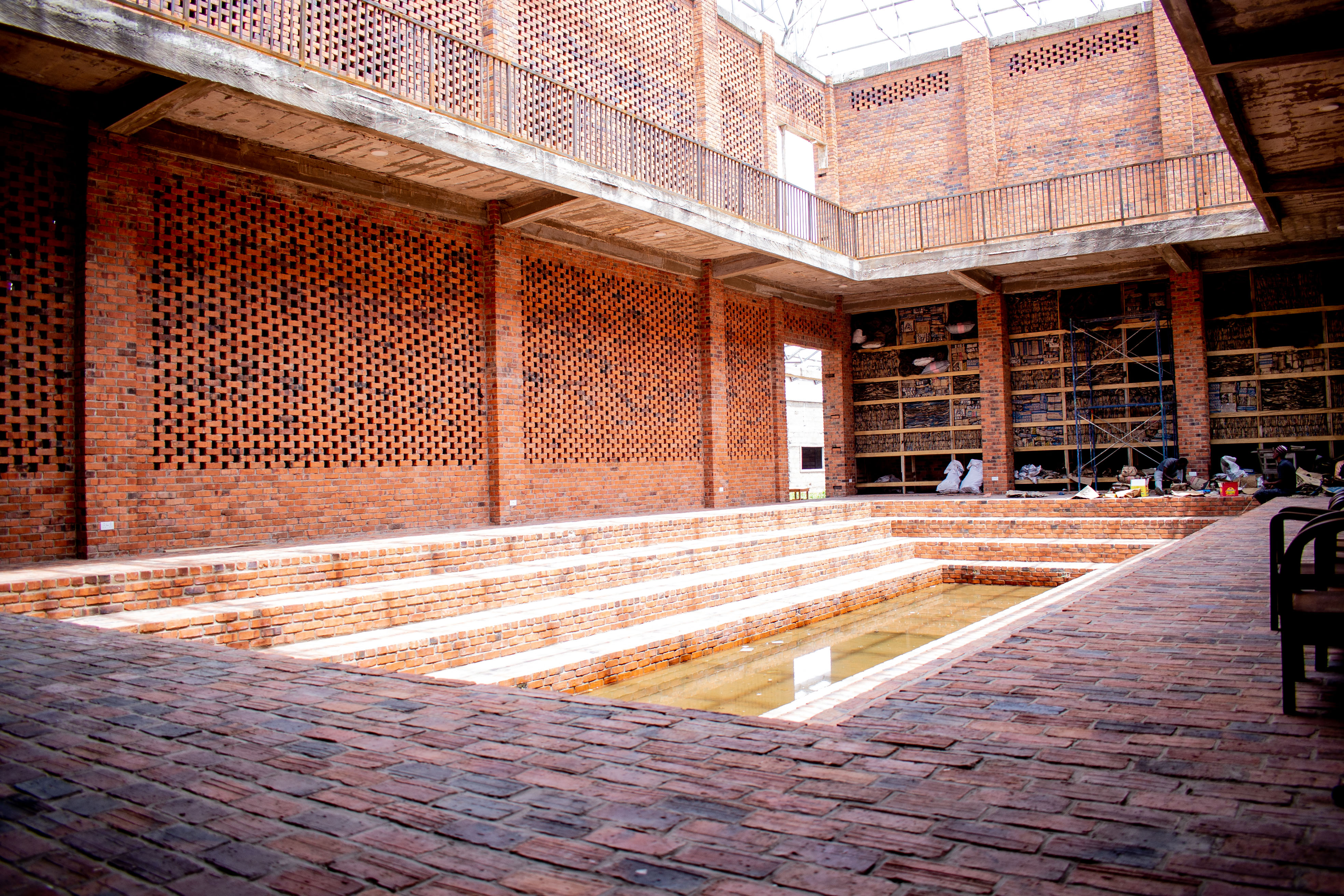
Parliament of Ghosts, Red Clay Studio, Ghana

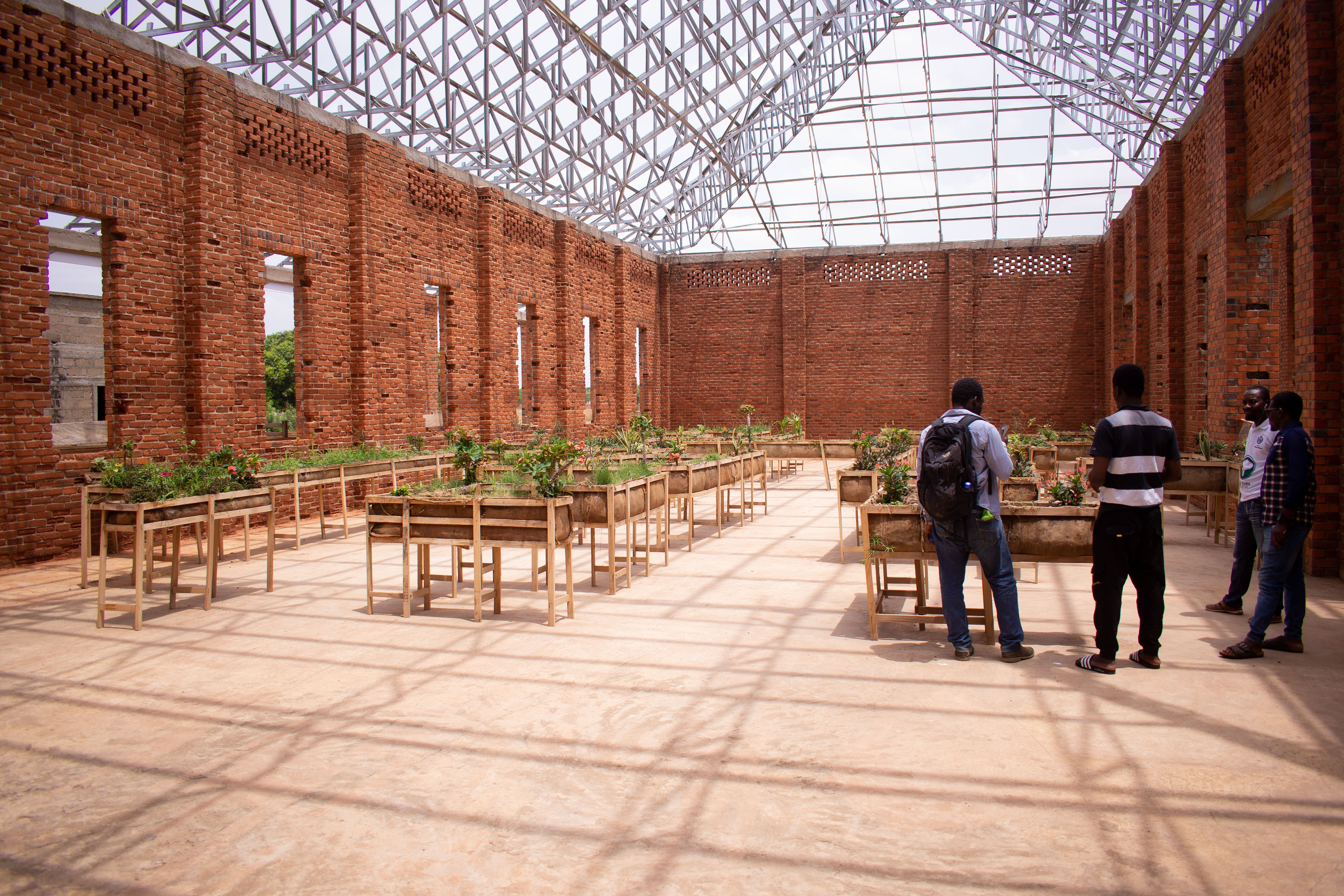
Red Clay Studio, Tamale, Ghana

Airplane, Red Clay Studio, Ghana

Red Clay Studio is an art and cultural institution founded in 2020 in Janna Kpeŋŋ, near Tamale, Ghana. It serves as Mahama's studio and as a hybrid learning space built from locally sourced red clay bricks. The site's artistic director is Esinam Damalie.

Red Clay Studio includes warehouses, exhibition halls, outdoor gathering spaces, and repurposed structures such as grounded British colonial-era train carriages and six Soviet-era aircraft converted into libraries, cinema rooms, and classrooms for local children. Notably, a Star Bow aircraft was transported from Accra to Tamale in December 2019, crossing the Volta River, and now serves as an educational space on site.

A key permanent installation is Parliament of Ghosts, originally shown in Manchester in 2019 and now reinstalled at Red Clay Studio. This chamber-like structure reimagines political power and colonial architecture, inviting reflection and dialogue.

With 2000 school children visiting a week, Red Clay Studio's programming includes free educational workshops in robotics, solar energy, drone piloting, coding, and interdisciplinary creative activities. The institution's mission reflects Mahama's commitment to ensuring that access to culture, critical thinking, and technical skills is not limited by geography.

==== Fire Outbreak ====
On February 18th, 2026, repairs on a vintage train in Ibrahim Mahama's Red Clay Studio resulted in a fire. The train, which had been acquired two years before the incident, was engulfed by the fire, destroying one of the most difficult pieces acquired by the artist.

=== Nkrumah Voli-ni ===
Nkrumah Voli-ni is an educational and cultural space founded in 2022. The artistic director is Ernest Sarkitey. It was named after an abandoned grain silo complex in Tamale, Ghana. The name connects directly to Kwame Nkrumah, Ghana's first president and a key figure in the country's independence movement.

The silos date back to the Nkrumah era (1957–1966) and were part of ambitious state-driven industrial and agricultural modernization projects. They were built to store and distribute grain to support national food security and rural development, symbolizing Nkrumah's vision of economic self-reliance and collective infrastructure for the newly independent nation. Over time, many of these silos fell into disuse and decay. By transforming this abandoned site into an educational and artistic space, Mahama preserves a piece of local industrial history but also critiques the unrealized promises and failures of modernist development projects, turning a monument of past ambition into a platform for future learning, creativity, and community dialogue.

During the restoration of the silo, Mahama discovered a large colony of bats living in the rafters. Rather than displace them, he chose to preserve their habitat, integrating them as co-inhabitants of the space. This gesture informed several works, including his 2021 exhibition Lazarus at White Cube, where suspended sculptures resembling bats were crafted from oil-drenched tarpaulin and steel rebar. In his 2020–2021 exhibition As the void, vali and voli at APALAZZOGALLERY, Mahama incorporated images of bats into large-scale works that layered archival receipts, photographs, and architectural motifs from Ghana. Works such as Siiko and Leno used the bat as both ecological and symbolic figure, evoking themes of resilience, care, and shared habitation across species and histories.

== Solo exhibitions and installations ==
2026

- The Harvest Season, Foundation Cartier, Paris
- The God of Small Things, Art Basel, Basel
- Labyrinths, MAPS Museum, Køge
- A Shea Garden, Galleria Barovier&Tose, Venice
- Digging Stars, Pierre Lorinet Collection, Singapore

2025

- Zilijifa, Kunsthalle Wien, Vienna
- Ibrahim Mahama, Kunsthalle Bern, Bern
- Parliament of Ghosts, Ibraaz, London
- Ibrahim Mahama, Museum of Contemporary Art, Skopje

2024

- A Spell of Good Things, White Cube, New York
- Songs About Roses, Fruitmarket Gallery, Edinburgh
- Rubber Soul, Mönchehaus Museum Goslar, Germany
- IF THESE ARE THE THINGS, APALAZZOGALLERY, Brescia, Italy
- Purple Hibiscus, Barbican Centre, London

2023

- TRANSFER(S), Kunsthalle Osnabrück, Germany

2022

- Garden of Scars, Oude Kerk, Amsterdam, Netherlands
- VOLI-NI, Eataly Art House (E.ART.H), Verona, Italy
- The Memory of Love, FRAC des Pays de la Loire, Nantes, France
- The Memory of Love, MASSIMODECARLO Pièce Unique, Paris, France
- Half of a Yellow Sun, White Cube, Hong Kong

2021

- Lazarus, White Cube Bermondsey, London, UK
- As the Void, Vali and Voli, APALAZZOGALLERY, Brescia, Italy
- VANISHING POINTS. 2014–2020, Reiter Galleries, Leipzig, Germany
- 57 Forms of Liberty, The High Line, New York, USA
- Leaves of Grass. 2012–2021, Fisk University, Little Theater, Nashville, TN, USA

2020

- In-Between the World and Dreams, University of Michigan Museum of Art, USA
- LETTERS FROM THE VOID, White Cube Online

2019

- Living Grains, Fondazione Giuliani, Rome, Italy
- Parliament of Ghosts, The Whitworth, University of Manchester, UK
- Labour of Many, Norval Foundation, Steenberg, Cape Town, South Africa
- A Friend, Fondazione Nicola Trussardi, Caselli Daziari, Porta Venezia – Piazza Guglielmo Oberdan, Milan, Italy

2018

- 0.10 Reloaded, Avantgarde 2018, Galerie Sabine Knust, Munich, Germany
- Kunst & Kohle: Coal Market, Schloss Strünkede, Emschertal-Museum Herne, Stadtische Galerie, Germany
- A Straight Line Through the Carcass of History, 1918–1945, daadgalerie, Berlin, Germany
- Dal-Baħar Madwarha: A Straight Line Through the Carcass of History, Pixkerija, Valletta, Malta
- In Dependence, APALAZZOGALLERY, Brescia, Italy
- On Monumental Silences, Extra City Kunsthal, Antwerp, Belgium

2017

- Non-Orientable Nkansa, Miami Design District, Miami, USA
- Fragments, White Cube, Bermondsey, London, UK

2016

- Fracture, Tel Aviv Museum of Art, Tel Aviv, Israel
- Food Distribution Corporation, Artist's Rooms at K21 Ständehaus, Düsseldorf, Germany

2015

- APALAZZOGALLERY (with Edson Chagas), Brescia, Italy

2014

- Ellis King Gallery, Dublin, Ireland

2013

- Kawokudi, Accra, Ghana
- Nima, Accra, Ghana
- Adum, Railway Station, Kumasi, Ghana
- Jute, What Is Art?, K.N.U.S.T Museum, Kumasi, Ghana
- Cannon Wax, Jamestown, Accra, Ghana

2012

- Sisala Coal Market, Newtown, Accra, Ghana
- Trading Identities, MFA Block, Kumasi, Ghana

2011

- The Colonized Body, Kokomlemle, Accra, Ghana

2010

- Class and Identity, K.N.U.S.T, Kumasi, Ghana

2009

- Purity? Cultures of Display, Bomso, Kumasi, Ghana
- Cannon Wax, Jamestown, Accra, Ghana

== Group exhibitions ==
2025

- A Necessary Fiction: Maps, Art, and Models of Our World, Saudi Ministry of Culture, Venice, Italy

2025

- TPB Biennial Phuket, Phuket, Thailand
- Kochi-Muziris Biennale, Kochi, India
- What Are Our Collective Dreams?, Zachęta – National Gallery of Art, Warsaw, Poland
- The Life of Things, Museum V oorlinden, Wassenaar, Netherlands
- Bi_AM – International Art Biennial of Antioquia and Medellín, Medellìn, Colombia
- Re-Constellations – 5th Hangzhou Triennial of Fiber Art, Hangzhou, China
- Carriers, Goodman Gallery, Johannesburg, South Africa

2024

- Imagining Black Diasporas: 21st Century Art and Poetics, Los Angeles County Museum of Art, California
- Janus, Palazzo Diedo Berggruen Arts & Culture, Venice
- Garden of Scars, Malta Biennale, Malta and Gozo, Republic of Malta
- In the Presence of Absence, Desert X AlUla, Saudi Arabia
- REFUGE, Lagos Biennial, Nigeria

2023

- In Brilliant Light, Museum Volkenkunde, Leiden, Germany
- Chicago Architecture Biennial, Illinois
- 35th Bienal de São Paulo, Brazil
- Threads, Arnolfini Gallery, Bristol, UK
- Before Tomorrow, 30 years of Astrup Fearnley Museet, Astrup Fearnley Museet, Oslo
- Long-distance Friendships, Kaunas Biennial, Lithuania
- O Quilombisimo: Of Resisting and Insisting. Of Flight as Fight. Of Other Democratic Egalitarian Political Philosophies, Haus der Kulturen der Welt, Berlin
- Parliament of Ghosts, 18th International Architecture Exhibition of La Biennale di Venezia, Italy
- The Educational Web, Kuntervein Hamburg, Germany
- Thinking Historically in the Present, Sharjah Biennial 15, United Arab Emirates

2022

- Burning At The Edges, Longlati Foundation, Shanghai
- Contextile 2022, 6th Contemporary Textile Biennial, Guimarães, Portugal
- Revival: Materials and Monumental Forms, ICA Watershed, Boston, USA
- Christen Sveaas Art Foundation: The Unseen selected by Hurvin Anderson, Whitechapel Gallery, London
- Temporary Atlas: Cartographies of the Self in the Art of Today, Treviso Contemporanea, Italy

2021

- Narrow Gate of the Here-and-Now: Social Fabric, IMMA, Dublin
- WASTE X AGE: What can design do?, Design Museum, London
- Afro-Atlantic Histories, Museum of Fine Arts, Houston; National Gallery of Art, Washington, D.C. (2022); Los Angeles County Museum of Art, California (2023); Dallas Museum of Art, Texas (2023)
- Fourth Plinth Shortlist, National Gallery, London
- Congoville, Middelheim Museum, Antwerp
- Force Times Distance – On Labour and its Sonic Ecologies, Sonsbeek Biennale, The Netherlands

2020

- (Group) Global(e) Résistance, Centre Pompidou, Paris, France
- NIRIN, Artspace and Cockatoo Island, 22nd Biennale of Sydney, Australia
- Tomorrow, There Will Be More of Us, Stellenbosch Triennale, Cape Town

2019

- Tirana Patience, National Gallery of Arts, Tirana, Albania
- Future Genealogies, Tales From The Equatorial Line, 6th Lubumbashi Biennale, Democratic Republic of the Congo
- Working Labor, SAIC Sullivan Galleries, Chicago, US
- Ghana Freedom, Ghana Pavilion, Arsenale, 58th Venice Biennale, Italy
- UNTITLED, Frieze Sculpture, Rockefeller Center, New York, US
- Eldorama, Tripostal, Lille, France
- Kubatana, Vestfossen Kunstlaboratorium, Vestfossen, Norway
- Dirty Protest: Selections from the Hammer Contemporary Collection, Hammer Museum, Los Angeles, US
- Material Insanity, Museum of African Contemporary Art Al Maaden (MACAAL), Marrakech, Morocco

2018

- Torre Matarazzo, Sao Paulo, Brazil
- Radical Histories, 2012–2018, Nuit Blanche, Toronto, Canada
- Memory Palace, White Cube, London, UK
- 0.10 RELOADED, Avantgarde 2018, Galerie Sabine Knust, Munich
- Time is the Game of Man, European ArtEast Foundation, Castello di Brolio, Gaiole In Chianti, Italy
- Histórias Afro Atlânticas, MASP Museu de Arte de Sao Paulo Assis Chateaubriand, São Paulo, Brazil
- Non-Orientable Nkansa, Art Basel Unlimited, Basel, Switzerland
- No Time For Caution 1966, 2014–2018, La Biennale de l'Art africain contemporain: DAK'ART, Dakar, Senegal
- Pulling at Threads: the Woven Object in Contemporary Art, The Norval Foundation Art Gallery, Cape Town
- EX AFRICA, Centro Cultural Banco de Brasil, São Paulo, Rio de Janeiro; Brasilia
- Triângulo do Atlântico, 11ª Bienal de Artes Visuais do Mercosul, Porto Alegre, Brazil

2017

- Manipulate the World, Moderna Museet, Stockholm
- EX AFRICA, Centro Cultural Banco de Brasil, Belo Horizonte, Brazil
- Documenta 14, Kassel, Germany and Athens
- Future Generation Art Prize at Venice, Palazzo Contarini Polignac, Event of the 57th Venice Biennale (touring exhibition)
- Future Generation Art Prize, PinchukArtCentre, Kyiv, Ukraine
- When the Heavens Meet the Earth, Selected Works from the Robert Devereux Sina Jina Collection of Contemporary Art, The Heong Gallery at Downing College, Cambridge, UK

2016

- Cornfields in Accra, Museum of Science and Technology, Accra, Ghana
- An Age of Our Own Making, Kunsthal Charlottenborg, Copenhagen

2015

- Material Effects, Eli and Edythe Broad Museum, Michigan State University, East Lansing, Michigan
- The Gown Must Go To Town, Museum of Science and Technology, Accra, Ghana
- All the World's Futures, Arsenale, 56th Venice Biennale, Italy
- Broken English, Tyburn Gallery, London
- Panagaea II, Saatchi Gallery, London
- Artist's Rooms, K21, Düsseldorf

2014

- Pangaea New Art from Africa and Latin America, Saatchi Gallery, London
- Masked and Unmasked, Dak'Art OFF, Saint Louis, Senegal

2011

- Illumination, Installation, K.N.U.S.T Museum, Kumasi, Ghana

2009

- Hatching Out, K.N.U.S.T Museum, Kumasi, Ghana

== Public collections ==
His work is held in major public and private collections worldwide, including:

- Astrup Fearnley Museet, Oslo, Norway
- Baltimore Museum of Art, Baltimore, Maryland, US
- Centre Georges Pompidou, Paris, France
- Collezione La Gaia, Busca, Italy
- Fondazione Giuliani, Rome, Italy
- Fondation H, Madagascar
- Hammer Museum, Los Angeles, California, US
- Hessel Museum of Art, Bard College, Annandale-on-Hudson, New York, US
- Hirshhorn Museum and Sculpture Garden, Washington, D.C., US
- Instituto Inhotim, Brumadinho, Minas Gerais, Brazil
- K11 Art Foundation, Hong Kong
- Longlati Foundation, Shanghai, China
- Long Museum, Shanghai, China
- Los Angeles County Museum of Art (LACMA), Los Angeles, California, US
- Madre Museum, Naples, Italy
- Margulies Collection, Miami, Florida, US
- National Gallery of Art, Washington, D.C., US
- National Gallery of Canada, Ottawa, Canada
- Nelson-Atkins Museum of Art, Kansas City, Missouri, US
- Norwich Castle Museum, Norwich, UK
- Pino Pascali Foundation, Polignano a Mare, Italy
- Museo Reina Sofía, Madrid, Spain
- Voorlinden Museum, Wassenaar, The Netherlands
- The Studio Museum in Harlem, New York, US
- Whitworth Art Gallery, Manchester, UK
- Zinsou Foundation, Benin

== Awards and recognition ==
Ibrahim Mahama has been featured on ArtReview's annual Power 100 list of the most influential people in the contemporary art world in 2021, 2022, 2023, and 2024. In 2025, he became the first African to top the ArtReview's Power 100 most influential people's list and was honoured in Ghana as one of 5 creatives to receive diplomatic passprts for their service to the nation. He has also been featured on The Africa Report's list of the 100 Most Influential Africans.

He has received several notable awards and recognitions, including:

- 2026: Chevalier de l'Ordre des Arts et des Lettres. France
- 2026: Arnold Bode Prize, by the City of Kassel, Germany
- 2025: GUBA Black Star – Impact in Visual Arts Award; Barbados
- 2025: Established Artist Award, Art Basel, Basel
- 2024: Sam Gilliam Award, Dia Art Foundation, New York
- 2021: Pino Pascali Award, Polignano a Mare, Italy
- 2020: Prince Claus Award, Prince Claus Fund, Amsterdam
- 2010: Paa Kwame Award, Department of Painting, KNUST, Kumasi, Ghana

Hans Ulrich Obrist, Lydia Ourahmane, and Ibrahim Mahama at Art Basel

Curators have praised both the conceptual depth and civic impact of his practice; Koyo Kouoh, director of the Zeitz Museum of Contemporary Art Africa in Cape Town, has described Mahama's work as "communal and generative," noting that he has forged a "distinctive way to connect the critical reading of history with community‑oriented art‑making." Similarly, Bonaventure Soh Bejeng Ndikung, director of the House of World Cultures in Berlin, has called Mahama "one of the world's greatest archivists," adding, "this brother wants to go far. His timescale is 1,000 years."

Gemma Curtin, curator of Waste Age: What Can Design Do? at the Design Museum in London, noted Mahama's "interest in the process of making things, the labour that goes into it and the impact of that process on people and place." Azu Nwagbogu, curator and founder of the African Artist Foundation, has highlighted "Mahama balks at Western ideas around conservation, viewing them as undermining of artistic progress in Africa; rather, he sees the function of institutions in terms of their being drivers of progress and mechanisms through which to engineer the refreshing of ideas."

Marie-Ann Yemsi, curator of Ubuntu, a Lucid Dream at the Palais de Tokyo, has said that "Ibrahim is playing a huge part in decolonising the imagination." Alison de Lima Greene, curator of Afro-Atlantic Histories at the Museum of Fine Arts, Houston, has described Mahama's work as "a very important corrective to that idealised colonialist vision."

Ghanaian contemporary artist Ibrahim Mahama won the Gold Award in the Established Artist category at the inaugural 2025 Art Basel Awards in Miami Beach, recognising his excellence and innovation in contemporary art on the global stage. He became the first African to top ArtReview’s Global Power 100 list in 2025, a major milestone for Ghanaian contemporary art on the world stage. Mahama also won the 2026 Arnold Bode Prize in Germany with a cash prize of €10,000.

== Publications ==
- TRANSFER(S), Kunsthalle Osnabrück, 2024, ISBN 978-3-95476-667-3
- Voli-ni, Ibrahim Mahama and Eva Brioschi, Lenz, 2022, ISBN 979-12-80579-20-1
- Vanishing Points 2014–2020, Edited by Torsten Reiter and Alexander Bär, Kerber Verlag, 2021, ISBN 978-3-7356-0778-2
- Labour of Many, Norval Foundation, 2019, ISBN 978-0-639-96731-8
- 'Inside the White Cube', Bernard Akoi-Jackson, Ibrahim Mahama and Robin Riskin, White Cube, 2017, ISBN 978-1-910844-18-2
- Songs about Roses, Aby Gaye-Duparc Godelive Kasangati Kabena, Fruitmarket Gallery, 2024, ISBN 978-1-908-61272-4

== Legal dispute ==
In 2013, Ibrahim Mahama became involved in a legal dispute with art dealer Stefan Simchowitz and gallerist Jonathan Ellis King. The case concerned the unauthorized alteration and sale of Mahama's jute sack works. Mahama alleged the dealers had modified and sold the works without his consent, violating his moral rights under the Visual Artists Rights Act. The dealers claimed they had an agreement to produce and sell derivative pieces. The parties reached a confidential settlement in 2016.

== Fire Tragedy ==
On Wednesday February 8, 2026, fire engulfed one of Ibrahim's heritage train he owns. The train was part of Ghana’s oldest railway stock, which is no longer in operation, and had been acquired by Ibrahim as part of his preservation efforts towards relics and heritage artifacts.

== Personal life ==
Mahama resides in Ghana and is married to Khadija Yussif Iddi.
