= Azu Nwagbogu =

Nigerian art curator (born 1975)

Azu Nwagbogu (born 1975) is a Nigerian art curator and National Geographic Explorer at Large. He is the Founder and Director of the African Artists' Foundation, the LagosPhoto Festival and creator of Art Base Africa, an emerging virtual space dedicated to exploring and understanding contemporary African art and diaspora. He was awarded Curator of Year by the Royal Photographic Society in 2021, and included on the ArtReview list of the 100 most powerful people of the art world in 2021, 2022, 2023, 2024 and 2025. In 2024 he curated Benin's inaugural pavilion at the Venice Biennale.

== Life and work ==
Azu Nwagbogu was born in 1975 in Lagos, Nigeria. His higher education includes degrees from the University of Benin in Benin, Nigeria in 1997 and The University of Cambridge in 2005.

In 2007, he established The African Artists' Foundation (AAF), a non-profit organization based in Lagos, Nigeria. The African Artists' Foundation promotes African art and its artists through exhibitions, festivals, competitions, residencies, and workshops. The Foundation has, with the establishment of the National Art Competition in 2008, LagosPhoto Festival in 2010, and its residency program raised international awareness of African creativity.

Working as a freelance curator, he has curated exhibitions at institutions globally including This is Lagos at the African Artists' Foundation (2009), Dey Your Lane! Lagos Variations at BOZAR The Centre for Fine Arts (2016), Tear my Bra for the Rencontres d'Arles (2016), Samuel Fosso: An African Odyssey for Photo Espana in Madrid (2018) and James Ostrer: Johnny Just Came at the Gazelli Art House, London (2018). In 2018, he curated the exhibition Colomental at the Staatliche Museen which explored ways of expanding museums beyond Western paradigms and incorporating trans-cultural and non-Western artistic traditions.

In 2017, he was appointed Curator at Large of Photography at the Zeitz MOCAA Museum, Cape Town, South Africa. He became Chief Curator the following year and served as Director till 2018. In 2019, he curated the exhibition Still Here Tomorrow to High Five You Yesterday, which included work from 40 artists from Africa and its diaspora. The exhibition addressed themes of travel and migration through imagined and alternative realities. That same year, he curated the exhibition Why Should I Hesitate: Putting Drawing to Work, which presented the work of artist William Kentridge, including works on view for the first time in South Africa.

In 2021, he launched the restitution project Searching For Prince Adewale Oyenuga in Malaga and Lagos. In 2022, Nwagbogu launched the exhibition project, Dig Where You Stand, From Coast to Coast (DWYS) which presented a new model of engagement with questions of decolonization, restitution, and repatriation. The exhibition was first presented at Ibrahim Mahama's Savannah Centre for Contemporary Art (SCCA) in Tamale, Ghana. The exhibition series explored the regenerative potential of art across the African continent and its diasporas, looking beyond Western museums.

In 2022, Azu Nwagbogu was appointed as one of the first curators of Buro Stedelijk, a new platform for contemporary African art based in Amsterdam. In 2023, he was named Explorer at Large by the National Geographic Society, recognizing his work documenting the world's diverse cultures and environments.

In 2022 he was appointed chief curator of Benin's inaugural pavilion at the Venice Biennale by President Patrice Talon. The 2024 pavilion centered on the theme of restitution with artworks by artists Romuald Hazoumé, Chloe Quenum, Ishola Akpo and Moufoli Bello. The artworks explore African feminism and draw on the Gelede which is a ceremony performed by women in tribute to the primordial mother, and a means of celebrating the spiritual and physical roles of women in Yoruba societies. Nwagbogu has explained that the pavilion is an extension of the 2022 exhibition The Art of Benin of Yesterday and Today: from Restitution to Revelation, which presented 26 Beninois objects looted by the French army in 1892 but eventually returned to the country by France's Quai Branly Museum. The exhibition included contemporary artworks that responded to the 200-year-old looted objects.

He has served on juries, advisory boards, and curatorial teams including the Dutch Doc (2012–15), POPCAP Photography Awards (2012–22), Prisma Photography Award (2015), Greenpeace Photo Award (2016), New York Times Portfolio Review (2017–20), Magnum Photography Award (2017), W. Eugene Smith Award (2018), Photo Espana (2018), Foam Paul Huf Award (2019), Wellcome Photography Prize (2019), The World Press Photo (2020), Social Impact Art Prize (2020), Photo Vogue Festival (2015 -), the Prix Carmignac (2022), Leica Oskar Barnack Award (LOBA) (2022), Umrao Singh Sher-Gil Grant for Photography (2022), Head-On Photo Awards and FORMAT Festival (2022). In June 2023, Azu participated in The Todi Circle, an annual event held in Todi, Umbria, curated by William A. Ewing and organized by Mario Santoro-Woith.

== Publications ==
In 2014, he founded the online journal Art Base Africa which focuses on contemporary art from Africa and Diaspora.

He has contributed to several publications, including Martin Roemers: Metropolis (2016), Joana Choumali: Hââbré, the last generation (2018), Making Africa: A Continent of Contemporary Design (2015), Africa Under the Prism Contemporary African Photography from LagosPhoto Festival (2015), Dey your Lane! Lagos Variations (2015) and Raquel Van Haver - Spirits Of The Soil (2018).

== Recognition ==
In 2021, Azu Nwagbogu was awarded Curator of Year by the Royal Photographic Society in the United Kingdom. He has been named to ArtReview's list of the 100 most powerful figures in contemporary art for five consecutive years (2021–2025), rising to No. 45 in 2025. He was nominated as Curator for the Prix Decouverte Rencontres d'Arles (2014), Photoquai (2015), Photolux Festival (2015) and Breda Photo (2018). In 2026 he was an Art Basel Award Medalist for Curator.
