= Nana Oforiatta Ayim =

Ghanaian-British writer, art historian and filmmaker

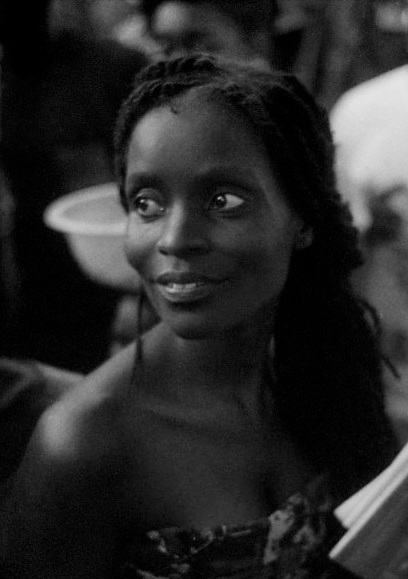
- August 2015, Chale Wote Street Art Festival
- Born: Nana Ofosuaa Oforiatta Ayim; Ghana
- Other name: Nana Oforiatta-Ayim
- Citizenship: Ghanaian
- Education: University of Bristol; SOAS University of London
- Occupations: Writer, art historian, filmmaker
- Notable work: The God Child
- Website: www.nanaoforiattaayim.com

Nana Oforiatta Ayim is a Ghanaian writer, art historian and filmmaker.

== Background ==
Nana Ofosuaa Oforiatta Ayim was raised in Germany, England, and her ancestral homeland in Ghana. She studied Russian and Politics at the University of Bristol and went on to work in the Department of Political Affairs at the United Nations in New York. She completed her master's degree in African Art History at SOAS University of London.

Oforiatta Ayim comes from a political family in Ghana, the Ofori-Attas, whose power spans both the traditional and the modern. Her maternal grandfather was Nana Sir Ofori Atta I, the renowned king of Akyem Abuakwa who was hailed as the Louis XIV of Africa, and her great-uncle was J. B. Danquah, the scholar and politician who gave Ghana its name and started the political party that brought about Independence.

== Writing ==
Her first novel The God Child was published by Bloomsbury Publishing in the UK in 2019, the US in 2020 and by Penguin Random House in Germany in 2021. Writer Ayesha Harruna Attah describes the book as an "expansive and contemplative debut, themes of art, history, literature, film, and legacy intermingle with Maya's coming-of-age. In the New York Times, Tope Folarin writes: "This is a story that is obsessed with stories; indeed, 'The God Child' could be described as a series of sharply drawn short fictions, each consequential on its own, each only glancingly connected to the others… As I read this book, with all its leaps in time and space, I sometimes had the sense that there was another narrative running just beneath the surface of the text, some alternate story that the characters I was reading about simultaneously inhabited… Kojo and Maya's migrations eventually lead them back to Ghana, where they hope to find material they need to complete their story, years in the making. A story that, like this one, will illuminate Ghana's history; a story that will coax something whole from the broken parts of their lives." In The Guardian, Sarah Ladipo Manyika writes: "To date, there are only a few works of fiction that explore the African experience within continental Europe and just a handful address the Afro-German experience, so Ayim's book is important in helping to fill this gap. As we hear Maya pondering Goethe's idea of Weltliteratur and reflecting on just how lacking world literature actually is, books such as The God Child have the potential to enrich it and, in Berger's words, bring new ways of seeing."

== Art history ==
While researching for her master's degree in African Art History, she realised all the terms and concepts used to describe Ghanaian artistic expression were Western ones. Her research for indigenous concepts led her to the Ayan, a form of telling history in Ghana; and the Afahye, a historical exhibition or Gesamtkunstwerk model. She began incorporating them in her writing on cultural narratives, histories, and institutions in Africa. She speaks regularly on new models of knowledge and of museums, and devised a course on this for the Architectural Association School of Architecture.

In an interview with the Financial Times, Ayim said: "It sometimes feels like everything happens in the diaspora. That's important and it's part of who we are. But now we need to focus on evolving work within our continent." She is the founder of the ANO Institute of Arts & Knowledge in Accra, and has said that "like a lot of people involved in creative work in Ghana and other parts of Africa, it feels like it's not just enough for us to produce, but that we have to provide the context and the paradigms for that production."

To this end, she created a pan-African Cultural Encyclopaedia. The New York Times reviewer writes: "The encyclopaedia will consist of an open-source internet platform for documenting past, present and future African arts and culture (starting with Ghana) and eventually will be published in 54 volumes, one for each country. An ambitious undertaking, the Cultural Encyclopaedia aims to change perceptions of the continent and help alleviate the frustration of African cultural producers concerned that their rich histories have been lost or forgotten over the decades because they lack good archives."

Ayim has also created a new type of mobile museum. In The Guardian, Charlotte Jansen writes: "Ayim said she started to reflect on the museum model in Africa while working at the British Museum. Struck by how differently African objects were encountered in display cabinets in the UK with how they were actively used in festivals back home, she began to think about how material culture could be preserved and presented in a way that was more in keeping with local traditions." Ayim is using the research gathered through the mobile museum to help create a new kind of museum model for the Government of Ghana that, she writes in The Art Newspaper, "honours and takes into account the many spirits of our communities, our environment, and our objects, both at home and those to be returned. A structure that will allow for narratives and exchange with, and across, other parts of the world, on equal terms".

After developing the narratives for, and curating the first institutional shows of, several Ghanaian artists, including James Barnor, Felicia Ansah Abban and Ibrahim Mahama, she curated the much acclaimed Ghana Freedom exhibition as Ghana's first ever Pavilion at the 2019 Venice Biennale. The pavilion was among the Biennale's most anticipated, and multiple journalists named the pavilion as a "triumph" and highlight of the Biennale, particularly in tribute to its cultural underpinnings both in the country and the diaspora. The Art Newspaper wrote that "a palpable sense of pride" permeated the pavilion. Charlotte Higgins of The Guardian wrote that the pavilion marked a subtle shift in balance as African national pavilions begin to contest the historic dominance of European pavilions at the Biennale, a history intertwined with colonialism.

== Films ==
Nana Oforiatta Ayim became a filmmaker after working with economist Thi Minh Ngo and filmmaker Chris Marker on a new translation of his 1954 film Statues Also Die. Her films are a cross of fiction, travel essay, and documentary and have been shown at museums globally. These include Nowhere Else But Here at The New Museum, Tied and True at the Tate Modern, Jubilee at the Kunsthall Stavanger, and Agbako at the Los Angeles County Museum of Art (LACMA).

== Awards and honours ==
Oforiatta Ayim is the recipient of the 2015 Art & Technology Award from LACMA and of the 2016 AIR Award, which "seeks to honour and celebrate extraordinary African artists who are committed to producing provocative, innovative and socially-engaging work". She was named one of the Apollo "40 under 40", as "one of the most talented and inspirational young people who are driving forward the art world today", a Quartz Africa Innovator, for "finding new approaches and principles to tackle many of the intractable challenges faced on the continent", one of 50 African Trailblazers by The Africa Report, one of 12 African women making history in 2016 and one of 100 women "building infrastructure, both literally and metaphorically, for future generations in Africa and in the Diaspora" in 2020 by OkayAfrica. She was a Global South Visiting Fellow at the University of Oxford, and is a member of the university's Advisory Council. She received the Ghana Innovation Award in 2020 and the Woman of The Year Award in Ghana in 2021. In 2022, she was awarded the Dan David Prize.

== See also ==
- Ghana Freedom exhibition
