= Ghana Freedom =

2019 art exhibition

Ghana Freedom was a Ghanaian art exhibition at the 2019 Venice Biennale, an international contemporary art biennial in which countries represent themselves through self-organizing national pavilions. The country's debut pavilion, also known as the Ghana pavilion, was highly anticipated and named a highlight of the overall Biennale by multiple journalists. The six participating artists—Felicia Abban, John Akomfrah, El Anatsui, Selasi Awusi Sosu, Ibrahim Mahama, and Lynette Yiadom-Boakye—represented a range of artist age, gender, locations, and prestige, selected by curator Nana Oforiatta Ayim. The show paired young and old artists across sculpture, filmmaking, and portraiture, and emphasized common threads across postcolonial Ghanaian culture in both its current inhabitants and the diaspora. Almost all of the art was commissioned specifically for the pavilion. Architect David Adjaye designed the pavilion with rusty red walls of imported soil to reflect the cylindrical, earthen dwellings of the Gurunsi within the Biennale's Arsenale exhibition space. The project was supported by the Ghana Ministry of Tourism and advised by former Biennale curator Okwui Enwezor. After the show's run, May–November 2019, works from the exhibition were set to display in Accra, Ghana's capital.

== Background ==
The Venice Biennale is an international art biennial exhibition held in Venice, Italy. Often described as "the Olympics of the art world", participation in the Biennale is a prestigious event for contemporary artists. The festival has become a constellation of shows: a central exhibition curated by that year's artistic director, national pavilions hosted by individual nations, and independent exhibitions throughout Venice. The Biennale parent organization also hosts regular festivals in other arts: architecture, dance, film, music, and theater.

Outside of the central, international exhibition, individual nations produce their own shows, known as pavilions, as their national representation. Nations that own their pavilion buildings, such as the 30 housed on the Giardini, are responsible for their own upkeep and construction costs as well. Nations without dedicated buildings create pavilions in venues throughout the city.

== Description ==
The pavilion, located in the Venice Arsenale building's Artiglierie (artillery), was made to reflect Ghana in both the material and architectural style of its construction. In reflection of the earthen, cylindrical homes of Gurunsi villages, the pavilion is partitioned into elliptical rooms by rusty red walls of imported Ghanaian soil.

In what journalists described as an all-star lineup, six artists presented work at the Ghana pavilion. El Anatsui's bottletop sculptures were known for their high prices at auction. Felicia Abban was a photographer for the country's first president, and the country's first female professional portrait photographer. Lynette Yiadom-Boakye, a painter, was a Turner Prize nominee in 2013. John Akomfrah was known internationally for his films. Younger artists include Ibrahim Mahama and Selasi Awusi Sosu. Their works share themes of reappropriation, memory and restitution, and representation. Some of the artists do not live in Ghana but consider the country part of their identities. The selected artists were designed to highlight Ghana's range of diversity in gender, age, and location. The show emphasized shared culture in the African diaspora, as only half of the artists currently reside in Ghana. Almost all of the art was commissioned specifically for the pavilion.

The pavilion is presented in pairings. Its two entrances open unto sculptures by Anatsui and Mahama, artists marked by difference in age and stature but both using similar genres and media. Anatsui's Earth Shedding Its Skin (2019), on a theme of ecological and self-renewal, consists of three new wall hangings made from flattened yellow bottle caps and strung with copper wire, in reference to the ravages of gold panning on Ghanaian rivers. Mahama's A Straight Line through the Carcass of History 1649 (2016–9), on a theme of connecting tradition and modernity, is a bunker-like installation of smoked fish mesh, cloth, wood, and archival material, such as maps and exercise books, linking the technology that changed Ghana's fishing industry with the threat that technology poses to the rivers. Deeper within the pavilion are portraits by Yiadom-Boakye and Abban. Yiadom-Boakye's paintings show imaginary figures in inventive spaces, and Abban's black-and-white photographs show herself and other women in the 1960s and 70s. Akomfrah's three-channel video installation, The Elephant in the Room – Four Nocturnes (2019) and Awusi Sosu's Glass Factory II (2019) both use poetic visuals to show postcolonial Africa's cultural landscape. Again, the experienced Akomfrah is paired with Awusi Sosu, for whom the Biennale was her first major international show. While both works showcase a forgotten, fragmented history, Akonfrah's installation juxtaposes West African violence while Awusi Sosu focuses on the rise and decline of glass factories in independent Ghana. Akomfrah described art as a dialogue and therefore the Venice pavilion extended Ghana into the world's biggest conversation.

== Production ==
For the 58th Venice Biennale in 2019, Ghana and three other countries participated in the biennial for the first time. The show's title, "Ghana Freedom", refers to a song by E. T. Mensah written to commemorate the state's 1957 independence. Ghana was one of eight African nations at the 58th Biennale.

The Ghana Ministry of Tourism supported the project, which was intended both to increase Ghana's international stature and to increase tourism. At the pavilion's May opening, which First Lady Rebecca Akufo-Addo also attended, tourism minister Barbara Oteng Gyasi described the pavilion as part of Ghana's efforts both to become the premier tourist destination in sub-Saharan Africa and to welcome members of the diaspora to return home. The pavilion's curator, Nana Oforiatta Ayim, and its architect, David Adjaye, had previously worked with the government on national museum and art initiatives intended to support the country's international profile. The two believed that Ghana had more cultural power than was credited internationally, and the government approved their pavilion proposal. Oforiatta Ayim originally intended to focus the Biennale pavilion on a single Ghana-based artist but was convinced to expand the show—"come out all guns blazing"—by Okwui Enwezor, an advisor who had curated the 2015 Venice Biennale. Enwezor's Biennale also influenced the artist selection, as both Akomfrah and Mahama had big installations there and Anatsui had won its lifetime achievement prize. The pavilion is dedicated to Enwezor, who died before the pavilion opened. Oforiatta Ayim saw the pavilion and its focus on Ghanaian culture and diasporas as being part of an international conversation about connections between a diasporic people and their culture, especially the repatriation of culture. Simultaneous with the pavilion, workshops and pop-up exhibitions are planned in Ghana. Works from the pavilion were set to display in Accra, Ghana's capital, after the exhibition closed in November 2019.

The show was meant to provide multiple views into postcolonial Ghana and the influence of independence on Ghanaian art. Taiye Selasi's exhibition catalog essay, "Who's Afraid of a National Pavilion?" emphasizes that the pavilion is less to make conclusions about Ghana as a whole than to challenge assumptions about the country, its continent, and "African art". Philosopher Kwame Anthony Appiah wrote the catalog's lead essay.

== Reception ==
The pavilion was among the Biennale's most anticipated, and multiple journalists named the pavilion as a "triumph" and highlight of the Biennale, particularly in tribute to its cultural underpinnings both in the country and the diaspora. The Art Newspaper wrote that "a palpable sense of pride" permeated the pavilion. But while the artistic firepower was impressive, the New York Times did not consider the show revelatory, particularly since Anatsui already won a lifetime achievement prize at the 2015 Biennale. Of the individual works, the Financial Times considered Anatsui's new tapestries to be the pavilion's best. While The Art Newspaper wrote that Akomfrah's three-channel film united the pavilion's themes, Frieze thought its clichés did not meet the level of allegory. Of the three artist pairings, Artnet News found the Yiadom-Boakye and Abban portraits to be the richest, with Abban's portraits offering a new narrative for studio photography in West Africa, previously best associated with Seydou Keïta and Malick Sidibé. The publication additionally praised Mahama's archival fish smells for being evocative without becoming overbearing. While pavilions were rarely designed by famous architects, Frieze found Adjaye's womblike scenery to cast an ambiance unlike any other show in Venice. Charlotte Higgins of The Guardian wrote that the pavilion marked a subtle shift in balance as African national pavilions begin to contest the historic dominance of European pavilions at the Biennale, a history intertwined with colonialism. While governments worldwide decreased their arts funding, Ghana resisted the trend to wield art as diplomatic soft power and position Accra as a major cultural hub in Africa. Though Cape Town and Marrakesh had more robust arts infrastructure, the African continent lacked a definitive art market center while Ghana's economy and tourism budget continued to grow rapidly.
