= Deo Gratias Photo Studio =

Photographic Studio in Ghana

Deo Gratias Photo Studio is a photo studio in Ghana. It was founded by James Koblah Bruce Vanderpuije and sons; Isaac Hudson and Ernest John in 1922. It is the oldest operating photographic studio in Ghana. It is located in Jamestown. The studio is currently being managed by the grand daughter of J. K Bruce Vanderpuije- Kate Tamakloe Vanderpuije. "Deo Gratias" is a Latin expression which means Thanks be to God.

== History ==
Born in 1899, James belonged to a middle-class family in Jamestown in Accra, Ghana (then Gold Coast). He began learning photography from his master; J.A.C. Holm when he was 20 years old. After three years of apprenticeship, he founded his own studio by the name; Deo Gratias Photo Studio. His interest in photography led him to make portraits of British and Indian families, as well as black aristocrats. Prior to the 1970s, he worked with companies to cover product launches and rebranding exercises.

Vanderpuije's son Isaac Hudson joined his father after schooling for sometime until he gained a government scholarship to study at High School for Graphic and Book Art (Hoch Schule für Grafiek und Buch Kunst), Leipzig, Germany. He was the first African to gain admission at the school's faculty of photography where he studied for five years.
