= College of Art and Built Environment (KNUST) =

College in Ghana

Coordinates: 6.6743°N 1.5647°W

- Vice-Chancellor: Prof Rita Akosua Dickson
- Provost: Prof. John Tiah Bugri
- Location: Kumasi, Ghana
- Colours: Red and White
- Website: https://cabe.knust.edu.gh/

The College of Art and Built Environment came into existence in January 2005 in Kumasi, Ghana, as part of the restructuring of the Kwame Nkrumah University of Science and Technology into a Collegiate System. In the restructuring, the Faculty of Environmental and Development studies (FEDS) and the Institute of Land Management and Development (ILMAD) were merged to form the college.

== Leadership ==
- Provost - Prof. John Tiah Bugri
- College Registrar - Ms. Josephine K. Djampim
- College Finance Officer - Mrs. Catherine Acquah
- College Librarian - Mr. David V. K. Akorfu

== Faculties & Departments ==
=== Faculty of Built Environment ===
- Department of Architecture
- Department of Planning
- Department of Construction Technology Management
- Department of Land Economy

=== Faculty of Arts ===
- Department of Industrial Art
- Department of Publishing Studies
- Department of Painting and Sculpture
- Department of Communication Design

=== Faculty of Educational Studies ===
- Department of Educational Innovations in Science and Technology
- Department of Teacher education

== Students ==
- Architectural Students' Association Ghana (ASAG)
- Construction Technology and Management Students' Society (CTMSS)
- Ghana Association of Student Planners (GASP)
- Land Management and Development Students' Association (LAMDSA)

== Research ==
=== Institute of Human Settlements Research ===
- Centre for Land Studies
- Centre for Settlements Studies
