= African Artists' Foundation =

Nigerian non-profit organization

- Formation: 2007
- Type: Non-profit organisation
- Location: Lagos, Nigeria
- Founder: Azu Nwagbogu
- Website: www.africanartists.org

The African Artists' Foundation (AAF) is a non-profit organization based in Lagos, Nigeria which was founded by Azu Nwagbogu. The foundation aims to develop contemporary art and establishing a platform for African arts and artists through art exhibitions, festivals, competitions, and workshops.

== Initiatives ==
Among the initiatives provided by the AAF is the Lagos Photo Festival, which was founded in 2009 and aims is to exhibit work of emerging African artists and the National Art Competition which was founded in 2008 that helps provide a platform for Nigerian artists.
