= Salih Basheer =

Sudanese photographer, born 1995

- صالح بشير
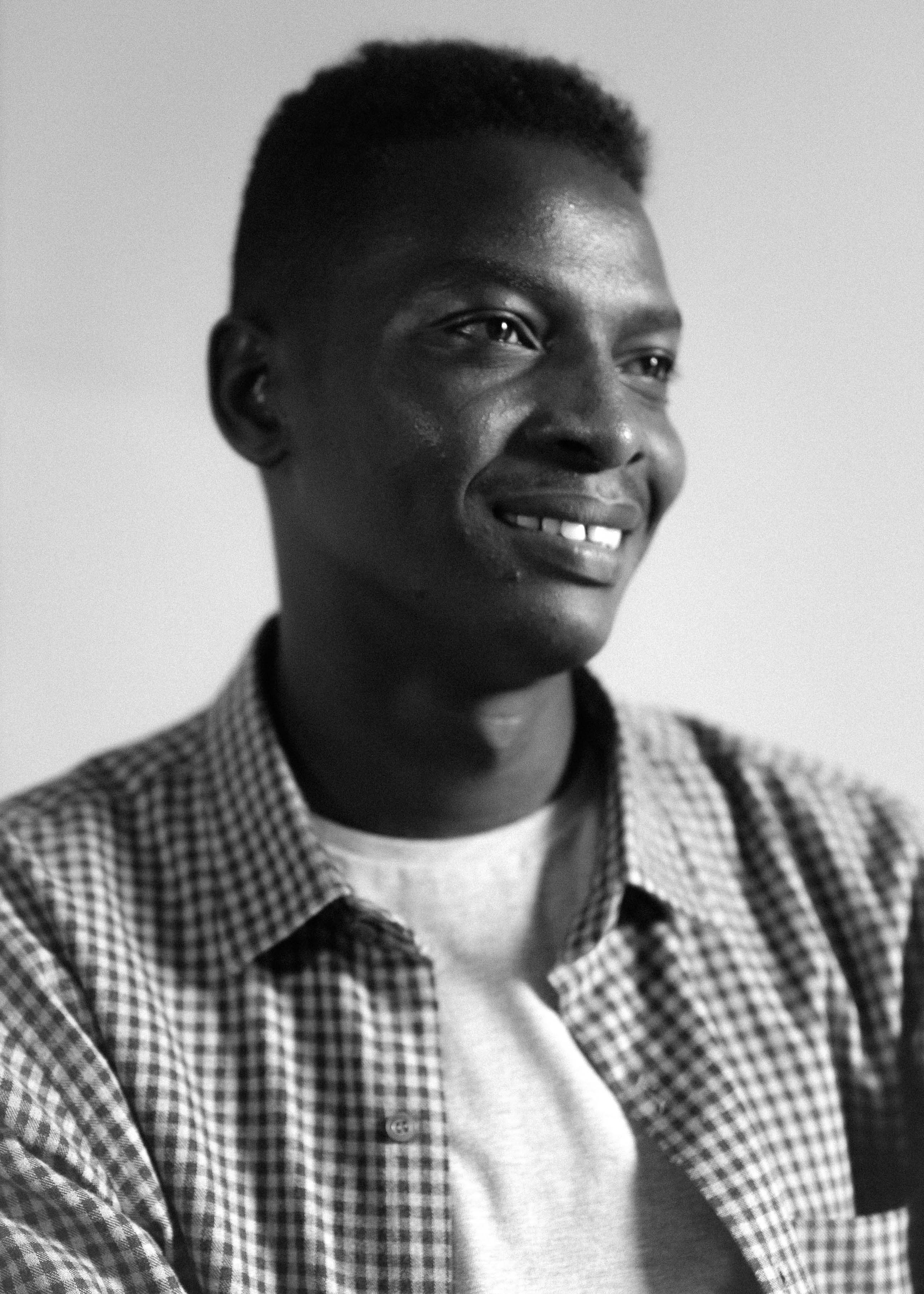
- Born: 1 January 1995 (age 31); Omdurman, Sudan
- Known for: Photography
- Movement: African photography
- Website: www.salihbasheer.com

Salih Basheer (Arabic: صالح بشير, born 1 January 1995) is a Sudanese photographer.

Since 2018, he has been awarded grants and prizes for photography, including by the Arles Photography Festival, the Arab Fund for Arts and Culture (AFAC), Magnum Foundation and the Prince Claus Fund. His photo stories have been exhibited in Ethiopia, the Netherlands, Germany, the United Kingdom, France and the United Arab Emirates. His 2023 publication 22 Days in Between was called the first photo-book ever by a Sudanese photographer.

== Early life and education ==
Basheer was born in Omdurman, Sudan. After finishing secondary school in Sudan, he moved to Cairo in 2013 and received his Bachelor's degree in Geography from Cairo University in 2017. During his studies in Egypt, he started as a self-taught photographer.

== Life and work ==
After his graduation, Basheer began to work on his first long-term project titled Sweet Taste Of Sugarcane. This documentary photo story about the harsh conditions of students in a khalwa, a Sudanese religious school, was shown at the international Addis Foto Fest in 2018.

His next project, called The Home Seekers, was supported by the Arab Fund for Arts and Culture (AFAC) in 2019. In this, Basheer recorded the everyday lives of other Sudanese refugees living in exile in Cairo and were "look[ing] inward in search for a 'home', looking for a better life and education". This visual story was exhibited in October 2021 at the Diffusion Festival in Cardiff, Wales, and the same year in France as part of the group exhibition "Mon ami n'est pas d'ici" at the Institut du Monde Arabe's exhibition space in Tourcoing, as well as at the festival "Les Rencontres à l'échelle" in Marseille.

In 2020, Basheer started a diploma course in photojournalism at the Danish School of Media and Journalism (DMJX) in Aarhus and was awarded a scholarship by The VII Foundation. In addition, he obtained the Shahidul Alam Grant for the development of independent photojournalism by the Danish School of Media and Journalism.

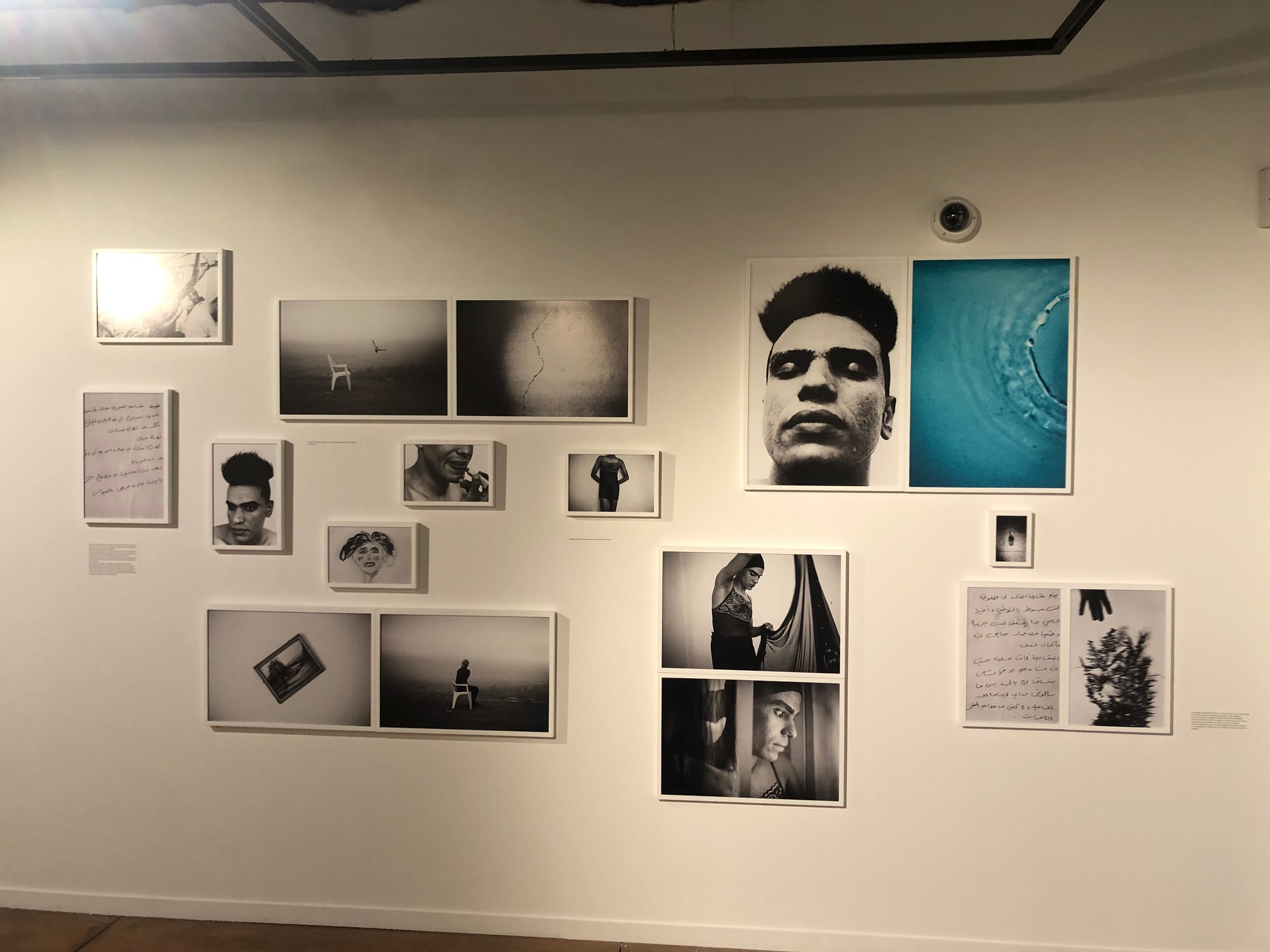
Exhibition of photographs at the Institut du Monde Arabe-Tourcoing

In 2021, Basheer received the W. Eugene Smith Memorial Fund student grant for his narrative project 22 Days in Between, remembering the loss of his parents and the challenges of settling into a new home with his grandmother. According to the fund,

"This project is Salih's visual process of learning more about his parents and himself and serves as a method of healing from the trauma of losing his parents. Salih says that having a camera in his hand gave him the courage and comfort level to ask questions about his parents and their deaths."

For the same visual story, Basheer was awarded the Everyday Projects Grant. In 2022, he received another grant from AFAC through their visual arts program for 22 Days in Between. His photographs were selected for the 2022 African Photography Encounters in Bamako, Mali.

In June 2022, the British Journal of Photography presented Basheer as one of 15 upcoming photographers to watch. In January 2023, Basheer published 22 Days in Between, the first ever photo-book by a Sudanese photographer, that evokes his early childhood and memories of his parents, who died within the period of 22 days, when Basheer was only 3 years old. An article in the British Journal of Photography described this photo-book as an "introspective narrative [...] explored through various formats: personal writing, self-portraits, archive images, and drawings that Basheer drew recently but from the perspective of a child – to uphold the idea that he is still a kid longing to bond with his parents." In his review in The Washington Post, Kenneth Dickerman said:

This is a remarkable book that plumbs the depths of memory and the building blocks of identity. It is a gem. It'll suck you in and is a profound excavation of what it means to be human, pitfalls, elation, misery and sadness combined.

== Publications ==
- 22 Days in Between: Photographs from Sudan, Copenhagen: Disko Bay, 2023. ISBN 9788797352632.
- The Return: 2026. ISBN 9789526588902.

== Grants and awards ==
- 2021, W. Eugene Smith Memorial Fund Student Grant
- 2021, Everyday Projects Grant
- 2019, Arab Documentary Photography Program, Magnum Foundation & the Prince Claus Fund
- 2022, AFAC Visual Arts Program
- 2022, Tasweer, The Sheikh Saoud Al Thani Awards
- 2022, Counter Histories initiative grant, Magnum Foundation
- 2022, Contemporary African Photography Prize, Shortlist
- 2023, Photo Textbook Award Winner at the Arles Photography Festival

== Group and solo exhibitions ==
- 2018, Addis Foto Fest, group exhibition, fifth edition, Addis Ababa, Ethiopia
- 2019, Slideshow Fest, the Odesa Photo Days Festival, Odesa, Ukraine
- 2019, Vantage Point Sharjah 7, Sharjah Art Foundation, Sharjah, United Arab Emirates
- 2019, Invisible Borders, slide show presentation, African Photography Encounters, Bamako, Mali
- 2020, Connecting views: 16 talents from the APJD, Africa Museum, Berg en Dal, the Netherlands
- 2021, World Press Photo exhibition, Oldenburg, Germany
- 2021, World Press Photo: Seen Through the lens of..., Tropenmuseum, Amsterdam
- 2021, Mon ami n'est pas d'ici, Institut du Monde Arabe-Tourcoing, Tourcoing, France
- 2022, African Photography Encounters, Bamako, Mali
- 2022-2023 Habibi, les révolutions de l'amour, Institut du monde Arabe, Paris, France
- 2023, Blue: Children of January, at Photofairs NY

== See also ==
- Photography in Sudan
