= Olagunju =

- Gender: Male
- Language: Yoruba

Origin
- Origin: Nigeria
- Meaning: Wealth/success is straightforward
- Region of origin: South-west Nigeria

Other names
- Short form: Ola

Olagunju audiois a Yoruba surname of Nigerian origin, meaning "Success/Wealth is Straightforward". Broken down into its components, Olagunju combines ọlá (wealth, nobility, success), gún (be straight), and ojú (face). The diminutive form includes "Ola" "Gunju", e.t.c. It is written in the Yoruba native language as "Ọlágúnjú".

Notable people with the name include:

- Mustapha Olagunju, English footballer
- Fatai Olagunju, Nigerian juju singer and writer
- Adéọlá Ọlágúnjú, Nigerian visual artist
- Linda Mabhena-Olagunju, South African businesswoman
