= Fatoumata Diabaté =

Malian photographer (born 1980)

- Born: 19 September 1980 (age 45); Bamako, Mali
- Education: Centre de Formation Audiovisuel Promo-Femmes
- Occupation: Photographer
- Awards: Blanchère Foundation Prize; Afrique en Créations Prize; Prix Afrique
- Website: fatoumatadiabate.com

Fatoumata Diabaté (born 19 September 1980) is a Malian photographer from Bamako.

== Education ==
In 2002, after spending nine months at the Centre de Formation Audiovisuel Promo-Femmes training center in Bamako, Diabaté continued her studies at the Centre de Formation en Photographie de Bamako (CFP), which aims to professionalize Malian photographers. She was given a two-week internship there. Later, she was spotted for her motivation and talent, then retained and trained for two more years. Diabaté then completed her training in Switzerland at the Vevey Professional Education Center and returned to the CFP in Bamako, where she was a technical assistant from 2007 to 2009. She also served an internship at the Central DUPON's professional printing laboratory in Paris. Her studies gave her the opportunity to improve her skills in black-and-white silver gelatin photography and to participate in many workshops in Mali, as well as abroad. She credits Malian photographer Seydou Keïta, who was a neighbor of hers when she was growing up, as a creative inspiration. Diabaté has also paid homage to Malick Sidibé, Samuel Fosso, and Oumar Ly, all masters of African studio photography.

== Career ==
Diabaté has participated in several group and individual exhibitions and has earned a number of awards, notably the Prix Afrique, given by the Association française d'action artistique following the 2005 Rencontres africaines de la photographie biennial, Bamako, where she took the Afrique en Créations prize for her work Touaregs, en gestes et en mouvements. Her camera of choice is an old-fashioned view camera, which she has used inside a portable studio/installation in her project Studio Photo de la Rue, to create staged scenes for her subjects, also a nod to the work of the masters of African studio photography noted above. She works in analog photographic processes, both black and white and color.

Diabaté has also photographed on commission for World Press Photo, Oxfam, Rolex, and the Bill and Melinda Gates Foundation.

== Selected exhibitions ==
- Rencontres africaines de la photographie (2005, 2009, and 2011 editions), Bamako, Mali.
- Photographing the Social Body: Malian Portraiture from the Studio to the Street (30 March 2012 – 18 May 2012), Carleton College Perlman Teaching Museum, Northfield, Minnesota.
- Bamako Photo in Paris (4 October 2013 – 7 December 2013), Pavillon Carré de Baudoin, Paris.
- The Night Belongs to Us / A nous la nuit (10 October 2013 – 1 December 2013), Galerie d'art Marabouparken, Sundbyberg.
- Bamako – Dakar (19 September 2014 – 23 November 2014), Stadthaus Ulm, Ulm.
- Femme photographe (6 December 2014 – 6 May 2015), Hôtel Onomo Dakar Airport, Dakar.
- New African Photography III (4–6 May 2018), Red Hook Labs, Brooklyn

== Selected awards ==
- 2005: Prix Afrique prize from the French Association for Artistic Action (AFAA) for her project Touaregs, en gestes et en mouvements.
- 2005: Afrique en Créations prize for Touaregs, en gestes et en mouvements.
- 2011: Blachère Foundation prize for her work entitled The Animal in Man.
