= Omar Victor Diop =

Senegalese photographer

- Born: 1980 (age 45–46); Dakar, Senegal
- Known for: Photography

Omar Victor Diop (born 1980) is a Senegalese photographer whose conceptually-rich work is exhibited around the world. He lives and works in Dakar and Paris, France.

== Early life and education ==
Omar Victor Diop was born in Dakar, Senegal. He is the youngest of six children, and his parents valued education as a means to pursue opportunity. He and his siblings attended optimal schooling from a young age, which resulted in a career in finance and corporate communications. He studied at the ESCE International Business School in Paris before working at Ernst & Young as an analyst, and then with British American Tobacco in the African international relations department.

After a year-long sabbatical from corporate life, Diop made a shift towards a career in the arts in 2010. His debut project, Fashion 2112, The Future of Beauty, was a series of photographs which was shown at the Pan African Exhibition of the African Biennale of Photography in Bamako, Mali (2011). The success and recognition of this project resulted in Diop's attention to photography exclusively.

== Work ==
Though Diop began his career in communications, by 2010 he had moved into the highly active territory of fashion photography. Prior to this, he had experimented in landscape photography, and later worked for fashion lines Bantu Wax and Adama Paris, among others. By September 2013, he had produced 70 percent of the commercial advertising market in Dakar. While he continues to work in the commercial field, his studio practice lies in the style of Fine Art portraiture; often self-portraiture. Diop uses his own body to restage historical events, encouraging "the viewer to question the narrative of history that we are traditionally taught and see Black people themselves as the agents of change." He produces work in series, and, much like Malian photographer Seydou Keïta, continues in the tradition of African studio photography.

== Series ==
Diop has released numerous series, including:

- Re-mixing Hollywood (2013) - a collaboration with the French-born American photographer Antoine Tempé. Consisting of 20 photographs, the series is based on iconic moments of popular American and French movies while replacing their subjects with individuals from Senegal and Côte d'Ivoire.
- Project Diaspora (2015) - a self-portrait series in which Diop recreates 15th and 16th century European paintings of educated, stylish, and confident historical figures of the African diaspora. Diop plans to widen Project Diaspora’s scope to Asia, the Americas and the Middle East.
- Hopeful Blues (2015) - a series which explores hope and resilience through portraits of refugees of the UN Refugee Agency. (Part of his exhibit titled REFUGEE.)
- Liberty (2016) - a photographic series which recounts, interprets and juxtaposes historically defining moments of black history.

== Exhibitions ==
Diop has participated in numerous exhibitions internationally, including:

=== Group exhibitions ===
- Untitled Miami Beach, Miami, Florida (2016)
- African Folk Art?: Contemporary Creations in Sub-Saharian Africa, FRAC, Aquitaine, France (2016)
- Paris Photo, Grand Palais, Paris, France (2017)
- Festival Photo, La Gacilly, Brittany, France (2017)
- Art/ Afrique, le nouvel atelier, Louis Vuitton Foundation, Paris, France (2017)
- African Passions, Cadaval Palace, Evora, Portugal (2018)
- Making Africa: A Continent of Contemporary Design, Vitra Design Museum, Weil am Rhein, Germany (2019)
- 1.54 Contemporary African Art Fair, Avenue Bad Jdid, Marrakech (2019)
- Radical Revisionists: Contemporary African Artists Confronting Past and Present, Moody Center for the Arts, Houston, Texas (2020)

=== Solo exhibitions ===
- Liberty/ Diaspora, Autograph, London, England (2018)
- Visual Arts Biennal of Mercosul, Santander Cultural, Porto Alegre, Brazil (2018)
- Africa Africa, Palazzo Litta, Milan, Italy (2018)
- A Queen Within Adorned Archetypes, Museum of Pop Culture, Seattle, Washington (2019)
- The Luminous Worlds of Omar Victor Diop, Mariposa Museum & World Culture Center (2022)
- Untitled, Fotografiska Stockholm (2022)
- Untitled, Fotografiska Tallinn (2023)
- Untitled, Fotografiska Berlin (2024)

== Collections ==
Diop's work is held in a number of public collections, including:

- Louis Vuitton Foundation, Paris, France
- Brooklyn Museum, New York, US
- Tang Museum at Skidmore College, New York, US
- Block Museum of Art at Northwestern University, Illinois, US

== Art market ==
Omar Victor Diop is represented by the MAGNIN-A gallery in Paris, and by Elaine Harris with AfricaLive Productions.

== Similar artists ==
- J. D. 'Okhai Ojeikere
- Malick Sidibé
- Samuel Fosso
- Pieter Hugo
- Rotimi Fani-Kayode
- Phumzile Khanyile
- Edson Chagas
- Aida Muluneh
- Leonce Raphael Agbodjelou
- Yinka Shonibare
