= African Art Reframed =

2020 book on African art in museums

African Art Reframed: Reflections and Dialogues on Museum Culture
- Cover
- Author: Bennetta Jules-Rosette; J. R. Osborn (Note: Foreword by Simon Njami)
- Language: English
- Subject: African art, museum studies, cultural studies
- Genre: Non-fiction
- Publisher: University of Illinois Press
- Publication date: June 22, 2020
- Publication place: United States
- Pages: 408
- Awards: Arnold J. Rubin Outstanding Publication Award (2024)
- ISBN: 978-0-252-04327-7 (hardcover) ISBN 978-0-252-08519-2 (paperback)

African Art Reframed: Reflections and Dialogues on Museum Culture is a 2020 book by Bennetta Jules-Rosette and J.R. Osborn documenting how African art has transitioned from being perceived primarily as ethnographic artifacts to becoming recognized as respected works of art within museums. The book introduces a theoretical framework based on five "transformational nodes," describing stages museums typically may have experienced: curiosity cabinets and private collections, small galleries, large modernist institutions, interactive postmodern museums, and digital virtual assemblages.

Jules-Rosette and Osborn use African art as their primary case study but present their nodal model as universally applicable across cultural traditions. The authors also portray museums as dynamic spaces of negotiation, interaction, and dialogue among curators, artists and audiences, underscoring collaborative strategies, curatorial innovation, and digital techniques that challenge traditional museum practices and classifications.

== Authors ==
Bennetta Jules-Rosette is a sociologist and director of the African and African-American Studies Research Center at UC San Diego and J.R. Osborn is a communication scholar and co-director of the Technology Design Studio at Georgetown University.

== Summary ==
Jules-Rosette and Osborn study the transformation of African art from ethnographic artifacts to respected works of art within museum contexts. They present a theoretical framework based on five "transformational nodes" that represent different stages of museum development: the curiosity cabinet and modern private collections, small gallery spaces, large modernist museums with imposing edifices, postmodern interactive museums, and virtual assemblages without physical buildings. According to the authors, museums may transition between these nodes through institutional shifts, and at any given node, they may "atrophy, disrupt, or disappear," leading to alternative configurations. While based on African examples, this nodal model is designed to encompass museums and exhibitions from any cultural tradition.

The book is divided into three main parts with eight chapters, supported by 73 illustrations. Part One traces the historical development of institutions displaying African art, from colonial expositions to contemporary institutions. It analyzes museum classification systems and taxonomies, and critiques the dominance of Western classificatory systems in modernist museums. The authors argue that "the problem of classifying all objects seemingly of one type (i.e., masks) across cultures has the possibility of generating not only mislabeling but also misunderstandings." The section investigates museum storerooms as sites where objects are collected, classified, and restored, describing them as the "unconscious mind" of museums where decisions about display and repatriation are made. Since the 1970s, some museums have deployed openly visible storage areas as a technique to demonstrate their collections' potential and authenticate their displays. This section also examines museum outreach strategies and educational programs, analyzing how museums communicate through their architecture, exhibit strategies, and display techniques.

Part Two presents ethnographic field research consisting of interviews with museum curators, directors, and contemporary African artists. Each chapter concludes with these interviews and provides first-hand perspectives. Notable interviews include Johnetta Betsch Cole (former director of the Smithsonian's National Museum of African Art), Marla Berns (former director of the UCLA Fowler Museum), Khalil Gibran Mohammed (former director of the Schomburg Center for Research in Black Culture), and Simon Njami (independent curator and founding editor of Revue Noire). The authors document curatorial networks and strategies that shape how collections are assembled and exhibitions are mounted, portraying museums as "dialogical spaces" and "ecosystems" or "communities within communities."

The authors note that artists often respond to questions of museum curation and display in their artworks. Notable artists analysed in this regard include: El Hadji Sy, Lusengu (Raphaël) Kalala and the New Figuratism school, Chéri Samba, Koffi Kouakou, Yinka Shonibare MBE, Sokari Douglas Camp, Aïda Muleneh, Jelili Atiku, Habib Koité, and Jean-Baptiste Tiémélé. This section asks "Who speaks for the artists?" and the book promotes examining the works and words of artists themselves as a way of circumnavigating the role of art critics and cultural brokers.

Part Three introduces the concept of "unmixing," described as both a curatorial strategy and digital technology involving "the location and separation of semiotic elements that compose an artwork to enable curatorial contextualization, artistic interpretation, and audience perception." The unmixing method allows audiences to experience artists' creative processes and curators' framing decisions by digitally isolating material elements of artworks, which users can then "select, remove, and remix". The authors tested this method at the Arts Libraries of the University of California, San Diego, where user testing surveys showed enthusiastic responses to its effectiveness as a pedagogical tool. They also applied the method to the Sheldon Art Gallery's 2007 exhibition on Josephine Baker, which drew upon earlier research by Bennetta Jules-Rosette.

The book emphasizes that the reframing of African art is a collective process involving multiple stakeholders: cultural brokers, collectors, curators, critics, publishers, and researchers who provide historical, anthropological, and aesthetic commentaries. Drawing on Howard Becker's concept of art as a "collective activity," the authors depict how aesthetic value emerges through public debate and consensus-building. The work includes a detailed chronological outline mapping significant developments in African art and the museum world, and concludes with nine guideposts for museum practice, including creating transparency in curatorial networks, expanding South-North connections, reworking genre classifications, and developing new learning strategies.

== Reception ==
In a review for Ethnic and Racial Studies, Allison Blakely characterized the book as an anthropological and sociological analysis of museum culture. According to Blakely, the authors addressed a diverse audience, proposing alternative approaches to contextualizing museum displays. Although Blakely appreciated the arguments on technological shifts on museum practices and curation, he questioned several implicit assumptions. In particular, he challenged the notion that curators or artists hold authoritative interpretations of artworks, and expressed concern about whether digital curatorial methods might constrain visitors' personal experiences and interpretations.

J.S. May and Gabriel Apata praised the book for repositioning African art from the realm of primitive ethnographic curiosities to an expression of intrinsic aesthetic worth and cultural significance. They each placed African art within a historical context, acknowledging how colonial influences and Western attitudes that historically diminished its value. May specifically remarked on the tension between artworks on display and those kept in storage, and suggested that both categories continued to bear witness to difficult and intertwined histories.

In her review for the Journal of African American History, Teresa Zimmerman-Liu wrote that the book "can best be described as a tapestry, depicting multinational museum culture. The warp is the authors' nodal taxonomy of museums, and the weft is the volume's depiction of all facets of museum culture". Particularly striking to her were the interviews with curators and artists, which exposed tensions and negotiations behind the displays. She thought the digital "unmixing" method is an effective tool for shifting interpretive authority toward museum audiences.

In her review, Yucheng Liu critically assessed the book as both theoretically rich and practically useful for scholars and professionals seeking new approaches to museum practice. Liu appreciated its theoretical depth, particularly the critique of Western classification systems and the introduction of "nodal theory" as a way to understand institutional change.

The book received the 2024 Arnold J. Rubin Outstanding Publication Award from the Arts Council of the African Studies Association.
