= Kevin Sampson =

Kevin Sampson may refer to:

- Kevin Sampson (American football)
- Kevin Sampson (writer)
- Kevin Sampson (artist) (1954–2026), American artist
