= African Photography Encounters =

Biennial exhibition in Bamako, Mali

African Photography Encounters Rencontres africaines de la photographie
- Genre: Biennale, focus on photography
- Begins: 1994
- Frequency: Biennial, every two years.
- Locations: Bamako, Mali
- Website: www.rencontresbamakophoto.org

African Photography Encounters (French: Rencontres Africaines de la Photographie), more commonly known as Bamako Encounters, is a biennial exhibition in Bamako, Mali, held since 1994. It is the first and largest African photography biennial. The exhibition, featuring exhibits by contemporary African photographers, is spread over several Bamako cultural centers, including the National Museum, the National Library, the Modibo Keïta memorial, and the District Museum. The exhibition also features colloquia and film showings.

It is jointly run by the government of Mali and the Institut Français. It has exhibited work by William Kentridge, Samuel Fosso, Pieter Hugo and Zanele Muholi.

== 2005 – 6th biennial ==
The 6th biennial took place in November and December 2005, with the theme of "Another World." The prizes awarded were:

- The Seydou Keïta prize was awarded to Rana El Nemr (Egypt) for her work on women in the Cairo subway.
- The Coup de coeur Accor prize was awarded to Mamadou Konaté (Mali)
- The Prix AFAA-Afrique en Création was awarded to Fatoumata Diabaté
- The European Union (Best Reporting Photographer) (Prix de l'Union Européenne) was awarded to Zohra Bensemra (Algeria).
- The Intergovernmental Agency of La Francophonie Award (Prix de l'Agence Intergouvernementale de la Francophonie du Meilleur Jeune) (AIF) was awarded to Ulrich-Rodney Mahoungou (Republic of the Congo)
- The Elan de l'Agence Française de Développement prize was awarded to Uche James-Iroha (Nigeria)
- The Special Jury Prize awarded to Mikhael Subotzky (South Africa)

The jury also honoured Ranjith Kally (South Africa) for his life's work.

== 2009 – 8th biennial ==
The biennial included work by Hassan Hajjaj.

The Seydou Keita Prize for Best Photographic Creation was awarded to Uche Okpa-Iroha.

== 2011 – 9th biennial ==
The biennial included work by Philippe Bordas and Omar Victor Diop. The Seydo Keita award was given to Pieter Hugo.

== 2013 ==
The biennial was cancelled because of security concerns.

== 2015 – 10th biennial ==
The 10th biennial took place from 31 October to 31 December 2015 and was themed Telling Time. It was directed by Bisi Silva with associate curators Antawan I. Byrd and Yves Chatap.

The biennial included work by Mallam Mudi Yahaya (For Crown And Country), Mimi Cherono Ng'ok, Moussa Kalapo (La Métaphore du Temps (the metaphor of time)), Lebohang Kganye, Uche Okpa-Iroha, Nyani Quarmyne (a documentary report on Malian refugees in Mauritania), and Nassim Rouchiche (portraits of sub-Saharan migrants stuck in Algeria).

== 2017 – 11th biennial ==
The 11th biennial took place from 2 December 2017 to 31 January 2018.

== 2019 - 12th biennial ==
The 12th biennial took place from 30 November 2019 to the 31st of January 2020. The Artistic director was Bonaventure Soh Bejeng Ndikung with a curatorial team comprising Kwasi Ohene-Ayeh, Aziza Harmel and Astrid Sokona Lepoultier.

The biennial included work by Christian Nyampeta, Rahima Gambo, Abraham Oghobase, Adeola Olagunju, Eric Gyamfi, and Bouchra Khalili

The Seydou Keïta Grand Prize was awarded to Adéọlá Ọlágúnjú.

== 2024 -14th biennial ==
The biennial celebrated thirty years in 2024 with its 14th exhibition which took place between November 16, 2024 and January 16, 2025 under the theme “Kuma, La Parole” (Kuma, the Word). The artistic director was Lassana Igo Diarra accompanied by a curatorial team that included Nadine Hounkpatin, Manthia Diawara, Soufiane Er-Rahoui, Oyindamola (Fakeye) Faithfull and Patrick Mudekereza and the scenographers were Eloisa Ramos and Moreno Castellano.

Maheder Haileselassie Tadesse (Ethiopia) was awarded the Seydou Keita Grand Prize for her series Between Yesterday and Tomorrow; Willow Evann (Côte d’Ivoire/France) received the 2nd prize, the Bisi Silva Award, for his work Les Tirallé; and Victor Adewale (Nigeria) received the 3d place prize for his project Ẹbí Ọlọ́kadà. Seyba Keita (Mali), Dior Thiam (Germany/Senegal), and Hisham Benohoud (Morocco) received honorary mentions.

The 30 artists selected for the 14th Biennale were:

- Victor Adewale (Nigeria)
- Bernard Akoi-Jackson (Ghana)
- Héla Ammar (Tunisia)
- Nabil Boutros (Egypt)
- Cédrick-Isham Calvados (Guadeloupe)
- Caroline Déodat (France/Mauritius)
- Jeannette Ehlers (Denmark/Trinidad and Tobago)
- Willow Evann (France/Côte d’Ivoire)
- Mounir Fatmi (Morocco)
- Ismaël Mahamoudou Laouli Illa (Niger)
- Arnold Tagne Fokam (Cameroon)
- Zara Julius (South Africa)
- Massow Ka (Senegal)
- Kevin Kabambi (DR Congo)
- Seyba Keita (Mali)
- John Kalapo (Mali)
- M’hammed Kilito (Morocco)
- Cynthia R. Matonhodze (Zimbabwe)
- Primo Mauridi (DR Congo)
- Mariam Niaré (Mali)
- Osakpolor Omoregie (Nigeria)
- Amine Oulmakki (Morocco)
- Marc Posso (Gabon)
- Arilal Ophélia Ralamboson (Madagascar)
- Nuno Silas (Mozambique)
- Kanni Sissoko (Mali)
- Yvon Ngassam (Cameroon)
- Maheder Haileselassie Tadese (Ethiopia)
- Dior Thiam (Germany/Senegal)
- Sethembiso Zulu (South Africa)

== See also ==
- Art biennials in Africa
- Addis Foto Fest
- Lagos Photo

== Bibliography ==
- Bajorek, J. and E. Haney (2010), 'Eye on Bamako: Conversations on the African Photography Biennial', Theory, Culture and Society, 27 doi:10.1177/0263276410383718
