= Tonia Nneji =

Nigerian contemporary artist

- Nneji in her Lagos studio in 2022
- Born: Anthonia Chinasa Nneji; 6 December 1992 (age 33); Lagos State, Nigeria
- Education: University of Lagos
- Known for: Painting
- Movement: Contemporary African art
- Awards: Forbes Africa 30 Under 30 (2022)
- Website: tonianneji.com

Tonia Nneji (born Anthonia Chinasa Nneji, 6 December 1992), is a Nigerian contemporary artist. Her paintings and use of textile are predominantly figurative as they look at women's health, illness, and trauma.

== Early life and education ==
Nneji was born in Lagos State, Nigeria. In 2016, she graduated from the University of Lagos with a Bachelor of Arts degree in Visual Arts. In a 2020 interview, she stated her mentor was Nigerian artist Wallace Ejoh.

== Career ==
In 2019, Nneji was one of the six emerging Nigerian artists Rele Arts Foundation's Young Contemporaries exhibition in different media chosen to display their work exploring subjects history, heritage and identity. In 2020, she was included in the Young Contemporaries Alumni Exhibition held at the National Museum, Onikan Lagos. Nneji held her first solo exhibition at the Rele Gallery, Lagos in 2020. Titled "You May Enter", it included paintings depicting vulnerabilities and safe spaces, using bright colors to tell her story in defiance to sadness.

In 2021 Nneji participated in the group exhibitions "Stop, Listen!" at CFHILL, in Stockholm. In 2021 she also took part in "Dancing in Dark Times" at Pippy Houldsworth Gallery, London, portraying the combination of figuration and fabric to address trauma. The same year, she displayed her work in Orita Meta at Rele Gallery in Los Angeles. In 2022 Nneji present her painting at Art Dubai in the fair's Bawwaba section. 2022 also had her work presented by Rele Gallery in the Positions section at Art Basel, Miami Beach, displaying her paintings from her "Uncommon Lands, Common Grounds" series.

In July 2024, she held "When Dusk Falls" a two-person exhibition with Jamie Luoto at the Kristin Hjellegierde, Berlin. The exhibition depicted the medical and sexual trauma within the female body. In 2025, she exhibited at the Musée de l'Homme in Paris and appeared alongside pieces by fellow artist Romuald Hazoumé, photographers Thandiwe Muriu and Omar Victor Diop.

In 2026, Nneji had a solo exhibition at the Rele Gallery in Los Angeles. Titled "Saints of Good Evening Street", it depicted the hardships, exclusions in connection with Goriola Street, Ajegunle, Lagos.

== Exhibitions ==
=== Solo exhibitions ===
- You May Enter, Rele Gallery, Lagos (2020)
- Saints of Good Evening Street, Rele Gallery, Los Angeles (2026)

=== Selected group exhibitions ===
- Dancing in Dark Times, Pippy Houldsworth Gallery, London (2021)
- Orita Meta: Crossroads, Rele Gallery, Los Angeles (2021)
- Stop, Listen, CFHILL, Stockholm (2021)
- When Dusk Falls (with Jamie Luoto), Kristin Hjellegjerde Gallery, Berlin (2024)
- WAX, entre héritage et réappropriation, Musée de l'Homme, Paris (2025)
