= Joana Choumali =

Ivorian photographer (born 1974)

- Born: Joana Choumali; 1974 (age 51–52); Abidjan
- Known for: Photography
- Awards: Fourthwall Book Award, Contemporary African Photography Prize
- Website: joanachoumali.com

Joana Choumali (born 1974) is a freelance photographer based in Abidjan, Côte d'Ivoire. She uses photography to explore issues of identity and the diversity of African cultures.

Her 2014 series, Hââbré, The Last Generation, documents the last generation of scarified Africans.

In 2019, she was awarded the Prix Pictet for her series Ça va aller (It will be OK).

== Life and work ==
Choumali was born and raised in Abidjan. After attending local international schools, she studied Graphic Arts in Casablanca and worked as an art director in an advertising agency before starting her photography career. Her style includes conceptual portraiture, mixed media and documentary. Much of her work focuses on Africa, her assumptions about the diversity of cultures around her, and her expanding conceptions of the world.

As a child, Choumali would travel to Adaou, a small town in the southeast, to visit her grandmother, a farmer and trader. She often felt a cultural disconnect as they did not speak the same language or share life experiences. After her grandmother died in 2001, Choumali lamented losing part of her family history and questioned her identity as an African. This experience inspired her 2014 portrait series, "Resilients", which documents young, professional African women who also struggled with connecting to their family's traditional past. The only requirement was that the women had to wear traditional clothing already worn by their grandmother or an older female relative, emphasizing the link between past and present.

Choumali used to be fascinated seeing people of different social origins proudly displaying their facial scarification across the Ivory Coast, but the practice is dying out. Choumali's 2014 work, Hââbré, the Last Generation, documents the last generation of scarified Africans. “Hââbré” means “writing”, “sign” and “scarification”; this one word signifies all three notions in Kõ, a language from Burkina Faso. Most of the people photographed emigrated from Burkina Faso a long time ago, but the scarification reminds them of their home country and their past. The project gathers their testimonies and looks at their integration into Ivoirian society.

In January 2025, a selection of Choumalis' work went on display at the Harvard Art Museums. Joana Choumali: Languages of West African Marketplaces features twelve hand-quilted and embroidered portraits of Ivory Coast market-goers. The portraits incorporate photographs of individuals, all of whom sport T-shirts bearing English sayings (e.g., "Female Equals Future," "All You Need Is Sparkle," and "Wonder Woman"). The exhibition highlights, among other things, Choumali's exploration of consumer goods (and the paths they take around the world), as well as the "dissonance" between bold, progressive slogans and the wearers' lives.

== Publications ==
- Hââbré, the Last Generation. Fourthwall, 2016. ISBN 978-0-9922404-9-3. With an essay by Azu Nwagbogu.
- Bitter Chocolate Stories. Netherlands: Paradox, 2017. By Choumali and Marijn Heemskerk.

== Exhibitions ==
- Hââbré, the Last Generation, Photoquai Biennale, "We are family" Quai Branly Museum, and Eiffel Tower, Paris, 2015
- Résilientes, Photolux Festival, Sacro e profano, Lucca, Italy, 2015
- Hââbré, the Last Generation, solo exhibition, 50 Golborne Gallery, London, 2016
- Rencontres de Bamako festival, Bamako, Mali, 2017
- Joana Choumali: Languages of West African Marketplaces, Harvard Art Museums, 2025

== Awards ==
- 2014: LensCulture Emerging Talents Awards, for Hââbré, the Last Generation
- 2014: Contemporary African Photography Prize, for Hââbré, the Last Generation
- 2016: Magnum Foundation Emergency Fund, for the series "Sissi Barra"
- 2016: Fourthwall book Award, for Hââbré, the Last Generation
- 2019: Prix Pictet, for her series Ça va aller (It will be OK)
