= Art biennials in Africa =

The worldwide enthusiasm for art biennials, triennials and other –ennial events rose during the 1990s and is continuing whereas this kind of exhibition format is not a new trend. Indeed, the Venice Biennale was founded in 1895, followed in 1896 by Carnegie International, the Bienal de São Paulo in 1951, Kassel's Documenta in 1955 and the Biennale of Sydney in 1973, just to name the firsts, mostly driven by capitalist-philanthropic spirit.

This enthusiasm, which almost no country is exempted from (Dominique Malaquais points out that biennials are the new stadiums countries need to have in order to gain respect on the international arena), is the result of the correlation of three factors in the post-Cold War context that, accordingly to Bruce Ferguson, Reesa Greenberg and Sandy Nairne, can be identified as the worldwide development of the art market, the promotion of the arts as a support of cultural and national identity and the idea that art, seen as a universal language, is an instrument of exchange. Art biennials are also often the best idea for international exposure when a State cannot afford a national art museum and support local artists as Charlotte Bydler underlined it.

Each biennial has its own specificity and history. There is not one model as such, but one common point is that art biennials are first and foremost political events. They are often the cultural response to a national will to favor cultural tourism, to solve a social or identity issue, to legitimize an economic boom or to encourage a process of urban innovation.

Biennials are also tremendous observatories of globalization processes. By promoting a certain locality and at the same time benefitting from global interests, they favor the globalization paradox, which often creates great tensions on a local level.

Biennials from the so-called 'peripheral' countries aspire to become other potential centers and to decentralize what was concentrated upon a Euro-American axis until the end of the Cold War. The African continent is no exception and countries started to organize art biennials (besides pan-African festivals which are not included in this account) since the 1950s. Nonetheless, the 1990s, a moment of geopolitical shifts both inside (e.g. the demise of apartheid in South Africa) and outside (e.g. the fall of the Iron Curtain in Europe) the continent, leading to political reorganization, the change of cultural politics and economics as well as urban renewal, were really the decade when art biennials started to be seen as the best 'invention' to promote local art and reach a global audience.

== History ==
Egypt was the first country on the African continent to use the art biennial format as a political tool for national promotion, long before art biennials became a trend in the 1990s and dawned all over the continent, especially since the beginning of the 21st century. The Alexandria Biennale for Mediterranean Countries was founded in 1955 and celebrated its 26th edition in 2016, as for the Cairo International Biennale, it was created in 1984 and organized its last edition in 2012. Initially devoted to Arab contemporary art, Cairo opened up to the international scene from its 1986's edition. But while Egypt was a precursor, its biennials are less known abroad than other ones held on the continent. This situation can be explained by the provincial focus (despite the international openness of the Cairo biennial) and classical style of the two events (built on the Venice Biennale model of national pavilions), combined to the fact that they are state-run events, locked in a national paradigm and with barely any communication tools (neither of them has an official website). Recently, in November 2015, Something Else OFF Biennale Cairo, an artist-run initiative, came into being in order to promote the Egyptian contemporary art scene that is mostly excluded from the Alexandria and Cairo events. The very name of this independent biennial says clearly that its aim is to take a step back from the establishment and give an alternative view of the Egyptian creation.

One common preconception on African art biennials is to situate the Dakar Biennale or Dak'art as the first sub-Saharan art biennial whereas it was preceded by the Biennale d'art bantou contemporain (or Biennial of Contemporary Bantu Art), founded in 1985. The latter is less covered abroad than DAK'ART, and it lasted for only seven editions (the last one being in 2002). The originality of the project is its creation as part of a more ambitious cultural project initiated by Gabonese President Omar Bongo in 1982: the CICIBA (International Centre of Bantu Civilizations), an intergovernmental project which aimed at preserving and promoting Bantu cultures, seen by the organizers as sharing a homogeneous cultural base whereas they were at that time estimated to represent more than 150 million people dispersed among more than twenty countries. Therefore, the biennial was conceived as an itinerant event. The countries alternated in hosting each edition but each edition also travelled, giving thus a broader visibility to the artists. But this focus on the Bantu roots, leading to a selection exclusively centered on artists creating and living on what was defined by the organizers as the Bantu 'territory' as well as favoring painting and sculpture over new media, is probably one of the reasons why the event did not reach an international audience and remained a regional biennial.

The Dakar Biennale (or DAK'ART) is undoubtedly the most famous of all African based biennials. It was founded in 1990, as the legacy of the Pan-African Festival mondial des arts nègres, which died out in the 1980s before being resuscitated in Dakar in 2010. Celebrating the heritage of Léopold Sedar Senghor's cultural politics, DAK'ART was initially conceived as a cultural event alternating every two years between poetry/literature and contemporary art. However, the 1990 edition would remain the only one devoted to literature. At its first occurrence in 1992, the art event had an international scope but it was refocused on the African continent from its next edition in 1994. One of the particularities of DAK'ART is its "off" event that spreads out from the official Biennale venues into various locations in the city. Even if the off was founded by the biennale's administration and not by an external association, it is considered by many as the core of the biennial, giving an extra-space of visibility to the dynamism and richness of African artistic creation, and particularly to promote the Senegalese artists who are not selected in the official exhibitions.^{8} Indeed, the selection process is an open call, which has been criticized by many artists who wish a more curated event, because in their view the open call is not democratic as it claims to be, but favors those who have access to relevant information and the means to set up an application file.^{9} Each edition is different from the previous one, each learning from the criticism that was made through evaluation seminars. For example, since 2006, an artistic director is appointed and collaborates with a group of curators to select the artists.

== Biennale de Bamako ==
The Rencontres de la photographie africaine or Biennale de Bamako, also known as the Bamako Encounters, is also one of the oldest art biennials on the continent (founded in 1993). It is still active today and has acquired an international reputation across and outside the continent.^{10} Its specificity is its focus on photography and video in Africa. Unlike the events aforementioned, the Biennale de Bamako has been driven and organized from its beginnings by the French cultural exchange agency Institut français (formerly AFAA, cultural branch of the French Ministry of Foreign Affairs), in cooperation with the Ministry of Culture in Mali. Therefore, curator Simon Njami qualifies the Biennale de Bamako as a "transplanted" event, which required work on a local scale to legitimize the biennial that could first be seen as a neocolonial event serving foreign purposes.^{11} It certainly succeeded to gain a local as well as an international renown because it boosted the creation of photography based festivals such as the PhotoFesta Maputo (2002)^{12}, the Gwanza Month of Photography (2009)^{13}, or the Lagos Photo Festival (2010)^{14} just to name a few.

== Johannesburg Biennale ==
Founded to celebrate the end of Apartheid and the reopening of the country to the world after decades of boycott, the Johannesburg Biennale, despite its short life (only two editions: Africus in 1995 and Trade Routes in 1997), is one of the best examples of the fundamental tension into which biennials are caught: to settle into the local and to gain renown on an international level. If for curator Hans Ulrich Obrist the 1997 Johannesburg Biennale was as important as the Venice Biennale or documenta X held the same year, and was amongst the most influential exhibitions of the 1990s, ^{15} the local reception of the event was in general radically different. Its absence of engagement with the South African communities and the conceptual and elitist character of the exhibited artworks were harshly criticized in the local press. The biennial was thus seen as a grafted event, serving political interests rather than social and cultural ones, and favoring an international art discourse over a local one. In the case of the Johannesburg Biennale this criticism was one of the pretexts of the Greater Johannesburg City Council to withdraw its support and shut down the event prematurely. Even though the reasons for its cancellation are still not fully elucidated, the Johannesburg Biennale remains nonetheless a mythical biennial because, after decades of isolation due to international boycott, it shed light on the South African art scene and helped many South Africans artists to access the international arena where they are occupying a significant place nowadays.^{16}

== Additional biennials ==
Since the beginning of the 21st century, at least seventeen art biennials popped up on the African continent (see end list). ^{17} The great difference with the 20th century is that almost all of these biennials are independent initiatives led by artists and non-profit organizations, i.e. East Africa Art Biennale, Salon Urbain de Douala, AFiRIperFOMA Biennial, Kampala Art Biennale or Rencontres Picha/Biennale de Lubumbashi. Some areas stand out as active artistic centers like Douala (Biennale de Douala DUTA, Salon Urbain de Douala), Morocco (with Casablanca and Marrakech Biennales), Lagos Biennial, Congo (Biennale de Lubumbashi, Yango Biennale) or the city of Kampala (KLA ART, Kampala Art Biennale). Even if some of these biennials are irregularly organized or even abandoned, they are nonetheless symptoms of a cultural effervescence and a will to promote and encourage local artists, be it on a regional level or on a more international one.

The creation of a biennial not only proceeds from a political motivation, but it also depends on the capacity of the city to host the public. The existence of communication, transport and accommodation infrastructures is necessary and their absence thus requires a consequent budget to build and/or renovate them, which can be a problem for a city/country that does not have the resources to do so. To be accepted at a local level, that is to say, to have the support of the city council or the State, is a sine qua non condition to ensure longevity and financial stability to the biennial. For example, the disengagement of the Greater Johannesburg City Council in the Johannesburg biennale's project marked the end of the event. Nonetheless, it does not prevent independent, non-governmental, biennials to exist too. Only the future will tell if private investors will sustain such events on a regular basis for as long as the city of Venice or the State of Senegal have done so far. One aspect also very important to keep in mind is the fact that biennials are just events, even when they are institutionalized like DAK'ART or the Biennale de Bamako. Therefore, they must be seen as steps towards the establishment of sustainable structures to support and promote local artists on a daily basis.

The opening to the international art arena brought by a biennale is an essential dimension, which pertains then to the location's inscription (be it a city or a country) on the map both of the art world and of financial investors, attracted by the tourism engendered by the event. To legitimize an art biennial at the international level requires most of the time the invitation of an international curator as artistic director. For example, the Benin Biennial, which was initially conceived in 2010 as a local event to celebrate the 50th anniversary of the independence of the country, appointed a renowned curator, Abdellah Karroum, for the next edition (2012) in order to change its status of a local event into an international one. The organizers of the Marrakech Biennale also knew it well when they appended the "biennial" label on what was at first a local event (The Arts in Marrakech Festival) in order to reach a wider audience without losing the local one, notably by keeping the use of three languages (Arabic, French and English).

Art biennials in Africa are important exponents of the increasing internationalization of contemporary African artists.^{18} But one of the pitfalls of this kind of event is the risk of becoming an exotic storefront for Western art critics and curators.^{19} Therefore, a real curatorial work has to be done to escape the submission to Western diktat. At the same time, by changing the traditional trajectories of the art world, those biennials force Western institutions to renew themselves, for example by appointing Okwui Enwezor to Documenta11 (2001–2002) or, more recently, to the 56th Venice Biennale's (2015) artistic direction. Enwezor is the first and, so far the only, African and Black person to have directed Documenta or the Venice Biennale.

== See also ==
- Addis Foto Fest
- World Festival of Black Arts
