= Ramos Castellano Arquitectos =

- Founded: 2005
- Type: architecture firm
- Headquarters: Mindelo, Cape Verde

Ramos Castellano Arquitectos is an architecture firm led by Eloisa Ramos and Moreno Castellano, founded in 2005 and based in Mindelo, a city in São Vicente island. They have gained international recognition for their commitment to sustainability and local craftsmanship, being one of the main architectural studios in Africa having multiple articles written on their works, most notably the recent Centro Nacional de Artesanato e Design building in Mindelo. Their architectural style is known for recycling materials and using sustainable construction techniques.

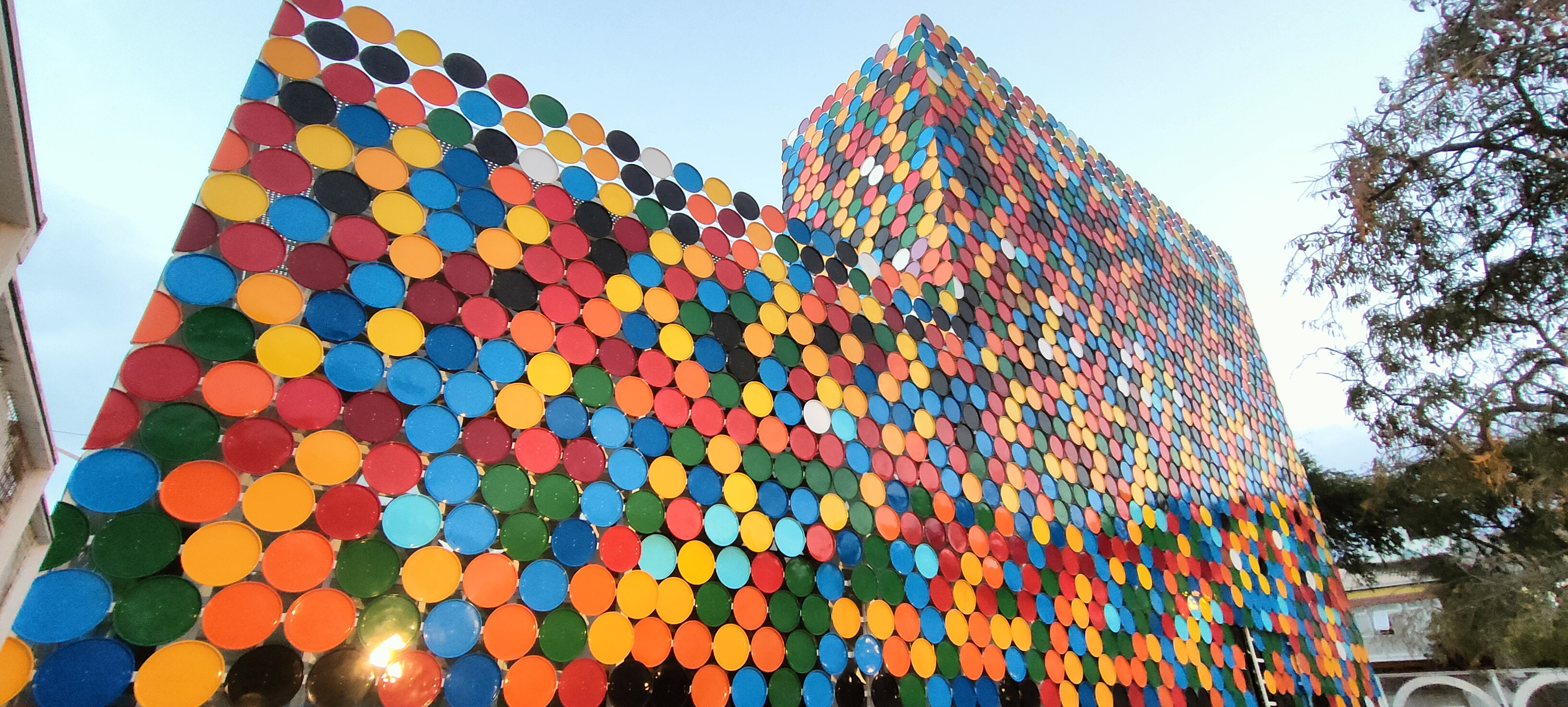
The CNAD, Centro Nacional de Artesanato e Design, in Mindelo

== Biography ==
Eloisa Ramos, born on Santo Antão island, completed her studies on the University of Coimbra in 2002. Moreno Castellano, born in Sardinia, then naturalized capeverdean finished his studies in 2003 in the University of Florence. The studio was established in 2005 by both together. Their practice came from a common vision and wish to address the logistical and climatic challenges of the archipelago by creating innovative concepts with local know-how

== Works ==
The studio's style is often defined by sustainability (ie. their natural ventilation systems and thermal insulation adapted to the islands' climate), material upcycling integrating and re-using previously discarded materials (notably oil barrel lids) due to the lack of resources in the islands and community engagement, working along with local artisans contributing to the local circular economy, using refined techniques by local artisans, using manual construction techniques in spite of heavy machinery. Their notable works include:

- Aquiles Eco-Hotel (São Pedro, Cape Verde, completed in 2014)
- Terra Lodge (Mindelo, Cape Verde, completed in 2015)
- Casa Celestina (Mindelo, Cape Verde, completed in 2021)
- Centro Nacional de Artesanato e Design (Mindelo, Cape Verde, completed in 2022)
- Mami Wata Eco Village (Chã de Igreja, Cape Verde, completed in 2023)
- "Rencontres de Bamako", 14th edition of the African Photography Encounters (Bamako, Mali, scenography, 2024)

== Awards ==
- Prémio Nacional da Arquitectura de Cabo Verde
- IFI Design distinction award
- Dedalo Minosse International Prize for Commissioned Buildings 2024/2025
