= Ranjith Kally =

South African photojournalist (1925–2017)

- Born: 26 November 1925; Durban, South Africa
- Died: 6 June 2017 (aged 91); Johannesburg, South Africa
- Occupation: Photojournalist
- Years active: 1956–2017

Ranjith Kally (26 November 1925 – 6 June 2017) was a South African photojournalist. He is best known for his apartheid-era photographs of black and Indian communities in Durban, which he covered for Drum Magazine between 1956 and 1985.

== Life and career ==
Kally was born on 26 November 1925 in Reunion, a village in Isipingo on the outskirts of Durban. He was descended from indentured Indian labourers; his father and grandfather were both foremen in the nearby sugarcane fields. He left school after Standard Six, aged 14, to begin work at the R. Faulks & Company shoe factory on Gale Street, Durban, and he worked there for the next 15 years. During that period, when he was 21, he bought a Kodak Postcard camera for sixpence at a jumble sale in Isipingo; he taught himself to take photographs, using magazines from the Royal Photographic Society, and began to supplement his income with freelance work, photographing weekend social events for The Leader, a Durban-based newspaper.

In 1956, Kally became a full-time professional photographer. From 1956 to 1985, excepting a three-year hiatus between 1965 and 1968, he was on the staff at the Golden City Post and Drum; those sister publications printed many of his most famous photographs, primarily taken in the Indian and Black townships around Durban. In addition to his photos of the Durban social scene, he became especially renowned for portraiture and photographed many anti-apartheid activists, including Monty Naicker and Nelson Mandela (at the Rivonia Trial), Alan Paton, Oliver Tambo, and Albert Luthuli. His 1960 portraits of Luthuli, taken during Luthuli's house arrest in Groutville, were circulated internationally after Luthuli won the Nobel Peace Prize, and Kally later said that they were the highlight of his career. In the 1980s he was retrenched from Drum and entered semi-retirement, doing occasional freelance work for private clients and local newspapers including the Sunday Tribune.

== Exhibitions and books ==
His work was included in group exhibitions at the Guggenheim Museum in New York in 1996 and the Midland Arts Centre in Birmingham in 1995. However, he had little fame in South Africa until 2004, when, aged 79, he had his first solo exhibition at the Goodman Gallery in Johannesburg, entitled Ranjith Kally: 60 Years in Black and White. A solo retrospective exhibition was launched at the Durban Art Gallery later that year and was subsequently shown at African Photography Encounters, where Kally earned the Lifetime Achievement Award, as well as at the Kunsthalle Wien in Vienna, the Centre de Cultura Contemporània in Barcelona, and Espace Jeumon in Réunion.

Memory Against Forgetting, a collection of Kally's photographs taking its name from a Milan Kundera quotation, was published by Quivertree in 2014. Reviewing the collected images for the Mail & Guardian, David Goldblatt said that they "tell unerringly of our obscenely layered life."

== Honours ==
Kally was admitted to the Royal Photographic Society in 1967. In April 2013, the University of KwaZulu-Natal awarded him an honorary Doctor of Literature.

== Personal life and death ==
Kally married Leela Harripersadh, the sister of his colleague, reporter Bobby Harripersadh. He died on 6 June 2017, aged 91, after a short illness. At the time of his death, he was visiting his daughter, Jyoti Michael, in Johannesburg, while residing in Durban with his other daughter, Pavitra Pillay. His funeral was held in Reservoir Hills.
