= Oyindamola Fakeye =

- Education: University of Nottingham
- Occupation: Curator

Oyindamola Fakeye is a Nigerian creative director at the Centre for Contemporary Art, Lagos. She is the curator of the Àsìkò Art School. and currently the company director for Res Artis.

== Life and career ==
Fakeye graduated from University of Nottingham. She co-founded and directs Video Art Network, in Lagos. with Emeka Ogboh and Jude Anogwih. Fakeye is on the Panel of Judges for the 2023 Contemporary African Photography Prize.

== Workshops ==
- ‘Party Games’ 2014
- David Dale Gallery, Glasgow 2014
- WHO IS WEARING MY T-SHIRT, Lagos, 2010
