= DLO Energy Resources Group =

South African energy provider

DLO Energy Resources Group (PTY) LTD
- Type: Private
- Industry: Energy
- Founded: 01 June 2011; 15 years ago
- Founder: Linda Mabhena-Olagunju
- Headquarters: Johannesburg, South Africa
- Area served: South Africa
- Key people: CEO: Linda Mabhena-Olagunju
- Products: Renewable energy Solar power Wind power
- Owner: Linda Mabhena-Olagunju (Majority)
- Website: dloenergygroup.com

DLO Energy Resources Group (PTY) LTD is an independent power producer headquartered in Johannesburg, South Africa with primary operations in renewable energy, solar power and wind power.

Established in 2011, the company currently oversees one of Africa’s largest wind farms located in the Northern Cape of South Africa; powering approximately 160,000 homes with carbon free solar power.

As of 2021, DLO Energy Resources Group has operations in two countries, including South Africa and Nigeria.

== History ==
DLO Energy Resources group was founded by Linda Mabhena-Olagunju in 2011 and at the time was one of only two independent power producers (IPP) to be wholly owned by a black female in South Africa. The company has won multiple development bids through South Africa’s Renewable Energy Independent Power Producer Procurement Programme (REIPPPP). In addition to South Africa, the company has projects under development in Nigeria and Botswana.

In 2019, DLO Energy Resources Group was selected to build and oversee a 30 MW solar park in Kaduna State, Nigeria. An agreement for the project was signed by Kaduna State Governor Nasir Ahmad el-Rufai and the company's founder, Linda Mabhena-Olagunju.

In 2020, DLO Energy Resources Group led a group donation totaling R600,000 to the National School of the Arts (NSA) located in Johannesburg, South Africa. The donation was an effort to pay student fees and help students facing financial challenges due to Covid-19.

== Acquisition ==
The company announced the acquisition of Conco Energy Solutions in July 2021, becoming a level 1 BBBEE contributor and expanding its expertise in the EPC and O&M sector. Following the acquisition, the company also announced it will rebrand to DLO Energy Solutions.

== Operations ==
The company currently oversees two renewable energy projects in South Africa. Both projects were won under round 3 of South Africa’s Renewable Energy Independent Power Producer Programme with multiple others in development, including an off-grid solar PV plant in Northern Nigeria.

=== Wind Power ===
- LONGYUAN MULILO DE AAR WIND POWER - 15 km South-West of De Aar, Northern Cape, South Africa
- LONGYUAN MULILO DE AAR 2 NORTH - De Aar, Northern Cape, South Africa

=== Solar Power ===
- DU PLESSIS SOLAR PV4 - South Africa
- KADUNDA SOLAR PV - Kaduna, Nigeria
