= Adéọlá Ọlágúnjú =

Nigerian visual artist

- Born: Nigeria
- Other name: Adeola Olagunju
- Education: Ladoke Akintola University of Technology; Folkwang University of the Arts
- Awards: Lagos Photo Festival Award; Seydou Keïta Prize (African Photography Encounters Bamako Biennial 2019)
- Website: adeolaolagunju.com

Adéọlá Ọlágúnjú is a Nigerian visual artist working with photography, video, sound and installations.

== Early life and education ==
Adéọlá Ọlágúnjú grew up in Nigeria during the era of military dictatorship – a tumultuous period that influenced her future work by teaching her, in her own words, that "rebirth comes with chaos, confusion, and destruction". Adéọlá Ọlágúnjú attended the Ladoke Akintola University of Technology in Ogbomosho, Nigeria, where she graduated in 2009 with a bachelor's degree in Fine and Applied Arts. In 2021, she earned a master's degree in Photography Studies and Practice at the Folkwang University of the Arts in Essen, Germany.

== Exhibitions ==
Ọlágúnjú's work has been exhibited at galleries and museums including Palais des Beaux-Arts de Bruxelles, Bonhams in London, Rencontres d'Arles, Lagos Biennial, Arti et Amicitiae, Amsterdam Palais de Tokyo Paris, African Photography Encounters, Musée d'Art Moderne de Paris, and Galerie In Situ, Paris.

== Publications with contributions by Ọlágúnjú ==
- Africa Under the Prism: Contemporary African Photography from LagosPhoto Festival. Hatje Cantz, 2015. With texts by Chimamanda Adichie.
- The Art of Nigerian Women. Ben Bosah, 2017. ISBN 978-0-9969084-5-0.
- A Stranger's Pose. Cassava Republic, 2018. By Emmanuel Iduma. ISBN 978-1-911115-49-6.
- The Journey: New Positions in African Photography. Kerber, 2020. Edited by Simon Njami and Sean O'Toole. ISBN 978-3-7356-0682-2.

== Awards ==
- 2012: Lagos Photo Festival Award
- 2019: Seydou Keïta Grand Prize Award "Best photographic creation" at the Bamako Encounters International Biennial for Photography

== See also ==
- List of Nigerian women artists
