= Mariposa Museum & World Culture Center =

Art museum in Peterborough, New Hampshire

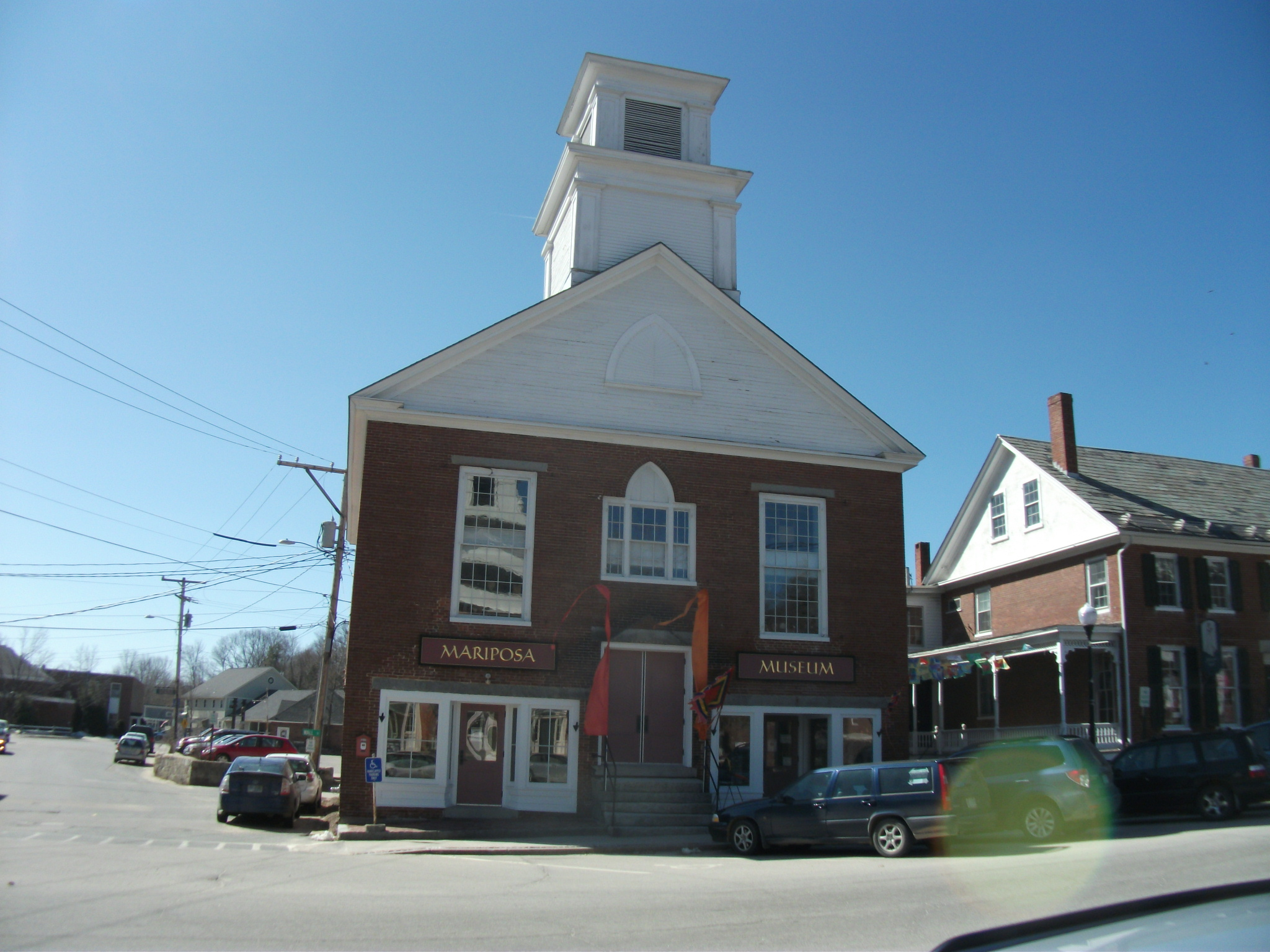

- Location within New Hampshire
- Established: 2002
- Location: Peterborough, New Hampshire, U.S.
- Coordinates: 42.877312°N 71.949559°W
- Founders: David Blair; Linda Marsella
- Website: www.mariposamuseum.org

The Mariposa Museum & World Culture Center is a museum in Peterborough, New Hampshire, United States. It was founded in 2002, by husband-and-wife team David Blair and Linda Marsella to improve awareness and understanding across cultural boundaries. The Mariposa was designed as a "hands-on" museum and is located in Peterborough's Baptist Church building (1841), which was added to the New Hampshire State Register of Historic Places in 2011.

In 2019, the Mariposa expanded its mission and opened the Mariposa Museum in Oak Bluffs in Oak Bluffs, Massachusetts to showcase the work and scholarship of African-American artists. The Mariposa Museum in Oak Bluffs is Martha’s Vineyard’s only museum dedicated to African-American artists.

== Attendance ==
It is estimated that 6,000 visitors attended the Mariposa Museum in Oak Bluffs' first exhibit, And Still We Rise, in the summer of 2019.

== Selected exhibitions ==
- And Still We Rise: Race, Culture and Visual Conversations. Women of Color Quilter’s Network. 2019.
- Freedom Songs!, Kevin Sampson. 2020.
- Angels of 17 Years Boy, Imo Nse Imeh. 2021.
- Block Prints of Black American Spirituals, Ashley Bryan. 2021.
- Clarion Call, Danny Simmons. 2021.
- Make Something Beautiful, Kevin Sampson and Danny Simmons. 2021.
- The Luminous Worlds of Omar Victor Diop, Omar Victor Diop. 2022.
- Stitching Time: The Social Justice Collaborative Quilts Project. 2023. The Social Justice Quilts Project is curated by "outside" quilter Maureen Kelleher and "inside" quilter Kenya Baleech Alkebu, who is incarcerated at Angola Prison, Louisiana State Penitentiary.
- Progeny. Stone carvings of African master sculptors. 2024.
- Seasons on the Vine, featuring the art of 109-year old Dorothy Burnham, Paloma Hostin, Martha Mae Jones, and Suesan Stovall. This exhibit represented four generations of Black women with ties to Martha's Vineyard. 2024.
