= Samuel Fosso =

Cameroonian-born Nigerian photographer

- Born: 1962 (age 63–64); Kumba, Cameroon
- Occupation: Photographer

Samuel Fosso (born 1962) is a Cameroonian-born Nigerian photographer who has worked for most of his career in the Central African Republic. His work includes using self-portraits adopting a series of personas, often commenting on the history of Africa. One of his most famous works of art, and what he is best known for, is his "autoportraits" where he takes either himself or other more recognizable people and draws them in a style of popular culture or politics. He is recognized as one of Central Africa's leading contemporary artists.

He won the Prince Claus Award from the Netherlands in 2001 and the Deutsche Börse Photography Foundation Prize in 2023.

== Early life ==
Fosso was born in Kumba, Cameroon, to Nigerian parents. He grew up in Afikpo, his ancestral home, until he had to flee to Bangui in the Central African Republic at the age of thirteen in 1972 in the wake of the Nigerian Civil War.

== Career ==
In Bangui he began to work as an assistant photographer when he was twelve, and a year later as a portrait photographer with his own studio in Bangui, 'Studio Photo Nationale'. Initially he made self-portraits to fill up the unused parts of his photographic films. These photographs were destined for his mother, who had stayed behind in Nigeria. The making of self-portraits became an objective on its own for him.

As a teenager working in the studio Fosso would often take colorful self portraits in between client photo shoots. His work was discovered by a collection of African intellectuals and writers including Okwui Enwezor and Iké Udé, bringing Fosso into a more active role in the art community for his adult career.

In 1994 Fosso became known abroad when he won the first edition of African Photography Encounters in Bamako, Mali.

Fosso explores the idea of self-presentation and gender representation, experimenting with props, costumes, and poses in flamboyant 1970s fashion. For his self-portraits he used a delayed shutter release allowing Fosso up to ten seconds to pose for each photograph. He often used cloth backgrounds, in front of which he dressed up in costumes that varied greatly: authentic European costumes, African folk costumes, navy uniforms, karate keikogis, boxer shorts, and so on.

He has portrayed Angela Davis, Malcolm X, Muhammad Ali, Nelson Mandela, Martin Luther King Jr. and other black iconic figures. In his series African Spirits, Fosso conveys empowerment and the art of storytelling through his self portraits of celebrated black figures.

On February 5, 2014, amidst looting after sectarian violence, Fosso's home studio in Bangui, containing his complete archive, was ransacked. This was discovered by chance by photojournalist Jerome Delay, who, along with fellow photojournalist Marcus Bleasdale, and Peter Bouckaert (Emergency Director at Human Rights Watch), rescued the majority of its contents, estimated at 20,000 negatives and 150 to 200 prints, though Fosso's cameras were stolen. Fosso was in Paris at the time.

Fosso's work was included in the 2025 exhibition Photography and the Black Arts Movement, 1955–1985 at the National Gallery of Art.

=== The Tati Series ===
The Tati Series (1997) is one of Fasso's first performative oeuvre or works, in which he works with color. Originally the Tati Series was meant to be in black and white as was traditional in West African studio photography, for a brand that invited Fasso and two other photographers. He refused the initial project, making The Tati Series color portraits rather than in black and white. In this 1997 series, Fasso uses bold colors and flamboyant fabrics while dressing up as various cliche personas. The cliche personas consist of the liberated American housewife, the pirate, the famous African chief, or the overly coiffed bourgeois woman. The Tati Series evokes a clash of costumes and cultures in the colonial experience. Its message was about segregation, slavery, and a demand for independence and freedom.

=== The Chief: He Who Sold Africa To The Colonists ===
In 1997, Fosso released his work The Chief: He Who Sold Africa To The Colonists , which would quickly become one of his most iconic works. In it he depicts himself as a decorated chief, covered in leopard skins, a plethora of gold necklaces and coral beads tangled around his neck, dense gold bracelets and heavy gold rings around his hands and fingers. In his right hand he holds a thick bouquet of gigantic sunflowers. His feet rest bare on a printed mat with a pair of red leather boots beside them. In the self-portrait Fosso conceptualizes the idea of Africa having been sold through the use of historical caricatures of these authoritative figures who committed the violence of selling their own people and resources for personal gain. Fosso himself confirms this in an interview with Guardian correspondent Jon Henley. Fosso shares that in the photo he portrays himself as all the African chiefs who have sold their Africa to White men. He says that Africa had her own systems and rulers before the White man arrived, and the portrait is both about the history of the White and Black men in Africa; although they may try to cover it up, underneath it is still all the same.

=== African Spirits ===
In 2008, he unveiled one of his most celebrated works, “African Spirits”. Fosso's theatrical self portraits pay tribute to fourteen political, intellectual, and cultural figures from Pan-African historical movements and the U.S. Civil Rights Movement. The photographs are made of gelatin silver print mounted on dibond and sized 162.8 by 122 centimeters. Fosso unveiled African Spirits during the election of the first black president, Barack Obama. This was an important landmark in U.S. History, further expanding Fosso's message of black empowerment and the celebration of black history.

Influenced by his Igbo heritage and Igbo performance traditions of masquerade and body art, Fosso utilizes the concept of the “living dead” in African Spirits, the idea that the spirit of those before us remain close to the living.

In an article from African contemporary publisher Revue Noire, editor Simon Njami reflects upon African Spirits, “Fosso has disappeared entirely… The bodies that we see represented are no longer his but those of people he impersonates.” For example, in his portrait of Angela Davis, Fosso is costumed in Davis' iconic afro hairstyle and fashion transforming himself into a 1970s political activist. This concept of theatrical mimicry gives empowerment to the people he embodies and the ideals they stood for.

Fosso was inspired by photographs of Even Arnold and Malcolm X, mimicking their portraits in great detail and transforming into the icons of black history. In his photographs is the recurring theme of storytelling, the performative impersonation of another person or idea. Through storytelling, Fosso is empowering and reclaiming the identity of himself, his subject, and his audience.

Steven Nelson comments on the glamorous and nostalgic theme Fosso adopts after African Independence, the Civil Rights Movement and the rise of Black Nationalism in the 1960s and 1970s. “African Spirits points to an exploration of Pan-Africanist identity grounded in the political ideals of the 1960s, which stressed a shared politics of struggle for black people worldwide.” Fosso's famous self portraits celebrate and challenge concepts of Pan-African identity.

=== The Emperor of Africa ===
In 2013, Fosso unveiled his new series, The Emperor of Africa. In this series, Fosso “explores the relationship between Africa and China by recontextualizing icons of Mao Zedong”. Like many other self-portraits in The Emperor of Africa, the self-portrait of Fosso as Mao Zedong is seen as a reflection Mao Zedong's image, as well as a symbol of the economic interests Africa had with China. In Gabriel García Márquez's novel, Autumn of the Patriarch, she describes Fosso's Mao Zedong Portrait as an “ancestral figure and absent dictator” . Fosso not only portrays Mao Zedong as a liberator who is well-admired in Africa, but also as a founder “of a modern imperial behemoth” of China's growing economy and cultural presence that is embraced throughout Africa.

== Photographic style ==
Fosso's style is somewhat comparable with that of Diane Arbus, in that his self-portraits show a glimpse of our own humanity. Arbus's photography has been said to show that everyone has their own identity, that is to say what remains when we take away the rest. In contrast Fosso's varying costumes are said to show that identity is determined partly as well by things over which humans lack control. His work has therefore also been characterized as having a disclosure of how humans can in fact create their own identity.

== Awards ==
- 1994: 1st Prize, African Photography Encounters (Rencontres de la Photographie), Bamako, Mali
- 1995: Prix Afrique en Creations
- 2000: First Prize, photography category, Dak'Art – Biennale de l'Art Africain Contemporain, Dakar, Sénégal
- 2001: Prince Claus Award, Netherlands
- 2010: 1st Prize in Visual Arts Prins Bernhard Cultuurfonds
- 2023: Deutsche Börse Photography Foundation Prize for his exhibition Samuel Fosso at the Maison européenne de la photographie

== Publications ==
- Samuel Fosso. Seydou Keita. Malick Sidibe. Portraits of Pride. West African Portrait Photography. Raster Forlag, 2003. ISBN 978-9171006776.
- Maria Francesca and Guido Schlinkert. Samuel Fosso. 5Continents, 2008. ISBN 978-8874391011.
- Simon Njami and Samuel Fosso. Samuel Fosso – PHotoBolsillo International, Revue Noire, 2011. ISBN 978-8492841622.

== Collections ==
Fosso's work is held in the following public collections:

- Museum of Modern Art, New York: 14 prints (as of September 2018)
- Purdy Hicks Gallery, London: 15 prints
- The Museum of Fine Arts, Houston: 7 prints (as of June 2020)
- Tate, London: 25 prints
