= Maheder Haileselassie =

Etiyopya'lı sanatçı, fotoğrafçı

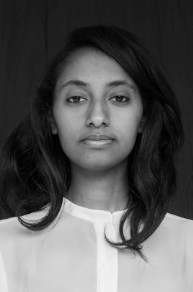
- Self-portrait
- Born: 1990 (age 35–36); Addis Ababa, Ethiopia
- Known for: Leading photographer and artist

Maheder Haileselassie Tadese (born 1990) is an Ethiopian artist and photographer.

== Life ==
Haileselassie was born and raised in Addis Ababa in 1990. She studied civil engineering at the university. Her interest became photography in the final year of her study and by 2013 her primary interest was photography.

She runs the Center for Photography to encourage younger photographers in Ethiopia. She has criticised the work of photographer Mahesh Shantaram who has tried to document the effect of colonialism, but she finds his work problematic as she feels that he creates poses that are for the pleasure of the viewer. She thinks this is a colonial view where women are needlessly naked to fascinate a western audience.

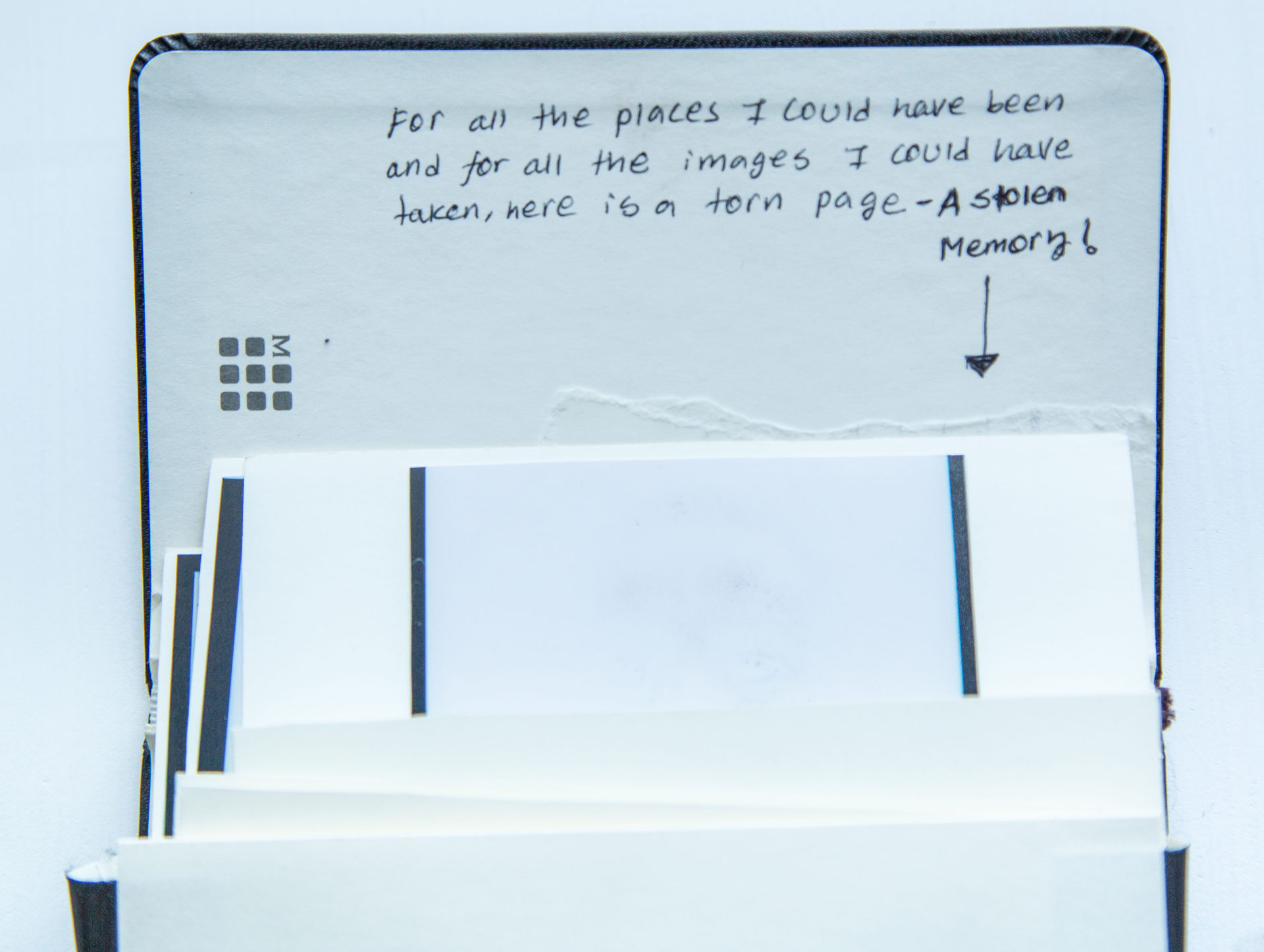
Maheder Haileselassie's photo of her notebook

Haileselassie won the 2023 Contemporary African Photography Prize. The other four winning photographers were Nadia Ettwein, Yassmin Forte, Carlos Idun-Tawiah and Léonard Pongo.

She was chosen as one of the BBC's 100 inspiring women in 2024. The BBC and The Guardian drew attention to her work in 2024 where she documents the effect of climate change on young girls. The rate of child marriage in Somalia had more than doubled as families try to cope with the shortage of food and water. Her photographs show the girls and they document the effect of the drought on the landscape.
