= Aïda Muluneh =

Ethiopian photographer (born 1974)

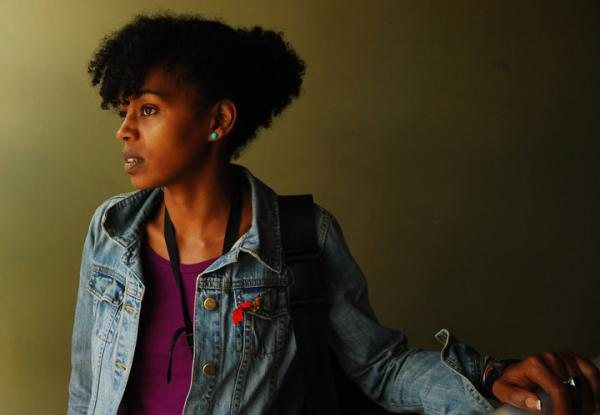
- © Mario Epanya, 2022
- Born: 1974 (age 51–52); Addis Ababa, Ethiopia
- Occupations: Photographer and Artist
- Awards: International Award of Photography, Photographic Curatorship 2010: Winner, International Award of Photography, Centro di Ricerca e Archiviazione della Fotografia (CRAF), Spilimbergo Fotografia, Italy. Edit 2007: European Union Prize, African Photography Encounters, Bamako, Mali
- Website: www.aidamuluneh.com

Aïda Muluneh (born 1974, Addis Ababa, Ethiopia) is an Ethiopian photographer, educator, and entrepreneur known for her Afrofuturist photography that incorporates vibrant colours and body painting to create surreal scenes.

Muluneh won the European Union Prize at African Photography Encounters and the CRAF International Award of Photography. In 2020, she was given the Award for Photographic Curatorship of the Royal Photographic Society.

In 2019, Aïda became the first black woman to co-curate the Nobel Peace Prize Exhibition, and in 2020, the Nobel Peace Prize was awarded to the World Food Program. To mark this momentous occasion, Muluneh created a collection that embodied her artistic vision. Specifically, focusing on displaying how hunger has been used as a weapon of war throughout history.

== Biography ==
Muluneh was born in Addis Ababa, Ethiopia in 1974. She spent her childhood in Cyprus, Greece, the UK, and Yemen before settling in Canada in 1985. As a teenager, Muluneh attended Western Canada High School in Alberta, Canada. While there, she was on the school's basketball team and had aspirations of becoming a basketball star. She also thought of becoming a lawyer or excelling in a similar prestigious profession. These plans took an unexpected turn, when her art teacher opened up a disused darkroom for his students and gave her a camera to use. Although Muluneh began shooting photographs in high school, she did not imagine it as a career until her grandfather, who lived in Ethiopia, came to visit her family. He had served in the Ethiopian Air Force, and enjoyed painting in his spare time. He saw something in her work and told her to continue to work as an artist, rather than putting off her passion as a hobby. She received her BA in film, radio, and television from Howard University in 2000. After her studies, she worked as a photojournalist at the Washington Post, and since then, her work has been shown in several publications. She has since returned to Ethiopia and is based in Addis Ababa.

== Major themes ==
Muluneh incorporates primary colors into her art photography work. The deep reds, blues, and yellows in her paintings can be seen from a great distance. The primary colors reference church wall paintings that can be seen in Ethiopia.

Muluneh's work also primarily features women due to her belief that there is power in the gaze of a woman. By utilizing subjects that are primarily women, Muluneh is able to share her experience with the world. In an interview with NPR, Muluneh stated, "There's an expression that if you teach something to a man, you teach one person, but if you teach something to a woman, you're teaching the whole society."

Muluneh stated, "My work often starts with a sketch, and I approach each image as a film production in which the character, set design, lighting and styling come together. I utilize face painting as a form in which the inspiration is driven by body ornamentation, not only in my country, but also various parts of the world. I am deeply influenced by various traditional cultures, hence in a sense, I am bringing the past into the future through various forms."

== Work ==
Muluneh founded Developing and Educating Societies Through the Arts (DESTA), through which she continues to facilitate and expand cultural projects.

Her work is included in the collection of the National Museum of African Art in Washington, DC. One of her pieces was selected as the poster picture for the traveling exhibition The Divine Comedy, Contemporary African Artists.

She is the founder and director of the international photography festival Addis Foto Fest, a biennial exhibition of global photography. The Addis Foto Fest aimed to bring photography, which had yet to be fully accepted as an art form, to the masses in the same way that photographic studios brought to the public an activity that was once seen as restricted to the aristocracy. Several thousand people attended the exhibitions, aspiring photographers participated in workshops and portfolio reviews with established photographers, and new audiences found their way into galleries and cultural institutions for the first time.

Muluneh's work recognizes the ability that images have to influence the world's perception of people.

== Artwork ==
Part of "The World is 9" series; Art work titled "The Departure". Used for the front cover of the 2018 UNESCO Global Report Reshaping Public Policies

Her first solo exhibit series, The World is Nine, at David Krut Projects in New York, was created in 2016 and inspired by her grandmother. Muluneh digs deep down to her roots as an Ethiopian and gives birth to a humble 28-piece series of culture, space, politics, history, the present, and future in a modern artistic way, including photographs taken at Leghar train station in Addis Ababa of models with African and Ethiopian complexions, bodies painted in bright bold colors, and traditional African body paint. Muluneh reminisces on a time when she was not yet born but is instilled with her grandmother's words that "The world is a 9, it is never complete and it's never perfect." Muluneh stated, "Each work is a reflection of conscious and sub-conscious manifestations of time and space".

In her photograph "The Past, the Present and the Future" from the World Is Nine series, Muluneh expresses full awareness of her present with a firm grip on her past and future. Author M. Neelika Jayawardane's outlook agrees, "…somewhere in between nostalgia for the past and a future that has yet to come". In the photograph, a single woman represents the three stages of a woman's life, the past, present and future. The woman's body is painted in a bright cerulean blue, with white dots going down the center of her face, following her neck and chest. These dots are symbolic of asymmetry and traditional African body painting. She wears the colors of the Ethiopian flag proudly in a bright canary yellow head scarf that hangs before the front of her upper body and a bold long red dress. The woman stands strong and tall, centered in the middle of a pure white background. The white color symbolizes purity, peace, and beauty.

Muluneh's 99 series consists of several carefully staged portraits of a young woman who appears to be of African descent. She is entirely covered in heavy paint and makeup that color her body and face white, and her hands are painted a dark red. The white paint gives the young woman the look of being a ghost or between life and death. The white paint may be in reference to Xhosa face painting. Xhosa men apply white clay on their face and bodies soon after the circumcision ceremony. This affirms the notion that Muluneh's photographs are about "transition and transformation".

Muluneh feels compelled to change the infamous "single story" told about Africa, which is the story of poverty, despair, and corruption. Every other December since 2010, she has presented Addis Foto Fest (AFF), which has become the largest photography festival in Africa. She aims to use the festival as a catalyst to promote change within the minds of non-Africans. "I wanted to build bridges between photographers around the world, not just Africa," said Muluneh, whose own work has been exhibited in several major exhibitions abroad. At portfolio reviews and panel discussions, she shares what she learned from the African-American mentors who gave her opportunities in photography. And through the exhibitions and awards ceremonies at Addis Foto Fest, she hopes to amplify the voices of up-and-coming storytellers. "The festival is an expansion of my passion," she said. "You can fantasize about reaching your own goals but your legacy is always who you can be proud of, who you have passed the torch to." As Hannah Giorgis put it in The Atlantic, "Muluneh is not modest about the endeavor: 'I am basically taking the past to the future,' she said of her mission to galvanize the work of artistic self-portrayal and help shape a new vision of the continent."

In 2018, Muluneh collaborated with WaterAid and H&M Foundation to create the Water Life series. The series was first exhibited at David Krut Projects in New York. It was presented at the Women Deliver 2019 Conference in Vancouver, followed by an exhibition at Somerset House in London. This series contains 12 distinct photographs taken at Dallol, Afar, Ethiopia, a rural area in the north with extremely hot weather all year round. After witnessing countless women encountering great difficulty to fetch water for their families due to the lack of clean water near their home, Muluneh was determined to use the power of her artwork to address this contemporary issue globally. Muluneh emphasized how "each piece is a reflection in addressing the impacts of water access as it relates to women's liberation, health, sanitation and education." She pointed out that people failed to realize how privileged they are to have access to clean water compared to people in some parts of the world suffering from water scarcity. Inspired by her Ethiopian culture, Muluneh incorporated traditional elements like clothing and face paint with bold colors into her photographs to raise awareness and advocate for changes in regions with water scarcity.

== Nonprofit work ==
Aida Muluneh is the founder of DESTA (Developing and Educating Societies Through the Arts), which is an organization that seeks to develop opportunities in the global community for African artists throughout the diaspora. Muluneh returned to Addis Abba from abroad to create a series of educational photography initiatives administered through her nonprofit DESTA for Africa. Her efforts are centered on the activist conversation with photographers who have an interest in contemporary issues that affect the continent of Africa. Muluneh utilizes teaching as way to change the situation in her country at a local level. She encourages high-level instruction, student exchanges, and access to technology.

== Publications ==
=== Publications by Muluneh ===
- Ethiopia: Past, Forward. Brussels: Africalia Editions and Roularta, 2009. ISBN 9789086792009. With an introduction and text by Eddy Boutmans and Simon Njami. Text in English, Dutch and French.
- The World is 9. Johannesburg: David Krut, 2016. OCLC 1021854566. Includes "A stronger light" by Lemn Sissay. In English with subtitles also in Amharic.

=== Publications with contributions by Muluneh ===
- Fiona Rogers and Max Houghton, Firecrackers: Female Photographers Now. London: Thames & Hudson, 2017. ISBN 978-0500544747.

== Awards ==
- 2007: European Union Prize, African Photography Encounters, Bamako, Mali.
- 2010: Winner, International Award of Photography, Centro di Ricerca e Archiviazione della Fotografia (CRAF), Spilimbergo Fotografia, Italy.

== Exhibitions ==
=== Solo exhibitions ===
- This Bloom I Borrow, Efie Gallery, 2026
- Ethiopia Past/forward, Christiansand Kunstforening, Christianssand, 2011
- The World is 9, David Krut Projects, New York City, 2016
- Work from The World is Nine and 99 Series, VivaneArt, Calgary, part of Alberta's Exposure Photography Festival, 2017
- Reflections of Hope: Aida Muluneh in the Aga Khan Park, Aga Khan Museum, Toronto, 2018

=== Group exhibitions ===
- Ethiopian Passages - Dialogues in the Diaspora, National Museum of African Art, Smithsonian Institution, Washington, DC, 2003
- Imágenes Havana, Havana, Cuba, 2003
- 8th International Open, Woman Made Gallery, Chicago, IL, 2005
- Body of Evidence (Selections from the Contemporary African Art Collection), National Museum of African Art, Smithsonian Institution, Washington, DC, 2006
- Spot on..., ifa-Galerie Berlin, 2008
- Spot On… Bamako, Vii. African Photography Encounters, ifa-Galerie Stuttgart, 2009
- Always Moving Forward, Gallery 44 Centre for Contemporary Photography, Toronto, ON, 2010
- The Divine Comedy - Heaven, Purgatory And Hell Revisited By Contemporary African Artists, Museum für Moderne Kunst (MMK), Frankfurt/Main, 2014; SCAD Museum of Art, Savannah, GA
- 1:54 Contemporary African Art Fair, David Krut Projects Booth, Brooklyn, New York, 2016
- I love Africa, Festival La Gacilly-Baden Photo, Austria, 2018
- Being: New Photography, MoMA, New York City, 2018
- A World in Common: Contemporary African Photography, Tate Modern, London, 2023
