= Addis Foto Fest =

Photography festival

Addis Foto Fest is a photography festival held biennially in Addis Ababa, Ethiopia. It takes place over a week in December.

The festival was founded in 2010 by Aida Muluneh and continues to be organised by the company she established, DESTA for Africa Creative Consulting.

In 2010, there were four participating photographers, in 2014, there were 95, and in 2016, there were 126.

== See also ==
- African Photography Encounters
- Art biennials in Africa
- Lagos Photo
