= Linda Mabhena-Olagunju =

South African entrepreneur and businesswoman

- Born: Linda Mabhena; January 1, 1984 (age 42); Eastern Cape, South Africa
- Occupation: Entrepreneur
- Years active: 2007–present
- Title: Founder and CEO of DLO Energy; Member of African Studies Centre's International Advisory Board

Linda Mabhena-Olagunju (born January 1, 1984) is a South African entrepreneur and businesswoman. She is the founder of DLO Energy Resources Group (Pty) Ltd, an independent power producer (IPP). Mabhena-Olagunju currently serves as the company's chief executive officer.

She has been a member of the University of Oxford International Advisory Board since 2018 and is currently an admitted attorney of the High Court of South Africa.

== Early life ==
Mabhena-Olagunju was born in Matatiele in the Eastern Cape, South Africa. Her mother, Pindiwe Mabhena, was a primary school teacher and father Michael a criminal law and litigation lawyer. They were also both entrepreneurs. She has 2 siblings. Mabhena-Olagunju grew up during the period of apartheid. Her mother's family were activists against the apartheid regime and her home provided comfort and shelter to those returning from exile or hiding.

== Education ==
Mabhena-Olagunju attended the National School of Arts High School in Johannesburg; where she majored in drama. She went on to study law at the University of Cape Town, where she attained an LLB (Bachelor of Law). After graduation Mabhena-Olagunju worked at a law firm for a short while before heading to Aberdeen, Scotland to further her education, gaining a masters in International Commercial Law with specialization in oil and gas law.

== Career ==
=== Aberdeen City Council ===
In 2007, Mabhena-Olagunju began working part-time for the Aberdeen City Council. One of her major projects involved developing Aberdeen's first offshore wind farm. This drew major opposition from former U.S. President Donald Trump, who tried to halt the project in a losing court battle; arguing the development would spoil the view from Trump International Golf Links, Scotland.

=== Dewey & LeBoeuf ===
In 2010, Mabhena-Olagunju began work for the global law firm Dewey & LeBeouf in their Johannesburg office. She became the youngest negotiator for the firm and secured funding from the World Bank for South Africa's public electricity utility, Eskom.

=== DLO Energy Resources Group ===
Mabhena-Olagunju launched DLO Energy Resources Group in 2011. She then went on to acquire an equity stake in one of the largest wind farms in Africa. The project was valued at over $3.3 billion. The company recently acquired an equity stake in a large EPC and O&M company, making it South Africa's first majority black-owned female engineering services company.

== Awards and achievements ==
In 2014, Mabhena-Olagunju was listed amongst the 20 most powerful women in Africa featured on the Oprah Winfrey Power List. In 2016, Veuve Clicoquot awarded Mabhena-Olagunju with their annual Elle Boss Award. In 2017, Linda was recognized as the Best Emerging Entrepreneur by Forbes Woman Africa. A year later she was recognized as the 2018 Youngest Board Member on the University of Oxford's International Advisory Board and she appeared in the 2020 Choiseul 100 Africa Economic Leaders For Tomorrow list. She was also recognized by the University of South Africa at the Bring Her Up: Women of Firsts Awards and honored with the Astounding in STEM award.

She is currently a member of the University of Oxford International Advisory Board.

== Personal life ==
Linda Mabhena-Olagunju is married to Olayinka Khalid Olagunju. They have three daughters.
