= Steven Nelson (art historian) =

American art historian (born 1962)

Steven D. Nelson (born 1962) is an American art historian. Nelson is the dean of the Center for Advanced Study in the Visual Arts (CASVA) at the National Gallery of Art in Washington, D.C.

== Early life and education ==
As an undergraduate, Nelson studied studio art at Yale University, where he earned a Bachelor of the Arts in 1985. He worked as a graphic artist for newspapers for several years before going on to earn a master's degree (1994) and PhD (1998) in art history from Harvard University.

== Career ==
Nelson served as Professor of African and African American Art at the University of California, Los Angeles, from 2000 – 2020 before retiring from that role. He was appointed director of the UCLA African Studies Center in 2015, where he worked with faculty at UCLA, other University of California campuses, the Fowler Museum, and cultural institutions at Los Angeles. Nelson has also taught at Tufts University and Wellesley College as well as held visiting faculty appointments at the University of the Andes in Bogotá, Colombia and the School for Advanced Studies in the Social Sciences in Paris, France.

Nelson's scholarship focuses on contemporary and historical African and African diasporic arts, architecture, and urbanism, as well as African American art history and queer studies. His book, From Cameroon to Paris: Mousgoum Architecture In and Out of Africa, was published by the University of Chicago Press in 2007. His writing has frequently appeared in African Arts, where he formerly served as a consulting editor, as well as in other scholarly journals such as Nka: Journal of Contemporary African Art and Art Journal, where he also served as a former reviews editor. He more recently co-edited Visualizing Empire: Africa, Europe, and the Politics of Representation with Rebecca Peabody and Dominic Thomas, published in 2021.

Nelson has received grants and fellowships from the Getty Research Institute, the Kress Foundation, and Harvard University Radcliffe Institute for Advanced Study. In 2018, Nelson became the Andrew W. Mellon Professor at the Center for Advanced Study in the Visual Arts at the National Gallery of Art while on leave from his appointment at UCLA. In March 2020, his appointment as the third dean of CASVA was announced, and he began his position in July of that year.
