= Kevin Sampson (artist) =

American artist (1954–2026)

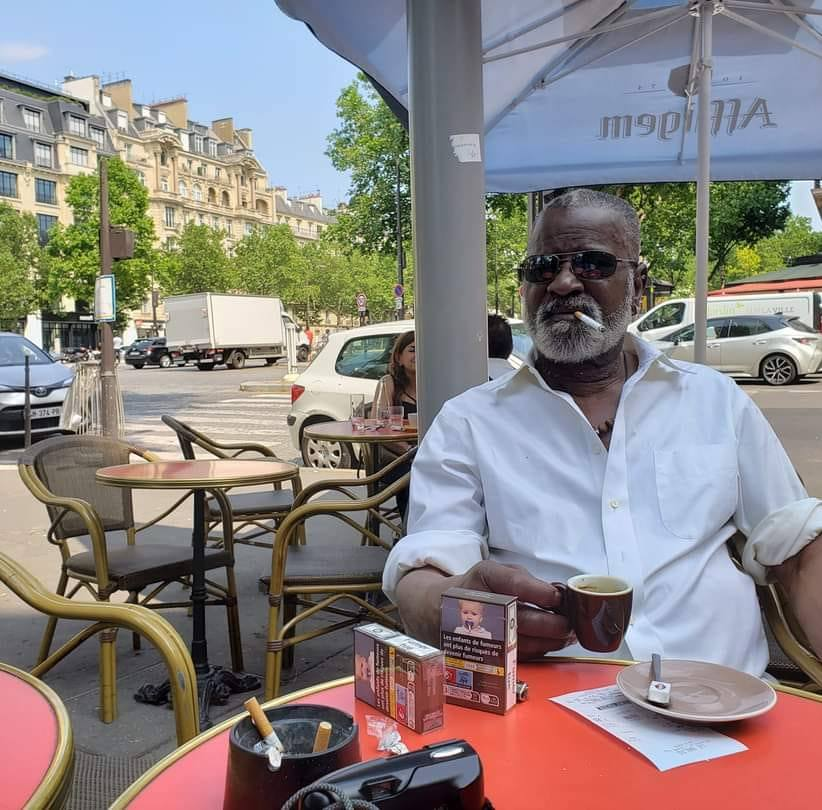
- Sampson in Paris, 2023
- Born: Kevin Blythe Sampson; November 28, 1954; Elizabeth, New Jersey, U.S.
- Died: March 18, 2026 (aged 71); Newark, New Jersey, U.S.
- Education: Newark School of Fine and Industrial Arts
- Known for: Illustrator, painter, found object sculptor, composite sketch artist and teacher Retired police officer
- Movement: Contemporary

Kevin Blythe Sampson (November 28, 1954 – March 18, 2026) was an American artist and police detective-composite sketch artist, who lived in Newark, New Jersey. He made sculptures from discarded found objects; he was also an illustrator, painter and muralist. His studio was based out of Newark.

== Early life and education ==
Sampson was born on November 28, 1954, in Elizabeth, New Jersey. Following high school and a few years of college, Sampson became a police officer and then a detective with the Scotch Plains Police Department in New Jersey. During his career as a police officer, Sampson worked as a composite sketch artist for the Scotch Plains Police Department, the first African American uniformed police composite sketch artist in the country.

After the deaths of both an infant son and shortly thereafter his wife (Pamela), both died of unrelated illness. Kevin took an early retirement after almost 20 years, to raise his two children.

Leaving his house in Old Bridge NJ, Sampson moved his family to Newark in 1993 where he attended and graduated from the Newark School of Fine and Industrial Arts. He began focusing on his art full-time following the deaths of close family members and his retirement from the Scotch Plains Police Department. Sampson began teaching at the Newark school of fine and Industrial art in 1981 until its closing in 1996, Sampson has continued teaching at various schools, colleges in NJ and other states.

== Career ==
Sampson was a gallery artist with Cavin-Morris Gallery in New York since 1992. Sampson makes sculptures from found objects, such as glass cabinet knobs, sticks, strings, screws, and wood chips. These sculptures act as altars, memorials, and spiritual objects. Sampson's work has been influenced by other New York artists who honor the dead through vernacular memorials. His work differs from these artists, as most create murals in Latin American neighborhoods and these street-side, altar-like assemblages of objects are meant to last through only a brief public-display period of remembrance and grief.

He began making art as a means to heal after the death of several family members and as a new way to give back to his community. In the early 1990s, Sampson's wife, Pamela, was diagnosed with a terminal illness and their son, Kyle, was born prematurely and died. Sampson's work references and incorporates African spiritual traditions, including Yoruba, and follows the traditions of the Griot or storyteller. Much of Sampson's work offers commentary on issues of race, racism, and various forms of systemic injustice in the United States. Alongside other Newark-based artists, Sampson has spoken out against the recent, ongoing gentrification taking place in Newark, NJ.

Sampson completed a number of residencies throughout the United States, including The Marie Walsh Sharp Space program in New York City; a teaching residency at the John Michael Kohler Art Center in Sheboygan, Wisconsin; the Joan Mitchell Center's residency in New Orleans; the Art and Industry Residency at the Kohler in Wisconsin; and the Inaugural Residency at the Mystic Seaport Museum in Connecticut. His 2019 participation at the International Society of Biourbanism, summer School, Artena (Rome) Italy as a speaker, 2020 Residency in Martha's Vineyard in Union Chapel, in conjunction with the Mariposa Museum, was sponsored by the Vineyard Trust.

== Television appearance ==
Sampson was turned into a cartoon, appearing as himself in the PBS Kids animated series Arthur, helping George with a school art project. Kevin's actual artwork is featured in the episode "George Scraps His Sculpture."

== Death ==
Sampson died on March 18, 2026, at the age of 71.

== Selected exhibitions ==
- 2020: CROSSROADS: Artists of the Black Pan-American Home Ground American Perspectives: Stories from the American Folk Art Museum Collection
- 2020: Carnegie Museum, Installation Legend of Flying Africans, Martha's Vineyard
- 2020: Mariposa Museum & World Culture Center Installation “Legend of Flying Africans” Martha's Vineyard
- 2019: Artena Italy (Rome) Created site specific found object sculpture for the town
- 2019: "Black and Blue" - New Jersey Center for Visual Arts
- 2019: "Olde Soul" - Rutgers University, Paul Robeson Gallery
- 2019: "Monument Man" - Mystic Seaport Museum
- 2013: Installation “An Ill Wind Blowing” City Without Walls, Newark, NJ
- 2013: Installation the INTUIT - The Center for Intuitive and Outsider Art, Chicago “An Ill Wind Blowing”
- 2012: Spirit—Fire—Shake! Focal objects by Renée Stout, Kevin Sampson and Odinga Tyehimba, Gregg Museum of Art & Design, North Carolina State University (Raleigh, NC)
- 2013: Kevin Blythe Sampson: An Ill Wind Blowing, Intuit: The Center for Intuitive and Outsider Art (Chicago, IL)
- 2014: The Roots of the Spirit: Lonnie Holley, Mr. Imagination, Charlie Lucas, Kevin Sampson, Weigand Gallery, Notre Dame de Namur University (Belmont, CA)
- 2015: Anthems for the Mother Earth Goddess, Andrew Edlin Gallery (New York, NY)
- 2016: Modern Heroics: 75 Years of African-American Expressionism, Newark Museum (Newark, NJ)

== Residencies ==
- 2023: Les Thermes residency 4 Place De Bains, Bourbonne Les Bains, France
- 2019: International Society of Biourbanism, residency, Artena (Rome) Italy
- 1994: Marie Walsh Sharpe Foundation, Artist-in-Residence (New York, New York)
- 2001: Joan Mitchell Foundation, Painters & Sculptors Grant (New Orleans, Louisiana)
- 2016: Joan Mitchell Center, Artist-in-Residence (New Orleans, Louisiana)
- 2017: John Michael Kohler Arts Center, Kohler Arts and Industry Residency (Kohler Village, Wisconsin)

== Public collections ==
- University of Wisconsin Milwaukee
- Mariposa Museum and world culture Cent
- Racine Museum of Art
- Kohler Foundation
- The Newark Museum
- The Center for Intuitive and Outsider art, Chicago Ill
- Museum of American Folk Art, New York, NY
- Menello Museum of American Folk Art, Orlando, Florida
- Montgomery Museum Of Art, Montgomery Alabama
- Mystic Seaport Museum
- Newark New jersey Public Library

== Board of directors ==
Former Member City without Walls Gallery, 6 Crawford St, Newark, New Jersey Board member 2023-24 Intuit the Center for Intuitive and Outsider art, Chicago 2025-26 Intuit Museum of Art member of the Strategic Advisory Council
