= Contemporary African Photography Prize =

- Awarded for: Photography
- First award: 2012
- Website: www.capprize.com

The Contemporary African Photography Prize, also known as the CAP Prize, is an annual international award given to five photographers for work created on the African continent, or which engages with the African diaspora. It was established in 2012 by Benjamin Füglister, and Until 2016 was named POPCAP (piclet.org Prize for Contemporary African Photography).

== Winners ==
- POPCAP 2014
  - Joana Choumali with Hââbré, The last Generation
  - Ilan Godfrey with Legacy of the Mine
  - Léonard Pongo with The Uncanny
  - Anoek Steketee and Eefje Blankevoort with Love Radio
  - Patrick Willocq with I am Walé Respect Me
- CAP Prize 2018
  - Yassine Alaoui Ismaili with Casablanca Not the Movie
  - Paul Botes with Marikana - The Aftermath
  - Anna Boyiazis with Finding Freedom in the Water
  - Tommaso Fiscaletti and Nic Grobler with Hemelliggaam or The Attempt to be Here Now
  - Phumzile Khanyile with Plastic Crowns
- CAP Prize 2021
  - Aàdesokan
  - Katel Delia
  - Jason Florio
  - Fabrice Monteiro
  - Joseph Obanubi
- CAP Prize 2022
  - Amina Kadous with White Gold
  - Remofiloe Nomandla Mayisela with Lip Service
  - Lee-Ann Olwage with Kakenya's Dream
  - Mahefa Dimbiniaina Randrianarivelo with Sarotava
  - Pamela Tulizo with Double identité
- CAP Prize 2023
  - Nadia Ettwein with Hond
  - Yassmin Forte with This is a story about my family
  - Maheder Haileselassie with Between Yesterday and Tomorrow
  - Carlos Idun-Tawiah with Sunday Special
  - Léonard Pongo with Primordial Earth
