= Seydou Keïta =

Malian photographer (1921/23–2001)

- Born: 1921/1923; Bamako, Mali
- Died: November 21, 2001 (aged 79–80); Paris, France
- Citizenship: Mali
- Occupation: Photographer
- Website: www.seydoukeitaphotographer.com

Seydou Keïta (1921/23 – 21 November 2001) was a Malian photographer known for his portraits of people and families he took at his portrait photography studio in Mali's capital, Bamako, in the 1950s. His photographs are widely acknowledged not only as a record of Malian society but also as pieces of art.

== Biography ==
Keïta was born in 1921 in Bamako, Mali, although the exact date is unknown. He was the oldest in a family of five children. His father Bâ Tièkòró and his uncle Tièmòkò were furniture makers. Keïta developed an interest in photography when his uncle gave him a Kodak Brownie with a film with eight shots in 1935, after returning from a trip to Senegal. In the beginning, Keïta worked as both a carpenter and photographer, taking first portraits of his family and friends, later of people in the neighborhood. He learned photography and how to develop from Pierre Garnier, a French photographic supply store owner, and from Mountaga Traoré, his mentor. In 1948, he set up his first studio in the family house in Bamako-Koura behind the main prison.

After acquiring studio space and a dark room, Keïta began shooting portraits of clients, and he eventually garnered a reputation for his style in both his photos and the way in which he shot his subjects. In an interview with art curator André Magnin, Keïta describes his process and says that he showed his clients examples of previous portraits he had done, allowed them to pick a pose that they would like, and then he says: "I suggested a position that was better suited for them, and in effect, I determined the good position. I was never wrong." Another aspect of Keïta's style that led to his popularity as a portrait photographer was the "innovative use of props and backdrops" in all his photos. He would often use backdrops that had stark patterns. Many people cite how well these backgrounds specifically went with his female subject’s clothes but Keïta has often described this as being a coincidence. Keïta was highly sought after by his clients not only for his signature style, but the culture and elegance that a photo of themselves stamped with the words "Photo SEYDOU KEÏTA" represented.

Keïta did not record the identity of thousands of Malians that passed through his studio. Since 1948, he had meticulously preserved all his negatives which he estimated ranged from 7,000 to 30,000. His archives were categorized by broad types (e.g. couples, groups, and single full-figures) then subcategorized by date. Every few years, Keïta would renew his studio props, which would later help establish the chronology of his work. He wanted to portray Mali's memories and traditions stating that, he wanted "to take pictures of our rural people during harvest time, and the ritual ceremonies that go about then. That is where the essence of Mali comes out." Elizabeth Bigham, a scholar at Columbia University, describes how the period shaped his art, saying that, "his studio was born during the immense economic and demographic boom that swept Bamako in the years after World War II."

In 1962, shortly after Mali gained independence, Keïta was offered a job by the Mali head of police and the director of Malian National Security. He was asked to be the official government photographer, and he swiftly took the job. Though he continued working for the government for many years, Keïta’s new job eventually lead to the shutdown of his studio in 1963.

He remained famous in Mali despite his retirement in 1977. In an article for African Arts, Keïta explained that he quit photography once color became successful. In 1991, Keïta's work became known outside of West Africa when his works were shown anonymously at the Center for African Art in New York City. Though his work was first introduced to international audiences through his anonymous presence at this "African Express" exhibition, he has since been identified and given recognition in later exhibitions. This is due in part to art curator André Magnin, who sought to find him after seeing his anonymous work. Magnin was later entrusted with thousands of Keïta's negatives, these making up the majority of his publicly displayed work.

Keïta died on 21 November 2001 in Paris.

== Publications ==
- Keïta, Seydou, André Magnin, and Youssouf Cissé. Seydou Keïta. Zurich: Scalo, 1997. ISBN 3-931141-46-2
- Lamunière, Michelle, Seydou Keita, and Malick Sidibé. You Look Beautiful Like That: The Portrait Photographs of Seydou Keïta and Malick Sidibé. Cambridge: Harvard University Art Museums, 2001. ISBN 1-891771-20-5
- Seydou Keita: Photographs, Bamako, Mali 1948-1963. Göttingen: Steidl, 2011. ISBN 978-3-86930-301-7.
- McKinley, Catherine E. Seydou Keïta: A Tactile Lens. DelMonico Books, 2025. ISBN 978-1-636-81188-8

== Exhibitions ==
=== Solo exhibitions ===
- 2001: Flash Afrique, Kunsthalle Wien, Vienna, Austria & Düsseldorf Cultural Forum, Germany
- 2011: Seydou Keïta, Gallery Fifty One, Antwerp, Belgium
- 2018: Bamako Portraits, Foam Fotografiemuseum Amsterdam, Amsterdam, Netherlands
- 2025: Seydou Keïta: A Tactile Lens, Brooklyn Museum, Brooklyn, New York

=== Group exhibitions ===
- 1996: African Photographers, Guggenheim Museum, New York, USA
- 2005: "African Art Now: Masterpieces from the Jean Pigozzi Collection. Date open to public: 1/29/2005". prv.mfah.org/archives. Museum of Fine Arts Houston, USA. Archived from the original on 2018-03-23.
- 2006: About Africa, part one, Gallery Fifty One, Antwerp, Belgium
- 2006: Some Tribes, Christophe Guye Galerie, Zurich, Switzerland
- 2006: Vive l'Afrique, Galerie du Jour – Agnès b., Tokyo, Japan
- 2006: 100% Africa, Guggenheim Museum, Bilbao, Spain
- 2007: Why Africa?, Pinacoteca Giovanni e Marella Agnelli, Turin, Italy
- 2008: Accrochage, Gallery Fifty One, Antwerp, Belgium
- 2009: Masters of Photography, Gallery Fifty One, Antwerp, Belgium
- 2015: The Pistil's Waltz, Gallery Fifty One, Antwerp, Belgium

== Collections ==
Keita's work is held in the following permanent collections:

- The Art Institute of Chicago, Chicago, Illinois: 8 items
- Saint Louis Art Museum, St. Louis, Missouri: 2 items
- Minneapolis Institute of Art, Minneapolis, Minnesota: 6 items
- Museum of Modern Art, New York, New York: 10 items
- University of Chicago Booth School of Business, Chicago, Illinois: 5 items
