= Duraid Kashmoula =

Iraqi politician (1943–2024)

- دريد كشمولة
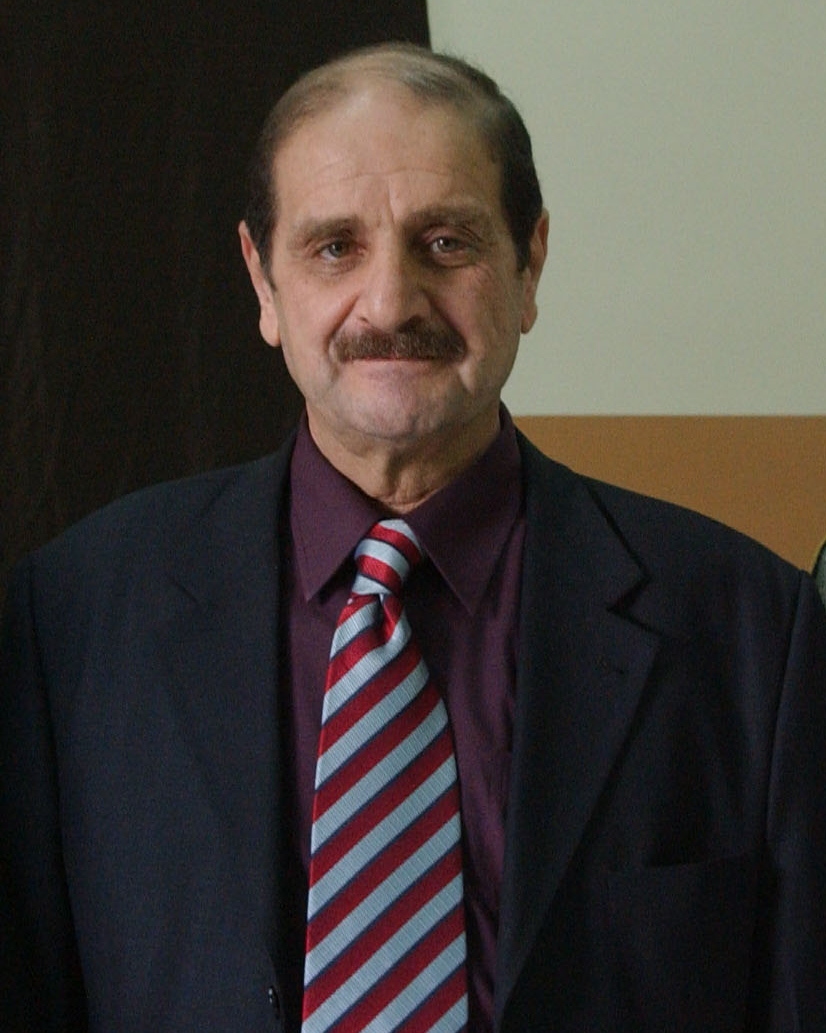
- Kashmoula in 2009

Governor of Nineveh
- In office July 2004 – April 2009
- Deputy: Kasro Goran
- Preceded by: Osama Youssef Kashmoula
- Succeeded by: Atheel al-Nujaifi

Personal details
- Born: 1943 Iraq
- Died: 19 July 2024 (aged 81)
- Party: Independent
- Relations: Osama Youssef Kashmoula (cousin)

Duraid Mohammed Da'ud Abbodi Kashmoula (Arabic: دريد كشمولة; 1943 – 19 July 2024) was an Iraqi politician who served as Governor of Nineveh Province from July 2004 to April 2009.

Kashmoula became Governor following the assassination of his cousin, Osama Youssef Kashmoula, who was killed while driving to Baghdad.

During his term as Governor, he was the target of several assassination attempts from Sunni militants that disapproved of his working with the new Iraqi government. Other members of his family have also been targeted, with his 17-year-old son being assassinated in September 2004, and his brother in late 2006. Nine of his cousins have been killed, as well as 17 of his bodyguards.

Following the end of his governorship, he moved to Arbil. He died on 19 July 2024, at the age of 81.
