= David Petraeus =

American U.S. Army general (born 1952)

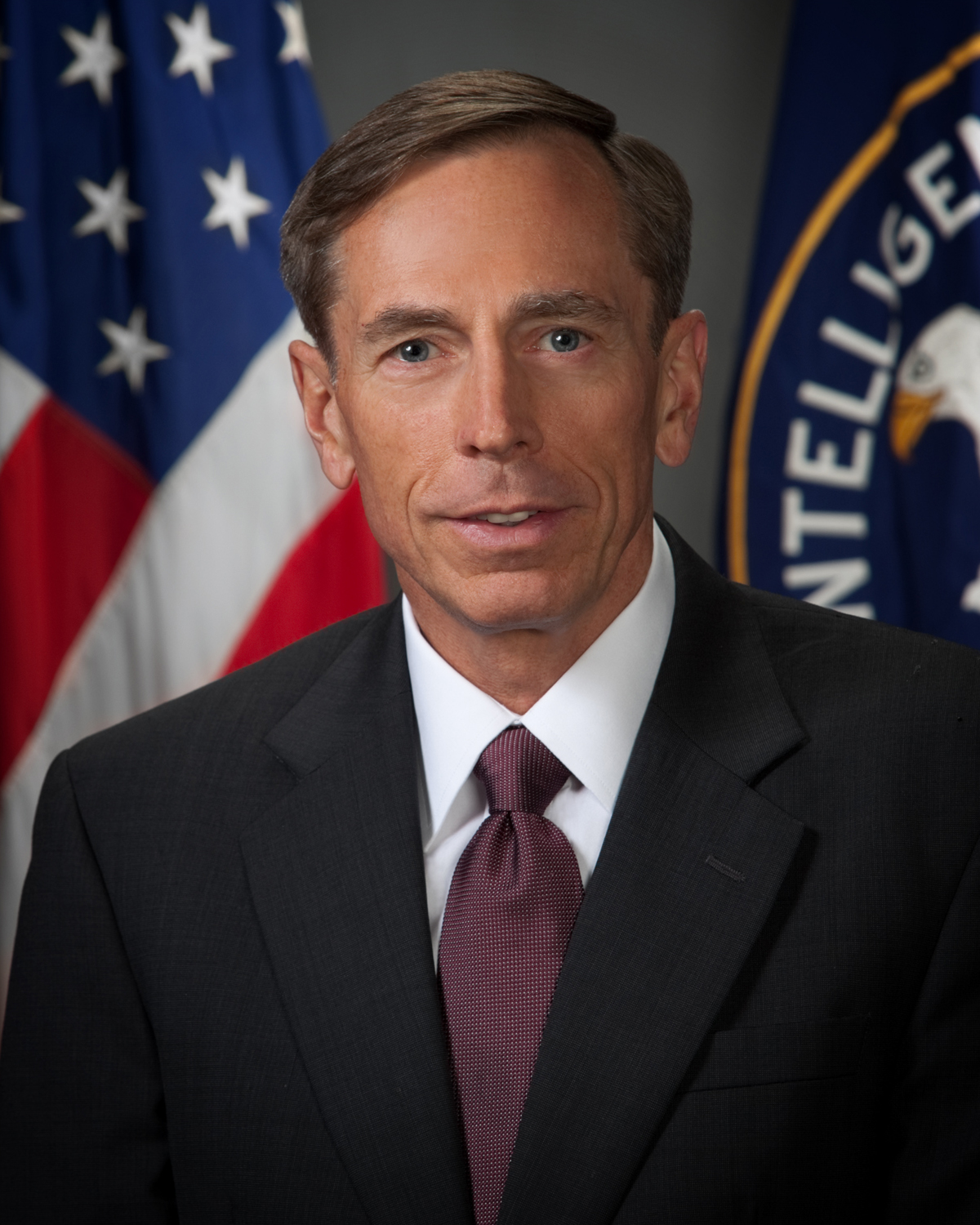
- Official portrait, 2011

4th Director of the Central Intelligence Agency
- In office 6 September 2011 – 9 November 2012
- President: Barack Obama
- Deputy: Michael Morell
- Preceded by: Leon Panetta
- Succeeded by: John Brennan

Commander of the International Security Assistance Force
- In office 4 July 2010 – 18 July 2011
- Preceded by: Stanley A. McChrystal
- Succeeded by: John R. Allen

Commander of United States Central Command
- In office 31 October 2008 – 30 June 2010
- Preceded by: Martin Dempsey (acting)
- Succeeded by: John R. Allen (acting)

Personal details
- Born: David Howell Petraeus; 7 November 1952 (age 74) Cornwall-on-Hudson, New York, U.S.
- Party: Republican (before 2002); Independent (since 2002)
- Spouse: Holly Knowlton (m. 1974)
- Children: 2
- Education: United States Military Academy (BS); Princeton University (MPA, PhD)

Military service
- Allegiance: United States
- Branch/service: United States Army
- Years of service: 1974–2011
- Rank: General
- Commands: International Security Assistance Force; United States Forces-Afghanistan; United States Central Command; Multinational Force-Iraq; United States Army Combined Arms Center; Fort Leavenworth; Multinational Security Transition Command-Iraq; 101st Airborne Division (Air Assault); 1st Brigade, 82nd Airborne Division; 3rd Battalion, 187th Infantry Regiment
- Battles/wars: See list: Stabilisation Force; Operation Uphold Democracy; Operation Desert Spring; Iraq War; Anbar campaign (2003–2011); Battle of Karbala (2003); Battle of the Karbala Gap (2003); Battle of Mosul (2004); Operation Shurta Nasir; Operation Phantom Thunder; Operation Phantom Strike; Operation Phantom Phoenix; 2008 Nineveh campaign; Battle of Basra (2008); 2008 al-Qaeda offensive in Iraq; War in Afghanistan; Battle of Wanat
- Awards: Defense Distinguished Service Medal (4); Army Distinguished Service Medal (3); Defense Superior Service Medal (2); Legion of Merit (4); Bronze Star with valor NATO Meritorious Service Medal; Officer of the Order of Australia (More)
- Petraeus's voice Petraeus on applying past experiences in Iraq to his position as commander of U.S. forces in Afghanistan; Recorded 29 June 2010

David Howell Petraeus (/pɪˈtreɪ.əs/; born 7 November 1952) is a retired United States Army general who served as the fourth director of the Central Intelligence Agency (CIA) from September 2011 until his resignation in November 2012. Prior to his assuming the directorship of the CIA, Petraeus served 37 years in the United States Army. His last assignments in the Army were as commander of the International Security Assistance Force (ISAF) and commander, U.S. Forces – Afghanistan (USFOR-A) from July 2010 to July 2011. His other four-star assignments include serving as the 10th commander, U.S. Central Command (USCENTCOM) from October 2008 to June 2010, and as commanding general, Multi-National Force – Iraq (MNF-I) from February 2007 to September 2008. As commander of MNF-I, Petraeus oversaw all coalition forces in Iraq.

Petraeus was the General George C. Marshall Award winner as the top graduate of the U.S. Army Command and General Staff College class of 1983. He later served as assistant professor of international relations at the United States Military Academy and also completed a fellowship at Georgetown University. Since 2022, he has taught courses in international relations at Yale University as a Kissinger Senior Fellow of the university's Jackson Institute for Global Affairs.

Petraeus has repeatedly stated that he has no plans to run for elected political office. On 23 June 2010, president Barack Obama nominated Petraeus to succeed General Stanley McChrystal as commanding general of the International Security Assistance Force in Afghanistan, technically a step down from his position as Commander of United States Central Command, which oversees the military efforts in Afghanistan, Pakistan, Central Asia, the Arabian Peninsula, and Egypt.

On 30 June 2011, Petraeus was unanimously confirmed as the director of the CIA by the U.S. Senate 94–0. Petraeus relinquished command of U.S. and NATO forces in Afghanistan on 18 July 2011, and retired from the U.S. Army on 31 August 2011. On 9 November 2012, he resigned from his position as director of the CIA, citing his extramarital affair with his biographer Paula Broadwell, which was discovered in the course of an Federal Bureau of Investigation (FBI) investigation. In January 2015, officials reported that the FBI and the Department of Justice (DOJ) prosecutors had recommended bringing felony charges against Petraeus for providing classified information to Broadwell while serving as director of the CIA. Eventually, Petraeus pleaded guilty to one misdemeanor charge of mishandling classified information. He was later sentenced to two years of probation and fined US$100,000 for the unauthorized removal and retention of classified material he gave to Broadwell.

== Early life and education ==
Petraeus was born in Cornwall-on-Hudson, New York, the son of Miriam Sweet (née Howell), a librarian, and Sixtus Petraeus, a sea captain. His father was a Dutch merchant mariner who immigrated to the United States at the start of World War II, from Franeker, the Netherlands, and his mother was American, a resident of Brooklyn, New York. They met at the Seamen's Church Institute of New York and New Jersey and married. Sixtus Petraeus commanded a Liberty ship for the U.S. for the duration of World War II. The family moved after the war, settling in Cornwall-on-Hudson, where Petraeus grew up and graduated from Cornwall Central High School in 1970.

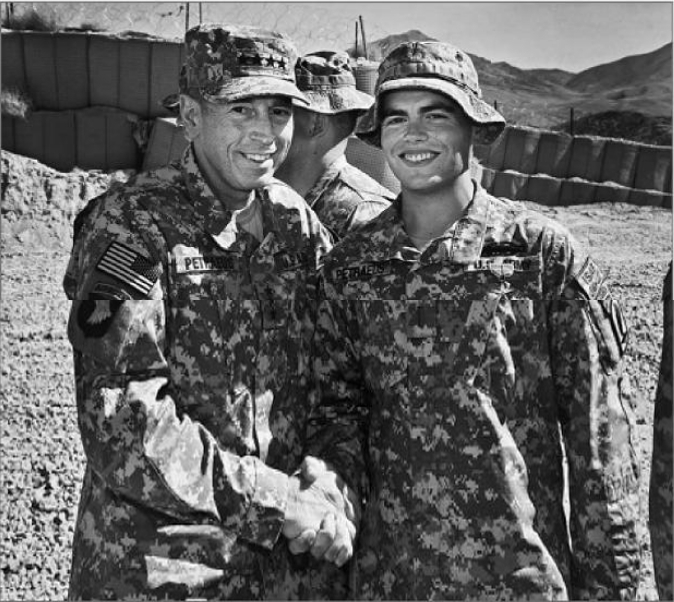
Petraeus with his son Stephen in Afghanistan, 2010

Petraeus went on to the United States Military Academy at West Point. Petraeus was on the intercollegiate soccer and ski teams, was a cadet captain on the brigade staff, and was a "distinguished cadet" academically, graduating in the top 5% of the Class of 1974 (ranked 40th overall). In the class yearbook, Petraeus was remembered as "always going for it in sports, academics, leadership, and even his social life".

While a cadet, Petraeus started dating the daughter of Army General William A. Knowlton (the West Point superintendent at the time), Holly. Two months after Petraeus graduated, they married. Holly, who is multi-lingual, was a National Merit Scholar in high school, and graduated summa cum laude from Dickinson College. They have a daughter and son, Anne and Stephen. Petraeus administered the oath of office at his son's 2009 commissioning into the Army after his son's graduation from the Massachusetts Institute of Technology. His son went on to serve as an officer in Afghanistan as a member of 3rd Platoon, Alpha Company, 1st Battalion, 503rd Infantry Regiment, 173rd Airborne Brigade Combat Team.

Petraeus's residence is a small property in the Springfield, New Hampshire, which his wife inherited from her family. Petraeus once told a friend that he was a Rockefeller Republican.

Petraeus graduated from West Point in 1974, receiving a B.S. degree in Military Science. He earned the General George C. Marshall Award as the top graduate of the U.S. Army Command and General Staff College Class of 1983 at Fort Leavenworth, Kansas. He subsequently earned an M.P.A. degree in 1985 and a Ph.D. in international relations and economics in 1987 from Princeton University's Woodrow Wilson School of Public and International Affairs, where he was mentored by Richard H. Ullman, an international relations scholar and progressive commentator.

At that time, he also served as an assistant professor of international relations at the U.S. Military Academy from 1985 to 1987. His doctoral dissertation was The American Military and the Lessons of Vietnam: A Study of Military Influence and the Use of Force in the Post-Vietnam Era. He completed a military fellowship at Georgetown University's Edmund A. Walsh School of Foreign Service in 1994–1995, although he was called away early to serve in Haiti as the Chief of Operations for NATO there in early 1995.

From late 2005 through February 2007, Petraeus served as commanding general of Fort Leavenworth, Kansas, and the U.S. Army Combined Arms Center (CAC) located there. As commander of CAC, Petraeus was responsible for oversight of the Command and General Staff College and seventeen other schools, centers, and training programs as well as for developing the Army's doctrinal manuals, training the Army's officers, and supervising the Army's center for the collection and dissemination of lessons learned. During his time at CAC, Petraeus and Marine Lt. Gen. James F. Amos jointly oversaw the publication of Field Manual 3–24, Counterinsurgency, the body of which was written by an unusually diverse group of military officers, academics, human rights advocates, and journalists who had been assembled by Petraeus and Amos.

At both Fort Leavenworth and throughout the military's schools and training programs, Petraeus integrated the study of counterinsurgency into lesson plans and training exercises. In recognition of the fact that soldiers in Iraq often performed duties far different from those for which they trained, Petraeus stressed the importance of teaching soldiers how to think and how to fight, and the need to foster flexibility and adaptability in leaders.

Petraeus called this change the most significant part of The Surge, saying in 2016, "the surge that mattered most was the surge of ideas. It was the change of strategy, and in many respects, this represented quite a significant change to what it was we were doing before the surge." Petraeus has at times been labeled "the world's leading expert in counter-insurgency warfare". Later, having refined his ideas on counterinsurgency based on the implementation of the new counterinsurgency doctrine in Iraq, he published both in Iraq as well as in the Sep/Oct 2008 edition of Military Review his "Commander's Counterinsurgency Guidance" to help guide leaders and units in the Multi-National Force-Iraq.

== U.S. Army Officer (1974 – 2011) ==
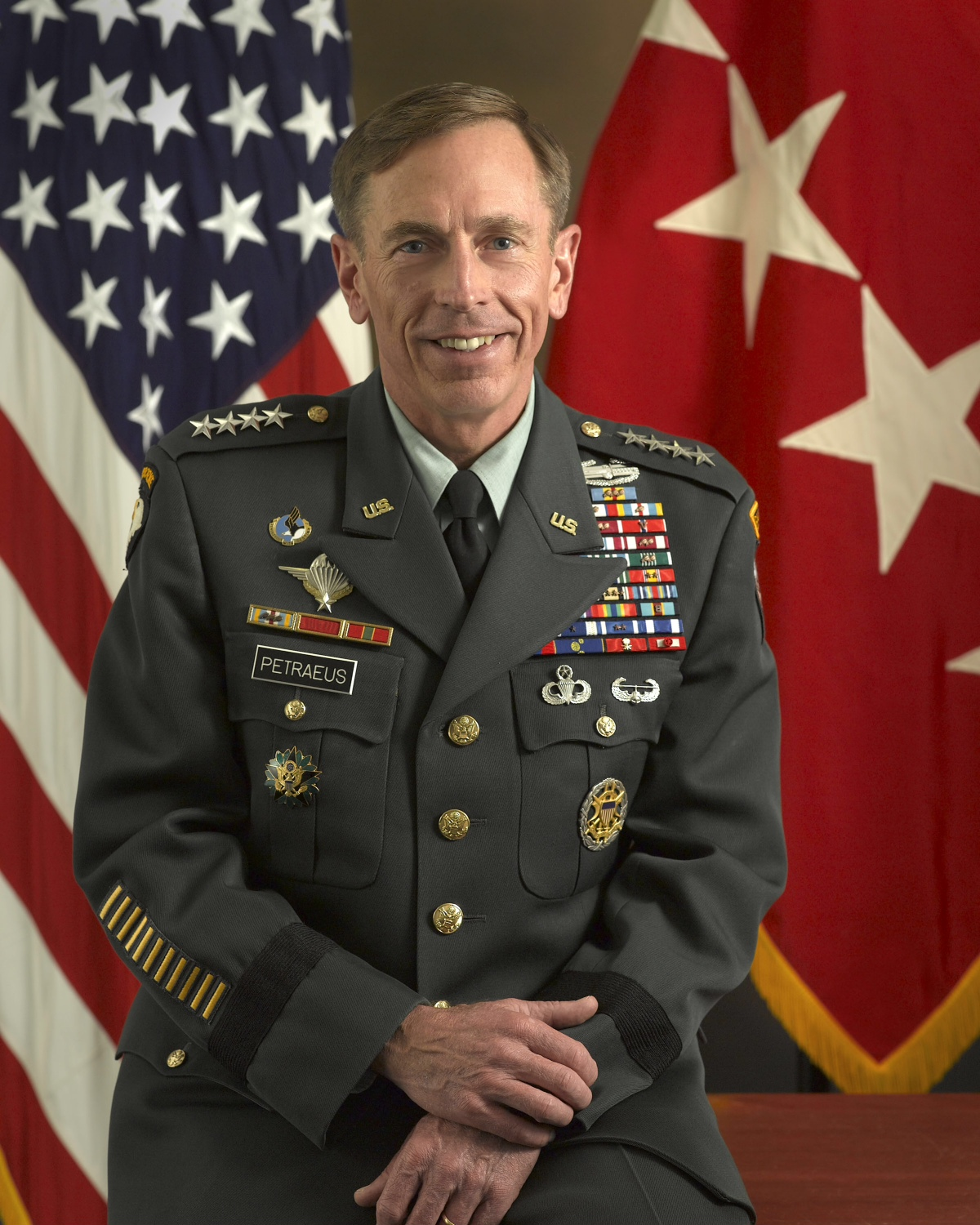
U.S. Army Gen. David H. Petraeus, during his time in the Army

=== 1970s ===
Upon his graduation from West Point in 1974, Petraeus was commissioned an infantry officer. After completing Ranger School (Distinguished Honor Graduate and other honors), Petraeus was assigned to the 509th Airborne Battalion Combat Team, a light infantry unit stationed in Vicenza, Italy. Ever since, light infantry has been at the core of his career, punctuated by assignments to mechanized units, unit commands, staff assignments, and educational institutions. After leaving the 509th as a first lieutenant, Petraeus began a brief association with mechanized units when he became assistant operations officer on the staff of the 2nd Brigade, 24th Infantry Division (Mechanized), at Fort Stewart, Georgia. In 1979, he assumed command of a company in the same division: A Company, 2nd Battalion, 19th Infantry Regiment (Mechanized), and then served as that battalion's operations officer, a major's position that he held as a junior captain.

=== 1980s ===
In 1981, Petraeus became aide-de-camp to General John Galvin, then commanding general of the 24th Infantry Division (Mechanized). He spent the next few years furthering his military and civilian education, including spending 1982–83 at Fort Leavenworth, Kansas, attending the Command and General Staff College. At graduation in 1983, he was the General George C. Marshall Award winner as the top graduate of the U.S. Army Command and General Staff College. From 1983 to 1985, he was at Princeton; and 1985–87 at West Point.

After earning his Ph.D. and teaching at West Point, Petraeus continued up the command ladder, serving as military assistant to Gen. John Galvin, the Supreme Allied Commander in Europe. From there, he moved to the 3rd Infantry Division (Mechanized). During 1988–1989, he served as operations officer to the 3rd Infantry Division (Mechanized)'s 30th Infantry Regiment. He was then posted as an aide and assistant executive officer to the U.S. Army Chief of Staff, General Carl Vuono, in Washington, D.C.

=== 1990s ===
Upon promotion to lieutenant colonel, Petraeus moved from the office of the chief of staff to Fort Campbell, Kentucky, where he commanded the 101st Airborne Division (Air Assault)'s 3rd Battalion 187th Infantry Regiment, known as the "Iron Rakkasans", from 1991 to 1993. In 1991 he was accidentally shot in the chest with an M-16 rifle during a live-fire exercise when a soldier tripped and his rifle discharged. He was taken to Vanderbilt University Medical Center, Nashville, Tennessee, where he was operated on by future U.S. Senator Bill Frist. The hospital released him early after he did fifty push-ups without resting, just a few days after the accident.

During 1993–94, Petraeus continued his long association with the 101st Airborne Division (Air Assault) as the division's assistant chief of staff, G-3 (plans, operations, and training) and installation director of plans, training, and mobilization (DPTM). In 1995, he was assigned to the United Nations Mission in Haiti Military Staff as its chief operations officer during Operation Uphold Democracy. His next command, from 1995 to 1997, was the 1st Brigade, 82nd Airborne Division, centered on the 504th Parachute Infantry Regiment. At that post, his brigade's training cycle at Fort Polk's Joint Readiness Training Center for low-intensity warfare was chronicled by novelist and military enthusiast Tom Clancy in his book Airborne.

From 1997 to 1999, Petraeus served in the Pentagon as executive assistant to the director of the Joint Staff and then to the Chairman of the Joint Chiefs, Gen. Henry Shelton, who described Petraeus as "a high-energy individual who likes to lead from the front, in any field, he is going into". In 1999, as a brigadier general, Petraeus returned to the 82nd, serving as the assistant division commander for operations and then, briefly, as acting commanding general. During his time with the 82nd, he deployed to Kuwait as part of Operation Desert Spring, the continuous rotation of combat forces through Kuwait during the decade after the Gulf War.

=== 2000s ===
From the 82nd, he moved on to serve as chief of staff of XVIII Airborne Corps at Fort Bragg during 2000–2001. In 2000, Petraeus suffered his second major injury, when, during a civilian skydiving jump, his parachute collapsed at low altitude due to a hook turn, resulting in a hard landing that broke his pelvis. He was selected for promotion to major general in 2001. During 2001–2002, as a brigadier general, Petraeus served a ten-month tour in Bosnia and Herzegovina as part of Operation Joint Forge. In Bosnia, he was the NATO Stabilization Force assistant chief of staff for operations as well as the deputy commander of the U.S. Joint Interagency Counter-Terrorism Task Force, a command created after the 9/11 attacks to add counterterrorism capability to the U.S. forces attached to the NATO command in Bosnia. In 2004, he was promoted to lieutenant general.

In 2007, he was promoted to General. On 23 April 2008, Secretary of Defense Gates announced that President Bush was nominating General Petraeus to command U.S. Central Command (USCENTCOM), headquartered in Tampa, Florida. In 2010, Petraeus was nominated to command the International Security Assistance Force in Afghanistan, which required Senate confirmation. He was confirmed on 30 June 2010, and took over command from temporary commander Lieutenant-General Sir Nick Parker on 4 July 2010.

=== Involvement in the Iraq War ===
==== 101st Airborne Division ====
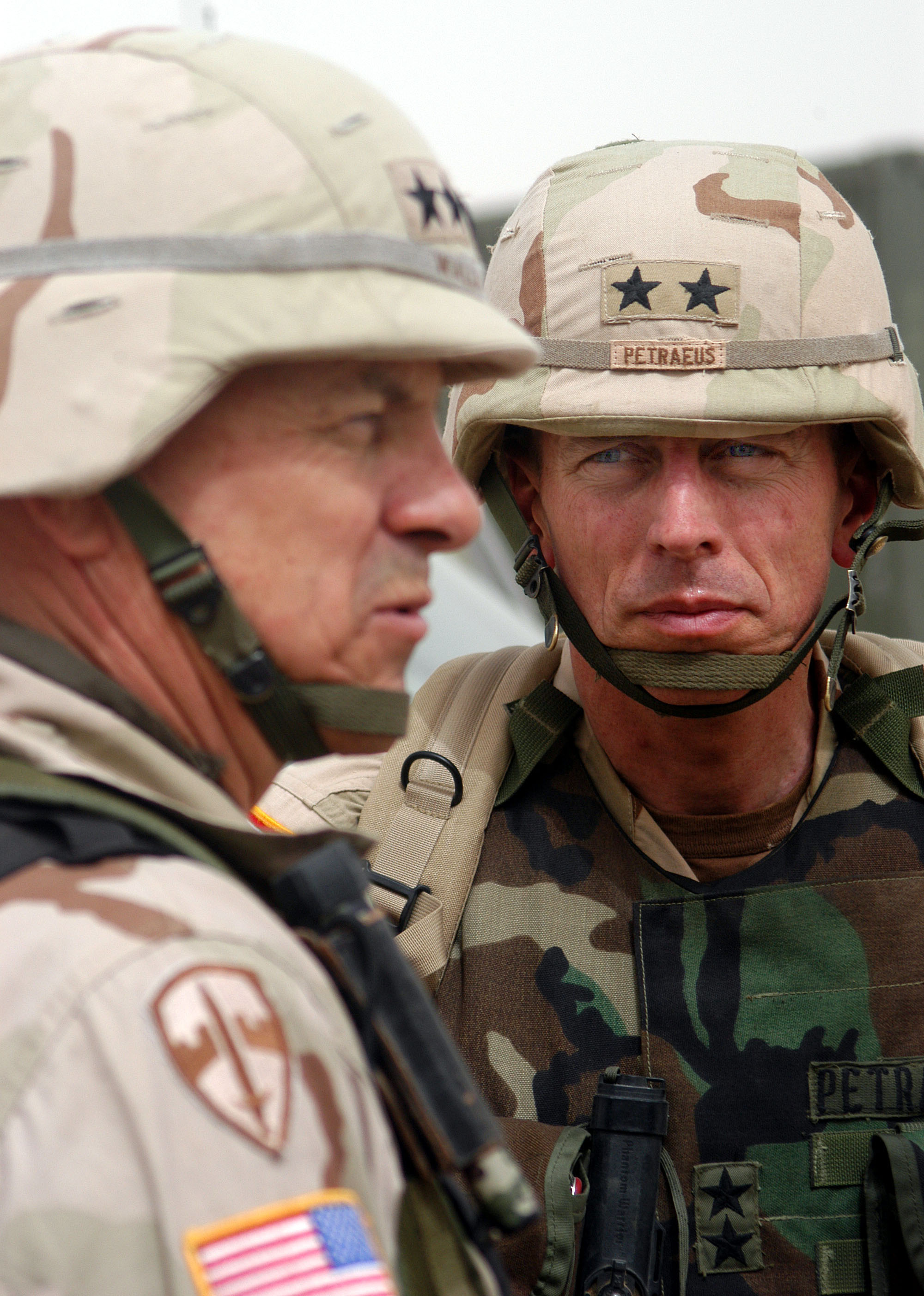
Maj. Gen. David H. Petraeus (right), commanding general, 101st Airborne Division (Air Assault), looks on as Lt. Gen. William S. Wallace, V Corps commanding general speaks to soldiers, 21 March 2003, Kuwait

In 2003, Petraeus, then a major general, saw combat for the first time when he commanded the 101st Airborne Division during V Corps's drive to Baghdad. In a campaign chronicled in detail by Pulitzer Prize-winning author Rick Atkinson of The Washington Post in the book In the Company of Soldiers, Petraeus led his division through fierce fighting south of Baghdad, in Karbala, Hilla and Najaf. Following the fall of Baghdad, the division conducted the longest heliborne assault on record in order to reach Nineveh Governorate, where it would spend much of 2003. The 1st Brigade was responsible for the area south of Mosul, the 2nd Brigade for the city itself, and the 3rd Brigade for the region stretching toward the Syrian border. An often-repeated story of Petraeus's time with the 101st is his asking of embedded The Washington Post reporter Rick Atkinson to "Tell me how this ends", an anecdote he and other journalists have used to portray Petraeus as an early recognizer of the difficulties that would follow the fall of Baghdad.

In Mosul, a city of nearly two million people, Petraeus and the 101st employed classic counterinsurgency methods to build security and stability, including conducting targeted kinetic operations and using force judiciously, jump-starting the economy, building local security forces, staging elections for the city council within weeks of their arrival, overseeing a program of public works, reinvigorating the political process, and launching 4,500 reconstruction projects in Iraq.

This approach can be attributed to Petraeus, who had been steeped in nation-building during his previous tours in nations such as Bosnia and Haiti and thus approached nation-building as a central military mission and who was "prepared to act while the civilian authority in Baghdad was still getting organized", according to Michael Gordon of The New York Times. Some Iraqis gave Petraeus the nickname 'King David', which was later adopted by some of his colleagues. In 2004, Newsweek stated that "It's widely accepted that no force worked harder to win Iraqi hearts and minds than the 101st Airborne Division led by Petraeus."

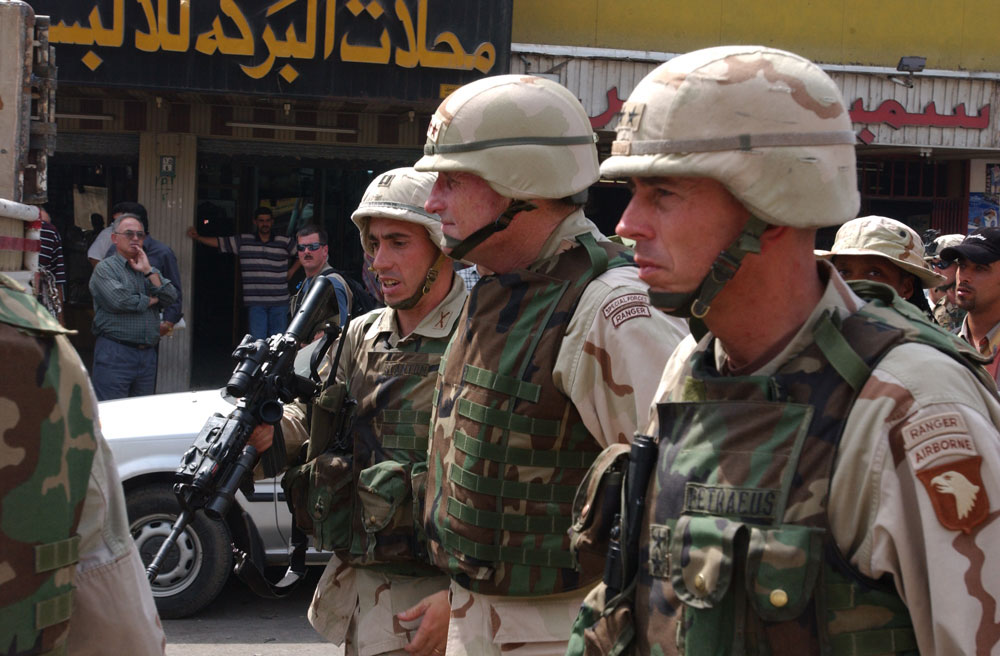
Petraeus on patrol in Mosul with Gen. Peter J. Schoomaker, 2003

One of the General's major public works was the restoration and re-opening of the University of Mosul. Petraeus strongly supported the use of commanders' discretionary funds for public works, telling Coalition Provisional Authority director L. Paul Bremer "Money is ammunition" during the director's first visit to Mosul. Petraeus's often repeated catchphrase was later incorporated into official military briefings and was also eventually incorporated into the U.S. Army Counterinsurgency Field Manual drafted with Petraeus's oversight.

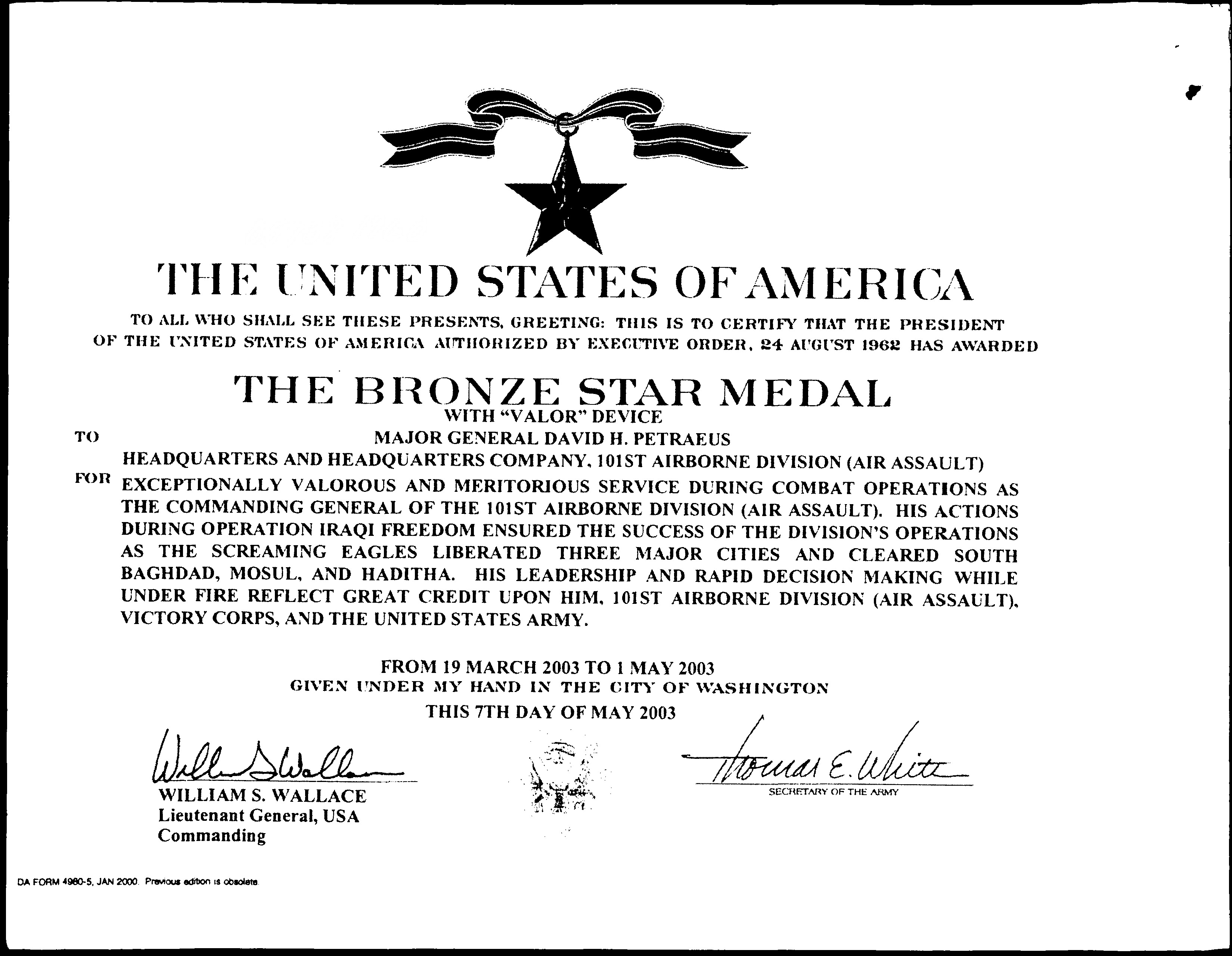
Petraeus's Bronze Star Medal with V Device for actions in combat leading the 101st Airborne (Air Assault) Division during Operation Iraqi Freedom, May 2003

In February 2004, the 101st was replaced in Mosul by a portion of I Corps headquarters, but operational forces consisted solely of a unit roughly one quarter its size—a Stryker brigade. The following summer, the governor of Nineveh Province, Osama Youssef Kashmoula, was assassinated, and most of the Sunni Arab Provincial Council members walked out in the ensuing selection of the new governor, leaving Kurdish members in charge of a predominantly Sunni Arab province. Later that year, the local police commander defected to the Kurdish Minister of Interior in Irbil after repeated assassination attempts against him, attacks on his house, and the kidnapping of his sister. The largely Sunni Arab police collapsed under insurgent attacks launched at the same time Coalition Forces attacked Fallujah in November 2004.

Orders awarding the Combat Action Badge to then LTG David H. Petraeus for actions in combat during Iraqi Freedom

There are differing explanations for the apparent collapse of the police force in Mosul. The Guardian quoted an anonymous U.S. diplomat saying, "Mosul basically collapsed after he [Petraeus] left." Former diplomat Peter Galbraith criticized Petraeus's command of the 101st, saying his achievements had been exaggerated and his reputation inflated. He wrote for The New York Review of Books that "Petraeus ignored warnings from America's Kurdish allies that he was appointing the wrong people to key positions in Mosul's local government and police."

On the other hand, in the book Fiasco, The Washington Post reporter Tom Ricks wrote that "Mosul was quiet while he (Petraeus) was there, and likely would have remained so had his successor had as many troops as he had—and as much understanding of counterinsurgency techniques." Ricks went on to say that "the population-oriented approach Petraeus took in Mosul in 2003 would be the one the entire U.S. Army in Iraq was trying to adopt in 2006".

Time columnist Joe Klein largely agreed with Ricks, writing that the Stryker brigade that replaced the 101st "didn't do any of the local governance that Petraeus had done". Moving away from counterinsurgency principles, "they were occupiers, not builders". The New York Times reporter Michael Gordon and retired General Bernard Trainor echoed Ricks and Klein, including in their book Cobra II a quote that Petraeus "did it right and won over Mosul."

==== Multi-National Security Transition Command – Iraq ====
In June 2004, less than six months after the 101st returned to the U.S., Petraeus was promoted to lieutenant general and became the first commander of the Multi-National Security Transition Command - Iraq. This newly created command had responsibility for training, equipping, and mentoring Iraq's growing army, police, and other security forces, as well as developing Iraq's security institutions and building associated infrastructure, such as training bases, police stations, and border forts.

During Petraeus's fifteen months at the helm of MNSTC-I, he stood up a three-star command virtually from scratch and in the midst of serious fighting in places like Fallujah, Mosul, and Najaf. By the end of his command, some 100,000 Iraqi Security Forces had been trained; Iraqi Army and Police were being employed in combat; countless reconstruction projects had been executed; and hundreds of thousands of weapons, body armor, and other equipment had been distributed in what was described as the "largest military procurement and distribution effort since World War II", at a cost of over $11 billion.

In September 2004, Petraeus wrote an article for The Washington Post in which he described the tangible progress being made in building Iraq's security forces from the ground up while also noting the many challenges associated with doing so. "Although there have been reverses – not to mention horrific terrorist attacks," Petraeus wrote, "there has been progress in the effort to enable Iraqis to shoulder more of the load for their own security, something they are keen to do."

Some of the challenges involved in building security forces had to do with accomplishing this task in the midst of a tough insurgency—or, as Petraeus wrote, "making the mission akin to repairing an aircraft while in flight—and while being shot at". Other challenges included allegations of corruption as well as efforts to improve Iraq's supply accountability procedures. For example, according to former Interim Iraq Governing Council member Ali A. Allawi in The Occupation of Iraq: Winning the War, Losing the Peace, "under the very noses of the security transition command, officials both inside and outside the ministry of defense were planning to embezzle most, if not all, of the procurement budget of the army." The Washington Post stated in August 2007 that the Pentagon had lost track of approximately 30% of weapons supplied to the Iraqi security forces. The General Accounting Office said that the weapons distribution was haphazard, rushed, and did not follow established procedures—particularly from 2004 to 2005, when security training was led by Petraeus and Iraq's security forces began to see combat in places like Najaf and Samarra.

Over a hundred thousand AK-47 assault rifles and pistols were delivered to Iraqi forces without full documentation, and some of the missing weapons may have been abducted by Iraqi insurgents. Thousands of body armour pieces have also been lost. The Independent stated that the military believed "the situation on the ground was so urgent, and the agency responsible for recording the transfers of arms so short-staffed, that field commanders had little choice in the matter." The Pentagon conducted its own investigation, and accountability was subsequently regained for many of the weapons.

Following his second tour in Iraq, Petraeus authored a widely read article in Military Review, listing fourteen observations he had made during two tours in Iraq, including: do not do too much with your own hands, money is ammunition, increasing the number of stakeholders is critical to success, success in a counterinsurgency requires more than just military operations, ultimate success depends on local leaders, there is no substitute for flexible and adaptable leaders, and, finally, a leader's most important task is to set the right tone.

==== Multi-National Force – Iraq (spring 2007) ====
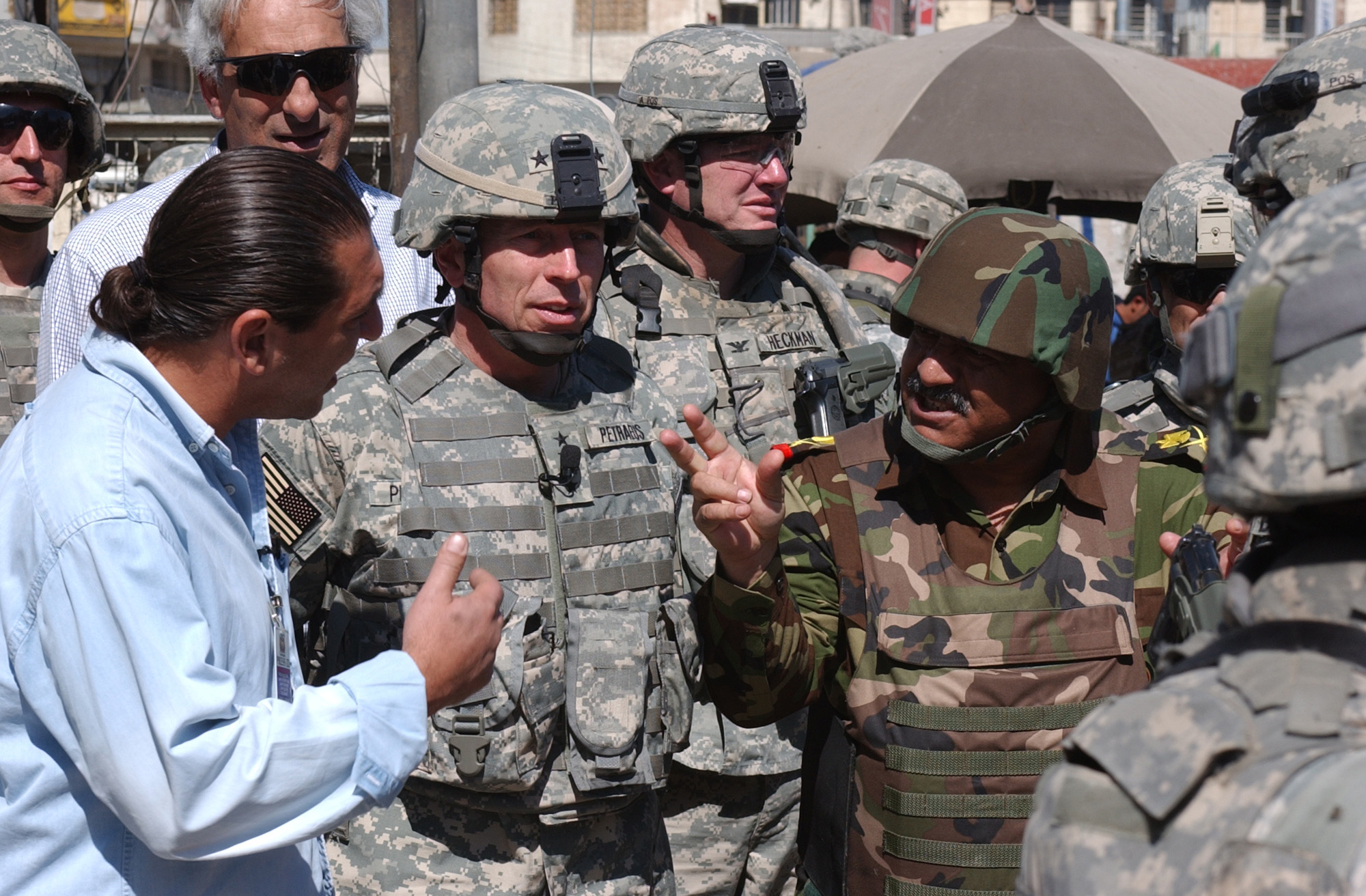
Petraeus walking through a market in Baghdad, March 2007

The intervening time between the Iraq commands was spent at Fort Leavenworth, where Petraeus further developed his military doctrine and pursued an important White House contact in Meghan O'Sullivan who was the principal adviser to the president on the war. In January 2007, as part of his overhauled Iraq strategy, President George W. Bush announced that Petraeus would succeed Gen. George Casey as commanding general of MNF-I to lead all U.S. troops in Iraq. In his memoirs, President Bush likened his selection of Petraeus to the elevations of other great generals of American history, writing, "Lincoln discovered Generals Grant and Sherman. Roosevelt had Eisenhower and Bradley. I found David Petraeus and Ray Odierno."

On 23 January, the Senate Armed Services Committee held Petraeus's nomination hearing, during which he testified on his ideas for Iraq, particularly the strategy underpinning the "surge" of forces. During his opening statement, Petraeus stated that "security of the population, especially in Baghdad, and in partnership with the Iraqi Security Forces, will be the focus of the military effort." He went on to state that security would require establishing a persistent presence, especially in Iraq's most threatened neighborhoods. He also noted the critical importance of helping Iraq increase its governmental capacity, develop employment programs, and improve daily life for its citizens.

Throughout Petraeus's tenure in Iraq, Multi-National Force-Iraq endeavored to work with the Government of Iraq to carry out this strategy that focused on securing the population. Doing so required establishing—and maintaining—persistent presence by living among the population, separating reconcilable Iraqis from irreconcilable enemies, relentlessly pursuing the enemy, taking back sanctuaries and then holding areas that had been cleared, and continuing to develop Iraq's security forces and to support local security forces, often called Sons of Iraq, and integrate them into the Iraqi Army and Police and other employment programs.

The strategy underpinning the "surge" of forces, as well as the ideas Petraeus included in U.S. Army Field Manual 3–24, Counterinsurgency, have been referred to by some journalists and politicians as the "Petraeus Doctrine", although the surge itself was proposed a few months before Petraeus took command. Despite the misgivings of most Democratic and a few Republican senators over the proposed implementation of the "Petraeus Doctrine" in Iraq, specifically regarding the troop surge, Petraeus was unanimously confirmed as a four-star general and MNF-I commander on 27 January.

Before leaving for Iraq, Petraeus recruited a number of highly educated military officers, nicknamed "Petraeus guys" or "designated thinkers", to advise him as commander, including Col. Mike Meese, head of the Social Sciences Department at West Point and Col. H.R. McMaster, famous for his leadership at the Battle of 73 Easting in the Gulf War and in the pacification of Tal Afar more recently, as well as for his doctoral dissertation on Vietnam-era civil-military relations titled Dereliction of Duty. While most of Petraeus's closest advisers were American military officers, he also hired Lt. Col. David Kilcullen of the Australian Army, who was working for the U.S. State Department. Kilcullen upon his return from Iraq published The Accidental Guerrilla, and has discussed the central front of the war and lessons learned in Iraq in The Washington Post.

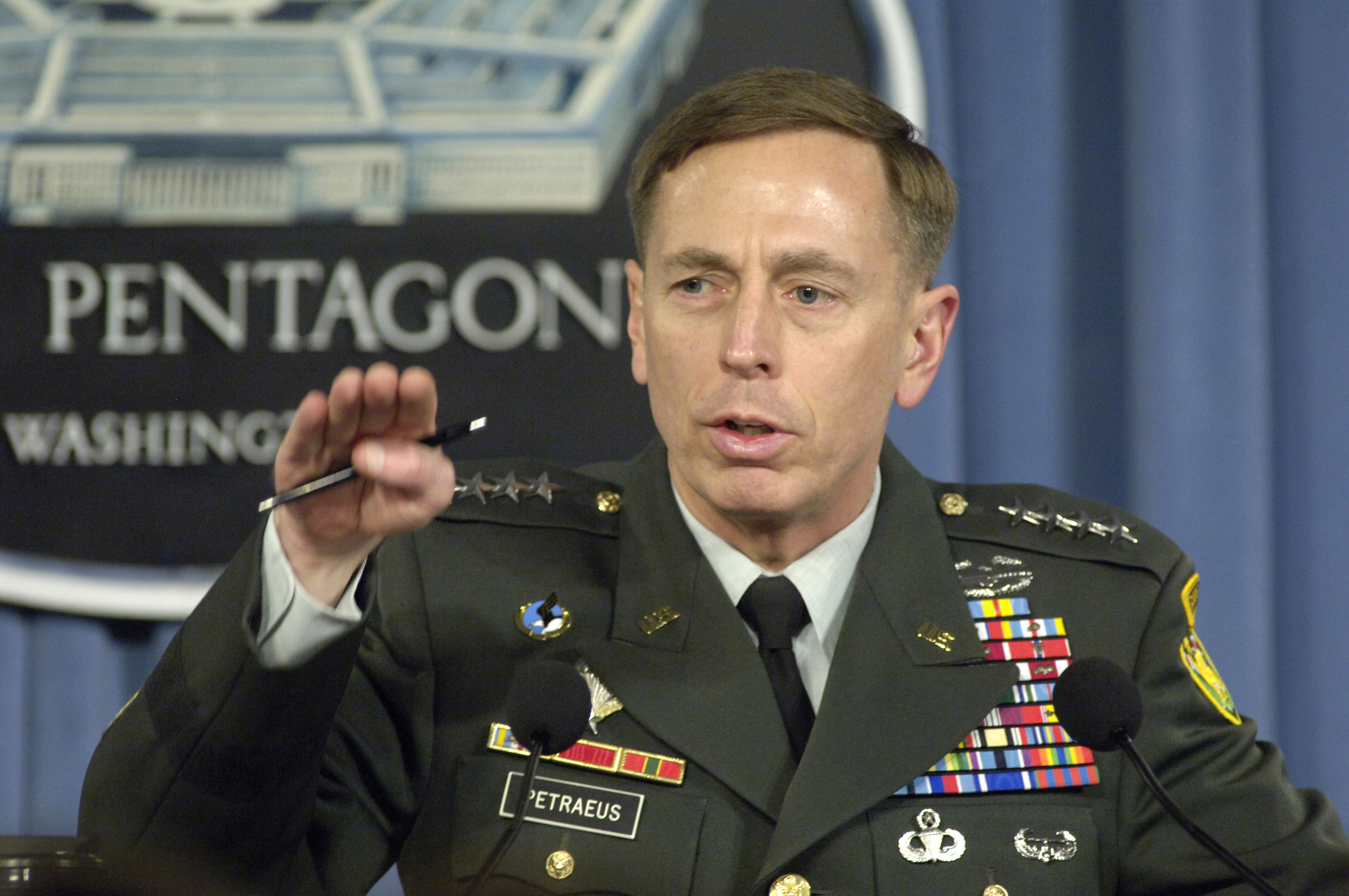
U.S. Army Gen. David H. Petraeus, the commander of Multi-National Force – Iraq, briefs reporters at the Pentagon 26 April 2007, on his view of the current military situation in Iraq.

After taking command of MNF-I on 10 February 2007, Petraeus inspected U.S. and Iraqi units all over Iraq, visiting outposts in greater Baghdad, Tikrit, Baquba, Ramadi, Mosul, Kirkuk, Bayji, Samarra, Basrah and as far west as al-Hit and Al Qaim. In April 2007, Petraeus made his first visit to Washington as MNF-I Commander, reporting to President Bush and Congress on the progress of the "surge" and the overall situation in Iraq. During this visit he met privately with members of Congress and reportedly argued against setting a timetable for U.S. troop withdrawal from Iraq.

By late May 2007, Congress had not imposed any timetables in war funding legislation for troop withdrawal. The enacted legislation did mandate that Petraeus and the U.S. Ambassador to Iraq, Ryan Crocker, deliver a report to Congress by 15 September 2007, detailing their assessment of the military, economic and political situation of Iraq.

In June 2007, Petraeus stated in an interview that there were "astonishing signs of normalcy" in Baghdad, and this comment drew criticism from Senate majority leader Harry Reid. In the same interview, however, Petraeus stated that "many problems remain" and he noted the need to help the Iraqis "stitch back together the fabric of society that was torn during the height of sectarian violence" in late 2006. Petraeus also warned that he expected that the situation in Iraq would require the continued deployment of the elevated troop level of more than 150,000 beyond September 2007; he also stated that U.S. involvement in Iraq could last years afterward.

These statements are representative of the fact that throughout their time in Iraq, Petraeus and Crocker remained circumspect and refused to classify themselves as optimists or pessimists, noting, instead, that they were realists and that the reality in Iraq was very hard. They also repeatedly emphasized the importance of forthright reports and an unvarnished approach. Indeed, Petraeus's realistic approach and assessments were lauded during the McLaughlin Group's 2008 Year-End Awards, when Monica Crowley nominated Petraeus for the most honest person of the year, stating, "[H]e spoke about the great successes of the surge in Iraq, but he always tempered it, never sugar-coated it."

==== Multi-National Force – Iraq (summer and fall 2007) ====
In July 2007, the White House submitted to Congress the interim report on Iraq, which stated that coalition forces had made satisfactory progress on 6 of 18 benchmarks set by Congress. On 7 September 2007, in a letter addressed to the troops he was commanding, Petraeus wrote that much military progress had been made, but that the national-level political progress that was hoped for had not been achieved. Petraeus's Report to Congress on the Situation in Iraq was delivered to Congress on 10 September 2007.

On 15 August 2007, the Los Angeles Times had stated that, according to unnamed administration officials, the report "would actually be written by the White House, with inputs from officials throughout the government." However, Petraeus declared in his testimony to Congress that "I wrote this testimony myself." He further elaborated that his testimony to Congress "has not been cleared by, nor shared with, anyone in the Pentagon, the White House, or Congress."

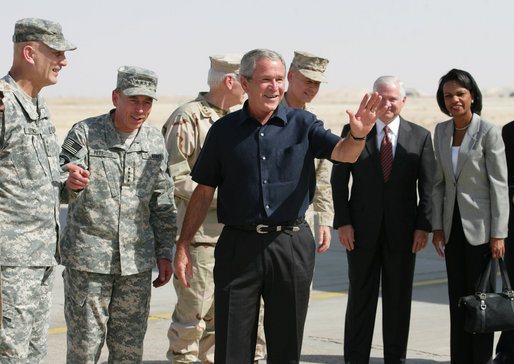
GEN Petraeus with LTG Odierno (left), President Bush (center), SecDef Gates, and SecState Rice (right) at Al Asad Airbase in September 2007

In his September Congressional testimony, Petraeus stated, "As a bottom line up front, the military objectives of the surge are, in large measure, being met." He cited numerous factors for this progress, to include the fact that Coalition and Iraqi Forces had dealt significant blows to Al-Qaeda Iraq and had disrupted Shia militias, that ethno-sectarian violence had been reduced, and that the tribal rejection of Al-Qaeda had spread from Anbar Province to numerous other locations across Iraq. Based on this progress and additional progress expected to be achieved, Petraeus recommended drawing down the surge forces from Iraq and gradually transitioning increased responsibilities to Iraqi Forces, as their capabilities and conditions on the ground permitted.

Democratic Senate Majority Leader Harry Reid of Nevada argued Petraeus's "plan is just more of the same" and "is neither a drawdown or a change in mission that we need." Democratic Representative Robert Wexler of Florida accused Petraeus of "cherry-picking statistics" and "massaging information". Chairman of the House Foreign Affairs Committee Tom Lantos of California called Petraeus and U.S. Ambassador to Iraq Ryan Crocker "two of our nation's most capable public servants" and said Democrats feel "esteem for their professionalism". But he also said that "We can no longer take their assertions on Iraq at face value"; concluding, "We need to get out of Iraq, for that country's sake as well as our own."

Republican Presidential candidate Duncan Hunter called the report "a candid, independent assessment given with integrity". Republican senator Jon Kyl of Arizona stated, "I commend General Petraeus for his honest and forthright assessment of the situation in Iraq." Anti-war Republican senator Chuck Hagel of Nebraska criticized the report while praising Petraeus, saying "It's not your fault, general. ... It's not Ambassador Crocker's fault. It's this administration's fault." A USA Today/Gallup poll taken after Petraeus's report to Congress showed virtually no change in negative public opinion toward the war. A Pew Research Center survey, however, found that most Americans who had heard about the report approved of Petraeus's recommendations.

On 20 September, the Senate passed an amendment by Republican John Cornyn III of Texas designed to "strongly condemn personal attacks on the honor and integrity of General Petraeus". Cornyn drafted the amendment in response to a controversial full-page ad by the liberal group Moveon.org in the 10 September 2007, edition of The New York Times. All forty-nine Republican senators and twenty-two Democratic senators voted in support. The House passed a similar resolution by a 341–79 vote on 26 September.

In December 2007, The Washington Post's "Fact Checker" stated that "While some of Petraeus's statistics are open to challenge, his claims about a general reduction in violence have been borne out over subsequent months. It now looks as if Petraeus was broadly right on this issue at least."

Based on the conditions on the ground, in October 2007, Petraeus and U.S. Ambassador to Iraq Ryan Crocker revised their campaign plan for Iraq. In recognition of the progress made against Al Qaeda Iraq, one of the major points would be "shifting the U.S. military effort to focus more on countering Shiite militias."

==== Multi-National Force – Iraq (spring 2008) ====
On 18 February 2008, USA Today stated that "the U.S. effort has shown more success" and that, after the number of troops reached its peak in fall 2007, "U.S. deaths were at their lowest levels since the 2003 invasion, civilian casualties were down, and street life was resuming in Baghdad." In light of the significant reduction in violence and as the surge brigades began to redeploy without replacement, Petraeus characterized the progress as tenuous, fragile, and reversible and repeatedly reminded all involved that much work remained to be done. During an early February trip to Iraq, Defense Secretary Robert Gates endorsed the idea of a period of consolidation and evaluation upon completion of the withdrawal of surge brigades from Iraq.

Petraeus and Crocker continued these themes at their two full days of testimony before Congress on 8–9 April. During his opening statement, Petraeus stated that "there has been significant but uneven security progress in Iraq", while also noting that "the situation in certain areas is still unsatisfactory and that innumerable challenges remain" and that "the progress made since last spring is fragile and reversible." He also recommended a continuation of the drawdown of surge forces as well as a 45-day period of consolidation and evaluation after the final surge brigade had redeployed in late July. Analysts for USA Today and The New York Times stated that the hearings "lacked the suspense of last September's debate," but they did include sharp questioning as well as both skepticism and praise from various Congressional leaders.

In late May 2008, the Senate Armed Services Committee held nomination hearings for Petraeus and Lieutenant General Ray Odierno to lead United States Central Command and Multi-National Force-Iraq, respectively. During the hearings, Committee Chairman Carl Levin praised these two men, stating that "we owe Gen. Petraeus and Gen. Odierno a debt of gratitude for the commitment, determination and strength that they brought to their areas of responsibility. And regardless of how long the administration may choose to remain engaged in the strife in that country, our troops are better off with the leadership these two distinguished soldiers provide."

During his opening statement, Petraeus discussed four principles that would guide his efforts if confirmed as CENTCOM Commander: seeking to strengthen international partnerships; taking a "whole of government" approach; pursuing comprehensive efforts and solutions; and, finally, both supporting efforts in Iraq and Afghanistan and ensuring readiness for possible contingency operations in the future. Petraeus also noted that during the week before his testimony, the number of security incidents in Iraq was the lowest in over four years. After Petraeus's return to Baghdad, and despite the continued drawdown of surge forces as well as recent Iraqi-led operations in places like Basrah, Mosul, and Baghdad, the number of security incidents in Iraq remained at their lowest level in over four years.

==== Multi-National Force – Iraq (summer and fall 2008) ====
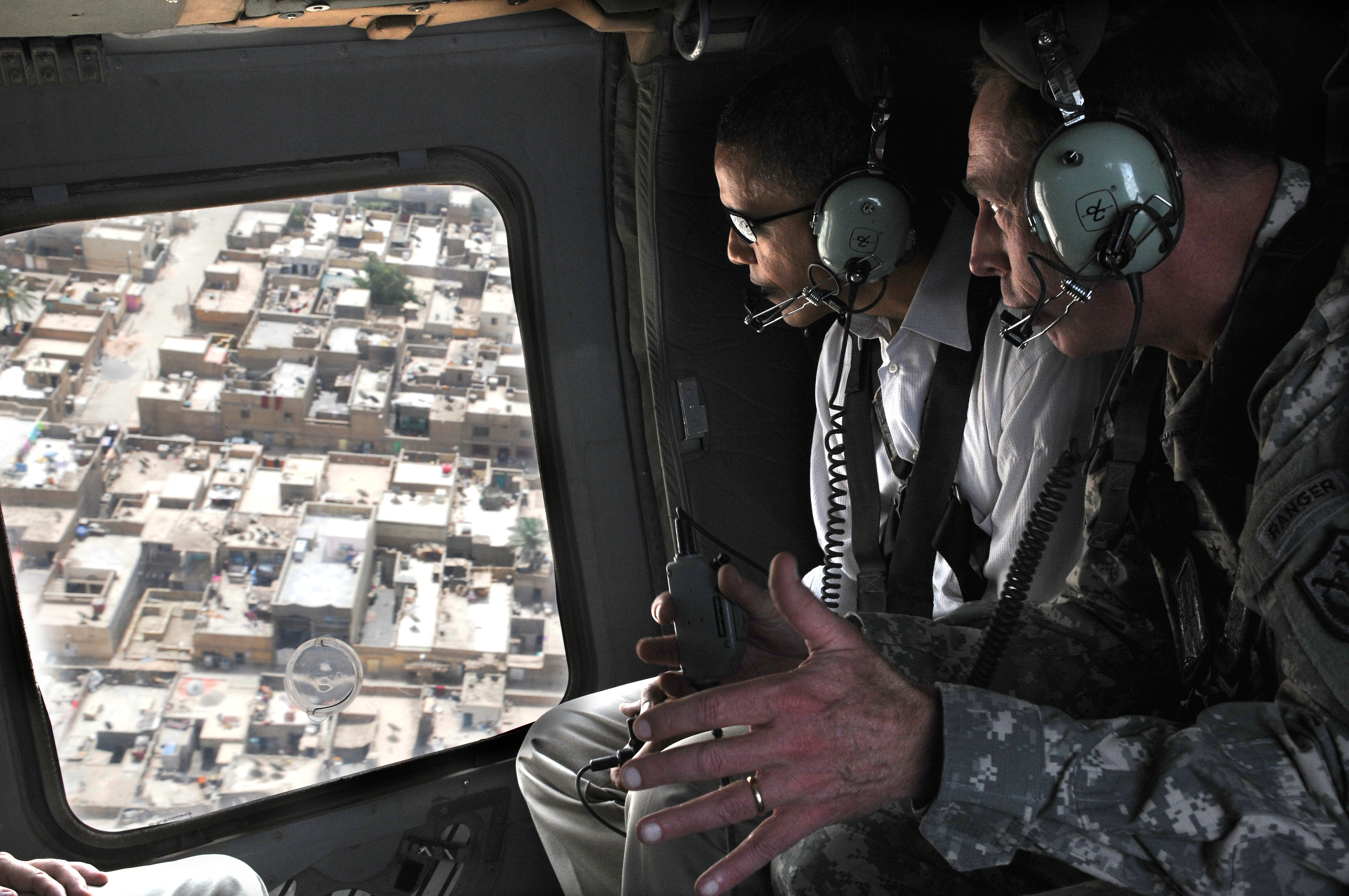
Petraeus explains security improvements in Sadr City while giving an aerial tour of Baghdad to Senator Barack Obama, July 2008

In September 2008, Petraeus gave an interview to BBC News stating that he did not think using the term "victory" in describing the Iraq war was appropriate, saying "This is not the sort of struggle where you take a hill, plant the flag and go home to a victory parade ... it's not war with a simple slogan."

Petraeus had discussed the term 'victory' before in March 2008, saying to NPR News that "an Iraq that is at peace with itself, at peace with its neighbors, that has a government that is representative of—and responsive to—its citizenry and is a contributing member of the global community" could arguably be called 'victory'. On the eve of his change of command, in September 2008, Petraeus stated that "I don't use terms like victory or defeat ... I'm a realist, not an optimist or a pessimist. And the reality is that there has been significant progress but there are still serious challenges."

==== Change of command ====
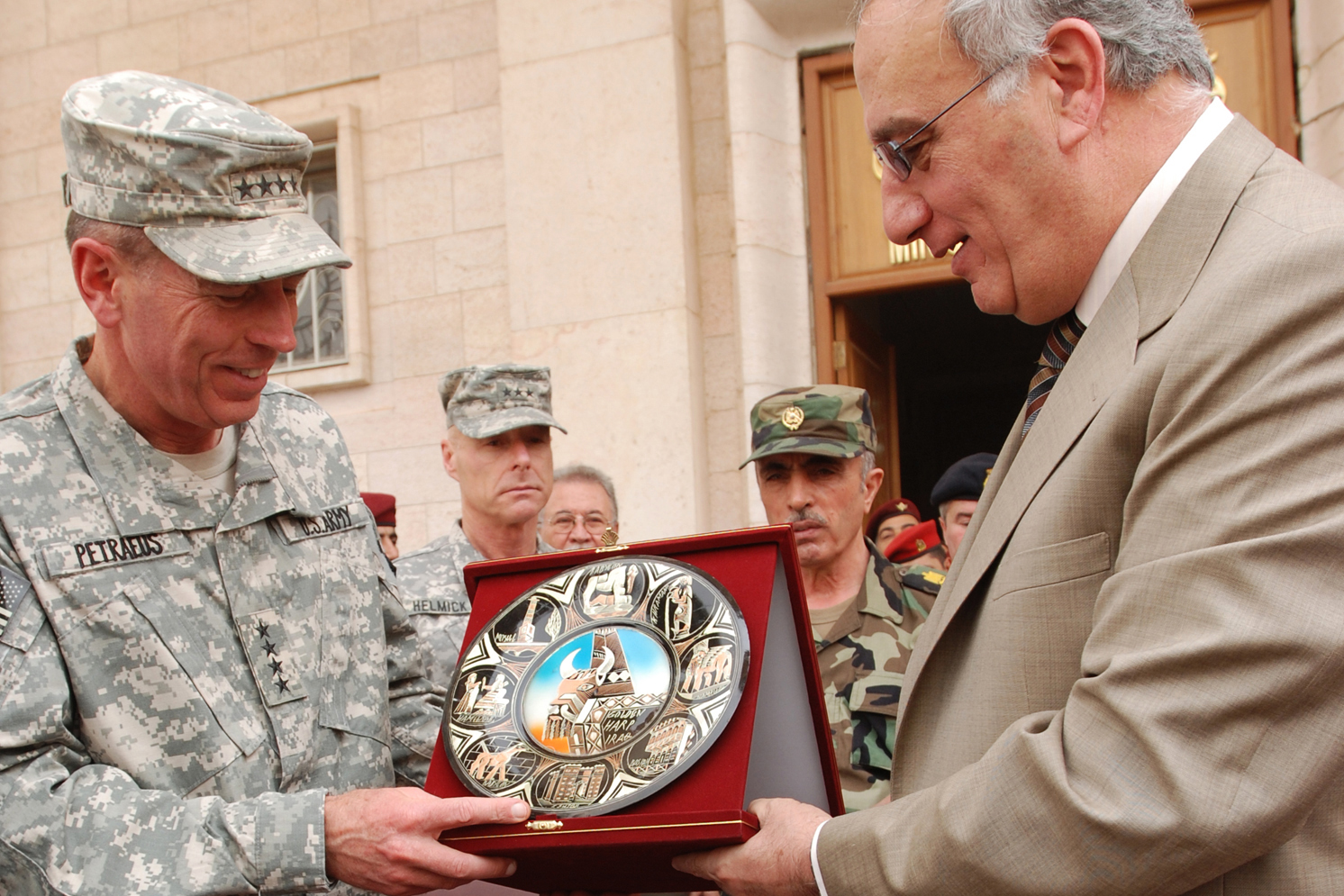
Iraq Defense Minister Abdul Qadir presents a gift to Petraeus during a farewell ceremony in Baghdad in September 2008

On 16 September 2008, Petraeus formally gave over his command in Iraq to General Raymond T. Odierno in a government ceremony presided by Defense Secretary Robert Gates. During the ceremony, Gates stated that Petraeus "played a historic role" and created the "translation of a great strategy into a great success in very difficult circumstances". Gates also told Petraeus he believed "history will regard you as one of our nation's greatest battle captains." He presented Petraeus with the Defense Distinguished Service Medal. At the event, Petraeus mentioned the difficulty in getting the Sons of Iraq absorbed into the central Government of Iraq and warned about future consequences if the effort stalled.

When speaking of these and other challenges, Petraeus noted that "the gains [achieved in Iraq] are tenuous and unlikely to survive without an American effort that outlasts his tenure." Even so, as Petraeus departed Iraq, it appeared to many that he was leaving a much different Iraq than the one that existed when he took command in February 2007. As described by Dexter Filkins, "violence has plummeted from its apocalyptic peaks, Iraqi leaders are asserting themselves, and streets that once seemed dead are flourishing with life." The 3 January 2009, Iraq Trends (a chart produced weekly by the MNF-I) seemed to illustrate an increase in incidents followed by the sharp decline described by Dexter Filkens and others.

Petraeus' command of coalition forces during the Surge in Iraq was lauded by a number of observers. In his book The Savior Generals historian Victor Davis Hanson wrote, "that without David Petraeus, the American effort in Iraq—along with the reputation of the U.S. military in the Middle East—would have been lost long ago." In her introduction of Petraeus at the Baccalaureate ceremony for the Class of 2009 at Princeton University, President Shirley Tilghman described his accomplishments. While acknowledging that much remained to be accomplished in Iraq, Tilghman paid tribute to Petraeus's "leadership in rethinking American military strategy through his principles of counterinsurgency," which are, she said, "eliminating 'simplistic definitions of victory and defeat in favor of incremental and nuanced progress'."

=== U.S. Central Command (fall 2008 to summer 2010) ===
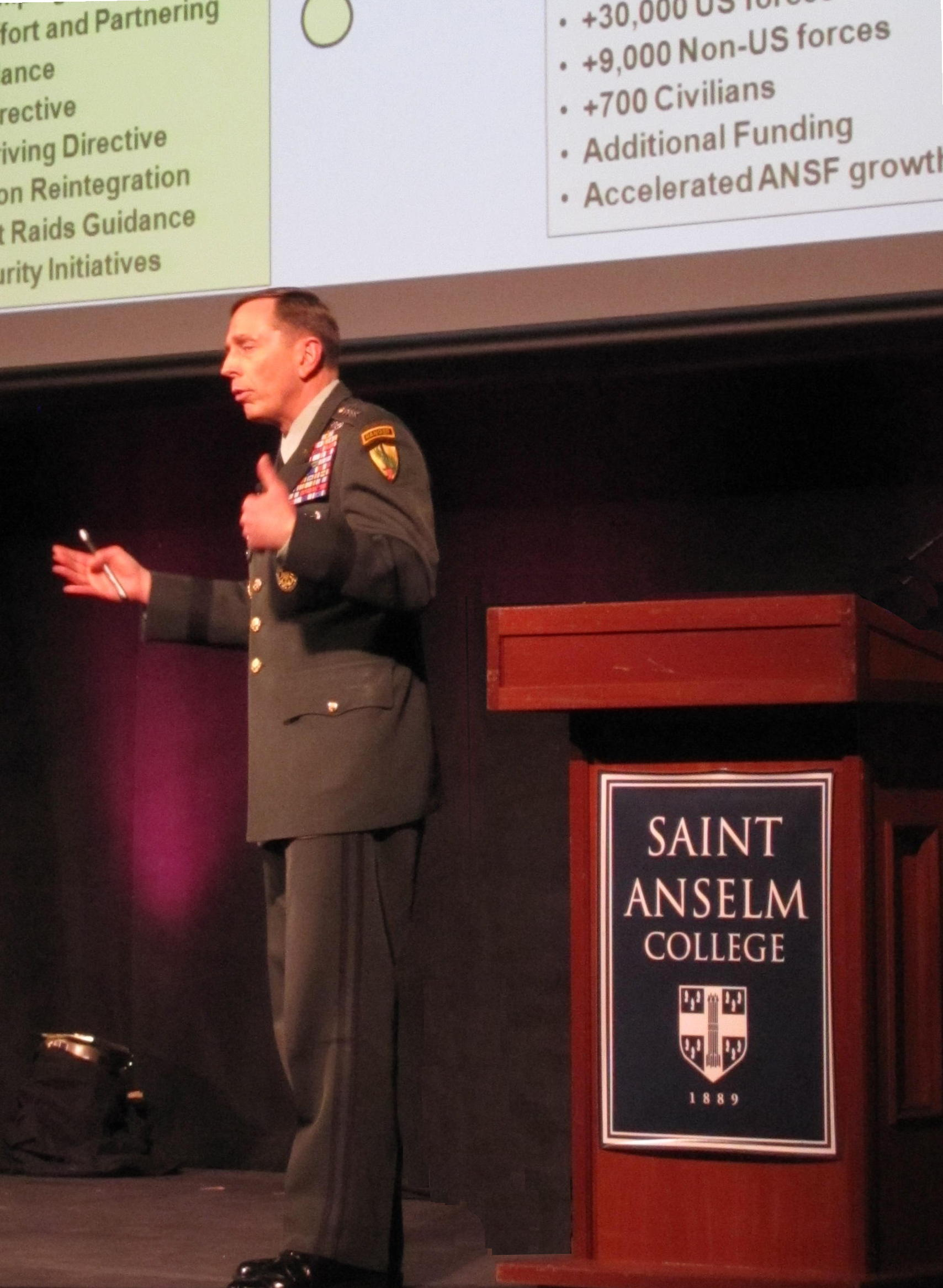
Gen. David H. Petraeus speaking at the New Hampshire Institute of Politics at Saint Anselm College

On 31 October 2008, Petraeus assumed command of the United States Central Command (USCENTCOM) headquartered in Tampa, Florida. Petraeus was responsible for U.S. operations in 20 countries spreading from Egypt to Pakistan—including Operations Iraqi Freedom and Enduring Freedom. During his time at CENTCOM, Petraeus advocated that countering the terrorist threats in the CENTCOM region required more than just counter-terrorism forces, demanding instead whole-of-government, comprehensive approaches akin to those of counterinsurgency. One of his closest colleagues said that Petraeus knew that defeating an insurgency required living among the people, convincing them that we were better than the insurgents. "[Y]ou can't kill 'em all ... [Y]ou can't kill your way out of an insurgency. ... You have to find other kinds of ammunition, and it's not always a bullet."

Petraeus reiterated this view in a 2009 interview published in Parade magazine. In an interview for Newsweek magazine's "Interview Issue: The View From People Who Make a Difference," Petraeus expressed his support for President Obama's announced Afghanistan strategy and discussed his view that reconciliation efforts in Afghanistan should for the time being occur "at the lower and midlevels".

In mid-August 2009, Petraeus established the Afghanistan-Pakistan Center of Excellence within the USCENTCOM Directorate of Intelligence to provide leadership to coordinate, integrate and focus analysis efforts in support of operations in Afghanistan and Pakistan.

During a February 2010 World Affairs Council event in Philadelphia, General Petraeus discussed the ways in which diplomacy, history, and culture impact overall military strategy, then explained how these issues informed the U.S. approach to counterinsurgencies in Iraq and Afghanistan.

On 16 March 2010, in testimony to the Senate Armed Services Committee, Petraeus described the continuing Israeli–Palestinian conflict as a challenge to U.S. interests in the region. According to the testimony, the conflict was "fomenting anti-American sentiment" due to "a perception of U.S. favoritism for Israel". This was widely commented on in the media. When questioned by journalist Philip Klein, Petraeus said the original reporter "picked apart" and "spun" his speech. He said he believed there were many important factors standing in the way of peace, including "a whole bunch of extremist organizations, some of which by the way deny Israel's right to exist. There's a country that has a nuclear program who denies that the Holocaust took place. So again we have all these factors in there. This [Israel] is just one."

In March 2010, Petraeus visited the New Hampshire Institute of Politics at Saint Anselm College to speak about Iraq and Afghanistan. Petraeus spoke a few days after the seventh anniversary of the U.S. invasion of Iraq, noting the successful changes in Iraq since the U.S. troop surge. The visit to Saint Anselm created rumors that Petraeus was contemplating a run for the presidency; however, he denied the speculation, saying that he was not aware that the college had been the site of numerous presidential debates.

Toward the close of his tenure as CENTCOM Commander, including in his interview published in Vanity Fair, Petraeus discussed the effort to determine and send to Afghanistan the right "inputs" for success there; these inputs included several structures and organizations that proved important in Iraq, including "an engagement cell to support reconciliation ... a finance cell to go after financing of the enemy ... [a] really robust detainee-operations task force, a rule-of-law task force, an energy-fusion cell—all these other sort of nonstandard missions that are very important."

On 5 May 2010, The New York Times published an article suggesting there was mounting evidence of a Taliban role in the Times Square bombing plot. On 7 May 2010, Petraeus announced that Times Square bombing suspect Faisal Shahzad was a "lone wolf" terrorist who did not work with others. On 10 May 2010, Attorney General Eric Holder said that the evidence showed the Pakistani Taliban directed this plot.

==== Health ====
General Petraeus was diagnosed with early-stage prostate cancer in February 2009 and underwent two months of successful radiation treatment at Walter Reed Army Medical Center. The diagnosis and treatment were not publicly disclosed until October 2009 because Petraeus and his family regarded his illness as a personal matter that did not interfere with the performance of his duties.

On 15 June 2010, Petraeus momentarily fainted while being questioned by the Senate Armed Services Committee. He quickly recovered and was able to walk and exit the room without assistance. He attributed the episode to possible dehydration.

=== Commander of U.S. and ISAF forces in Afghanistan (2010–2011) ===
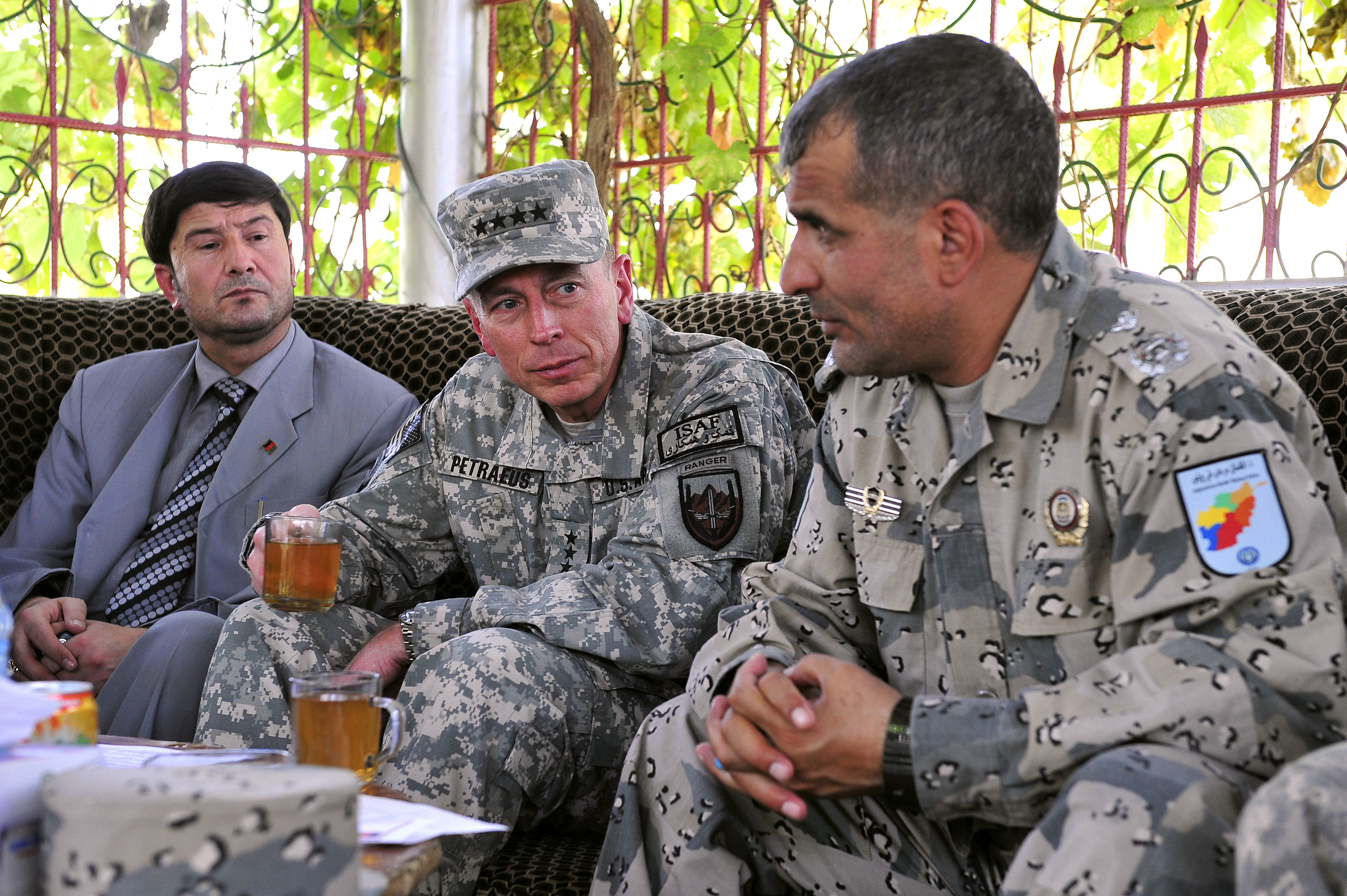
Petraeus having tea with the Afghan Border Police Commander at the border with Uzbekistan

On 23 June 2010, Obama announced that he would nominate Petraeus to succeed General Stanley A. McChrystal as the commander of U.S. Forces in Afghanistan. The change of command was prompted by McChrystal's comments about the Obama administration and its policies in Afghanistan during an interview with Rolling Stone magazine. The nomination was technically a positional step down from his position as commander of Central Command; however, the President said that he believed that he was the best man for the job. After being confirmed by the Senate on 30 June, Petraeus formally assumed command on 4 July.

During the assumption-of-command remarks, Petraeus provided his vision and goals to NATO, the members of his command, and his Afghan partners. As he was known to do while the commander in Iraq, Petraeus delivered his first Letter to the Troops on the same day he assumed command.

In December 2009, then President Obama announced that there would be a 30,000 troop surge in Afghanistan, but that in 18 months there would be a troop drawdown to take these forces out of the country again. Petraeus later shared his surprise at this decision, noting that he didn't agree with the choice to announce a drawdown given that it limited bargaining power with the enemy.

On 1 August 2010, shortly after the disclosure of the Afghan war logs on WikiLeaks, which included reports of high civilian deaths and increased Taliban attacks, Petraeus issued his updated Tactical Directive for the prevention of civilian casualties, providing guidance and intent for the use of force by the U.S. military units operating in Afghanistan (replacing the 1 July 2009, version). This directive reinforced the concept of "disciplined use of force in partnership with Afghan Security Forces" in the fight against insurgent forces.

We must never forget that the center of gravity in this struggle is the Afghan people; it is they who will ultimately determine the future of Afghanistan ... Prior to the use of fires, the commander approving the strike must determine that no civilians are present. If unable to assess the risk of civilian presence, fires are prohibited, except under of the following two conditions (specific conditions deleted due to operational security; however, they have to do with the risk to ISAF and Afghan forces).

In the October 2010 issue of Army Magazine, Petraeus discussed changes that had taken place over the previous 18 months, including sections discussing "setting the conditions for progress", "capitalizing on the conditions for progress", "improving security", "supporting governance expansion", "promoting economic development", "reducing corruption", and "our troopers: carrying out a difficult mission".

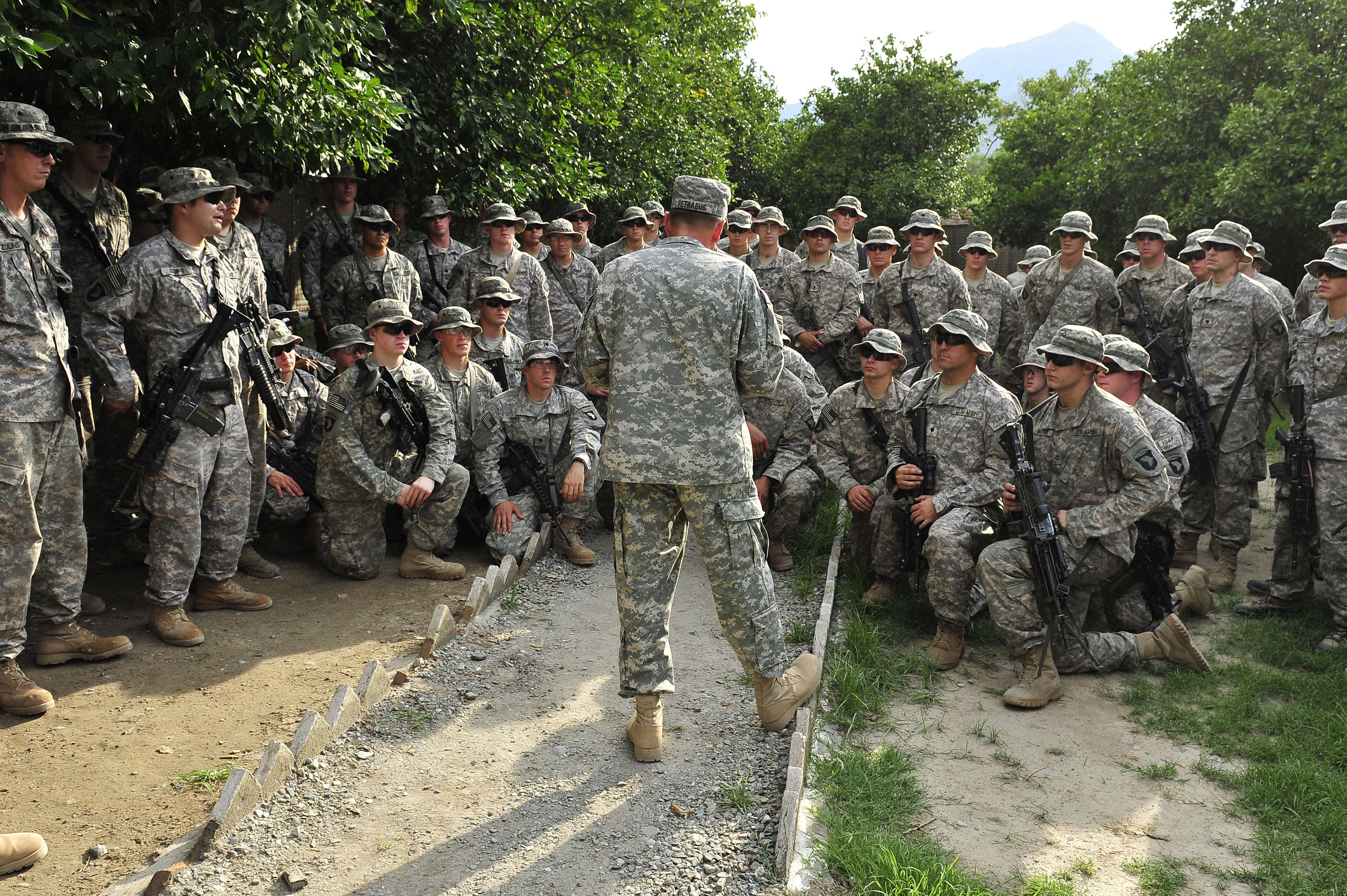
Petraeus talks with U.S. soldiers at Combat Outpost Monti in eastern Afghanistan in August 2010

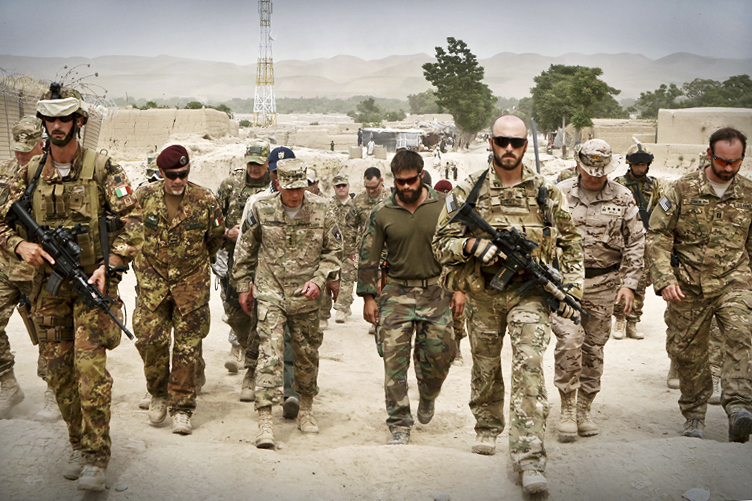
Petraeus visits Regional Command West in Afghanistan, May 2011

Sources interviewed by Steve Coll were critical of aspects of Petraeus's tenure as ISAF commander. Some described Petraeus as being physically exhausted from his previous tours abroad (as well as his recovery from prostate cancer), having a proclivity to see Afghanistan through the prism of his experience in Iraq—to the point of occasionally referring to Afghanistan as "Iraq"—and being slow to react to "green-on-blue" or "insider attacks" by Afghan soldiers against their American partners. Petraeus sought to recreate the "Sunni Awakening" in Iraq by offering financial inducements to former Taliban insurgents to integrate into Hamid Karzai's government, but the results were not impressive.

As commander in Afghanistan, Petraeus joined President Obama as a primary target for Osama bin Laden. After his death, documents recovered from bin Laden's compound unveiled a plot to assassinate the two men as they traveled by plane. Bin Laden's communications with a top deputy stated, "The reason for concentrating on them is that Obama is the head of infidelity and killing him automatically will make [Vice President] Biden take over the presidency. Biden is totally unprepared for that post, which will lead the U.S. into a crisis. As for Petraeus, he is the man of the hour ... and killing him would alter the war's path" in Afghanistan.

In early March 2011, Petraeus made a "rare apology" following a NATO helicopter airstrike under his command that resulted in the deaths of nine Afghan boys and the wounding of a 10th, as they gathered firewood in Eastern Afghanistan. In a statement, Petraeus apologized to the members of the Afghan government, the people of Afghanistan, and the surviving family members, and said, "These deaths should have never happened." Several journalists and observers noted the humanitarian candor in Petraeus's open regrets. Petraeus relinquished command of U.S. and NATO forces in Afghanistan on 18 July 2011. He received the Defense Distinguished Service Medal and the NATO Meritorious Service Medal for his service.

=== Retirement from the U.S. Army (2011) ===
Petraeus retired from the U.S. Army on 31 August 2011. His retirement ceremony was held at Joint Base Myer–Henderson Hall. During this ceremony, he was awarded the Army Distinguished Service Medal by Deputy Secretary of Defense William J. Lynn. During the ceremony, Lynn noted that Petraeus had played an important role as both a combat leader and strategist in the post-9/11 world. Lynn also cited General Petraeus's efforts in current counter insurgency strategy.

Admiral Michael Mullen, Chairman of the Joint Chiefs of Staff in his remarks compared General Petraeus to Ulysses S. Grant, John J. Pershing, George Marshall and Dwight D. Eisenhower as one of the great battle captains of American history. With his four-star rank, Petraeus receives an annual pension of about $220,000.

=== Dates of rank ===
Promotions
Rank	Date
Second Lieutenant	5 June 1974
First Lieutenant	5 June 1976
Captain	8 August 1978
Major	1 August 1985
Lieutenant Colonel	1 April 1991
Colonel	1 September 1995
Brigadier General	1 January 2000
Major General	1 January 2003
Lieutenant General	18 May 2004
General	10 February 2007

== CIA director (2011–2012) ==
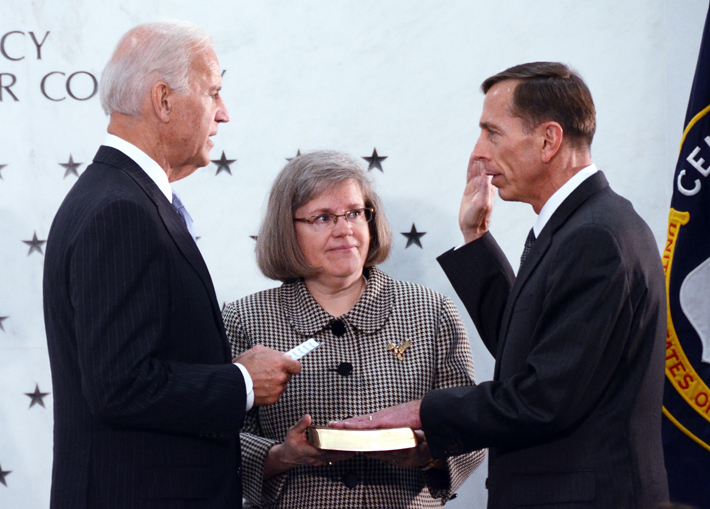
Petraeus sworn in at the CIA Headquarters as his wife, Holly, looks on

On 28 April 2011, President Barack Obama announced that he had nominated Petraeus to become the new Director of the Central Intelligence Agency. The nomination was confirmed by the United States Senate 94–0 on 30 June 2011. Petraeus was sworn in at the White House on 6 September and then ceremonially sworn in by Vice President Joe Biden at CIA Headquarters in Langley, Virginia on 11 October 2011.

Petraeus's tenure at the CIA was more low profile than that of his predecessor, Leon Panetta, declining to give media interviews while director and speaking to Congress in closed sessions. He also differed from Panetta in management style, as an article in The New York Times published just days before his resignation said; Panetta "wooed the work force and often did not question operational details, [while] Petraeus is a demanding boss who does not hesitate to order substandard work redone or details of plans adjusted". Petraeus's philosophy on leadership at the time was summarized in a twelve-point article published by Newsweek on 5 November 2012.

Although Petraeus was given good marks by most observers for his work heading the CIA, during October 2012 some critics took issue with the availability of accurate information from the CIA concerning an attack in Benghazi, Libya, the month prior. By the 11th of September, four Americans had been killed, including the ambassador, and more than thirty evacuated. Only seven of those evacuated did not work for the CIA. According to a Wall Street Journal story, other government agencies complained about being left "largely in the dark about the CIA's role," with Secretary of State Hillary Clinton telephoning Petraeus directly the night of the attacks seeking assistance. Although the "State Department believed it had a formal agreement with the CIA to provide backup security," "the CIA didn't have the same understanding about its security responsibilities," reported The Wall Street Journal.

=== Petraeus scandal ===
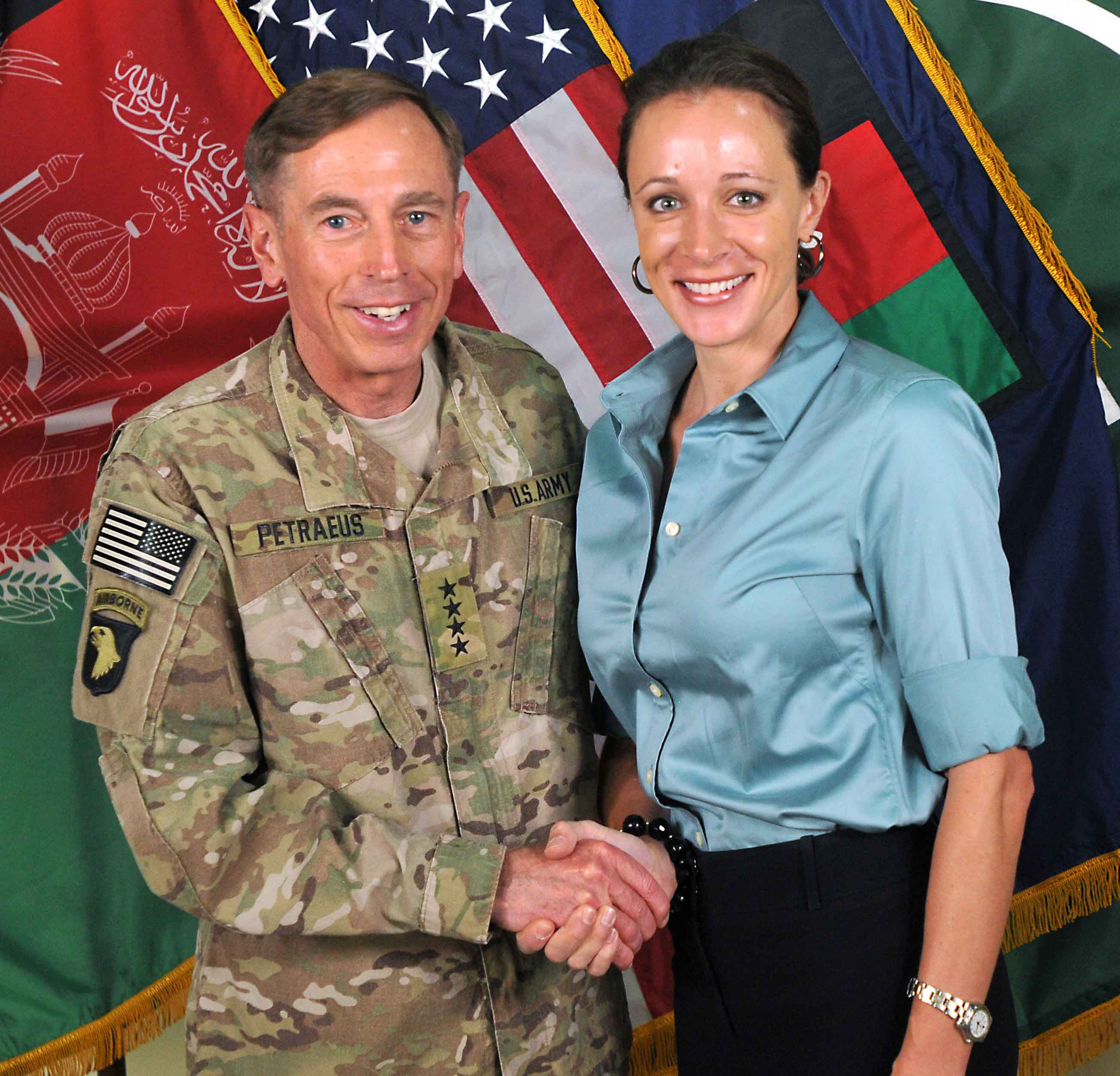
Petraeus with Paula Broadwell in July 2011

Petraeus reportedly began an affair with Paula Broadwell, principal author of his biography, All In: The Education of General David Petraeus, after Petraeus left his ISAF command on 18 July 2011, to become CIA director. Petraeus reportedly ended the affair in the summer of 2012, around the time that he learned that Broadwell had been sending harassing emails to a longstanding family friend of the Petraeuses, Jill Kelley.

Kelley, a Florida socialite who frequently entertained senior military personnel at her and her husband's Tampa mansion, had approached an acquaintance who worked for the FBI Tampa Field Office in the late spring with regard to anonymous emails she considered threatening. The Bureau traced the emails to Broadwell, and noted that Broadwell appeared to be exchanging intimate messages with an email account belonging to Petraeus, which instigated an investigation into whether that account had been hacked into or was someone posing as Petraeus. According to an Associated Press report, rather than transmit emails to each other's inbox, which would have left a more obvious email trail, Petraeus and Broadwell left messages in a draft folder and the draft messages were then read by the other person when they logged into the same account.

Although U.S. Attorney General Eric Holder was aware that the FBI had discovered the affair, it was not until 6 November 2012, that Petraeus's nominal superior, Director of National Intelligence James R. Clapper, was advised. That same evening Clapper called Petraeus and urged him to resign. Clapper notified the White House the next day, 7 November. After being briefed the following day, Obama summoned Petraeus to the White House where Petraeus offered his resignation. Obama accepted his resignation on 9 November, and Petraeus cited his affair when announcing that same day that he would resign as CIA Director. Eventually, Petraeus pleaded guilty to a misdemeanor charge of mishandling the classified information that he provided to his mistress and biographer.

==== Criticism after 2012 scandal ====
On 13 November 2012, Reagan administration Assistant Secretary of Defense Lawrence Korb, CIA analyst and Veteran Intelligence Professionals for Sanity co-founder Ray McGovern, and investigative journalist Gareth Porter appeared on Al Jazeera English. Together they assessed the general's extensive military-media strategy, linking his writings on counterguerrilla operations and subsequent military media efforts to his downfall with his female biographer. Critics said that the Petraeus media strategy would prove damaging for American policy in the future because of omissions and distorted interpretations that Washington policymakers, other experts, and the American public accepted from Petraeus's media contacts.

Military historians have noted the absence of field records for the Iraq and Afghanistan military campaigns, but have not been personally critical of the commanders in theater.

==== Criminal charges and probation ====
In January 2015, The New York Times reported that the FBI and the DOJ had recommended bringing felony charges against Petraeus for providing classified information to Broadwell. Petraeus denied the allegations and was reported to have had no interest in a plea deal. However, on 3 March 2015, the DOJ announced that Petraeus agreed to plead guilty in federal court in Charlotte, North Carolina, to a charge of unauthorized removal and retention of classified information.

In the 15-page statement of facts filed by the government along with the plea agreement, the government stated that Petraeus had provided Broadwell access to documents containing top secret sensitive compartmented information, had later moved those documents to his personal residence and stored them in an unsecured drawer, and had deliberately and intentionally lied to federal investigators about both providing Broadwell access to the documents and their improper storage. These facts were acknowledged to be true by Petraeus as part of his plea agreement.

On 23 April 2015, a federal judge sentenced Petraeus to two years' probation plus a fine of $100,000. The fine was more than double the amount the Justice Department had requested.

Press accounts in January 2016 indicated that Department of Defense staff were reviewing Department of Justice documents from the Petraeus prosecution and considering whether to recommend to the Secretary of Defense that Petraeus be demoted on the Army's retired list. Laws and regulations indicate that members of the military are retired at the last rank in which they are deemed to have served successfully; Petraeus's admission of an extramarital affair and guilty plea with regard to removing and retaining classified information while serving in the grade of general could be grounds for reduction in rank to lieutenant general. The matter was reviewed by then-Secretary of the Army John M. McHugh before he left office in October 2015; he recommended no further action. On 29 January, press accounts indicated that Stephen C. Hedger, Assistant Secretary of Defense for Legislative Affairs, had written to the U.S. Senate Armed Services Committee. In his letter, Hedger informed the committee that Secretary of Defense Ashton Carter had concurred with the Army's recommendation, and would not impose any further punishment on Petraeus.

== Later life ==
Petraeus was named a visiting professor at Macaulay Honors College at the City University of New York in July 2013. According to a statement from Petraeus, "I look forward to leading a seminar at Macaulay that examines the developments that could position the United States—and our North American partners—to lead the world out of the current global economic slowdown." After his anticipated $200,000 salary for the academic year drew fire from critics, Petraeus agreed to take on the teaching position for just $1 in order to keep the focus on the students and away from any monetary controversy. In September 2013 Petraeus was harassed by students at CUNY while walking on campus.

On 1 May 2013, the University of Southern California named Petraeus as a Judge Widney Professor, "a title reserved for eminent individuals from the arts, sciences, professions, business and community and national leadership". The president of the Currahee board of trustees announced 6 May, that Petraeus agreed to serve on the board of trustees that preserves Camp Toccoa. During WWII, four of the main parachute infantry regiments of the Army trained at Camp Toccoa prior to their deployment.

Kohlberg Kravis Roberts & Co. L.P., a New York investment firm, hired Petraeus as chairman of the firm's newly created KKR Global Institute in May 2013. Part of his work would support KKR's investment teams and portfolio companies when studying new investments, especially in new locations.

In October 2013, Petraeus joined Harvard's John F. Kennedy School of Government as a non-resident senior fellow at the Belfer Center for Science and International Affairs. According to the school, Petraeus joined to lead a new project focusing on the technological, scientific and economic dynamics that are spurring renewed North American competitiveness. "The Coming North America Decades" project would analyze how potential policy choices could effect this ongoing transformation. In 2016, the center announced a new project involving Petraeus and focusing on strategic leadership.

General Petraeus was one of the "11 legendary generals" profiled in the 2014 National Geographic Channel feature "American War Generals". In 2015, Petraeus suggested the U.S. should arm members of the terror group Al-Nusra Front (the Syrian branch of Al-Qaeda) in Syria to fight ISIS.

In June 2016, Petraeus and Mark Kelly, a retired NASA astronaut and later senator from Arizona, announced the creation of the now defunct gun control group Veterans Coalition for Common Sense.

Petraeus delivered the inaugural lecture in a series dedicated to his mentor and the former dean of The Fletcher School at Tufts University, General Jack Galvin. He also delivered the inaugural lecture in a series dedicated to Admiral Stansfield Turner at the U.S. Naval War College on 7 August 2018. The lecture series honors the achievements of Turner, who served as the college's president from 1972 to 1974.

As a member of a panel discussion in October 2018 concerning a film documenting the Stars and Stripes newspaper, Petraeus shared his personal experiences with the newspaper with the audience.

Petraeus spoke at the WORLD.MINDS meeting in June 2025 in Washington DC about China, AI and the transatlantic relationship. In September 2025 at the Concordia Annual Summit, Petraeus interviewed the President of Syria, Ahmed al-Sharaa. During the discussion, Petraeus described himself as one of al-Sharaa's "fans".

On 15 April 2026, Petraeus was named a founding member of the ARES Military Expert Council (Allied Reform and Expert Support), an international advisory body established by the General Staff of the Armed Forces of Ukraine under the Commander-in-Chief of the Armed Forces of Ukraine Oleksandr Syrskyi. The council, chaired by former Deputy Supreme Allied Commander Europe General Sir Richard Shirreff, was created to facilitate the exchange of advanced Ukrainian and international military experience and to support institutional reforms within the Armed Forces of Ukraine.

On September 13, 2026, Petraeus was Ukraine attending the Yalta European Strategy conference when a Russian drone struck a passenger train at Yahodyn railway station, approximately 2 kilometers from the Polish border. Petraeus was traveling on a separate train that remained at the station at the time of the attack. The diplomatic train carrying former British prime minister Boris Johnson and other European officials had departed the station earlier. Ukrainian Railways said it was "quite likely" that the diplomatic train had been the intended target.

=== Secretary of State consideration ===
On 18 November 2016, The Guardian cited "diplomatic sources" as having said that Petraeus had entered the race for U.S. Secretary of State in the Trump administration. Petraeus confirmed his interest in the position during a BBC Radio 4 interview, stating that he would serve if asked.

Petraeus met with then President-elect Donald Trump at Trump Tower on 28 November to discuss the position and world affairs. Both Petraeus and Trump expressed favorable views of the meeting, with Trump taking to Twitter to announce, "Just met with General Petraeus—was very impressed!" Petraeus joined a short list of potential candidates for the position, including Mitt Romney and Rudy Giuliani.

There was public speculation that his nomination could hurt Trump's administration, but Republican senators John McCain and Lindsey Graham advocated for Petraeus, calling him "an extraordinary pick". Petraeus also received support from Democratic senator Dianne Feinstein, suggesting that Democrats would keep an open mind concerning his confirmation.

On 13 December 2016, Trump officially selected Rex Tillerson for the role of Secretary of State. Petraeus expressed his gratitude for Trump's consideration and deferred to former Secretary of Defense Robert Gates' endorsement when asked his opinion of Tillerson.

=== Business activities ===
Petraeus has worked for KKR since 2013, where he is a partner and chairman of the KKR Global Institute. On 14 April 2025, Petraeus was appointed the chair of US private equity firm KKR's Middle East division. KKR has had a presence in the Persian Gulf since 2009, with offices in both the financial hub of Dubai and Saudi Arabia's capital Riyadh. Petraeus commented, following the announcement, that "the Middle East is emerging as a leading investment powerhouse," and that the firm saw opportunities to invest in or lend to "domestic businesses" in the region.

== Political positions ==
=== Reaction to the decision to withdraw U.S. forces from Afghanistan ===
On 14 April 2021, President Joe Biden announced that all U.S. troops in Afghanistan would be withdrawn from the country by 11 September 2021, against the advice of many of his top generals and many diplomats.

Petraeus has been an outspoken opponent of the U.S.'s strategy for withdrawal from Afghanistan, and the agreements made with the Taliban in preparation thereof. In a Fox News interview on 17 August 2021, Petraeus called former president Donald Trump's decision to release 5,000 detainees of the Taliban held by the Afghanistan government in 2020 flawed and disastrous, with a tragic outcome. In another interview with the Wall Street Journal on 20 August 2021, he noted that the U.S. negotiated with the Taliban expecting to get something in return for withdrawing, which, he said, "didn't work out".

During an interview with Fox News on 12 May 2021, Petraeus discussed his opposition to the withdrawal of U.S. forces in Afghanistan, stating, "I fear that we will come to regret this decision." He warned of the possible psychological effects on Afghan forces following removal of U.S. support, the erosion of Afghan Air Force maintenance, and the risk of a "brutal civil war".

Following a military blitz by the Taliban that ended in the group capturing the country's capital, Kabul, Petraeus again questioned the poor planning of troop withdrawal from the region and reiterated the dangers the world would face from the potential establishment of Al Qaeda or the Islamic State in the Hindu Kush. In an email interview with Die Weltwoche, Petraeus stated "I do not believe that either terrorist group will pose a near-term threat to the U.S. homeland or our NATO allies. The longer-term threat will depend on our ability to identify, disrupt, and degrade any such sanctuaries."

Petraeus suggested that the removal of 18,000 contractors who maintained aircraft contributed to the surrender of Afghan government forces who ended up lacking air support against the Taliban. In an interview with Brian Kilmeade Petraeus drew parallels between the U.S. withdrawal from Afghanistan, the Dunkirk evacuation, and the Fall of Saigon. He advised that American forces, drones, and close air support be used to secure Kabul Airport while the U.S. communicates with the Taliban to prevent them from impeding the movement of individuals that are trying to evacuate.

During a discussion with CNN's Peter Bergen, Petraeus predicted that the Taliban would struggle to fund their new government following the withdrawal of U.S. and other donor nation financial support. He suggested that the resultant degradation of basic services and salaries for Afghan workers could ultimately force the Taliban to change their approach with the international community, but that it was too early to tell if the Taliban were reformed.

Discussing the topic with NBC's Lester Holt, he expressed his belief that the Taliban's actions on the ground showed that they were "the same old Taliban", and that he was fairly confident that Al-Qaeda and the Islamic State would be able to re-establish sanctuaries in the region with the Taliban in power. He expressed doubt that the U.S. would become involved in the country while the Taliban was in power, outside of military and intelligence actions to protect U.S. interests, and suggested that even the establishment of an embassy for diplomatic relations would not happen "any time soon".

=== Views on the Russian invasion of Ukraine ===
Petraeus has been vocally critical of Russia's invasion of Ukraine, joining three other retired military generals to form the Strategic Advisory Council for the Defense of Ukraine in July 2022 to provide strategic expertise and operational assistance to Ukrainian forces.

Early in 2022, as tensions mounted between Russia and Ukraine, Petraeus attended a tabletop panel with Admiral Michael Mullen, Michèle Flournoy, and Thomas Donilon to discuss economic sanctions, cyber defenses, and anti-Russian insurgency in Ukraine.

In public appearances and interviews, Petraeus has criticized not only Russia's motives for the invasion, but also the tactics and standards of the country's military effort. In the weeks following the invasion of Ukraine, Petraeus spoke with Jake Tapper and Anderson Cooper, examining Russia's strategy in attempts to seize Kyiv. On 12 March 2022, Petraeus spoke on One Nation with Brian Kilmeade, criticizing the Russian military's failed attempt to achieve a combined arms effect, which, according to Petraeus, wasn't up to the normal standards anticipated by the United States or other NATO countries' militaries. In May 2022, Petraeus commented that, in an attempt to create a stronger Russia, President Putin had instead strengthened the alliance between NATO countries. In a later interview, Petraeus said that the Russian military was nowhere near as good as NATO had thought it would be. He described the Russian military's preferred tactic as that of overwhelming artillery strikes, leading to the question of whether Russia's military valued volume over accuracy. In October 2022, he called Russia's military mobilization in Ukraine "irreversible and disastrous".

In addition to criticisms of Russia's war effort, Petraeus also discussed the negative implications that Russian sanctions have for worldwide financial markets, food supplies, and other commodities, and he commended the Ukrainian military for its impressive counter-attacks, specifically a raid on Russian tanks, the killing of five Russian generals, and the destruction of the Russian warship, Saratov.

In mid- to late 2022, Petraeus spoke further on the Western response to Russia's aggression and the impacts U.S. involvement had on Ukraine's defense. In an interview with CNN's Jim Sciutto regarding Russia's plans to annex more regions in Ukraine, he said that US- and UK-supplied high-mobility artillery rocket systems had prompted Russian forces to relocate their headquarters and fuel supplies, which had significantly slowed Russia's advances in Ukraine. In another interview, he said that Western support had improved counteroffensive strategies, resulting in retaking Crimea and Donbas territories from Russia.

Petraeus has been a strong proponent of continued aid to Ukraine and increased NATO readiness for potential escalations by Russia and its allies. He spoke of the need for the United States to prioritize military readiness to counter China and to increase aid for Ukraine in the annual defense policy bill. He also discussed the importance of deploying Patriot missile systems in Ukraine as an anti-ballistic missile system and discussed measures that the US and NATO would employ if Russia were to carry out a nuclear attack in Ukraine. In an Atlantic Council discussion concerning additional aid to Ukraine he emphasized the need for the deployment of Western aircraft and support staff, a stronger defense guarantee, and diplomatic and economic pressures on Russia to hasten peace talks.

Petraeus expressed the belief that President Putin would eventually realize that the war is not sustainable on the battlefield and would agree to a negotiated resolution with Ukraine. In an article published by Foreign Policy magazine, Petraeus joined other experts to derive lessons from the Russian-Ukraine war that would prevent, deter, and combat forthcoming world conflicts.

During a trip to Kyiv, Petraeus joined a group from the Atlantic Council in presenting the council's Global Citizen Award to Ukrainian President Volodymyr Zelenskyy, recognizing his exceptional leadership in defending Ukraine against Russian aggression. While in Kyiv, Petraeus visited the American University of Kyiv, discussing his confidence in well-equipped Ukrainian troops and the challenges faced by Russian forces. He emphasized the effectiveness of Ukraine's newly formed brigades equipped with Western tanks and fighting vehicles, offering valuable insights and support to Ukraine's efforts in countering the Russian forces.

In an interview with CNN, Petraeus shared his view that alleged Ukrainian drone attacks on Russian soil were a way to not only attack valid military targets but also to acquaint the Russian people with the fact that a war was happening. He also described a shift in the Ukrainian strategy in their summer offensive as "starve, stretch and strike," a tactic used to create greater opportunity for success later in the conflict.

Speaking with CNN's Christiane Amanpour in response to the slow pace of Ukraine's counteroffensive in the summer of 2023, Petraeus noted that while the Russian military hadn't distinguished itself in many ways, the depth of their defenses in territory seized in Ukraine had proven formidable. In the same interview, he stated his opinion that Ukraine's forces had adapted well to Russian entrenchment, taking their time to pick through mine fields without the aid of air support. Petraeus once again argued for more military aid for Ukraine, and increased sanctions against Russia, in an effort to force a diplomatic resolution to the conflict. In another conversation with Amanpour, he warned that if Putin succeeds in achieving his substantial objectives in Ukraine, then Moldova or one of the Baltic states could be invaded next. Petraeus expressed his strong agreement with Henry Kissinger's statement that "NATO's defense now begins at the border between Ukraine and Russia."

=== Views on Israel's 2023–present Invasion of Gaza ===
In June 2024, Petraeus co-wrote an opinion article with Meghan O'Sullivan and Richard Fontaine, comparing Israel's invasion of Gaza to American-led regime change in Iraq. Petraeus describes the Israeli campaign as an "understandable response" to the 7 Oct. Hamas-led attack on Israel, in contrast to the typical scholarly view and pro-Palestine criticism calling it a genocide; he then proceeds to advise Israel in overcoming what he sees as America's past mistakes. Petraeus was accused by other commentators of "sanitizing history" on Iraq and puffing up his own legacy by writing this article.

General Petraeus reviewed a book on the war in Gaza written from the Israeli military's perspective, which was published in July 2024. Petraeus praised what he considered "a gripping, exhaustively researched account of the brutal October 7th attack" presented in the book.

== Personal life ==
According to Petraeus, he does not vote in elections, having stopped following his promotion to Major General in 2002 as part of a desire to be seen as apolitical. He stated that he did not vote in the 2016 election.

== Awards and honors ==
=== Decorations and badges ===
Petraeus's decorations and badges include the following:

U.S. military decorations
	Defense Distinguished Service Medal (with 3 oak leaf clusters)
	Distinguished Service Medal (with 2 oak leaf clusters)
	Defense Superior Service Medal (with oak leaf cluster)
	Legion of Merit (with 3 oak leaf clusters)
	Bronze Star (with V Device)
	Defense Meritorious Service Medal
	Meritorious Service Medal (with 2 oak leaf clusters)
	Joint Service Commendation Medal
	Army Commendation Medal (with 2 oak leaf clusters)
	Joint Service Achievement Medal
	Army Achievement Medal
U.S. unit awards
	Joint Meritorious Unit Award (with 3 oak leaf clusters)
	Army Meritorious Unit Commendation
	Army Superior Unit Award
U.S. non-military decorations
	State Department Secretary's Distinguished Service Award
	State Department Distinguished Honor Award
	State Department Superior Honor Award
U.S. service (campaign) medals and service and training ribbons
	National Defense Service Medal (with 2 Service Stars)
	Armed Forces Expeditionary Medal (with 2 Service Stars)
	Afghanistan Campaign Medal (with 3 Service Stars)
	Iraq Campaign Medal (with 4 Service Stars)
	Global War on Terrorism Expeditionary Medal
	Global War on Terrorism Service Medal
	Armed Forces Service Medal
	Humanitarian Service Medal
	Army Service Ribbon
	Army Overseas Service Ribbon (with award numeral 8)
International decorations
	United Nations Mission in Haiti (UNMIH) Medal
	NATO Meritorious Service Medal Iraq & Afghanistan with bronze service star
	NATO Medal for Yugoslavia, NTM-I, Afghanistan with 2 bronze service stars
Foreign state decorations
	Honorary Officer of the Order of Australia, Military Division
Meritorious Service Cross (Canada)	Meritorious Service Cross, Military Division (Canada)
	State Defence Cross of the Minister of Defence of the Czech Republic
	Commander of the Legion of Honour (France)
Ribbon of the French commemorative Medal	French Military Campaign Medal
	Knight Commander's Cross of the Order of Merit of the Federal Republic of Germany
	Gold Award of the Iraqi Order of the Date Palm
	Gold Cross of Merit of the Carabinieri (Italy)
	Order of National Security Merit, Tong-il Medal (Korea)
	Knight Grand Cross with Swords of the Order of Orange-Nassau (Netherlands)
	Commander's Cross of the Order of Merit of the Republic of Poland
Polish Army Medal (Gold)	Polish Army Medal, Gold
Polish Iraq Star	Polish Iraq Star
Romanian Emblem of Honor	Romanian Chief of Defense Honor Emblem
	Military Merit Order, First Class (United Arab Emirates)
	Vakhtang Gorgasali Order, 1st Rank (Government of Georgia)
	Decoration Commemorating 200 years of US-Colombia Relations, Grand Cross (Republic of Colombia)

U.S. badges, patches and tabs
Expert Infantryman Badge
Combat Action Badge
Master Combat Action Badge
Master Parachutist Badge
Air Assault Badge
Mountaineering Badge
Army Staff Identification Badge
Office of the Joint Chiefs of Staff Identification Badge
Ranger tab
101st Airborne Division Shoulder Sleeve Insignia worn as his Combat Service Identification Badge
101st Airborne Division Distinctive Unit Insignia
11 Overseas Service Bars
Foreign badges
British Army Parachutist Badge
Basic French Parachutist Badge (French: Brevet de Parachutisme militaire)
German Parachutist Badge in bronze (German: Fallschirmspringerabzeichen)
German Armed Forces Badge for Military Proficiency Bronze

=== Honorary degrees ===
- Eckerd College, 23 May 2010, honorary doctorate in laws
- University of Pennsylvania, 14 May 2012, honorary doctorate of laws
- Dickinson College, 20 May 2012, honorary doctorate of public service
- American University of Afghanistan, 17 June 2019, honorary doctorate of humane letters
- American University of Iraq, Sulaimani 18 June 2025, doctorate of civil law, honoris causa

=== Civilian awards and honors ===
Petraeus's civilian awards and honors include:

==== 2007–2010 ====
- 2007: 100 Most Influential Leaders and Revolutionaries of the Year, Time magazine
- 2007: Second Most Influential American Conservative, The Daily Telegraph
- 2007: Person of the Year 2007 runner-up, Time magazine
- 2007: Man of the Year, The Daily Telegraph
- 2008: Leader of the Year, GQ
- 2008: One of World's Top 100 Public Intellectuals, Foreign Policy and Prospect magazines
- 2008: 16th Most Powerful Person in the World, Newsweek
- 2009: George F. Kennan Award, National Committee on American Foreign Policy
- 2009: Distinguished Service Medal, The American Legion
- 2009: Military Leadership Award, The Atlantic Council
- 2009: Abraham Lincoln Award, Union League of Philadelphia
- 2009: Father of the Year Award, National Father's Day Committee
- 2009: Eisenhower Award, National Defense Industrial Association
- 2009: William Donovan Award, Office of Strategic Services
- 2009: Freedom Award, No Greater Sacrifice
- 2009: Distinguished Citizen Award, Congressional Medal of Honor Society
- 2009: Sam Gibbons Lifetime Achievement Award, The World Trade Center Tampa Bay
- 2010: James Madison Medal, The Woodrow Wilson School
- 2010: Leader of Principle Award, The Citadel at Baker School of Business
- 2010: Irving Kristol Award, American Enterprise Institute
- 2010: Intrepid Freedom Award, Intrepid Sea, Air & Space Museum
- 2010: Named No. 12 of 50 People Who Mattered in 2010, New Statesman
- 2010: Top 100 Global Thinkers, Foreign Policy
- 2010: Dwight D. Eisenhower Award, Veterans of Foreign Wars
- 2010: Dedicated Room, Thayer Hotel

==== 2011–2020 ====
- 2011: 100 Most Influential People in the World, Time magazine
- 2012: Golden Plate Award, American Academy of Achievement
- 2012: Golden Eagle Award, Society of American Military Engineers
- 2013: 35th Chesney Gold Medal, Royal United Services Institute
- 2013: History Makers Award, New-York Historical Society
- 2013: Gold Medal for Distinguished Achievement, The Holland Society of New York
- 2015: Luminary Award, WashingtonExec Leadership Council
- 2016: C3 Global Solutions Award, C3 US-Arab Business and Healthcare
- 2016: American Spirit Award, The Common Good
- 2017: Winston S Churchill National Leadership Award, The International Churchill Society
- 2018: Soldier Citizen Award, American College of Financial Services
- 2019: Recanati-Kaplan Award for Civic Excellence and Cultural Engagement, 92nd Street Y
- 2020: Currahee Crest Award, 506th Infantry Regiment

==== 2021–present ====
- 2021: Leadership Award, Voices Center for Resilience
- 2021: Top Voices in the Military Community, LinkedIn
- 2022: Decoration Commemorating 200 Years of Diplomatic Relations Between the Republic of Colombia and USA Grade of Grand Cross, The Embassy of Colombia-US
- 2022: American History Award, The Union League Club of New York
- 2022: Sanctioned by Russia for support of Ukraine, Ministry of Foreign Affairs of the Russian Federation
- 2022: Veteran Leadership Award, Iraq and Afghanistan Veterans of America
- 2023: Kissinger Senior Fellow, Yale Jackson School of Global Affairs
- 2023: The 21 Greatest Generals in American History
- 2023: C3 Global Valor Award
- 2023: Dickinson College President's Award
- 2023: U.S.-Arab Bridge Building Award
- 2024: Ticonderoga Award for a Continental Vision
- 2024: HBS Club of D.C. Lifetime Achievement Award
- 2024: Rescuer of Humanity Award
- 2025: The Army Heritage Center Foundation Living Legend Award

=== Additional recognition ===
In 2005, Petraeus was identified as one of America's top leaders by U.S. News & World Report.

In 2007, Time named Petraeus one of the 100 most influential leaders and revolutionaries of the year as well as one of its four runners up for Time Person of the Year. He was also named the second most influential American conservative by The Daily Telegraph as well as The Daily Telegraph's 2007 Man of the Year. His Ph.D. dissertation, The American Military and the Lessons of Vietnam: A Study of Military Influence and the Use of Force in the Post-Vietnam Era, published by Princeton University in 1987, was number two on the list of best-selling dissertations in 2007.

In 2008, a poll conducted by Foreign Policy and Prospect magazines selected Petraeus as one of the world's top 100 public intellectuals. Also in 2008, the Static Line Association named Petraeus as its 2008 Airborne Man of the Year, and Der Spiegel named him "America's most respected soldier". As 2008 came to a close, Newsweek named him the 16th most powerful person in the world in its 20 December 2008 edition, and Prospect magazine named him the "Public Intellectual of the Year". He was also named as one of the "75 Best People in the World" in the October 2009 issue of Esquire.

On 7 March 2009, Petraeus received the Distinguished Citizen Award from the Congressional Medal of Honor Society at the Ronald Reagan Presidential Library.

Gen. David H. Petraeus, the top U.S. commander in the war against terrorism in the Middle East and Central Asia, was the spring commencement convocation speaker at Texas A&M University on 13 May, a relatively new practice at Texas A & M.

On 9 December 2010, Barbara Walters picked Petraeus for the Most Fascinating Person of 2010. Walters called the top commander in Afghanistan "an American hero". Petraeus was chosen as "one of Time magazine's 50 "People Who Mattered" in December 2010. The same year he was named number 12 of 50 people who mattered in 2010 by the New Statesmen magazine, and Petraeus was listed as number 8 of 100 Foreign Policy Top 100 Global Thinkers for 2011.

The New Statesman annual survey presents the most influential people from pop stars and dissident activists to tech gurus and heads of state, the people doing most to shape our world keep changing. On 26 September 2011, Petraeus was listed as number 2 of the 50 for 2011. The Association of Special Operations Professionals named Petraeus as its 2011 Man of the Year for 2011, and was presented the award at Ft. Bragg on 2 November 2011, at its annual Special Operations Exposition.

In January 2012, Petraeus was named one of "The 50 Most Powerful People in Washington" by GQ magazine. Petraeus was inducted 29 January 2012, into the Reserve Officers Association's (ROA) Minuteman Hall of Fame as the 2011 Inductee during the 2012 ROA National Security Symposium. The German Order of Merit was presented to Petraeus on 14 February, by the German Secretary of Defense Thomas de Maizière. According to de Maizière, he is an "outstanding strategist and a true friend of the German people".

On 16 March 2012, the Dutch minister of defense Hans Hillen knighted Petraeus at the Hague with the Knight Grand Cross of the Order of Orange-Nassau with swords. The Minister thanked Petraeus in his speech for his, "unconditional support to the Dutch troops and for being a driving force behind a successful mission. Through his personal efforts for cooperation between the Netherlands and America, the Netherlands could achieve significant operational successes with the Task Force Uruzgan."

In 2012, Petraeus received the Golden Plate Award of the American Academy of Achievement. The following year, in 2013, the New-York Historical Society established the Petraeus-Hertog Lecture Leadership Library series. Petraeus was featured alongside 18 other graduates of the United States Military Academy in West Point Leadership: Profiles of Courage, a collection of leadership biographies published in 2013.

Captured correspondence from Osama bin Laden "Letters from Abbottabad" revealed that in May 2010, Bin Laden wanted to target President Barack Obama and General Petraeus. Bin Laden wrote: "The reason for concentrating on them is that Obama is the head of infidelity and killing him automatically will make Biden take over the presidency for the remainder of the term, as it is the norm over there. Biden is totally unprepared for that post, which will lead the U.S. into a crisis." It further went on to say, "As for Petraeus, he is the man of the hour in this last year of the war, and killing him would alter the war's path."

Petraeus and Dr. Henry Kissinger were the inaugural recipients of the Recanati-Kaplan Award for Civic Excellence and Cultural Engagement, presented by the 92nd Street Y on 19 May 2019. 92Y later established an Online Master Class in Leadership featuring a library series of lectures by Petraeus.

On 19 November 2020, General Petraeus became the first American military professional to deliver the annual Lee Knowles Lecture at Cambridge University's Trinity College.

On 7 December 2020, the Institute for the Study of War launched "The General David H. Petraeus Center for Emerging Leaders" to offer new educational and professional development programs to its students. Petraeus has been on the board of ISW since November 2013.

In August 2026, Petraeus was named to Forbes's inaugural list of America's 250 most successful living veterans.

== Works ==
=== Speeches, public remarks, interviews, and op-eds ===
- National Committee on American Foreign Policy George F. Kennan Award Acceptance Remarks. American Foreign Policy Interests, 31(4) July/August 2009.
- "The Foreign Policy Interview with Gen. David H. Petraeus", Foreign Policy January/February 2009.
- Petraeus, David H. (31 May 2009). "2009 Baccalaureate Remarks". Princeton University.
- "The Surge: The Whole Story 2009.
- "Remarks by General David H. Petraeus (Days of Remembrance 2010)". United States Holocaust Memorial Museum. 26 March 2013. Archived from the original on 21 December 2021.
- "Institutionalizing Change: Transformation in the US Army, 2005–2007", at the May 2010 American Enterprise Institute annual dinner.
- Petraeus, David H.; Goodfriend, Sydney E. (26 March 2013). "Training Veterans for Their Next Mission". The Wall Street Journal.
- Petraeus, David H.; O'Hanlon, Michael (7 April 2013). "An American future filled with promise". The Washington Post.
- Petraeus, David H.; O'Hanlon, Michael (30 April 2013). "Fund – don't cut U.S. soft power". Politico. Arlington, Va.
- Bremmer, Ian; Petraeus, David (22 July 2013). "Abe's electoral win is great news for Japan". Financial Times.
- Petraeus, David; O'Hanlon, Michael (4 August 2013). "Petraeus and O'Hanlon: Compromise on budget". USA Today.
- Petraeus, David H. (14 August 2013). "Reflections on the Counter-Insurgency Era". RUSI Journal. Vol. 158, no. 4. pp. 82–87. doi:10.1080/03071847.2013.826514.
- "Small Wars Journal Interview with General David H. Petraeus", Small Wars Journal (September 2013)
- Petraeus, David; O'Hanlon, Michael (24 September 2013). "The success story next door". Politico.
- Petraeus, David H. (29 October 2013). "How we won in Iraq: And why all the hard-won gains of the surge are in grave danger of being lost today". Foreign Policy. Archived from the original on 1 July 2014.
- Petraeus, David H.; Zoellick, Robert (18 February 2014). "Perfect Partners". Foreign Affairs.
- Petraeus, David H.; Bremmer, Ian (20 February 2014). "The changing geopolitics of energy". Financial Times.
- Petraeus, David H.; O'Hanlon, Michael (8 April 2014). "Democracy Dividends from the Afghanistan Investment". The Wall Street Journal. Archived from the original on 15 March 2016.
- Petraeus, David H.; Serchuk, Vance (9 April 2014). "U.S. needs to plan for the day after an Iran deal". The Washington Post.
- O'Hanlon, Michael; Petraeus, David H. (27 April 2014). "The Great American Comeback". Politico.
- "Fletcher Security Review Sits Down with Former ISAF Commander and CIA Director", May 2014.
- Petraeus, David H. (3 July 2014). "Point of View: Success of TPP negotiations is a national security necessity". The Asahi Shimbun. Archived from the original on 26 July 2014.
- Petraeus, David H.; Brown, Neil R. (11 July 2014). "Mexico's miracle: Political productivity". Houston Chronicle.
- Petraeus, David H.; O'Hanlon, Michael (5 September 2014). "Petraeus and O'Hanlon: Export-Import Bank an easy call". USA Today.
- "Report Launch of the CFR-Sponsored Independent Task Force on North America", 2 October 2014
- "Petraeus and Zoellick urge U.S. to pay attention to North America", 22 October 2014
- Petraeus, David H.; O'Hanlon, Michael (30 January 2015). "America on the way up". The Washington Post.
- "Petraeus: The Islamic State isn't our biggest problem in Iraq", The Washington Post (20 March 2015)
- Serchuk, Vance; Petraeus, David H.; Okun, Steven (21 April 2015). "The Case for the Trans-Pacific Partnership". Institutional Investor. Archived from the original on 25 April 2015.
- "Q & A David Petraeus GS '85 GS '87", The Daily Princetonian (June 2015)
- Allison, Graham; et al. (24 June 2015). "Public Statement on U.S. Policy Toward the Iran Nuclear Negotiations". Washington Institute.
- Petraeus, David H.; Bhayani, Paras (25 June 2015). "An agenda of prosperity for America". CNN.
- Petraeus, David H.; Bhayani, Paras D. (25 June 2015). "North America: the Next Great Emerging Market?". Foreign Policy.
- Petraeus, David H.; Bhayani, Paras D. (25 June 2015). "The Next Great Emerging Market?". Belfer Center. Archived from the original on 26 June 2015.
- Petraeus, David H.; O'Hanlon, Michael (7 July 2015). "The U.S. needs to keep troops in Afghanistan". The Washington Post.
- "Petraeus explains how jihadists could be peeled away to fight ISIS – and Assad" Jake Tapper of CNN; 1 September 2015
- "A Grand Strategy for 'Greater' Asia", the Lowy Lecture (September 2015)
- Petraeus, David H. (26 March 2016). "Brexit would weaken the West's war on terror". The Telegraph. Archived from the original on 12 January 2022.
- Petraeus, David H. (13 May 2016). "David Petraeus: Anti-Muslim bigotry aids Islamist terrorists". The Washington Post.
- Petraeus, David (25 May 2016). "Native son John Galvin laid to rest". Boston Web Group.
- Patel, Deep K. (2016). A Paperboy's Fable: The 11 Principles of Success. New York: Post Hill Press. p. 13. ISBN 978-1-68261-004-6.
- Petraeus, David (9 June 2016). "Breaking Bread: David H. Petraeus and Ulysses S. Grant". The New York Times.
- Petraeus, David H.; O'Hanlon, Michael (9 August 2016). "The Myth of a U.S. Military 'Readiness' Crisis". The Wall Street Journal.
- Petraeus, David H. (12 August 2016). "The challenge in Mosul won't be to defeat the Islamic State. It will be what comes after". The Washington Post.
- O'Hanlon, Michael E.; Petraeus, David H. (16 August 2016). "America's awesome military". Brookings Institution.
- O'Hanlon, Michael E.; Petraeus, David H. (September 2016). "America's awesome military". Foreign Affairs.
- Petraeus, David H. (14 October 2016). "Gen. David Petraeus: Why I salute John McCain, a steadfast supporter of our military". Fox News.
- Petraeus, David (19 October 2016). "David Petraeus On The Complexities Of Re-Taking And Stabilizing Mosul". NPR.
- Petraeus, David (20 October 2016). "Petraeus says there's a bigger challenge to come once Iraq retakes Mosul from ISIS". PBS.
- Petraeus, David H. (1 February 2017). "The State of the World" (PDF). House Armed Services Committee.
- Petraeus, David H. (29 March 2017). "As Machines Wage War, Human Nature Endures". Berggruen Institute. Archived from the original on 9 April 2017.
- Petraeus, David H. (29 June 2017). "Around the World in 60 Minutes". Aspen Ideas.
- Babich, Jennifer. (2 October 2018). "Gen. David Petraeus recalls being shot while commanding at Fort Campbell". Leaf Chronicle.
- Reiss, Robert. (October 2018). "The Leadership Issue" (PDF). The CEO Forum.
- Petraeus, David; Whitehouse, Sheldon (8 March 2019). "Putin and other authoritarians' corruption is a weapon – and a weakness". The Washington Post.
- "David Petraeus Offers Big Ideas for Leadership, Foreign Policy". Intelligence Matters. CBS News Radio. 19 March 2019. Archived from the original on 26 March 2019.
- Guy Raz (21 May 2019). "General David Petraeus". Wisdom From the Top (Podcast). Built-It Productions.
- "General David Petraeus: The Perils of Victory". What It Takes (Podcast). Academy of Achievement. 3 June 2019.
- Petraeus, David; Serchuk, Vance (1 April 2020). "Can America Trust the Taliban to Prevent Another 9/11?". Foreign Affairs.
- Rubenstein, David (1 September 2020). "How to Lead: Wisdom from the World's Greatest CEOs, Founders, and Game Changers". Simon and Schuster. pp. 223–41.
- Petraeus, David (25 September 2020). "General David Petraeus – Why fortune favours the prepared mind: how to surge your ideas". ChangeMakers.
- Petraeus, David; Shulkin, David; Butler, Jeremy (30 May 2021). "A Memorial Day appeal to Congress: Help service members with toxic burn pit exposure". NBC News.
- Petraeus, David (24 July 2021). "Gen. David Petraeus says the 'Taliban has the momentum' in Afghanistan". Fox News.
- Petraeus, David (2 September 2021). "Gen. David Petraeus: Not Inconceivable For US to Recognize Taliban Government". Amanpour and Company. Archived from the original on 21 December 2021.
- Lewis, Duncan; Petraeus, David (10 September 2021). Twenty years since 9/11 with Major General Duncan Lewis and General David Petraeus. United States Studies Centre.
- Petraeus, David (23 December 2021). Leadership Forged in Fire – General Petraeus. GovCon.
- Stillwell, Blake (31 January 2021). "General Petraeus returned to duty days after being shot in the chest with an M-16". We Are The Mighty.
- Petraeus, David; Chernow, Ronald; White, Ronald (27 April 2022). The Presidency Ulysses Grant Bicentennial Dinner. C-Span.
- "Ex-CIA chief predicts Chinese President's next moves after Pelosi's Taiwan trip". CNN. 3 August 2022.
- Petraeus, David (8 August 2022). "Afghanistan Did Not Have to Turn Out This Way". The Atlantic.
- "Putin's annexation announcement significant, but it's also desperate': Petraeus". ABC News. 2 October 2022.
- Turak, Natasha (4 October 2022). "Ex-CIA chief's greatest concern in the Russia-Ukraine conflict is escalation 'spiraling out of control'". CNBC News.
- Muratore, Andrea (3 February 2023). "Putin Has Made NATO Great Again: A Dialogue With David Petraeus". Inside Over.
- "Former Intelligence Officials Testify on National Security". C-Span. 8 February 2023.
- Lippman, Daniel (24 March 2023). "Petraeus on the legacy of the Iraq invasion". Politico.
- "America and the Taliban: Part One". YouTube. FrontLine PBS. 4 April 2023.
- "Twenty Years After Saddam: The Future of the U.S.–Iraq Relationship A Conversation with David Petraeus". The Washington Institute for Near East Policy.
- Tavberidze, Vazha (18 April 2023). "Ukraine War A Clear-Cut Case Of 'Right Versus Wrong', Says Petraeus". Radio Free Europe/Radio Liberty.
- Bergen, Peter. Episode 2: What Keeps General David Petraeus Up at Night?. In The Room with Peter Bergen – via Audible.
- "Retired Army General weighs in after anti-Putin Russians claim Belgorod attack". CNN – via YouTube.
- Petraeus, David; Flanagan, Isaac (12 March 2026). "The Autonomous Battlefield". Foreign Affairs.
- Petraeus, David (15 April 2026). "America's Success Against Iran May Prove a Distraction". The Wall Street Journal.
- Petraeus, David; Flanagan, Isaac (21 April 2026). "The Pentagon could be about to make a $55 billion mistake". The Hill.
- Petraeus, David (1 July 2026). "What a wave of prominent arrests means for Iraq". The Washington Post.
- Petraeus, David (3 July 2026). "Let us all become civil and united". The New York Daily News. Archived from the original on 4 July 2026.
- Petraeus, David; Kaluderovic, Clara (7 July 2026). "Ukraine Is Redefining Modern Warfare". The Wall Street Journal.
- Petraeus, David; Kaluderovic, Clara (8 July 2026). "The Ukraine Lesson Taiwan Keeps Missing". Foreign Affairs.
- Petraeus, David. "Iraqi Prime Minister's Washington Trip Comes Pivotal Moment". The Washington Post.
- Petraeus, David (10 September 2026). "George W. Bush, Political Courage, and the Surge in Iraq". The Free Press.
- Petraeus, David (15 September 2026). "The Race to Make Putin's Aggression Unaffordable". The Washington Post.

=== Academic and other works ===
- Lorenz, G. C.; Willbanks, James H.; Petraeus, David H.; Stuart, Paul A.; Crittenden, Burr L.; George, Dewey P. (1983). Operation Junction City, Vietnam 1967: battle book (Report). Ft. Leavenworth, KS: Combat Studies Institute. OCLC 15637627 – via Defense Technical Information Center.
- Petraeus, David H. (1983). "What is Wrong with a Nuclear Freeze", Military Review v.63:49–64, November 1983.
- Petraeus, David H. (1984). "Light Infantry in Europe: Strategic Flexibility and Conventional Deterrence", Military Review v.64:33–55, December 1984.
- Petraeus, David H. (January 1985). "Review of Richard A. Gabriel's The Antagonists: A Comparative Combat Assessment of the Soviet and American Soldier". Military Affairs. 49 (1). Lexington, Va.: Society for Military History: 17–22. doi:10.2307/1988272. JSTOR 1988272. OCLC 37032240.
- Petraeus, David H. (1986), "Lessons of history and lessons of Vietnam", Parameters (Carlisle, PA: U.S. Army War College) 16(3): 43–53, Autumn 1986.
- Petraeus on Vietnam's Legacy, Rachel Dry, The Washington Post, 14 January 2007, excerpts from Petraeus's doctoral dissertation, "The American Military and the Lessons of Vietnam".
- Clark, Asa A., Kaufman, Daniel J., and Petraeus, David H. (1987). "Why an Army?" Army Magazine v38(2)26–34, February 1987.
- Petraeus, David H. (1987). "El Salvador and the Vietnam Analogy", Armed Force Journal International, February 1987.
- Taylor, William J. Jr.; Petraeus, David H. (1987). "The legacy of Vietnam for the U.S. military". In Osborn, George K. (ed.). Democracy, strategy, and Vietnam: implications for American policy making. Lexington, MA: Lexington Books. ISBN 978-0-669-16340-7. OCLC 15518468.
- Petraeus, David H. (December 1987). "Korea, the Never-Again Club, and Indochina". Parameters. Vol. 17, no. 4. Carlisle, PA: U.S. Army War College. pp. 59–70. ISSN 0031-1723. OCLC 1039883. SuDoc No. D 101.72:17/4, GPO Item No. 0325-K, PURL LPS1511.
- Golden, James R.; Kaufman, Daniel J.; Clark, Asa A.; Petraeus, David H. (Eds) (1989), NATO at Forty: Change Continuity, & Prospects. Westview Press
- Petraeus, David H. (Summer 1989). "Military Influence And the Post-Vietnam Use of Force". Armed Forces & Society. 15 (4): 489–505. doi:10.1177/0095327X8901500402. OCLC 49621350. S2CID 145680799.
- Petraeus, David H.; Brennan, Robert A. (January–February 1997). "Walk and Shoot Training". Infantry Magazine. Vol. 87, no. 1. pp. 36–40. Archived from the original on 4 March 2016.
- Petraeus, David H.; Carr, Damian P.; Abercrombie, John C. (May–June 1997). "Why We Need FISTs – Never Send a Man When You Can Send a Bullet" (PDF). Field Artillery. Vol. 1997, no. 3. Fort Sill, OK: U.S. Army Field Artillery School. pp. 3–5. ISSN 0899-2525. OCLC 16516511. HQDA PB6-97-3, USPS 309-010, PURL, SuDoc No. D 101.77/2: 1997/3. Archived (PDF) from the original on 27 September 2007.,
- "Lessons of the Iraq War and Its Aftermath". Washington Institute for Near East Policy. 2004.
- (2006) "Learning Counterinsurgency: Observations from Soldiering in Iraq", Military Review
- Petraeus, David H. (March 2006). "A Conversation with Lieutenant General David H. Petraeus" (PDF). Insights. Vol. 3, no. 1. Suffolk, Va.: Lockheed Martin. pp. 2–5, 28–29. Archived from the original (PDF) on 6 January 2009.
- (2007) The U.S. Army/Marine Corps Counterinsurgency Field Manual (Foreword) "FM-3-24"
- (2007) "Beyond the Cloister", The American Interest Magazine
- Petraeus, David H. (October 2007). "Iraq: Progress in the Face of Challenge" (PDF). Army Magazine. Vol. 57, no. 10. Arlington, Va.: Association of the United States Army. pp. 115–23. Archived from the original (PDF) on 26 October 2007.
- Petraeus, David H. (2010). "Counterinsurgency Concepts: What We Learned in Iraq". Global Policy. 1 (1): 116–17. doi:10.1111/j.1758-5899.2009.00003.x.
- Petraeus, David H. (2010) "Shoulder to shoulder in Afghanistan", Policy Options, April 2010.
- Petraeus, David H. (April 2011). "Ryan C. Crocker: Diplomat and Partner Extraordinaire" (PDF). Army Magazine. Vol. 61, no. 4. Arlington, Va.: Association of the United States Army. pp. 16, 18. Archived from the original (PDF) on 30 April 2011.
- Petraeus, David H. (Summer–Fall 2012). "CIA's Directorate of Science and Technology, In-Q-Tel, and the Private Sector". Intelligencer: Journal of U.S. Intelligence Studies. Falls Church, Va.: Association of Former Intelligence Officers. pp. 7–10.
- Petraeus, David; Crocker, Ryan. "The General and the Ambassador: General David Petraeus, Ambassador Ryan Crocker". SoundCloud. Academy of Diplomacy.
- Petraeus, David; Caruso, Philip (March 2019). "Coherence and Comprehensiveness: An American Foreign Policy Imperative". Belfer Center for Science and International Affairs.
- Petraeus, David; Serchuk, Vance (June 2019). "A Return to Pointe du Hoc: The Ideas that Defined President Reagan's Approach to the World and Why They Still Matter Today" (PDF). Ronald Reagan Presidential Foundation & Institute.
- Petraeus, David (September 2019). The Cyber Defense Review: A Conversation with General (Ret.) David H. Petraeus (PDF). The Army Cyber Institute. pp. 15–19.
- Petraeus, David (2020). "Tell Me How This Ends" ( (PDF)). Domestic & International (Dis)Order: A Strategic Response (PDF). Aspen Strategy Group. pp. 109–14. Archived from the original on 2 November 2020.
- Pires, Nuno L.; Petraeus, David (2021). Holistic Command of War: Wellington, Spínola and Petraeus. Independently published. ISBN 979-8-5817-7863-0.
- Petraeus, David; Woodson, Chuck (April 2021). "The CTX Interview General David Petraeus, US Army, retired". CTX. 2 (2): 36–47.
- McMillion, Joshua; Petraeus, David (29 May 2023). "E36 General David H. Petraeus". Tales of Leadership.

=== Conflict (2023) ===
Petraeus co-authored a book published in 2023 that is generally considered more notable than most of his other published works:

Petraeus, David; Roberts, Andrew (2023). Conflict: The Evolution of Warfare from 1945 to Ukraine. Harper. ISBN 978-0-06-329313-7.

Conflict was No. 13 on The New York Times best-seller list for the week of 5 November 2023, #12 on USA Today's best-seller list the week of 25 October 2023, and #10 on Publishers Weekly's best seller list on 3 November 2023. It was included in National Business Review's annual selection of summer reading on 24 December 2023. It was listed under "Best Reads Of 2023" by

  - The Cipher Brief | 17 December
  - Foreign Policy Research Institute | 26 December
  - Modern War Institute | 29 December

Petraeus appeared at the 2024 New Orleans Book Festival and spoke with the former New Orleans mayor Mitch Landrieu about Conflict and the evolution of warfare.

== See also ==
- Hood event
- Iraq War troop surge of 2007
- List of American federal politicians convicted of crimes
- MoveOn.org ad controversy

== Notes and references ==
Military offices
Preceded by Richard A. Cody	Commanding General of the 101st Airborne Division; 2002–2004	Succeeded by Thomas R. Turner II
New title	Commanding General of the Multi-National Security Transition Command – Iraq; 2004–2005	Succeeded by Martin Dempsey
Preceded by William Wallace	Commandant of the United States Army Command and General Staff College; 2005–2007	Succeeded by William Caldwell
Preceded by George Casey	Commanding General of the Multinational Force-Iraq; 2007–2008	Succeeded by Raymond Odierno
Preceded by Martin Dempsey; Acting	Commander of United States Central Command; 2008–2010	Succeeded by John Allen; Acting
Preceded by Stanley McChrystal	Commander of the International Security Assistance Force; 2010–2011	Succeeded by John Allen
Political offices
Preceded by Michael Morell; Acting	4th Director of the Central Intelligence Agency; 2011–2012	Succeeded by Michael Morell; Acting
