= Osama Youssef Kashmoula =

Iraqi politician (died 2004)

Osama Youssef Kashmoula (died 14 July 2004) was an Iraqi politician who served as governor of Nineveh until his assassination. As governor, he was known for "reaching across ethnic and sectarian divides in Mosul," with David Petraeus calling him a "courageous, committed and determined governor."

While traveling in a convoy, Kashmoula was attacked by unidentified assailants between the cities of Baiji and Tikrit, as he traveled south to Baghdad. He was killed with two guards. Insurgents had repeatedly attacked local officials, who were seen as being collaborators with American forces, but who had not killed an official as senior as Kashmoula since the assassinations of Iraq's most senior career diplomat and a top Education Ministry official.
