= Leftwich Trophy =

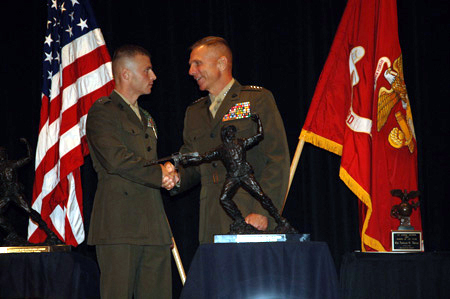
Gen Hagee presents the Leftwich Trophy to Capt Bronzi in 2005

The Leftwich Trophy, also known as the Leftwich Award, is a trophy given for outstanding leadership and is an award presented annually in memory of Lieutenant Colonel William Groom Leftwich, United States Marine Corps, who was killed in action during the Vietnam War in November 1970.

Eligible nominees are Marine Captains in the ground combat element serving on active duty as a company or battery commander with the ground forces of the Fleet Marine Force at the time of nomination. Posthumous awards can be made of this award providing nomination complies with all the criteria for receiving the award. Selection is done by a board of senior officers chaired by the Deputy Commandant of Plans, Policy and Operations (DC, PP&O), who then after reviewing the applicants, makes recommendation to the Commandant of the Marine Corps for his final approval.

The trophy is provided to the Marine Corps through an endowment by the H. Ross Perot Foundation; Leftwich and Perot were classmates at the United States Naval Academy. The trophy itself was designed by Felix de Weldon, designer of the Marine Corps War Memorial in Washington, D.C. The Leftwich Trophy, a replica of the statue commemorating the service and leadership of LtCol Leftwich, was first presented in June 1979 at the commissioning ceremony for the USS Leftwich (DD-984).

The Marine Corps bestowed the first posthumous Leftwich Trophy to Captain John W. Maloney, who was killed on 16 June 2005 when the unit he was leading was ambushed in a small town south of Ramadi, Iraq.

== Recipients ==
Year	Rank	Name	Unit
1979	Captain	Clyde S. Brinkley, Jr.	2d Battalion, 2d Marines
1980	Captain	Charles R. Sherrill	2d Tank Battalion
1981	Captain	John Caldwell	32d MAU
1982	Captain	Dirk R. Ahle	2nd Battalion, 1st Marines
1983	Captain	Ronald L. King	3d Battalion, 12th Marines
1984	Captain	Robert K. Dobson, Jr.	2d Battalion, 8th Marines, 22d MAU
1985	Captain	Dennis J. Hejlik	3d Battalion, 8th Marines
1986	Captain	David W. Mauldin	2d Battalion, 8th Marines
1987	Captain	Paul E. Lefebvre	2d Battalion, 9th Marines
1988	Captain	John R. Allen	3d Battalion, 4th Marines
1989	Captain	James B. Laster	1st Battalion, 25th Marines
1990	Captain	Ronald F. Baczkowski	3d Battalion, 1st Marines
1991	Captain	Dennis M. Greene	2d LAR Battalion
1992	Captain	Michael L. Ettore	1st Battalion, 8th Marines
1993	Captain	Robert F. Castellvi	BLT 2/9, 15th MEU
1994	Captain	Steven M. Zotti	BLT 1/6, 22d MEU
1995	Captain	Jeffery J. Sharrock	3d MarDiv
1996	Captain	Jeffery J. Kenney	2d Battalion, 2d Marines
1997	Captain	Julian D. Alford	3d Battalion, 8th Marines
1998	Captain	Jason Q. Bohm	2d Battalion, 1st Marines
1999	Captain	Daniel M. Sullivan	3d Battalion, 8th Marines
2000	Captain	Jason L. Morris	BLT 1/5, 31st MEU
2001	Captain	Michael D. Grice	2d Battalion, 11th Marines
2002	Captain	Farrell J. Sullivan	3d Battalion, 8th Marines
2003	Captain	Christeon C. Griffin	3d Battalion, 1st Marines
2004	Captain	Christopher J. Bronzi	2d Battalion, 4th Marines
2005	Captain	John W. Maloney	1st Battalion, 5th Marines
2006	Captain	Matthew W. Tracy	2d Battalion, 3d Marines
2007	Captain	Jonathan Smith	BLT 2/4, 31st MEU
2008	Captain	Jonathan Hamilton	1st Battalion, 9th Marines
2009	Captain	Christopher S. Conner	2d LAR Battalion
2010	Captain	Timothy Ryan Sparks	1st Battalion, 6th Marines
2011	Captain	Casey M. Brock	1st Battalion, 5th Marines
2012	Captain	Benjamin M. Middendorf	2d Battalion, 5th Marines
2013	Captain	Christopher A. Ashinhurst	1st Tank Battalion
2014	Captain	Daniel E. Grainger	1st Battalion, 6th Marines
2015	Captain	Thomas W. Morrow	2d Battalion, 3d Marines
2016	Captain	David J. Palka	Task Force Spartan
2017	Captain	Gregory M. Veteto	1st Battalion, 5th Marines
2018	Captain	Brian D. Coleman	Task Force Southwest
2019	Captain	Joseph F. Albano Jr.	1st Battalion, 6th Marines
2020	Captain	Michael H. Nolan	2nd Battalion, 5th Marines
2021	Captain	Jon D. Sanko	2nd Battalion, 1st Marines
2022	Captain	Shan G. Mandrayar	BLT 2/4, 13th MEU
2023	Major	Michael E. Larson	2nd Battalion, 7th Marines
2024	Captain	Stephen P. Knego	3d Marine Littoral Regiment
2025	Captain	Andrew R. Kennedy Jr.	2nd Battalion, 7th Marines
