= Samuel J. Locklear =

United States Navy admiral

Samuel J. Locklear III
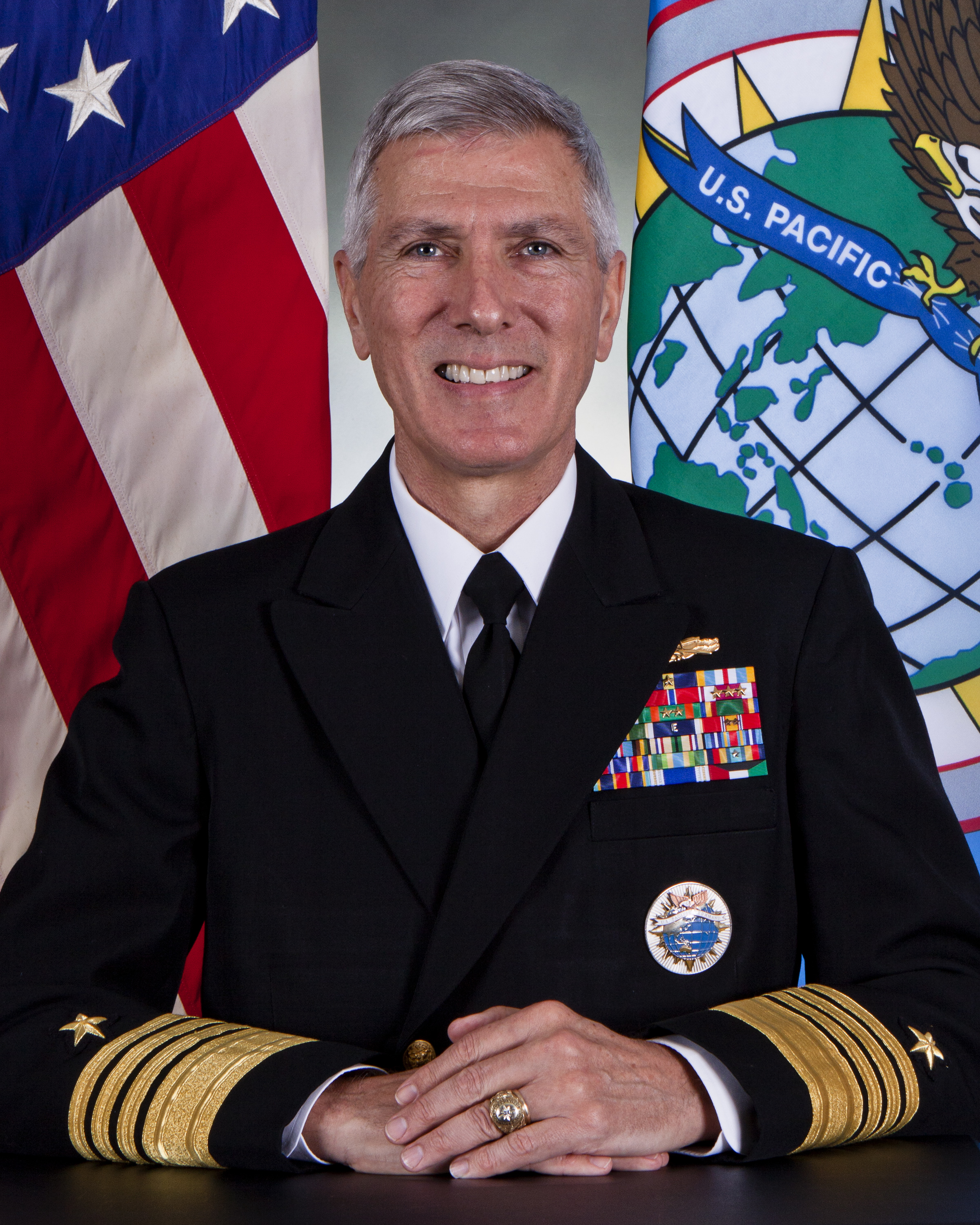
- Locklear in March 2012
- Born: October 28, 1954 (age 71); Macon, Georgia, U.S.
- Military career
- Allegiance: United States
- Branch: United States Navy
- Service years: 1972–2015
- Rank: Admiral
- Commands: United States Pacific Command; United States Naval Forces Europe; Allied Joint Force Command Naples; United States Third Fleet; Cruiser-Destroyer Group 5 and Nimitz Strike Group; Destroyer Squadron 2 USS Leftwich
- Conflicts: Gulf War; War in Afghanistan; Iraq War; Military intervention in Libya
- Awards: Defense Distinguished Service Medal (2); Navy Distinguished Service Medal (2); Defense Superior Service Medal; Legion of Merit (5); Bronze Star Medal; Honorary Officer of the Order of Australia (Australia)

Samuel Jones "Sam" Locklear III (born October 28, 1954) is a retired United States Navy admiral who last served as the commander of the United States Pacific Command from March 9, 2012, to May 27, 2015. Prior to that, he served as Commander, United States Naval Forces Europe – United States Naval Forces Africa and NATO's Commander, Allied Joint Force Command Naples. Prior to that, he served as Director, Navy Staff from July 2009 to October 2010. He retired from the navy on July 1, 2015, after 39 years of service.

== Early life and education ==
Locklear enlisted in the United States Navy in March 1972 at the age of 17. His basic training and active service was placed on hold when he was accepted into the United States Naval Academy after graduating from James F. Byrnes High School in 1972. Locklear graduated from the Naval Academy in 1977, where he earned a Bachelor of Science degree in operations analysis. He currently serves as a Senior Fellow at the Johns Hopkins Applied Physics Laboratory.

== Naval career ==
After receiving his commission as an ensign, Locklear served aboard USS William V. Pratt (DDG-44) as Main Propulsion Assistant and Missile Fire Control Officer. He was then selected for training and service in the Navy Nuclear Propulsion program, and served as Electrical Principal Assistant in USS Carl Vinson. Graduating with honors from the Surface Warfare Department Head School, he served as Operations Officer and Engineering Officer in USS Callaghan, and as Executive Officer in USS Truxtun. Subsequently, he commanded USS Leftwich and served as Commander, Destroyer Squadron 2 deploying with the USS Dwight D. Eisenhower Battle Group. In October 2002, he assumed command of Cruiser-Destroyer Group 5 and Nimitz Strike Group deploying to the Persian Gulf in 2003 in direct support of Operation Iraqi Freedom and Operation Enduring Freedom.

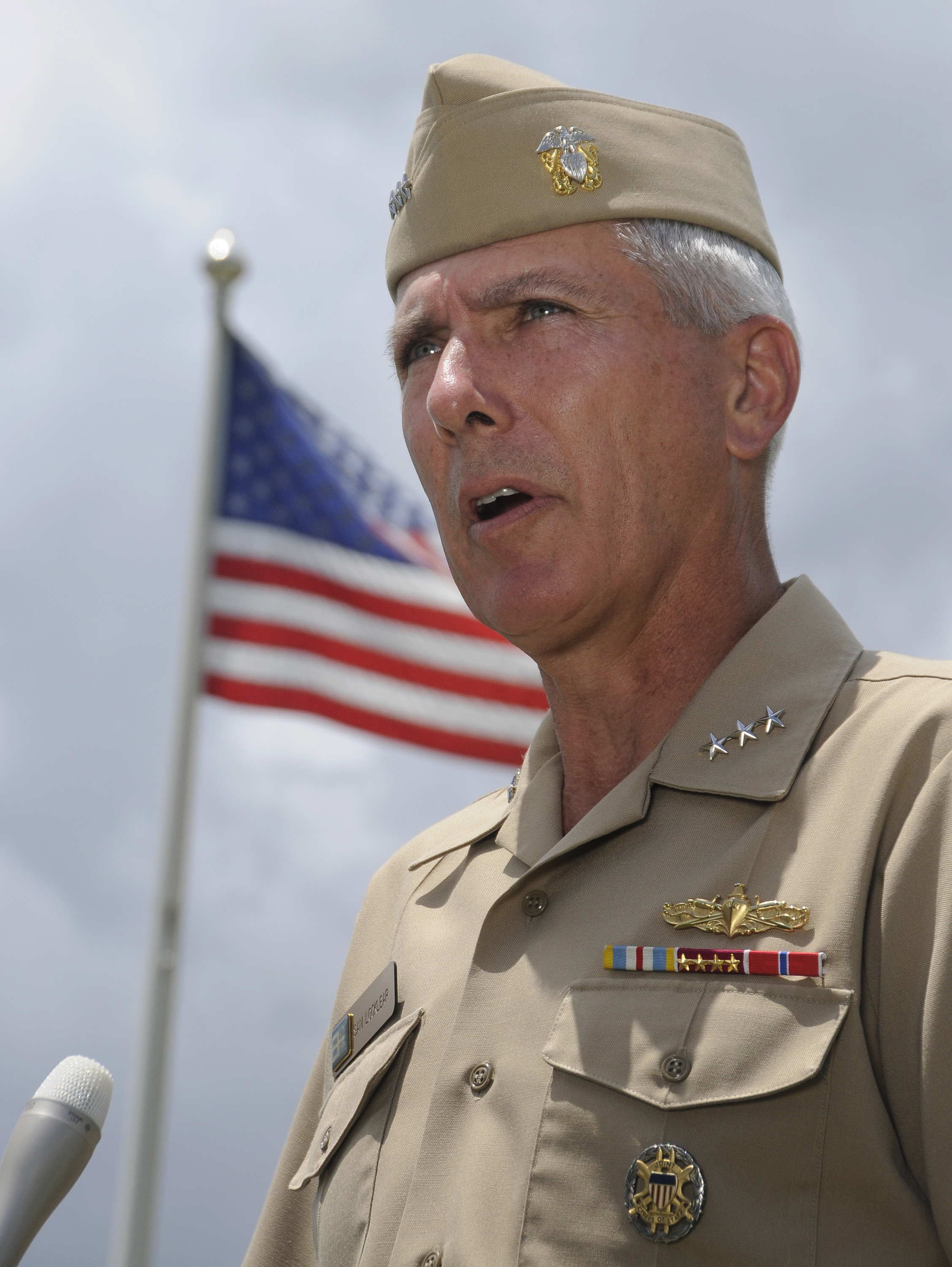
US Navy 080707-N-1722M-075 Vice Adm. Samuel J. Locklear, commander of the U.S. 3rd Fleet and Combined Task Force Commander for Rim of the Pacific (RIMPAC) 2008, conducts a press conference

Ashore, Locklear has served as a Company Officer in the Office of the Commandant, United States Naval Academy and later as the 78th Commandant of Midshipmen. In Washington, D.C., he served as Chief of the Regional Engagement and Presence Joint Warfare Capabilities Assessment Branch in the Strategic Plans and Policy Directorate of the Joint Chiefs of Staff, as Executive Assistant to the Vice Chief of Naval Operations, and as Deputy Director for Requirements in the Assessment Division (N81D). In February 2004, he returned to the OPNAV Staff as Deputy Director for Surface Warfare (N76B), and in October 2004, he became the Director of the Assessment Division (N81). In October 2005 he became the Director of the Programming Division (N80). From May 2007 to July 2009, he served as Commander, United States Third Fleet and, from July 2009, as Director, Navy Staff (N09B).

Locklear is a 1992 graduate of the National Defense University's Industrial College of the Armed Forces, holds a Master of Public Administration degree from the George Washington University, and attended the Senior Officials in National Security course at the Maxwell School of Syracuse University.

Locklear's personal decorations include the Navy Distinguished Service Medal with gold star, Defense Superior Service Medal, Legion of Merit with four gold stars, Bronze Star Medal, Navy Meritorious Service Medal with three gold stars, Navy Commendation Medal with gold star, Navy Achievement Medal with gold star, and numerous unit and campaign awards.

In March 2011, Locklear commanded United States Navy forces enforcing the Libyan no-fly zone, with overall command going to General Carter Ham.

Locklear has called climate change (global warming) the biggest worry for the United States. On April 9, 2013, Jim Inhofe, the ranking member of the Senate Committee on Armed Services, asked Locklear to clarify his position of climate change as the principal national security threat. Locklear cited USAID government statistics on recent Indo-Asian natural disasters and the long range planning challenges of our security partners and allies in the region.

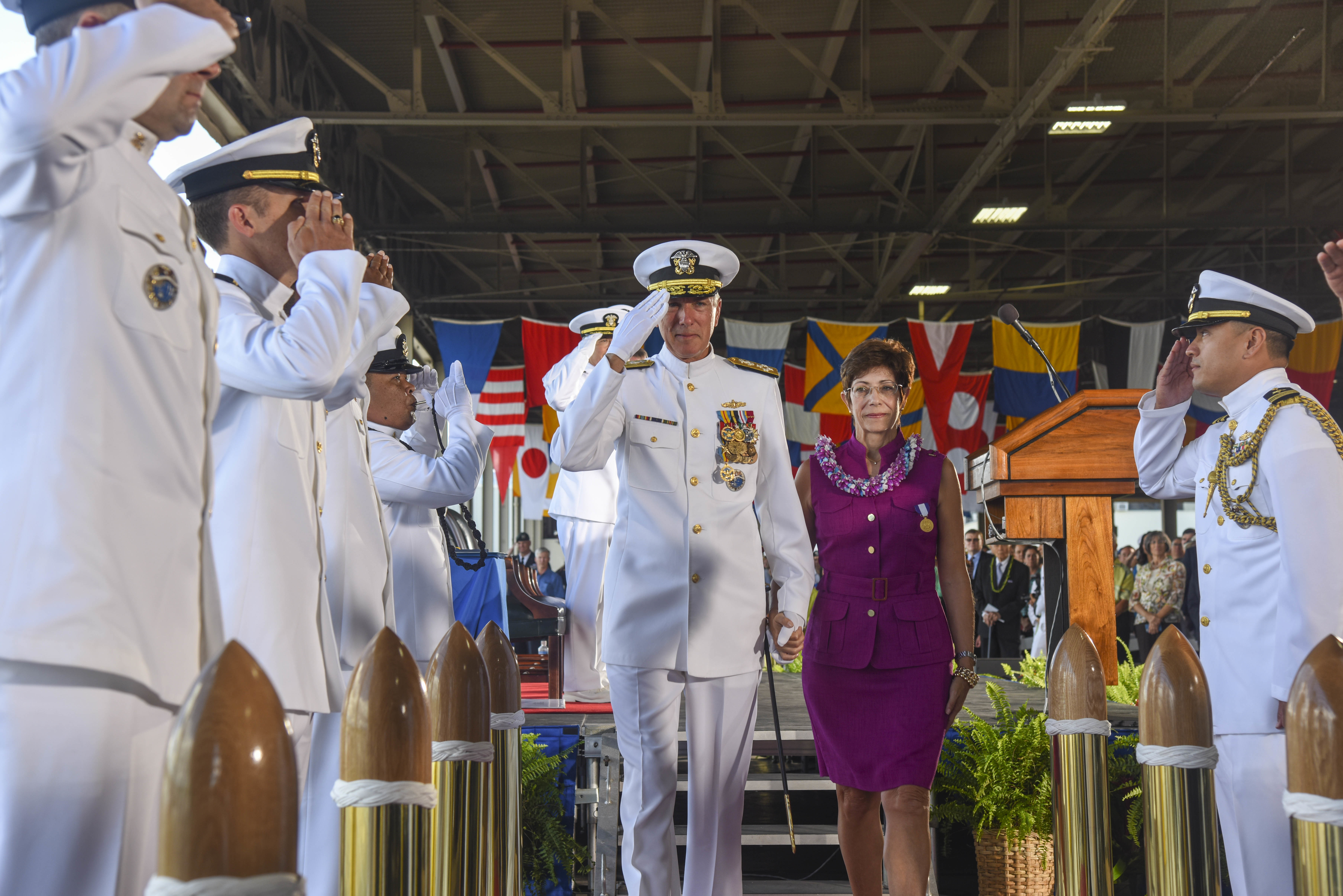
2015 PACOM and PACFLT Change of Command

In 2015, Leonard Glenn Francis, the contractor at the center of the "Fat Leonard" navy corruption scandal, told Navy investigators that he paid for "opulent dinners and other favors" for Locklear. Although the Navy cleared Locklear of wrongdoing, the episode prevented his appointment to Chairman of the Joint Chiefs of Staff, for which he had been shortlisted. Locklear retired from the navy in June 2015, a month after Joseph Dunford was appointed chairman instead.

== Personal ==
In the 2024 United States presidential election, Locklear endorsed Kamala Harris.

== Awards and decorations ==
Surface Warfare Officer badge
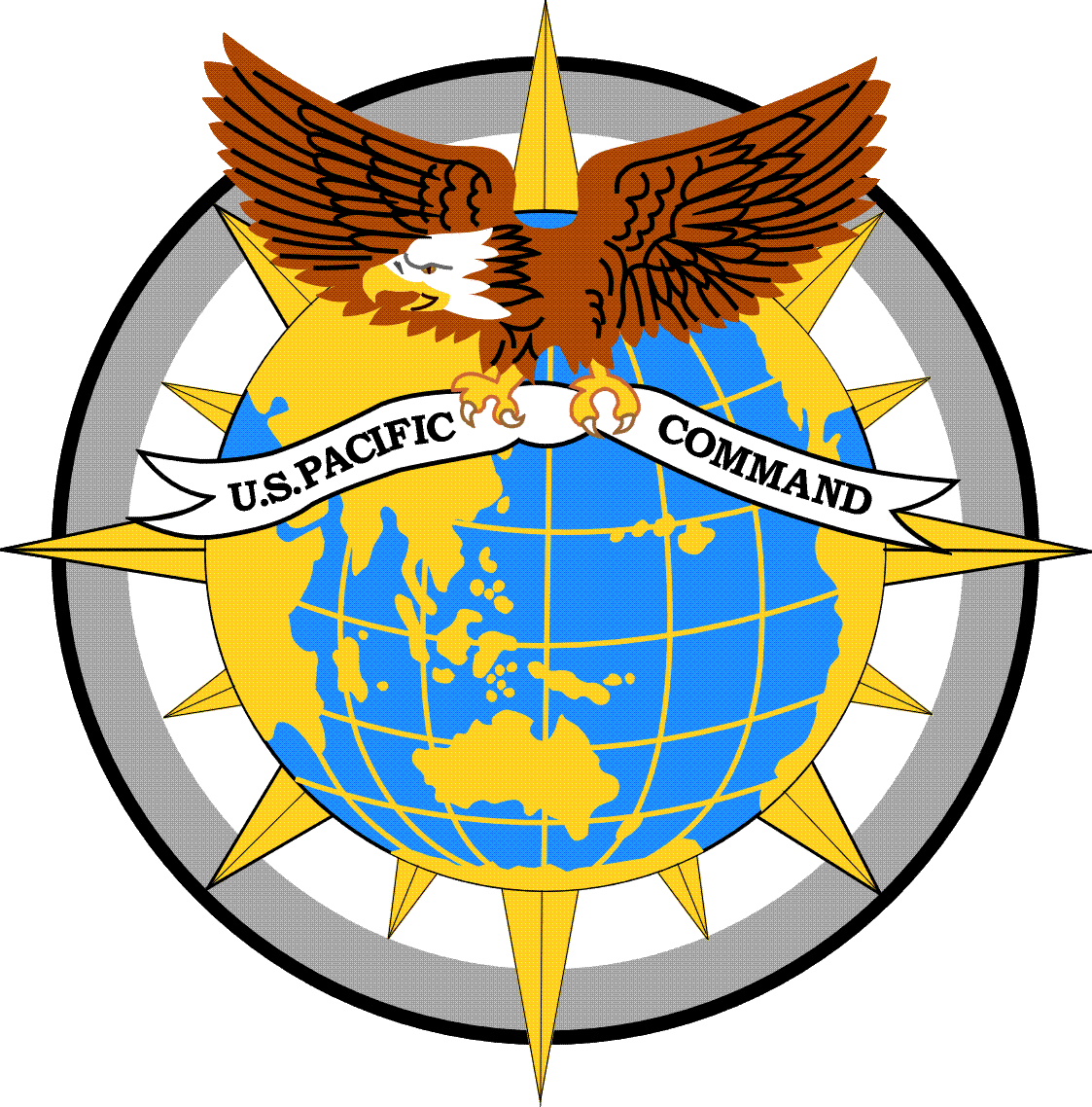
United States Pacific Command badge

Defense Distinguished Service Medal with 1 bronze oak leaf cluster
Navy Distinguished Service Medal with 1 gold award star
Defense Superior Service Medal
Legion of Merit with four award stars
Bronze Star Medal
Meritorious Service Medal with 3 award stars
Navy Commendation Medal with 1 award star
Navy Achievement Medal with 2 award stars
Navy Unit Commendation
Navy Meritorious Unit Commendation with 1 bronze service star
Navy "E" Ribbon
National Defense Service Medal with 2 service stars
Armed Forces Expeditionary Medal
Southwest Asia Service Medal
Global War on Terrorism Expeditionary Medal
Global War on Terrorism Service Medal
Armed Forces Service Medal
Navy Sea Service Deployment Ribbon with 1 silver service star
Navy & Marine Corps Overseas Service Ribbon
Honorary Officer of the Order of Australia
Knight Grand Cross of the Order of the Crown of Thailand
NATO Meritorious Service Medal
Kuwait Liberation Medal (Kuwait)

Military offices
Preceded by Gary Roughead	Commandant of United States Naval Academy; 78th	Succeeded by John R. Allen
Preceded by Robert F. Willard	Commander of United States Pacific Command; 2012–2015	Succeeded by Harry B. Harris Jr.
