= Stephanie Aaronson =

American economist

- Education: Ph.D. economics M.A. & M.Phil. economics B.A. history Columbia University
- Occupation: Labor economist
- Employer: Federal Reserve Board
- Title: Senior Associate Director

Stephanie Aaronson is an American economist. She received her PhD in economics from Columbia University. Aaronson is a Senior Associate Director in the Division of Research and Statistics at the Federal Reserve Board. From 2018-2022 she was Vice President and Director of the Economic Studies Program at the Brookings Institution. She specializes in labor economics and her current research focuses on labor force participation in the United States. Her work has been published in academic journals, such as the Review of Income and Wealth and the Brookings Papers on Economic Activity. Her research has been featured in prominent news publications, including The New York Times and The Economist.

== Education ==
Aaronson holds a Bachelor of Arts in history, a Master of Philosophy in economics and a Master of Arts in economics from Columbia University. She earned her PhD in economics from Columbia University in 2001. Her dissertation was titled "Changing Wage Growth 1967-1997: Causes and Consequences" and focused on trends in wage growth, and its relationship with technological change and labor force participation across different demographic groups.

== Career ==
=== Federal Reserve Board (2000–2018) ===
After graduating with her Ph.D. in economics, Aaronson began working at the U.S. Federal Reserve Board (FRB) in 2000. Aaronson has spent the majority of her career working at the FRB, where she held a number of titles and positions over an 18-year period. These included serving as economist and principal economist in the Macroeconomic Analysis Section from 2000 to 2012, as chief of the Macroeconomic Analysis Section from 2012 to 2014,as an Assistant Director, and currently as Senior Associate Director in the Division of Research and Statistics. At the FRB, Aaronson's work involves contributing to the economic forecasts and supporting policymakers and the FOMC. She supervises the sections responsible for producing alternative forecasts and characterizing risks and uncertainty.

=== Brookings Institution (2018–2022) ===
Aaronson joined the Brookings Institution in October, 2018. She held the title of vice president and director of economic studies. She succeeded American economist Ted Gayer in this position. Her work at the Brookings Institution focused on labor force participation in the United States.

=== U.S. Department of the Treasury (2011-2012) ===
From 2011 to 2012 Aaronson served as the Deputy Assistant Secretary for Macroeconomic Policy at the U.S. Department of Treasury, and received the Meritorious Service Award for her service.

=== Additional work ===
She grew up in the United States in Massachusetts, and has spent half of her life in Washington, D.C. She was inspired by her family, due to their interest in politics, to become involved herself. In the spring of 2010, Aaronson was a visiting scholar in the department of economics at Yale University. Aaronson was the first DC Representative on the Board of the American Economic Association's Committee on the Status of Women in the Economics Profession.. She has served on the advisory board for the Journal of Economic Perspectives,. and as a member of the National Academies of Sciences, Engineering, and Medicine Strategy Group on COVID and Rental Evictions.

== Research ==
Aaronson is a labor economist. Over her career, her research has been in the domain of macroeconomic activity, including monetary policy, inflation, and labor force participation in the United States.

=== Labor force participation ===
Most recently, Aaronson's work has contributed to the understanding of the current labor force participation rate in the United States, and what has caused it to fluctuate. Aaronson has stated that she is interested in studying how American economic institutions can be improved to benefit all citizens; In particular, she is focused on understanding how to optimize labor market conditions in order to reduce unemployment.

==== Long-run decline in U.S. labor force participation ====
Aaronson's research has investigated the long-run trend of declining labor force participation in the U.S. since the early 2000s. According to Aaronson and her colleagues, this decline has been significant and is likely to persist.

Moreover, this trend has important consequences for the labor supply in the American economy. Her research explains the relative importance of cyclical and structural factors in causing the recent decline. Her findings suggest that changes in the business cycle had a greater impact on the decline in labor force participation in the early 2000s, as the observed decline corresponded with the 2001 recession and relatively poor economic conditions. However, the continuation of the decline is better explained by structural demographic factors. Most notably, these include the increased portion of the population in older age groups, as they are more likely to have lower labor force participation rates. In addition, their findings also emphasize other structural factors, such as the stabilization of the female labor force participation rate, the decreased labor force participation rate for adult men, and the effect of young people entering the labor force at a later age due to increased years spent in school.

Aaronson and her colleagues have since extended their analysis of the long-run trend for the American labor force participation rate. Their most recent research has re-emphasized the importance of structural factors in explaining the long-run trend of declining labor force participation. According to her findings, the decline in labor force participation is not primarily the result of the Great Recession, but rather structural changes in the economy are the main causal factor.

In fact, the beginning of the decline in labor force participation pre-dates the Great Recession. The most significant of these changes is the aging of the Baby Boomer generation which they argue can account for approximately 50% of the decline. Her findings demonstrate that a decrease in labor force participation among youth has been a significant contributing factor. They note that neither of these effects have been offset by the rise in labor force participation among older workers due to improvements in health and longevity. Using this data, they project that labor force participation will continue to decline, to as low as 61% by 2022.

==== The business cycle and the labor force participation rate ====
Similarly, Aaronson's research has contributed to the understanding of how changes in the business cycle affect labor force participation among different groups of workers in the U.S. economy. This research adds to the findings of economist Arthur Okun in 1973. Okun's research looked at the relationship between a "high pressure" economy and upward mobility. He found that economies characterized by high rates of expansion supported the upward mobility of workers in that economy.

Aaronson and her colleagues' findings corroborated Okun's earlier research. They found that the relationship between labor force participation and the economic expansion was positive and was experienced by both more advantaged and less advantaged groups. This effect held whether the economy was expanding or contracting. However, changes in the business cycle had a relatively greater effect on the labor force participation of disadvantaged groups, including Hispanics, African Americans and people with less than a college degree, compared to whites. In addition, they found that the further expansion of an already strong economy still increased labor force participation among certain groups, particularly African American women with less than a college degree, and that these benefits held over time.

==== The exchange rate and employment instability ====
Related to labor force participation, Aaronson has also done research on the relationship between the exchange rate and employment instability. This research takes into account the impact of economic globalization on labor force participation in the U.S. economy. Aaronson and her colleagues looked at how fluctuations in the exchange rate affect workers likelihood of changing jobs or switching industries. Their findings showed that the effect varies between employment sectors, and also depends on whether the movement in the exchange rate occurs on the import or export side. In manufacturing sectors, appreciation of the U.S. dollar makes it more likely that workers will keep their jobs and remain in the industry in which they are currently employed. For non-manufacturing sectors, the effect depends on whether the fluctuation in the exchange rate occurs on the export or import side. An appreciation in the export exchange rate increases job stability, whereas an appreciation in the import exchange rate makes worker movement between industries more likely.

=== Additional research ===
Aaronson and economist Andrew Figura investigated the consequences of inaccurate measurements of the number of hours worked over the business cycle on important macroeconomic phenomena, such as the markup of price over marginal cost and increasing returns to scale, as well as its implications for previously published research. They note that most research currently uses data from the Current Employment Statistics (CES) survey, which measures the number of hours paid as opposed to the aggregate number of hours worked. They argue that there is a significant discrepancy between these two measurements that may bias the results of existing research, in particular when accounting for the number of hours worked by salaried employees. Because research has relied on the number of paid hours instead of the number of hours worked, they find that current data understates the total number of hours worked by 5%. It also misstates cyclical movements in the workweek by 27%. Taking these inaccurate measurements into account, they find that productivity growth between 2000 and 2004 has been understated, while productivity growth between 1994 and 2000 has been overstated. These findings have significant implications as they affect the accuracy of data used in academic research and policy making decisions.

== Media coverage ==
Aaronson's research has been cited in a number of prominent American news publications, including The New York Times and The Economist. Both publications reference Aaronson's research about the observed long-run trend of declining labor force participation in the U.S.. In particular, they highlight the structural causes behind the decline, including the aging of the population, among other factors.

== Honors and awards ==
List of honors and awards received
Date	Award	Institution
2012	Award for Meritorious Service	U.S. Department of the Treasury
2001	Honorable Mention, 2001 Dissertation Award	W.E. Upjohn Institute
2000	Wueller Prize for Teaching	Department of Economics, Columbia University
1996–1997	Bradley Fellow	Columbia University
1995–1998	President's Fellowship	Columbia University
