= Ted Gayer =

American economist (born 1970)

- In office August 1, 2022 – March 1, 2026
- Preceded by: Jerry Taylor
- Succeeded by: RJ Lyman

President of the Brookings Institution
- Acting
- In office June 8, 2022 – July 7, 2022*
- Preceded by: John R. Allen
- Succeeded by: Amy Liu (Acting)

Personal details
- Born: May 8, 1970 (age 56)
- Education: Emory University (BA); Duke University (MA, PhD)
- *Allen was placed on leave from June 8, 2022 – June 12, 2022

Ted Gayer (born May 8, 1970) is an American economist and former president of the Niskanen Center. He was formerly an executive vice president at the Brookings Institution, where he was also Director of the Economic Studies Program, and the Joseph A. Pechman Senior Fellow. On June 12, 2022, Gayer was appointed acting president of the Brookings Institution following the resignation of John R. Allen that same day.

Gayer received a BA in mathematics and economics from Emory University in 1992, and a PhD in economics from Duke University in 1997. He was an assistant professor of public policy at Georgetown University from 1997 to 2004, and an associate professor of public policy at Georgetown from 2004 to 2009.

He served as Deputy Assistant Secretary for Microeconomic Analysis at the Treasury Department from 2007 to 2008, and was a senior economist on the Council of Economic Advisers from 2003 to 2004. He was a member of the EPA’s Science Advisory Board from 2004 to 2009, and was appointed a member of the EPA's Superfund Benefits Analysis Advisory Committee in 2005. He was appointed an expert evaluator of the natural resources management indicator for the Millennium Challenge Corporation in 2005.

From 1999 to 2001, Gayer was a Robert Wood Johnson Scholar in Health Policy Research at the University of California, Berkeley. In the summer of 2006, he was a Lone Mountain Fellow at the Property and Environment Research Center. From 2006 to 2007 he was a visiting fellow at the Public Policy Institute of California, and from 2004 to 2006 he was a visiting scholar at the American Enterprise Institute.

His work has been published in the Review of Economics and Statistics, Science, the Journal of Economic Literature, the Journal of Risk and Uncertainty, the Journal of Human Resources, the Journal of Regulatory Economics, Regulation, and other journals. He also co-edited (with W. Kip Viscusi) the two-volume Classics in Risk Management and co-authored (with Harvey Rosen) the 8th and 9th editions of the textbook Public Finance.
