= William G. Leftwich Jr. =

United States Marine Corps officer and recipient of the Purple Heart medal

William Groom Leftwich Jr.
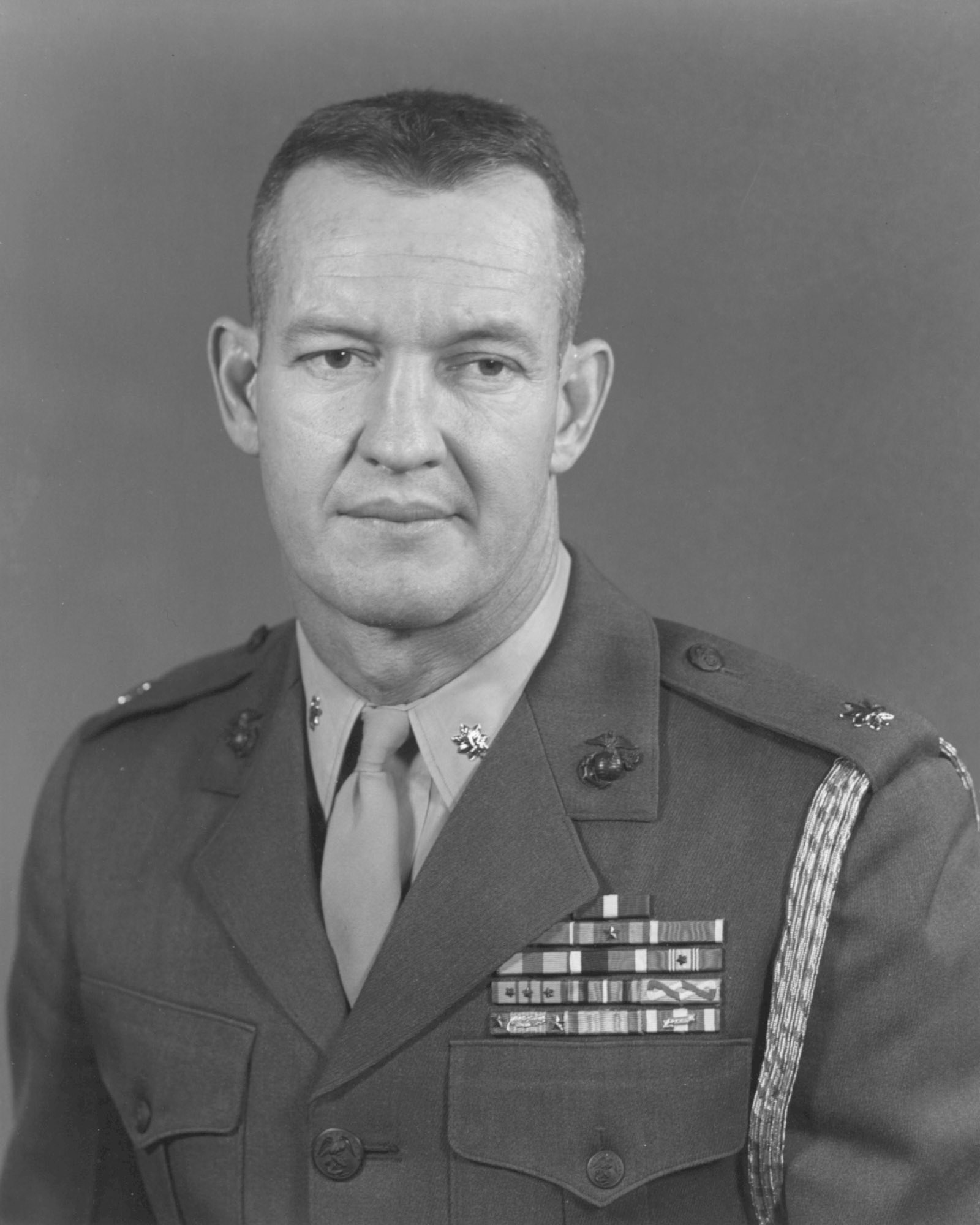
- Leftwich, circa 1968
- Born: April 28, 1931; Memphis, Tennessee, U.S.
- Died: November 18, 1970 (aged 39); Quảng Nam Province, Vietnam
- Military career
- Allegiance: United States of America
- Branch: United States Marine Corps
- Service years: 1953–1970
- Rank: Lieutenant colonel
- Unit: Task Force Alpha
- Commands: 2nd Battalion 1st Marines; 1st Reconnaissance Battalion, First Marine Division
- Conflicts: Vietnam War; Operation Imperial Lake
- Awards: Navy Cross; Silver Star; Legion of Merit (3); Purple Heart (3)

William Groom Leftwich Jr. (April 28, 1931 – November 18, 1970) was an officer of the United States Marine Corps who served during the Vietnam War. In 1970, he was killed in a helicopter crash during a combat mission in the Vietnam War.

== Early life ==
William Leftwich was born on April 28, 1931, in Memphis, Tennessee, to William G. Leftwich, Sr. and Mattie Howard Scrape Leftwich. His father was a graduate of Sewanee, University of the South, a World War One veteran, and a stockbroker. Both his mother and father were from Aberdeen, Mississippi. A graduate of Central High School, he achieved the distinction of serving simultaneously as Class President, Governor of Boys State, Co-Captain of the football team, and commander of the JROTC unit. He was commissioned a second lieutenant on June 5, 1953, upon graduation from the United States Naval Academy. As Brigade Commander in his senior year at the Naval Academy, he was specially commended at graduation for exemplary officer-like qualities, which contributed "to the development of naval spirit and loyalty within the Brigade."

== Military career ==
Upon entering the Marine Corps, Leftwich completed The Basic School at Marine Corps Base Quantico in Virginia in January 1954, and later served as a rifle platoon commander with the 2nd Marine Division at Camp Lejeune in North Carolina. During 1955–56, he served with the 3rd Marine Division on Okinawa. On his return to the United States, he was stationed at Camp Pendleton in California, where he was promoted to captain in July 1957. He then began a three-year assignment at the Naval Academy, serving as a company officer. An athlete himself, he also voluntarily performed collateral duty as assistant varsity tennis coach and battalion football coach.

In 1960, Leftwich rejoined the 2nd Marine Division, serving as a company commander until 1962 when he was named aide-de-camp to the Commanding General. In June 1963, he was assigned as aide to the Commander of Marine Corps Schools. He was promoted to major in July 1964. He later completed a course of study in the Vietnamese language prior to reporting for duty in Vietnam in January 1965 as Assistant Senior Advisor to the Vietnamese Marine Brigade.

Joining Task Force Alfa, Leftwich participated in 27 major operations against the Viet Cong in the central highlands of Vietnam, and spent more than 300 days in the field. He was wounded in the Battle of Hoai An on March 9, 1965, and awarded the Navy Cross and Purple Heart for extraordinary heroism. According to his citation, he "…played a major part in all phases of the successful relief of the village of Hoai An, which was under heavy enemy attack by two Viet Cong battalions… By his own personal example…, he led the attack… Despite injuries by enemy machine-gun bullets in the back, cheek and nose, he went to the aid of a mortally wounded comrade … and delayed his own evacuation until he could call for additional air strikes and brief the task force commander of the situation."

Leftwich returned to the United States in January 1966, served as an instructor at The Basic School, then completed the Command and Staff College in June 1967 and was named to the Schools Honor List. Assigned to Headquarters Marine Corps, he was promoted to lieutenant colonel in November 1967 while serving as a systems analyst with the Manpower Management Information Branch, G-1 Division. He later became head of the Systems Analysis Section. In 1968, he was selected by the Under Secretary of the Navy to be his Special Assistant and Marine Corps Aide. He served in this capacity under Charles F. Baird and John W. Warner.

In April 1970, Leftwich began his second tour of duty in Vietnam, serving initially as the commander of 2nd Battalion 1st Marines. On September 13, he assumed duty as Commanding Officer of 1st Reconnaissance Battalion, 1st Marine Division.

== Death ==
On November 18, 1970, during Operation Imperial Lake Leftwich was killed in a crash of an HMM-263 CH-46D helicopter during an emergency extraction of one of his reconnaissance teams. In accordance with his practice of accompanying every emergency extraction called for by his teams, he was serving as senior "extract officer" for such a mission on the day of his death. The team had incurred casualties and requested an emergency extraction from enemy-infested territory, in an area beginning to be enveloped by dense fog. The team was extracted under Leftwich's personal supervision, then, as the helicopter began its ascent, it crashed into a mountainside in enemy territory, killing all aboard.

== Awards and honors ==
A partial list of Leftwich's medals and awards includes:

Navy Cross		Silver Star	Legion of Merit w/ 2 award stars & valor device
Purple Heart w/ 2 award stars	Meritorious Service Medal	Air Medal	Marine Corps Expeditionary Medal
Navy Occupation Service Medal	National Defense Service Medal w/ 1 service star	Armed Forces Expeditionary Medal	Vietnam Service Medal w/ 4 service stars
Vietnam Navy Distinguished Service Order, 2nd Class	Vietnam Gallantry Cross w/ palm, silver, & bronze stars	Vietnam Civil Actions Medal	Vietnam Campaign Medal

- In 1978, the destroyer USS Leftwich (DD-984) was named in his honor.
- In June 1979, the Marine Corps awarded the very first Leftwich Trophy for Outstanding Leadership in Leftwich's memory. The award is presented annually to an outstanding Marine captain serving with the ground forces of the Fleet Marine Force at the time of nomination.
- The visitor center at the United States Naval Academy is named after LtCol Leftwich and his classmate, Lyle O. Armel II, and is named the Armel-Leftwich Visitor Center.

== Monument ==
A monument that represents him stands at Camp Barrett at Marine Corps Base Quantico. Felix de Weldon sculpted the statue.

== See also ==
- Leftwich Trophy
- USS Leftwich (DD-984)
- List of Navy Cross recipients for the Vietnam War
