= John R. Allen =

US Marine Corps general (born 1953)

John Allen
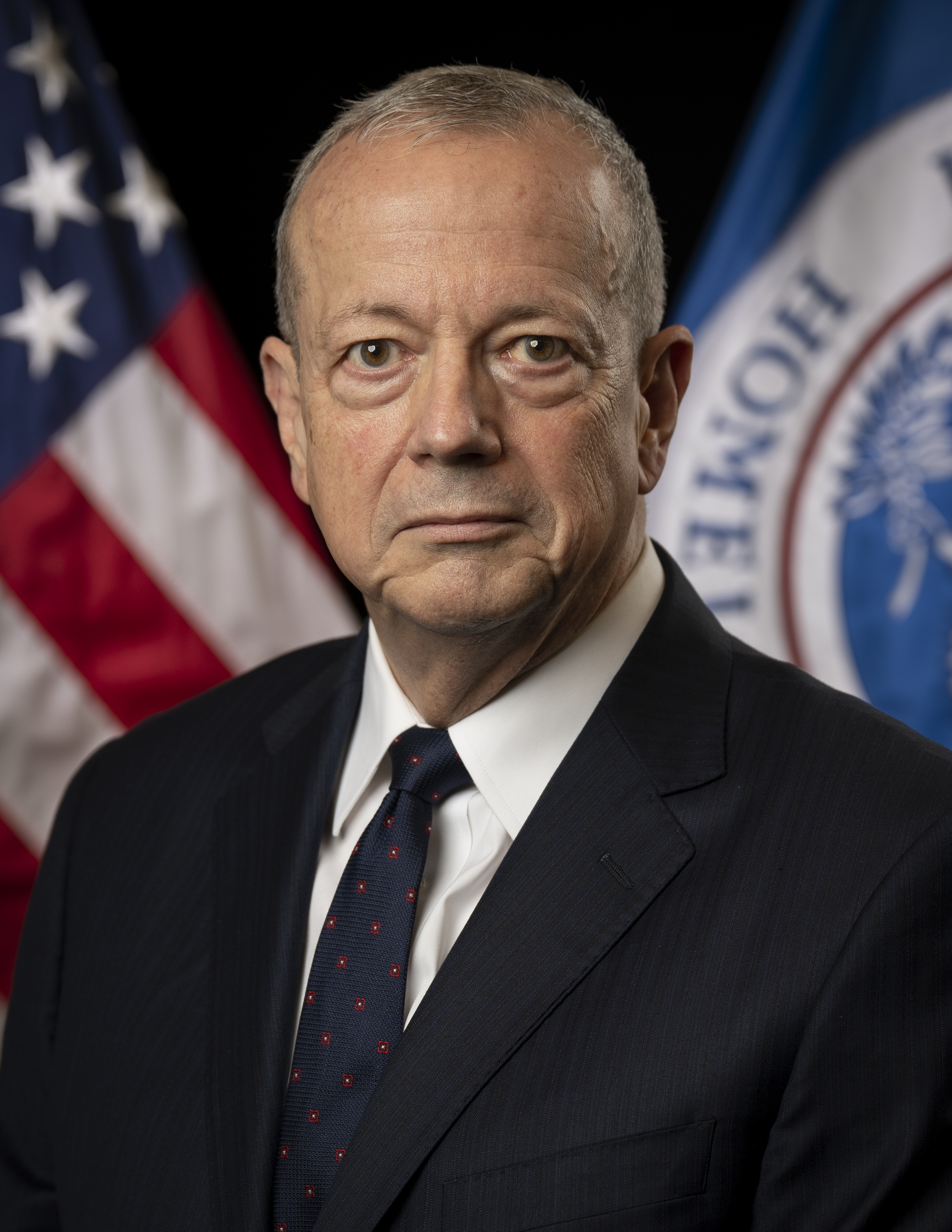

President of the Brookings Institution
- In office 6 November 2017 – 12 June 2022; On leave: 8 June 2022 – 12 June 2022
- Preceded by: Strobe Talbott
- Succeeded by: Ted Gayer (acting)

Special Presidential Envoy for the Global Coalition to Counter the Islamic State of Iraq and the Levant
- In office 16 September 2014 – 23 October 2015
- President: Barack Obama
- Preceded by: Position established
- Succeeded by: Brett McGurk

Commander of the International Security Assistance Force
- In office 18 July 2011 – 10 February 2013
- President: Barack Obama
- Preceded by: David Petraeus
- Succeeded by: Joseph Dunford

Commander of United States Central Command
- Acting
- In office 30 June 2010 – 11 August 2010
- President: Barack Obama
- Preceded by: David Petraeus
- Succeeded by: James Mattis

Personal details
- Born: 15 December 1953 (age 72) Fort Belvoir, Virginia, U.S.
- Party: Democratic
- Education: United States Naval Academy (BS); Georgetown University (MA); National Intelligence University (MS); National Defense University (MS)

Military service
- Allegiance: United States
- Branch/service: United States Marine Corps
- Years of service: 1976–2013
- Rank: General
- Commands: International Security Assistance Force; United States Forces Afghanistan; United States Central Command (Deputy Commander); 2nd Battalion, 4th Marines; 2nd Battalion, 6th Marines; The Basic School; United States Naval Academy – Commandant of Midshipmen; II Marine Expeditionary Force
- Battles/wars: Iraq War; War in Afghanistan
- Awards: Defense Distinguished Service Medal (3); Defense Superior Service Medal; Legion of Merit (4); Leftwich Leadership Trophy
- John R. Allen's voice Allen on U.S. global leadership in the coalition to counter ISIL; Recorded February 25, 2015

John Rutherford Allen (born 15 December 1953) is a retired United States Marine Corps four-star general, and former commander of the NATO International Security Assistance Force and U.S. Forces – Afghanistan (USFOR-A). On 13 September 2014, president Barack Obama appointed Allen as special presidential envoy for the Global Coalition to Counter ISIL (Islamic State of Iraq and the Levant). He was succeeded in that role by Brett McGurk on 23 October 2015. He is the co-author of Turning Point: Policymaking in the Era of Artificial Intelligence with Darrell M. West (Brookings Institution Press, 2020) and Future War and the Defence of Europe alongside Lieutenant General (Ret.) Ben Hodges and Professor Julian Lindley French (Oxford University Press, 2021). Allen was president of the Brookings Institution from October 2017 until his resignation on 12 June 2022.

== Early life and education ==
Allen was born at Fort Belvoir, Virginia, on 15 December 1953; his father, Joseph K. Allen, was a Navy veteran of World War II and the Korean War who retired as a lieutenant commander.

Allen attended Flint Hill School in Oakton, Virginia. He graduated with military honors from the U.S. Naval Academy with the Class of 1976, receiving a Bachelor of Science degree in Operations Analysis. He is a 1998 Distinguished Graduate of the National War College. He holds a Master of Arts degree in National Security Studies from Georgetown University, a Master of Science degree in Strategic Intelligence from the National Defense Intelligence College, and a Master of Science degree in National Security Strategy from the National War College of National Defense University.

== Career ==
Following commissioning in 1976, Allen attended the Basic School and was assigned to 2nd Battalion, 8th Marines, where he served as a platoon and rifle company commander. His next tour took him to Marine Barracks, 8th and I, Washington, D.C., where he served at the Marine Corps Institute and as a ceremonial officer.

Allen then attended the Postgraduate Intelligence Program of the Defense Intelligence College, where he was the Distinguished Graduate. He subsequently served as the Marine Corps Fellow to the Center for Strategic and International Studies (CSIS). He was the first Marine Corps officer inducted as a Term Member of the Council on Foreign Relations.

Returning to the Fleet Marine Force in 1985, he commanded rifle and weapons companies and served as the operations officer of 3rd Battalion, 4th Marines. During this period he received the Leftwich Leadership Trophy. In 1988, Allen reported to the U.S. Naval Academy, where he taught in the Political Science Department and also served as the jump officer and jumpmaster of the academy. In 1990 he received the William P. Clements Award as military instructor of the year.

Allen reported to the Basic School as the director of the Infantry Officer Course from 1990 to 1992 and was subsequently selected by the Commandant of the Marine Corps Fellows Program, which provides "assignment to either a prominent national foreign policy/public policy research institution or to a national security studies program at a selected university". Allen has served as a special assistant on the staffs of the 30th Commandant of the Marine Corps and the commanding general of Marine Corps Combat Development Command. In 1994, he served as the Division G-3 Operations Officer for the 2nd Marine Division and subsequently assumed command of 2nd Battalion, 4th Marines; re-designated as 2nd Battalion, 6th Marines. This unit served with JTF-160 in Operation SEA SIGNAL during Caribbean contingency operations in 1994, and as part of the Landing Force of the 6th Fleet in Operation JOINT ENDEAVOR during Balkans contingency operations in 1995–1996.

Following battalion command, Allen reported as the senior aide-de-camp to the 31st Commandant of the Marine Corps, Charles C. Krulak, ultimately serving as his military secretary.

He commanded the Basic School from 1999 to 2001, when he was selected in April 2001 to return to the Naval Academy as the deputy commandant. Allen became the 79th Commandant of Midshipmen in January 2002, the first Marine Corps officer to serve in this position at the Naval Academy. In January 2003 Allen was nominated for appointment to the rank of brigadier general.

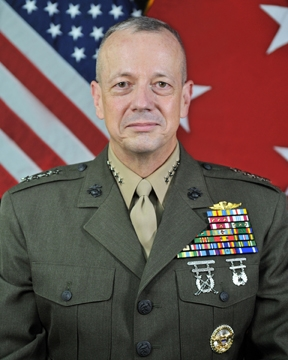
Allen's official military portrait

Allen's first tour as a general officer was as the principal director of Asian and Pacific Affairs in the Office of the United States Secretary of Defense, a position he occupied for nearly three years. From 2006 to 2008, Allen served as deputy commanding general of the II Marine Expeditionary Force and commanding general of the 2nd Marine Expeditionary Brigade, deploying to Iraq for Operation Iraqi Freedom 06–08, serving as the deputy commanding general of Multi-National Forces West and II MEF (Forward) in Al Anbar Province, Iraq. In January 2007 Allen was nominated for appointment to the grade of major general.

In June 2008, Secretary of Defense Robert Gates announced Allen's nomination for promotion to the rank of lieutenant general. He served as the deputy commander of the U.S. Central Command from 15 July 2008 until 18 July 2011, at MacDill Air Force Base. On 30 June 2010, Allen temporarily commanded Central Command after General David Petraeus left to assume command of the International Security Assistance Force in Afghanistan. He served as acting commander until General James Mattis took command on August 11. Allen was promoted to general by Chairman of the Joint Chiefs of Staff, Admiral Mike Mullen prior to his assumption of command of ISAF, and U.S. Forces Afghanistan (USFOR-A) on 18 July 2011.

Allen's foreign awards include the Mongolian Meritorious Service Medal, First Class; the Polish Army Medal in Gold; the Taiwan Order of the Resplendent Banner; the French Legion of Honor; the Order of Merit of the Italian Republic; Honorary Officer of the Order of Australia; and the Ghazi Mir Bacha Khan Medal.

On 6 March 2012, he received the Polish Afghanistan Star Medal from Polish President, Bronisław Komorowski.

On 20 April 2012, he received another Polish award, the Commander's Cross of the Order of Merit of the Republic of Poland.

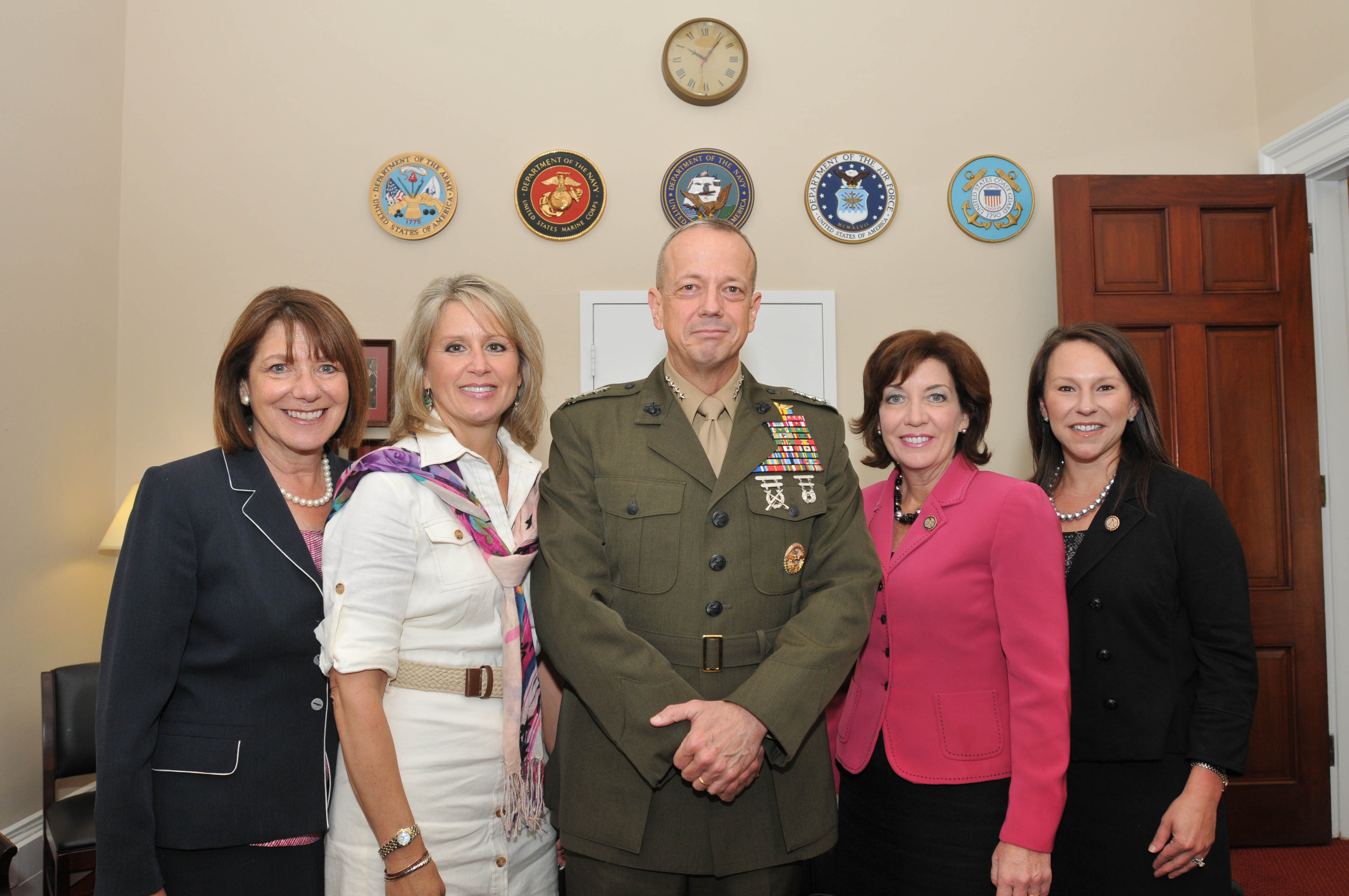
John Allen with members of Congress in May 2012

In November 2012, he was investigated along with Jill Kelley. In response to the investigation, Secretary Panetta suspended his confirmation hearing for commander of EUCOM and requested the U.S. Congress to speed the confirmation of General Joseph F. Dunford, Jr. to command of forces in Afghanistan. On 22 January 2013, Allen was cleared in a misconduct inquiry.

On 10 February 2013, Allen relinquished command of the International Security Assistance Force and U.S. Forces Afghanistan (USFOR-A) to General Dunford.

On 19 February 2013, U.S. President Obama accepted Allen's request to retire from the military as his wife had fallen seriously ill. On 29 April 2013, Allen's retirement ceremony was held at the United States Naval Academy.

=== Post-military career ===
After leaving the military, Allen continued to work as an adviser to Secretary of State John Kerry and former Defense Secretary Chuck Hagel. In this capacity he worked closely with Israeli, Palestinian, and Jordanian interlocutors on the Israeli-Palestinian Peace Plan.

On 12 June 2013, Allen joined the Brookings Institution as a distinguished fellow.

On 11 September 2014, the Obama Administration announced that Allen would coordinate international efforts against the Islamic State in Iraq and Syria. He was named as the Special Presidential Envoy for the Global Coalition against ISIL, a position he would hold for 15 months. Allen's diplomatic efforts increased the size of the coalition to 65 members.

On 23 October 2015, the White House announced his departure from the post. He officially departed that role on 12 November 2015, and was succeeded by Brett McGurk.

Allen is a 2015 co-recipient of the Business Executive for National Security (BENS) Eisenhower Award. He is also a 2016 co-recipient of the Scholar-Statesman Award from The Washington Institute.

On 4 October 2017, Allen was named the seventh president of Brookings, succeeding Strobe Talbott.

Since 2019, he has also been serving on the Transatlantic Task Force of the German Marshall Fund and the Bundeskanzler-Helmut-Schmidt-Stiftung (BKHS), co-chaired by Karen Donfried and Wolfgang Ischinger.

Allen was a member of the Homeland Security Advisory Council until his appointment expired on 31 August 2020.

In March 2021, Allen was presented the Distinguished Graduate Award (DGA) of the United States Naval Academy, an award given to around four or five of the Naval Academy’s sixty thousand living alumni per year. Other recipients of the DGA include President Jimmy Carter, Senator John McCain, Astronauts James Lovell and Charles Bolden, and Roger Staubach.

In March 2022 he was reappointed to the Homeland Security Advisory Council by Secretary of Homeland Security Alejandro Mayorkas

On 8 June 2022, Allen was placed on leave at the Brookings Institution amid a federal investigation into his alleged role in an illegal lobbying campaign on behalf of the wealthy Persian Gulf nation of Qatar. He had not been charged with a crime. He officially resigned from Brookings Institution on 12 June 2022, and executive vice president Ted Gayer was named acting president.

In January 2022, President Biden and the White House announced the appointment of Allen to Board of Visitors of the United States Naval Academy, a position in which he continues to serve.

In April 2023, Allen was inducted as a senior fellow at the Applied Physics Laboratory of the Johns Hopkins University, where his work has focused on matters of national security and technology. In September of that year, Allen was inducted as a fellow of the American Academy of Arts and Sciences. Founded in 1780, the academy counts among its earliest members George Washington, John Adams, and Benjamin Franklin.

Since 2024, Allen has led the GeoTech Center embedded in the GLOBSEC US Foundation. He is also a strategic advisor to Microsoft where he serves on the Microsoft Advisory Council and the Technology and National Security Advisory Council.

== Political role ==
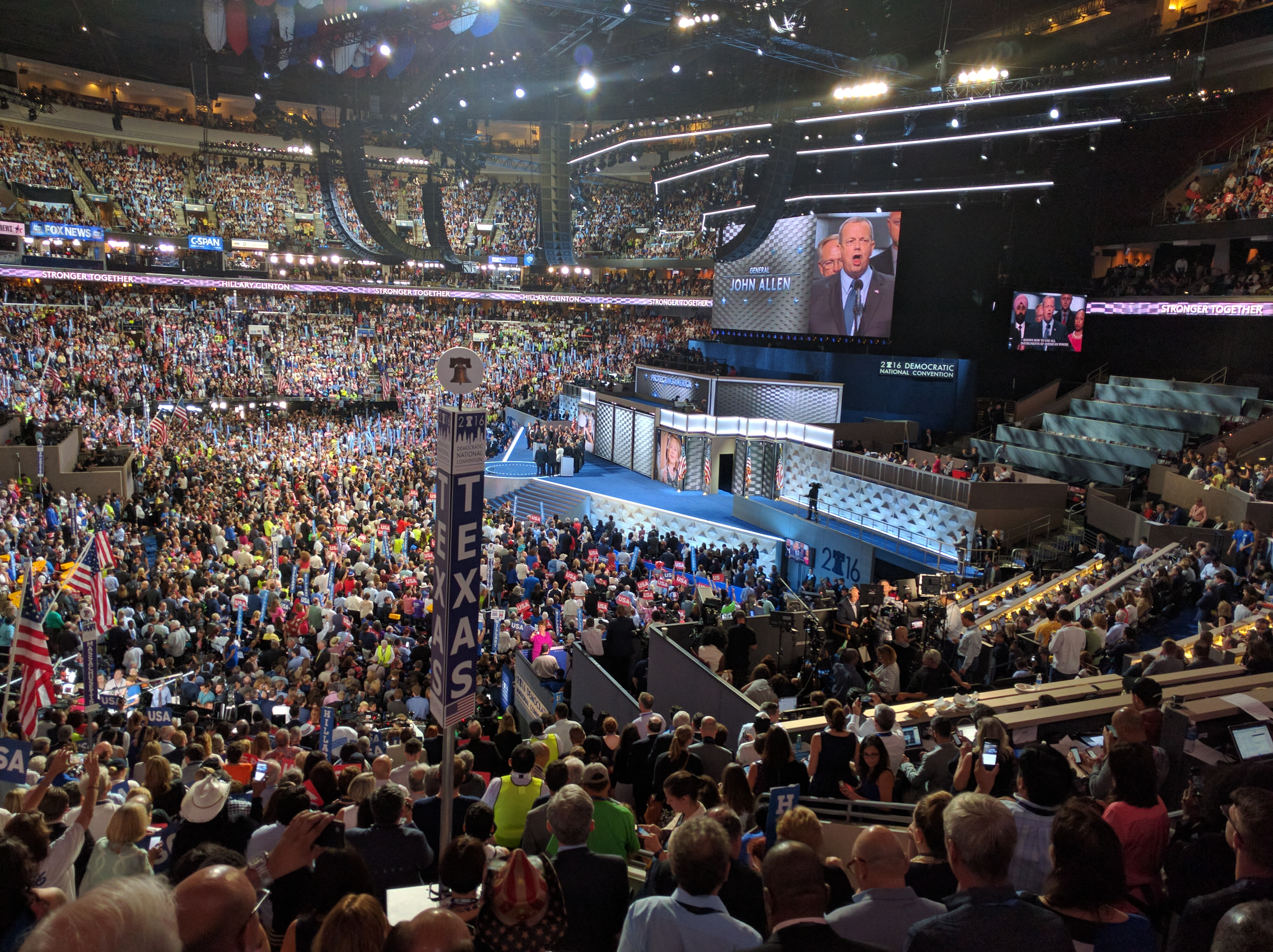
Allen speaking at the 2016 Democratic National Convention

Allen was a featured speaker at the 2016 Democratic National Convention in Philadelphia on July 27, 2016, on the topic of national security, and was later revealed to be on Clinton's list of possible picks for vice president. He criticized Republican nominee Donald Trump and endorsed Hillary Clinton for president.

== FBI investigation ==
In June 2022, Allen's electronic data was reportedly seized in relation to potential illegal lobbying on behalf of the government of Qatar. The data was obtained via a warrant filed in April in a federal district court in Central California. Federal prosecutors obtained records that they believed indicated that Allen had not only secretly lobbied for Qatar, but also lied to investigators about his role, and attempted to withhold evidence that was sought from him via a federally issued subpoena. In January 2023, the Justice Department informed Allen that federal prosecutors had closed the investigation into whether he secretly lobbied for the government of Qatar and that no criminal charges would be brought against him under the Foreign Agents Registration Act, or any other law, based on, or as a result of, Allen's trip to Qatar in June 2017 or the government's investigation of those events.

== Awards and decorations ==
Allen's personal decorations include the following:

U.S. military decorations
Defense Distinguished Service Medal (with 2 Oak Leaf Clusters)
Defense Superior Service Medal
Legion of Merit (with 3 Award Stars)
Defense Meritorious Service Medal
Meritorious Service Medal (gold awards star)
Navy and Marine Corps Commendation Medal (with 3 award stars)
Navy and Marine Corps Achievement Medal
U.S. unit awards
Joint Meritorious Unit Award (with 1 oak leaf cluster)
Navy Unit Commendation with 2 service stars
Navy Meritorious Unit Commendation with 2 service stars
U.S. service (campaign) medals and service and training ribbons
National Defense Service Medal (with 2 Service Stars)
Armed Forces Expeditionary Medal
Afghanistan Campaign Medal (with service star)
Iraq Campaign Medal (with service star)
Global War on Terrorism Expeditionary Medal
Global War on Terrorism Service Medal
Korea Defense Service Medal
Armed Forces Service Medal
Humanitarian Service Medal
Sea Service Deployment Ribbon (with 7 service stars)
International decorations
NATO Meritorious Service Medal
NATO Medal for Yugoslavia with bronze service star

Foreign state decorations
Ghazi Mir Bacha Khan Medal (Afghanistan)
Honorary Officer of the Order of Australia, Military Division
Commander of the Legion of Honour (France)
Order of Merit of the Italian Republic – Grand Officer
Meritorious Service Medal, First Class (Mongolia)
Commander's Cross of the Order of Merit of the Republic of Poland
Polish Army Medal, Gold
Polish Afghanistan Star
Order of the Cloud and Banner with Special Cravat (Taiwan)
U.S. badges
Navy and Marine Corps Parachutist Insignia
Expert Rifle marksmanship badge
Expert Pistol marksmanship badge
Office of the Secretary of Defense Identification Badge

== Books ==
- West, Darrell M.; Allen, John R. (2020). Turning Point: Policymaking in the Era of Artificial Intelligence. Brookings Institution Press. ISBN 978-0-8157-3859-6. JSTOR 10.7864/j.ctvwh8fcb.
- Allen, John R.; Ben Hodges, Frederick; Lindley-French, Julian (2021). "Future War and the Defence of Europe". global.oup.com. Oxford University Press.

== Notes ==
Military offices
Preceded by Samuel J. Locklear	Commandant of Midshipmen of the United States Naval Academy; 2002–2003	Succeeded by Charles J. Leidig
Preceded by Martin Dempsey	Deputy Commander of the United States Central Command; 2008–2011	Succeeded by Robert Harward
Preceded by David Petraeus	Commander of United States Central Command; Acting; 2010	Succeeded by James Mattis
Preceded by David Petraeus	Commander of the International Security Assistance Force; 2011–2013	Succeeded by Joseph Dunford
Diplomatic posts
New office	Special Presidential Envoy for the Global Coalition to Counter the Islamic State of Iraq and the Levant; 2014–2015	Succeeded by Brett McGurk
Non-profit organization positions
Preceded by Strobe Talbott	President of the Brookings Institution; 2017–2022	Succeeded by Ted Gayer; Acting
