= W. Kip Viscusi =

American economist (born 1949)

- Born: October 3, 1949 (age 77); Trenton, New Jersey, US

Academic background
- Education: Harvard University (A.B.), (M.P.P.), (A.M.), (Ph.D.)

Academic work
- Institutions: Vanderbilt University; Harvard University; Duke University; Northwestern University; University of Chicago
- Website: https://www.wkipviscusi.com/

William (W. Kip) Viscusi (born October 3, 1949) is an American economist whose primary fields of research are the economics of risk and uncertainty, risk and environmental regulation, law and economics, and behavioral economics. Viscusi is the University Distinguished Professor of Law, Economics, and Management at Vanderbilt University Law School where he and his wife, Joni Hersch, are the founders and co-directors of the Ph.D. Program in Law and Economics. Prior to his appointment at Vanderbilt, Viscusi was the first John F. Cogan Jr. Professor of Law and Economics at Harvard Law School and Director of the Harvard Program on Empirical Legal Studies. Viscusi is the author of Pricing Lives: Guideposts for a Safer Society.

== Education ==
Viscusi was born in Trenton, New Jersey. Raised in Louisville, Kentucky, he graduated from St. Xavier High School in 1967 and was inducted into the school's Hall of Honors in 2007. Viscusi was the recipient of the 2015 Outstanding Alumnus Award from St. Xavier. Viscusi majored in economics and earned an A.B. degree summa cum laude from Harvard College in 1971, where he was a member of Phi Beta Kappa society. His undergraduate thesis, which was directed by Richard Zeckhauser, won the 1970–1971 Allyn A. Young Prize for best Harvard undergraduate economics thesis. Viscusi also earned a M.P.P. in Public Policy in 1973, an A.M. in Economics in 1974, and his Ph.D. in economics in 1976 all from Harvard University. His dissertation, which was chaired by Nobel laureate Kenneth Arrow, won the 1975–1976 David A. Wells Prize for best Harvard economics Ph.D. dissertation in 1975–1976.

== Career ==
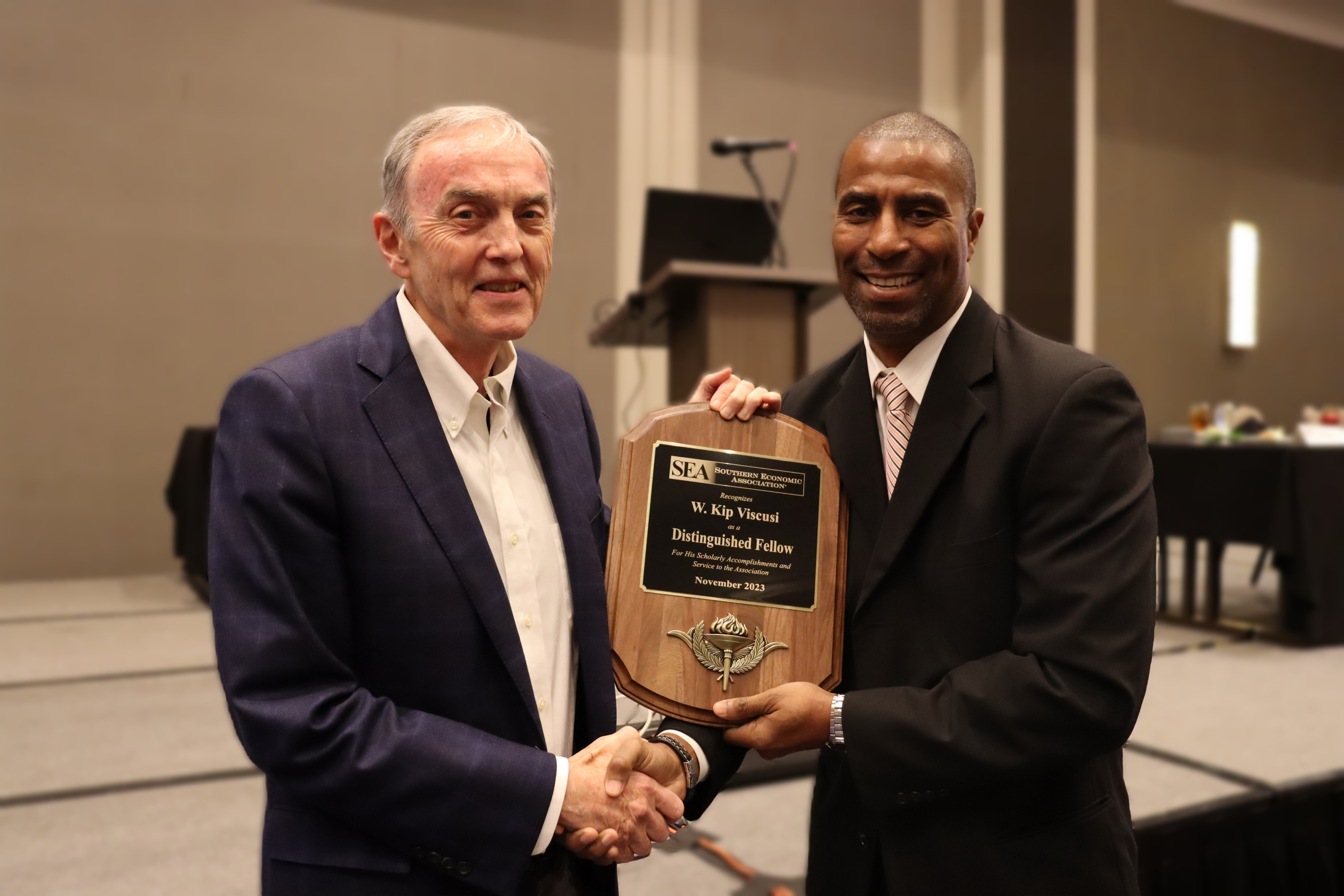
Viscusi awarded the Distinguished Fellow Award at the Southern Economic Association Annual Meeting 2023

W. Kip Viscusi is Vanderbilt University's first University Distinguished Professor. Prior to joining the Vanderbilt law faculty in 2006, Viscusi was appointed to a tenured position as the first John F. Cogan Jr. Professor of Law and Economics at Harvard Law School from 1996 to 2006. He was also the Director of the Harvard Program on Empirical Legal Studies during that period. Previously, he was the Olin Visiting professor of economics in 1995 at Harvard Law School. Viscusi was the George G. Allen Professor of Economics at Duke University from 1988 to 1996, Professor of Economics at Northwestern University in 1985–1988, and the Olin Visiting research professor of economics at the University of Chicago in 1985–1986. Viscusi has also held tenured faculty appointments at Duke University's Fuqua School of Business, and he received tenure from Northwestern University in 1979, where he began his academic career as assistant professor of economics in 1976. In 2014 he served as Vice President of the Society for Benefit-Cost Analysis, and in 2015 he served as president. He served as the President-Elect of the Southern Economic Association in 2019 and President in 2020. In 2019 Viscusi received the Earl Sutherland Prize for Achievement in Research, which is the most prestigious faculty honor for accomplishments in research at Vanderbilt University. Viscusi was also inducted into the inaugural group of Fellows of the Society for Benefit-Cost Analysis in 2021 and the inaugural group of Distinguished Fellows of the Southern Economic Association in 2023.

== Government work ==
From 1979 to 1980 Viscusi was the deputy director of the Council on Wage and Price Stability. This executive branch agency within the Carter White House was responsible for regulatory oversight and administration of the pay and price guidelines. In 1981 he was Research Associate at the National Commission for Employment Policy before returning to his academic position. In 1982 he was asked by the Reagan Administration to resolve a dispute between the U.S. Department of Labor and the U.S. Office of Management and Budget over the economic merits of the proposed hazard communication regulation. His analysis introduced the use of economic value of statistical life estimates based on his estimates of workers' wage-risk tradeoffs into agency benefit assessments. This approach led to much greater benefits than the previous human capital approach so that the regulation now passed a benefit-cost test. The use of this value-of-statistical-life methodology is now the standard practice in the federal government.

Viscusi also has served as member of numerous panels of the U.S. Environmental Protection Agency Science Advisory Board including the Environmental Economics Advisory Committee, the Clean Air Act Compliance Analysis Council, and the Homeland Security Advisory Committee. His estimates of the value of statistical life are widely used by government agencies throughout the federal government to value the benefits of risk and environmental regulations.

== Publications ==
Viscusi has published more than 30 books and over 400 articles. He has pioneered many areas of the economics of risk and uncertainty. His contributions have focused primarily on individual and societal responses to health and safety risks. Pricing Lives: Guideposts for a Safer Society won the American Risk and Insurance Association’s Kulp-Wright award for the best book of the year, as have four of his previous books. As of 2022, he is the third most frequently cited U.S. law professor (Google Scholar h-index). He is also ranked 6th in law-specific citations among U.S. law professors (Google Scholar d-index), according to Brian Leiter's Law School Reports.

Viscusi and Mark J. Machina founded the Journal of Risk and Uncertainty in 1987. The first two volumes were co-edited with Mark J. Machina. Viscusi has been the sole editor since 1989. The journal publishes 6 issues a year and is published by Springer.

== Honors and awards ==
- 1971 – Allyn A. Young Prize, Harvard University, for the best undergraduate economics thesis
- 1976 – David A. Wells Prize, Harvard University, for the best economics Ph.D. dissertation
- 1988 – Best Article of the Year Award, Western Economic Association, for “The Quantity-Adjusted Value of Life,” with Michael J. Moore
- 1992 – Kulp Memorial Award, American Risk and Insurance Association, for Compensation Mechanisms for Job Risks: Wages, Workers’ Compensation and Product Liability, with Michael J. Moore
- 1993 – Kulp Memorial Award, American Risk and Insurance Association, for Reforming Products Liability
- 1994 – Kulp Memorial Award, American Risk and Insurance Association, for Fatal Tradeoffs: Public and Private Responsibilities for Risk
- 1996 – Arne Ryde Memorial Lectures, for Rational Risk Policy
- 1999 – Mehr Award for Lasting Contribution to the Risk and Insurance Literature, American Risk and Insurance Association, for “Price and Availability Tradeoffs of Automobile Insurance Regulation,” with Henry Grabowski and William N. Evans
- 1999 – Royal Economic Society Prize for an outstanding article published in The Economic Journal, for “Alarmist Decisions with Divergent Risk Information”
- 2000 – Kulp Memorial Award, American Risk and Insurance Association, for Rational Risk Policy
- 2006 – Ronald H. Coase Prize, University of Chicago Law School, for “Recollection Bias and the Combat of Terrorism,” with Richard Zeckhauser
- 2006 – Distinguished Economist of the Year, Kentucky Economic Association
- 2007 – Inducted into the St. Xavier High School Hall of Honors
- 2015 – Outstanding Alumnus Award, St. Xavier High School
- 2017 – Best Article Award, Society for Benefit-Cost Analysis, for “Rational Benefit Assessment for an Irrational World: Toward a Behavioral Transfer Test,” with Ted Gayer
- 2019 – Best Article Award, Society for Benefit-Cost Analysis, for “Best Estimate Selection Bias in the Value of a Statistical Life”
- 2019 – Earl Sutherland Prize for Achievement in Research, Vanderbilt University
- 2020 – Kulp-Wright Book Award, American Risk and Insurance Association, for Pricing Lives: Guideposts for a Safer Society
- 2021 – Named an inaugural Fellow of the Society for Benefit-Cost Analysis
- 2023 – Named an inaugural Distinguished Fellow of the Southern Economic Association

== Bibliography ==
- W. Kip Viscusi; James Hamilton (1999). Calculating Risks?: The Spatial and Political Dimensions of Hazardous Waste Policy. MIT Press. ISBN 978-0262082785.
- W. Kip Viscusi (2004). Regulation through Litigation. Brookings Institution Press. ISBN 978-0815798859.
- W. Kip Viscusi; Joseph E. Harrington Jr.; David E.M. Sappington (2018). Economics of Regulation and Antitrust. MIT Press. ISBN 9780262038065.
- W. Kip Viscusi (2010). Smoke-Filled Rooms: A Postmortem on the Tobacco Deal. University of Chicago Press. ISBN 978-0226857480.
- W. Kip Viscusi (2018). Pricing Lives: Guideposts for a Safer Society. Princeton University Press. ISBN 978-0691179216
