= Journal of Risk and Uncertainty =

- Discipline: Economic theory
- Language: English
- Edited by: W. Kip Viscusi

Publication details
- History: 1988–present
- Publisher: Springer Science+Business Media
- Frequency: Bimonthly
- Impact factor: 3.977 (2021)

Standard abbreviations
- ISO 4: J. Risk Uncertain.

Indexing
- CODEN: JRUNEN
- ISSN: 0895-5646 (print); 1573-0476 (web)
- LCCN: 98660686
- OCLC no.: 16689184

Links
- Journal homepage; Online archive

The Journal of Risk and Uncertainty is a bimonthly peer-reviewed academic journal covering the study of risk analysis and decision-making under uncertainty. It was established in 1988 and is published by Springer Science+Business Media. The editor-in-chief is W. Kip Viscusi (Vanderbilt University Law School), who was also the journal's founding editor. According to the Journal Citation Reports, the journal has a 2021 impact factor of 3.977.
