= Operation Imperial Lake =

Part of the Vietnam War (1970–1971)

- Part of the Vietnam War
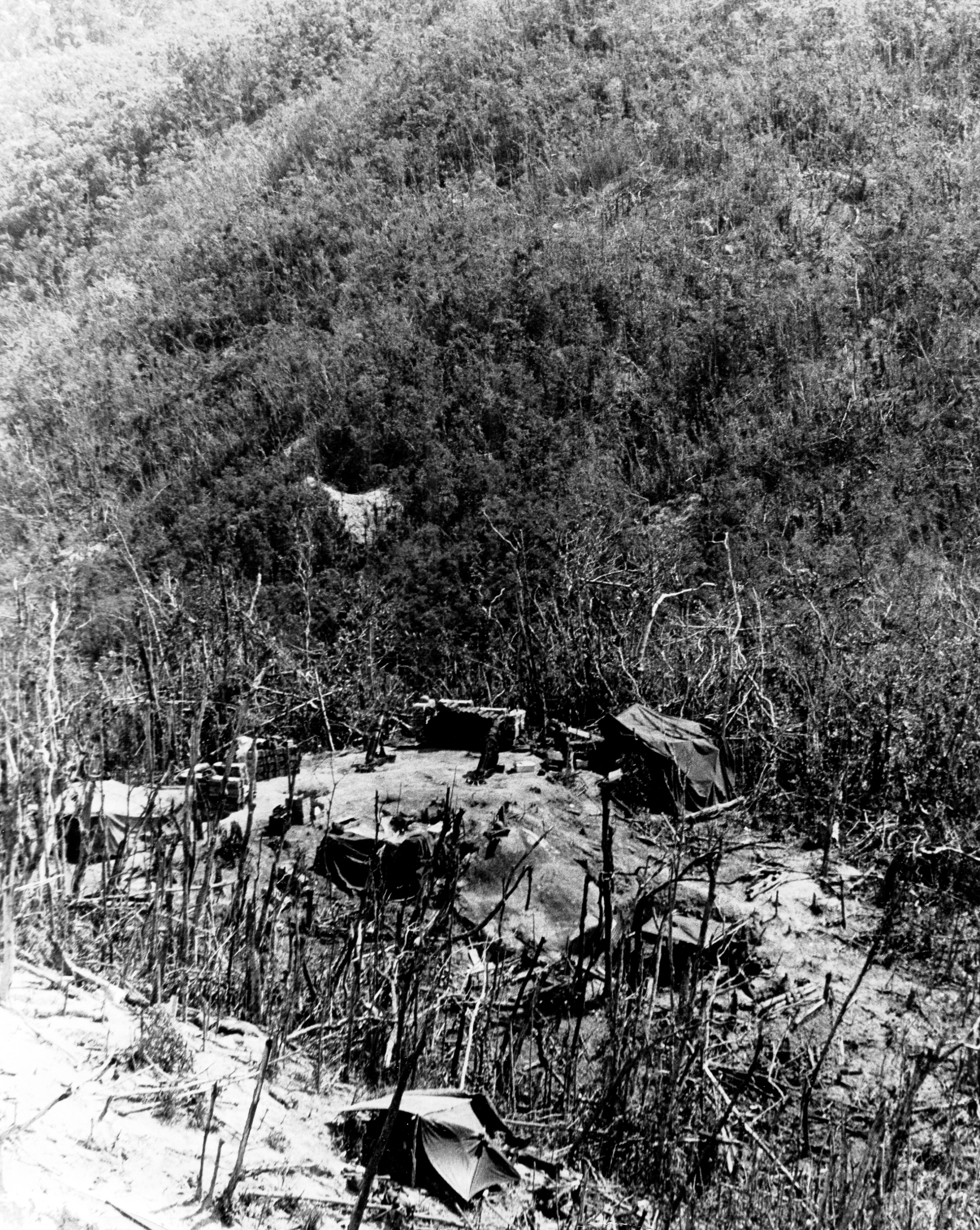
- Landing Zone Vulture, Hill 845, Quế Sơn Mountains
Date	1 September 1970 – 7 May 1971
Location	Quế Sơn District, Quảng Nam Province

Belligerents
United States; South Korea	North Vietnam; Viet Cong

Commanders and leaders
MG Charles F. Widdecke	

Units involved
(United States) 1st Marine Division (South Korea) 2nd Marine Battalion	

Casualties and losses
(United States) 24 killed	296 killed

Operation Imperial Lake was a U.S. Marine Corps, Republic of Korea Marine Corps and U.S. Army operation in the Quế Sơn District, Quảng Nam Province, South Vietnam that took place from 1 September 1970, to 7 May 1971. It was the last operation of the 1st Marine Division during the Vietnam War.

== Background ==
The Quế Sơn mountains located approximately 20 miles (32 km) south of Danang had long been a People's Army of Vietnam (PAVN) and Viet Cong (VC) base area, and numerous operations had been mounted against the mountains and valley throughout the war. From late June 1970, the 7th Marine Regiment had been rotating reinforced rifle companies on 5-day patrols of the area, which regularly uncovered PAVN/VC positions and engaged in small skirmishes.

On 13 August, Companies I and L, 3rd Battalion, 7th Marines and Company A, 1st Battalion, 5th Marines began Operation Ripley Center in the central Quế Sơn mountains. On 15 August, Company A, 1/5 Marines was withdrawn from the operation and on 24 August, 2nd Battalion, 7th Marines was landed in the area and took over the operation. The Marines uncovered numerous PAVN/VC facilities and killed 25 PAVN/VC and captured eight for no Marine losses. The operation concluded on 31 August.

In August the 1st Marine Division and the 7th Marine Regiment staffs began planning a large operation to pacify the Quế Sơn mountains, which were believed to harbor the PAVN's Front 4 Headquarters, the D3, R20 and V25 Infantry Battalions, the 42nd Reconnaissance Battalion and the 3D, T89 and T90 Sapper Battalions. The plan called for an intensive air and artillery bombardment intended to drive the PAVN/VC into shelters allowing the 2/7 Marines to land at 12 separate landing zones, the 1st Platoon, Company D, 1st Reconnaissance Battalion to establish 3 observations posts, and for the mortar battery of 3rd Battalion, 11th Marines to establish a firebase on Hill 845.

== Operation ==
=== August to December 1970 ===
After midnight on 31 August, 10 Marines artillery batteries began shelling 53 targets in the Quế Sơn mountains; when the bombardment ended at 06:45 a total of 13,488 shells had been fired. The artillery barrage was immediately followed by two hours of airstrikes and then at 09:00 the first helicopters began landing the Marines. The 2/7 Marines command post was established on Hill 845, now named Landing Zone Vulture (15.753°N 108.178°E). The Marine landings were unopposed, and they made no contact with the PAVN/VC over the next four days.

==== September ====
On 5 September, Company E pursued a PAVN soldier into a cave in a ravine near LZ Vulture and were met by heavy weapons fire. The other three companies moved to the area and proceeded to engage an estimated 30-50 PAVN in the ravine in close combat over the next three days. On 9 September, after having lost 3 Marines killed in the ravine, the Marines were pulled back to allow air strikes on the area. By 12 September the Marines had pacified the area with the PAVN having been killed, sealed in caves or withdrawn from the ravine. From 14 to 30 September, the Marines killed 14 PAVN/VC in ambushes throughout the operational area.

On 13 September, 3/7 Marines joined the operation landing southwest of the 2/7 Marines position. On 20 September, the 3/7 Marines launched Operation Imperial Lake South, which continued until the end of September with minimal results.

On 16 September, a VC defector led Company E, 2/7 Marines to two base camps of the 91st Sapper Battalion. On 20 September, the Marines found a headquarters and hospital complex in caves and tunnel underneath LZ Vulture and captured two VC medical corpsmen who revealed that the complex had been evacuated after the 31 August bombardment.

On 22 September, Company F, 2/7 Marines left the operation, and on 23 September, Company G, the mortar battery and the 2/7 Marines command group redeployed to Landing Zone Baldy, leaving only Company E in the area of operations and Company I, 3/7 Marines in the Imperial Lake South area of operations.

At the end of September, the 5th Marine Regiment took over the operation from the 7th Marine Regiment, which was redeploying to the United States as part of Operation Keystone Robin Alpha. Company M, 3rd Battalion, 5th Marines replaced Company E, 2/7 Marines at LZ Vulture, while Company L 3/5 Marines replaced Company I 3/7 Marines in the southern area.

==== October ====
On 18 October, the 1st Marine Division ordered a change to the operation with six-man patrols deployed in the Quế Sơn mountains which would call in a quick reaction force (QRF) at LZ Baldy to exploit any contact. The 1st Reconnaissance Battalion moved to LZ Vulture, now renamed LZ Rainbow, which would serve as the patrol base. On 21 October, Company F, 2nd Battalion, 5th Marines replaced Company M, 3/5 Marines at LZ Rainbow while Company H, 2/5 Marines formed the QRF.

The reconnaissance team/QRF tactics achieved steady results in locating PAVN/VC positions and engaging small units. On 26 October, the QRF discovered an abandoned battalion-size base camp, and on the same day two reconnaissance teams ambushed 10-15 PAVN north of LZ Rainbow killing five. On 27 October, a squad from Company F of the QRF attacked a PAVN camp west of LZ Rainbow killing six before coming under attack themselves losing one Marine killed before air and artillery strikes forced the PAVN to withdraw. By the end of October the Marines had killed 74 PAVN/VC and captured 34 weapons in the operational area.

==== November ====
On 1 November, 1/5 Marines established a forward command post in the northern Quế Sơn mountains, on 6 November, 2/5 Marines established a forward command post on Hill 381 (15.712°N 108.195°E), 4 kilometres (2.5 mi) south of LZ Rainbow and on 26 November, the 1st Reconnaissance Battalion moved its patrol base to Hill 510 (15.7268°N 108.145°E) in the western Quế Sơn mountains.

On 5 November, Company B, 1/5 Marines found an abandoned base camp and documents including the files for the VC security section in Quảng Nam Province identifying leaders and agents.

On 18 November, a HMM-263 CH-46D which was extracting a reconnaissance team by McGuire rig crashed into a mountainside in bad weather 3 kilometres (1.9 mi) southeast of LZ Rainbow, killing all 15 Marines on board, including the Reconnaissance Battalion commander Lt. Col. William G. Leftwich Jr.

On 19 November, a newly formed Republic of Korea Marine Corps (ROKMC) Marine reconnaissance unit joined the operation establishing a base in Hill 322 in the northeast Quế Sơn mountains and they would be joined by the 6th and 7th ROKMC Companies later that month.

==== December ====
On 2 December, the 3/5 Marines command group replaced the 2/5 Marines command group on Hill 381 and the 2/5 command group returned to LZ Baldy before redeploying to Hill 510 on 20 December.

From 16 to 23 December, Companies G and H, 2nd Battalion, 1st Marines operated northwest of Hill 510 with minimal results.

On the afternoon of 24 December, Company L, 3/5 Marines found a group of nine PAVN/VC outside a cave 2.5 kilometres (1.6 mi) southwest of Hill 381, the Marines fired on the group killing four while the remainder fled. Companies K and L searched the caves and discovered a major PAVN/VC command post including three radios, three generators, spares and other equipment which were believed to be part of the elusive Front 4 Headquarters.

By the end of December 1970, the operation had accounted for 196 PAVN/VC killed and 106 captured while 20 Marines and two Navy Corpsmen had been killed.

=== January to May 1971 ===
==== January - February ====
On 8 January, 1/5 Marines withdrew its forward command post and one of its companies from the operation.

On 25 January, 2nd Platoon, Company L, 3/5 Marines engaged 10 PAVN 2.48 kilometres (1.54 mi) northeast of Firebase Ross, killing nine for no losses.

On 13 February, the 2/5 Marines command group replaced the 3/5 Marines command group on Hill 381 and assumed command of the operation. On 15 February Companies K and L, 3/5 Marines were withdrawn to Hill 34 (16.002°N 108.17°E) near Da Nang Air Base for redeployment to the United States.

1st Battalion, 11th Marines took over artillery support replacing the 2/11 Marines who were also being redeployed. With the planned closure of Firebases Ross and Ryder, the 1/11 Marines moved to new firebases in the Quế Sơn mountains at Hills 218, 381, 425 and 510.

In January, and February, the Marines killed 85 PAVN/VC for the loss of one Marine. The operation continued to uncover large quantities of ammunition and supplies, disrupting their logistics network.

==== March - April ====
On 1 March, the 2/5 Marines moved its command post from Hill 381 to LZ Baldy in preparation for their redeployment, on 2 March, the 1st Marine Regiment took control of the operation and established its command post on Hill 510 and on 3 March Companies F and H, 2/5 Marines were withdrawn from the operation.

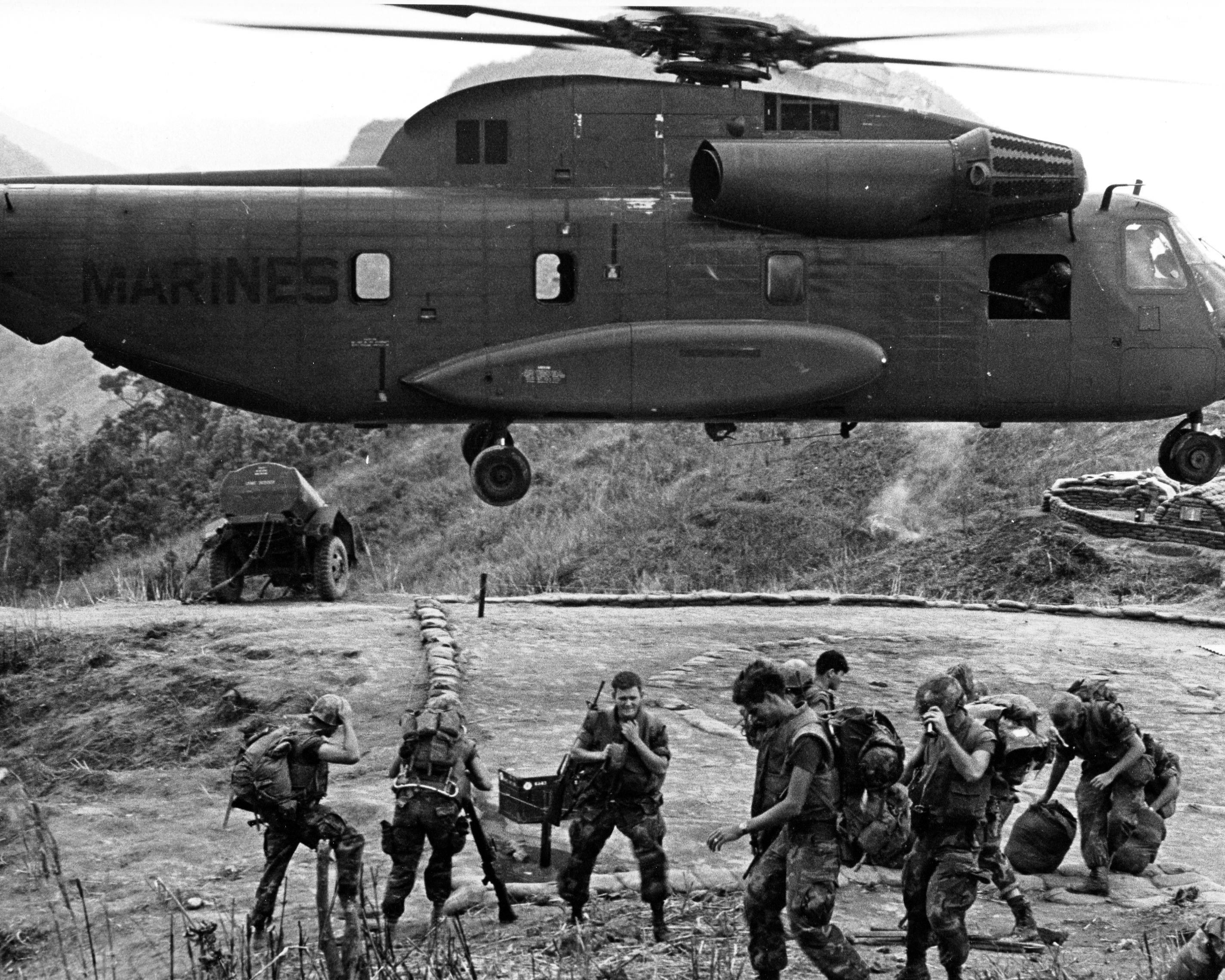
Elements of the 1/5 Marines await a heli-lift from Hill 510 to Hill 34 near Danang

On 23 March, 1/5 Marines moved its command post and two companies from Hill 510 in preparation for redeployment and 3rd Battalion, 1st Marines established their command post on Hill 510 together with Companies K and L.

On 28 March, the 1st Marine Division expanded the Imperial Lake area of operations to include the mountains west and northwest of Danang, known as the "Rocket Belt". On 30 March Companies K and L had left Hill 510 and moved back to the Rocket Belt, leaving one platoon on the hill.

On 6 April, Company B, 3rd Battalion, 21st Infantry Regiment was landed at Hill 510 beginning the handover of the area of operations to the 23rd Infantry Division. From 7, to 8 April, the 3/1 Marines command post and the platoon from Company L, 3/1 Marines left Hill 510. On 13 April the 25th Infantry Division formally assumed control of southern Quảng Nam Province.

== Aftermath ==
Operation Imperial Lake concluded on 7 May 1971. The Marines had lost 24 killed and claimed 296 PAVN/VC killed.
