= USS Leftwich =

Spruance-class destroyer (1979–2003)

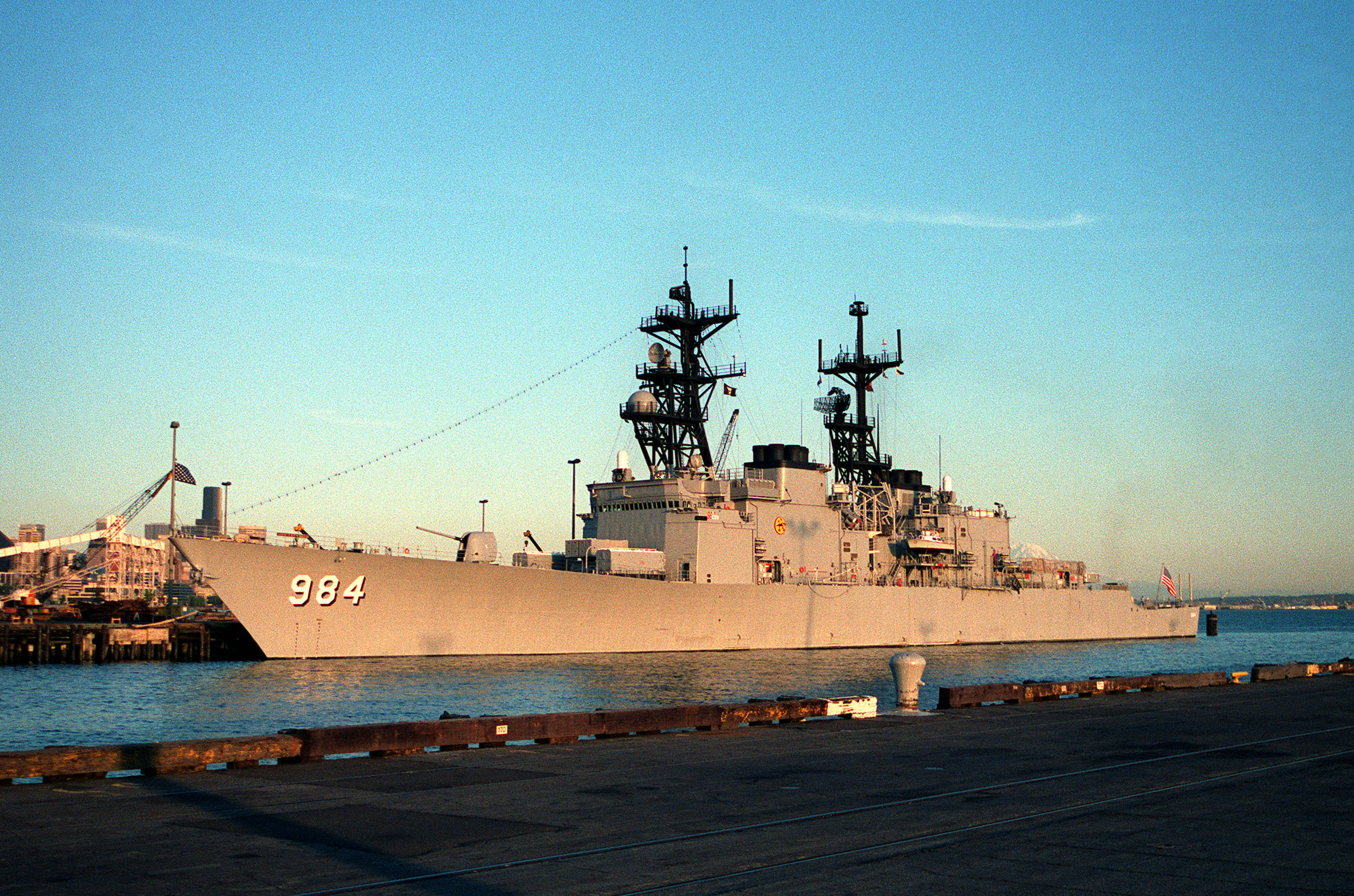
- USS Leftwich in Seattle on 1 August 1986

History

United States
- Name: Leftwich
- Namesake: William G. Leftwich, Jr.
- Ordered: 15 January 1974
- Builder: Ingalls Shipbuilding
- Laid down: 12 November 1976
- Launched: 8 April 1978
- Acquired: 6 August 1979
- Commissioned: 25 August 1979
- Decommissioned: 27 March 1998
- Stricken: 27 March 1998
- Identification: Callsign: NPFD; Hull number: DD-984
- Motto: Superiority Through Teamwork
- Fate: Sunk as target, 1 August 2003
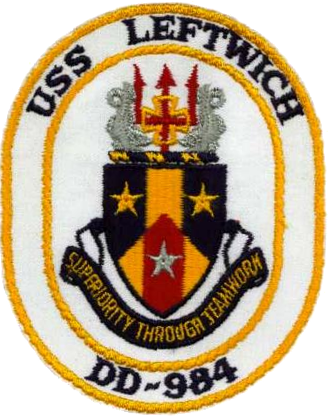
- Badge

General characteristics
- Class & type: Spruance-class destroyer
- Displacement: 8,040 long tons (8,170 t) full load
- Length: 529 ft (161 m) waterline; 563 ft (172 m) overall
- Beam: 55 ft (17 m)
- Draft: 29 ft (8.8 m)
- Installed power: 3 × 501-K17 generator sets (2,000 kW (2,700 hp) each)
- Propulsion: 4 × General Electric LM2500 gas turbines, 2 shafts, 80,000 shp (60 MW)
- Speed: 32.5 knots (60.2 km/h; 37.4 mph)
- Range: 6,000 nmi (11,000 km; 6,900 mi) at 20 knots (37 km/h; 23 mph)
- Complement: 19 officers, 315 enlisted
- Sensors & processing systems: AN/SPS-40 air search radar; AN/SPG-60 fire control radar; AN/SPS-55 surface search radar; AN/SPQ-9 gun fire control radar; Mark 23 TAS automatic detection and tracking radar; AN/SPS-65 missile fire control radar; AN/SQS-53 bow-mounted active sonar; AN/SQR-19 TACTAS towed array passive sonar; Naval Tactical Data System
- Electronic warfare & decoys: AN/SLQ-32 electronic warfare system; AN/SLQ-25 Nixie torpedo countermeasures; Mark 36 SRBOC decoy launching system; AN/SLQ-49 inflatable decoys
- Armament: 2 × 5 in (127 mm) 54 caliber Mark 45 dual purpose guns; 2 × 20 mm Phalanx CIWS Mark 15 guns; 1 × 8 cell ASROC launcher (removed); 1 × 8 cell NATO Sea Sparrow Mark 29 missile launcher; 2 × quadruple Harpoon missile canisters; 2 × Mark 32 triple 12.75 in (324 mm) torpedo tubes (Mk 46 torpedoes); 1 × 61 cell Mk 41 VLS launcher for Tomahawk missiles
- Aircraft carried: 2 × Sikorsky SH-60 Seahawk LAMPS III helicopters
- Aviation facilities: Flight deck and enclosed hangar for up to two medium-lift helicopters

USS Leftwich (DD-984) was a Spruance-class destroyer built by the Ingalls Shipbuilding Division of Litton Industries at Pascagoula, Mississippi. She was named for Lieutenant Colonel William G. Leftwich, Jr., USMC (1931–1970), commander of the 1st Reconnaissance Battalion who was killed in action during Operation Imperial Lake in Quảng Nam Province South Vietnam on 18 November 1970 in a helicopter crash during the extraction of one of his reconnaissance teams. For this action, Lieutenant Colonel Leftwich received the Silver Star. Lieutenant Colonel Leftwich's medals and awards include: the Navy Cross, the Silver Star (posthumous), the Legion of Merit with Combat "V" and two gold stars, the Meritorious Service Medal, the Air Medal with one gold star, the Purple Heart with two gold stars, and various personal awards from the Republic of Vietnam.

Leftwich was laid down on 12 November 1976; and launched 8 April 1978; and commissioned 25 August 1979. The Commissioning speaker was the Chief of Naval Operations, Admiral Thomas B. Hayward, USN, who was a classmate of Bill Leftwich at the United States Naval Academy. Also in attendance at the Commissioning was H. Ross Perot, also a classmate of Lieutenant Colonel Leftwich. Both of Colonel Leftwich's sons and his widow attended the commissioning as well.

== 1979–1985 ==
Leftwich sailed from Pascagoula, MS the morning following the commissioning on 26 August 1979, en route via the Panama Canal for her homeport, Naval Station San Diego, from which she operated until March 1985.

On sailing, Hurricane David was threatening to make its way into the Gulf of Mexico, so shipping traffic on the transit to the Panama Canal was unusually light. Hurricane David did strike the Gulf coast, and was followed shortly after by Hurricane Frederic, which caused many ships at Ingalls Shipbuilding and Drydock to sortie into the hurricane.

The Leftwich made one of the fastest transits on record of the Panama Canal, making the passage without having to anchor. On sailing north in the Pacific Ocean, Leftwich found herself behind Hurricane Guillermo, which tracked along the western coast of Mexico, and then turned westward out into the Pacific, allowing the ship to arrive at her new homeport on schedule. While following the storm, Leftwich experienced 30 feet (9.1 m) waves.

In the few months after arrival in San Diego, CA, Leftwich conducted "Shakedown" training under the guidance of Fleet Training Group, Pacific, in the San Diego Operations Area (OPAREA). In January 1980, Leftwich returned to Litton Industries at Pascagoula, MS for Warranty repairs and a Post-Shakedown Availability, which included the installation of the NATO Sea Sparrow and Harpoon missile system.

On 29 November 1982 she collided with the submarine USS Thomas A. Edison (SSBN-610) approximately 40 miles (64 km) east of Subic Bay, Philippines. Both ships were conducting war games. Thomas A. Edison was at periscope depth when the collision occurred. Both ships suffered damage and returned to Subic Bay. Edison suffered damage to her sail, sail planes, and sonar dome. Leftwich suffered damage to her sonar dome, sonar dome "banjo" strut, and forward fuel storage tanks located in the forward hull. Two months later, Thomas A. Edison made a surface transit to Puget Sound Naval Shipyard for decommissioning without the damage having been repaired.

In 1984, Leftwich suffered hull and sonar window damage due to high-speed operations in heavy seas during fleet exercises on her deployment to Indian Ocean/Western Pacific (WESTPAC 1984).

== 1985–1998 ==
On 1 April 1985 Leftwich arrived at her new homeport of Naval Station Pearl Harbor, Hawaii. This remained her homeport for the rest of her career.

Leftwich, under the command of RADM (then Commander) Daniel Bowler, participated in Operation Nimble Archer on 19 October 1987. This was a response to Iran's 16 October 1987 attack on the MV Sea Isle City, a reflagged Kuwaiti oil tanker at anchor off Kuwait, with a Silkworm missile.

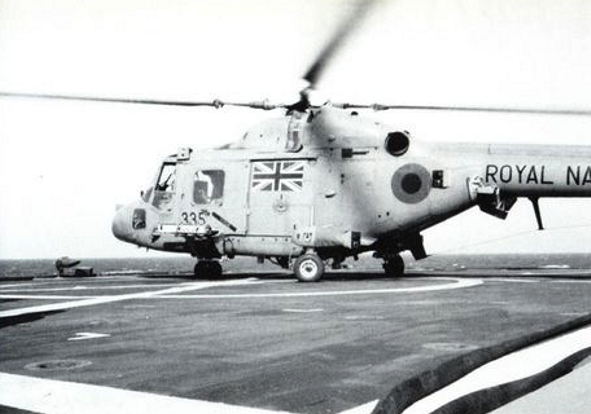
Royal Navy Westland Sea Lynx aboard USS Leftwich in 1991

Leftwich with Helicopter Anti-Submarine Squadron 3 Detachment 5 embarked, arrived at Naval Station Pearl Harbor homeport. In 1990–91, under the command of Commander Patrick Garrett in support of Operation Desert Shield/Desert Storm, the destroyer conducted more than 200 merchant ship interceptions and one boarding. She was one of the first ships to fire BGM-109 Tomahawk cruise missiles during the conflict, and was the first combatant to conduct a wartime reload of Tomahawks for continued operations. With embarked helicopters and SEALs, she captured the first Iraqi territory repatriated in the war (an island off the coast of the al-Faw waterway), multiple enemy prisoners of war, and conducted 16 combat search and rescue cases. For her efforts in the Persian Gulf, The Leftwich and her crew were awarded the Navy Unit Commendation Ribbon and the Combat Action Ribbon.

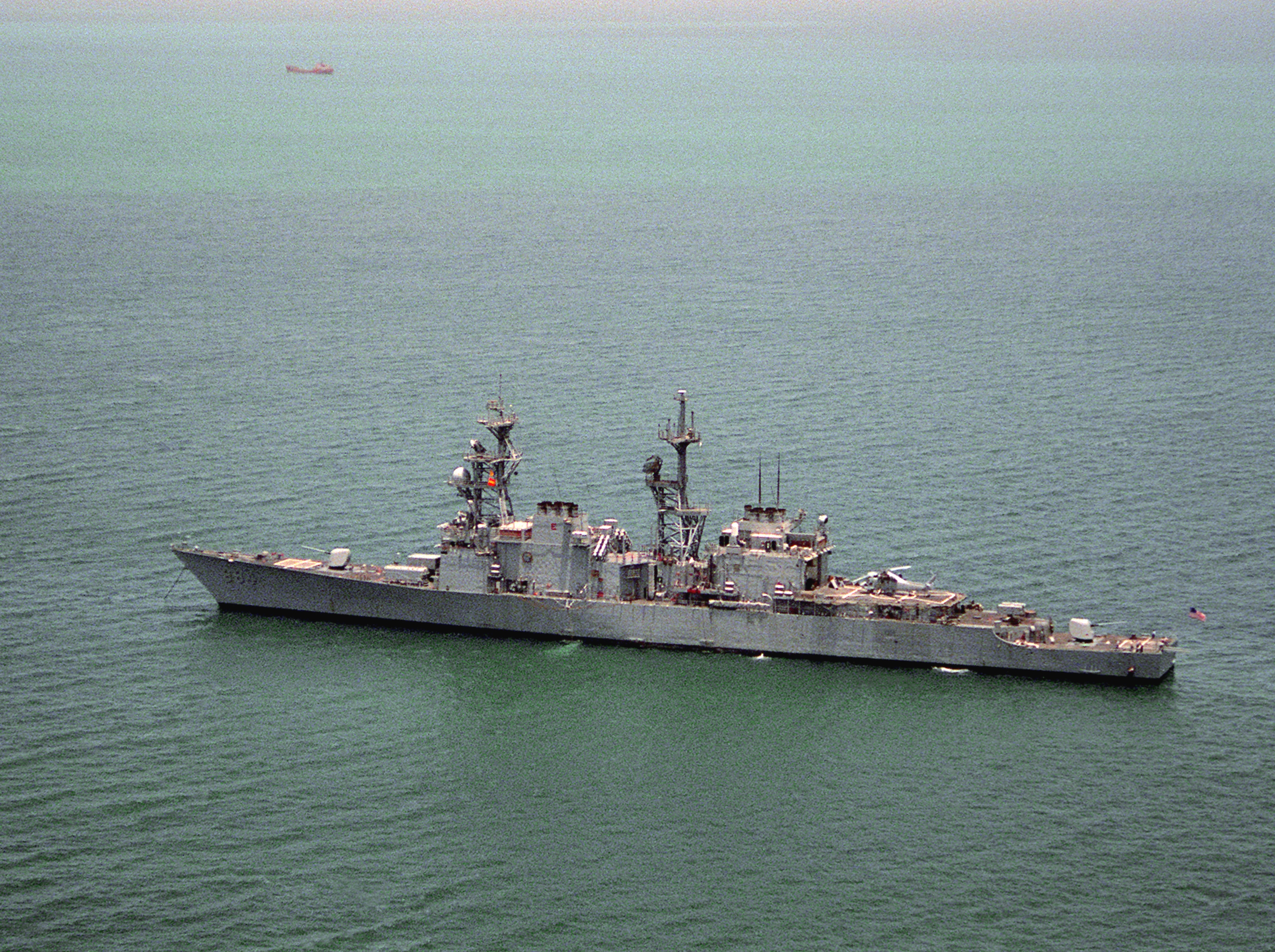
USS Leftwich off Bahrain on 16 May 1993

During her career, Leftwich made eight deployments in the Western Pacific Ocean, Indian Ocean and Persian Gulf. She participated in Operation Nimble Archer, Desert Shield, and Desert Storm as well as operations in support of UN sanctions against Iraq.

Leftwich was decommissioned and stricken from the Naval Vessel Register on 27 March 1998. She was sunk as a target on 1 August 2003 at 22°48′47″N 160°34′00″W in the Pacific Ocean.

== Awards ==
USS Leftwich was awarded the following:

- Combat Action Ribbon
- Navy Unit Commendation
- Navy "E" Ribbon (2nd)
- Navy Expeditionary Medal
- National Defense Service Medal (2nd)
- Armed Forces Expeditionary Medal
- Southwest Asia Service Medal
- Sea Service Ribbon (8th)
- Coast Guard Special Operations Service Ribbon (drug interdiction ops, relieved the Ingersoll for a few days while that ship had to refuel and take on stores after an extensive underway period.)
- Kuwait Liberation Medal (Saudi Arabia)
- Kuwait Liberation Medal (Kuwait)

Chief of Naval Operations Letter of Commendation,

== Gallery ==
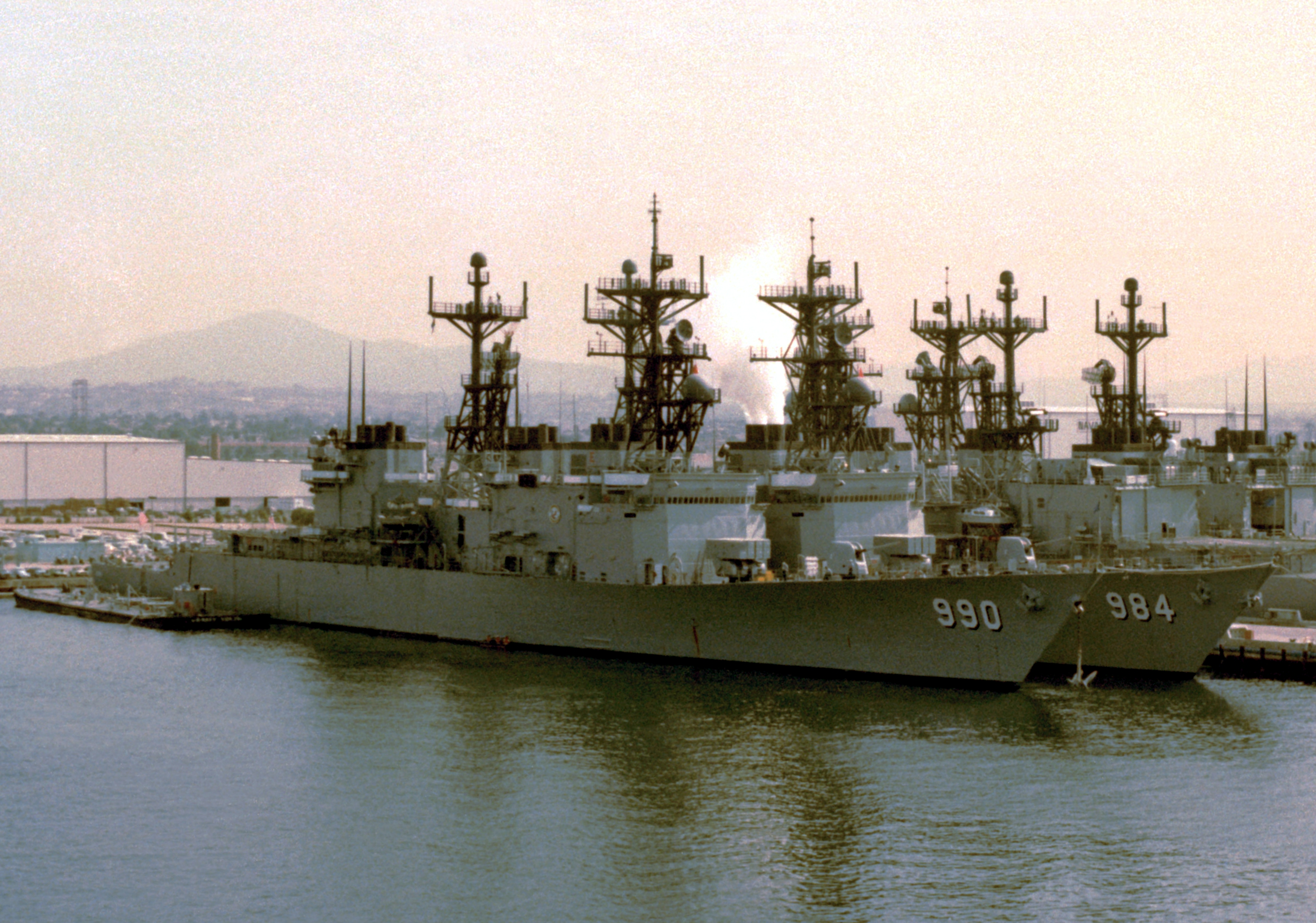
USS Ingersoll and USS Leftwich in Pearl Harbor on 1 April 1983

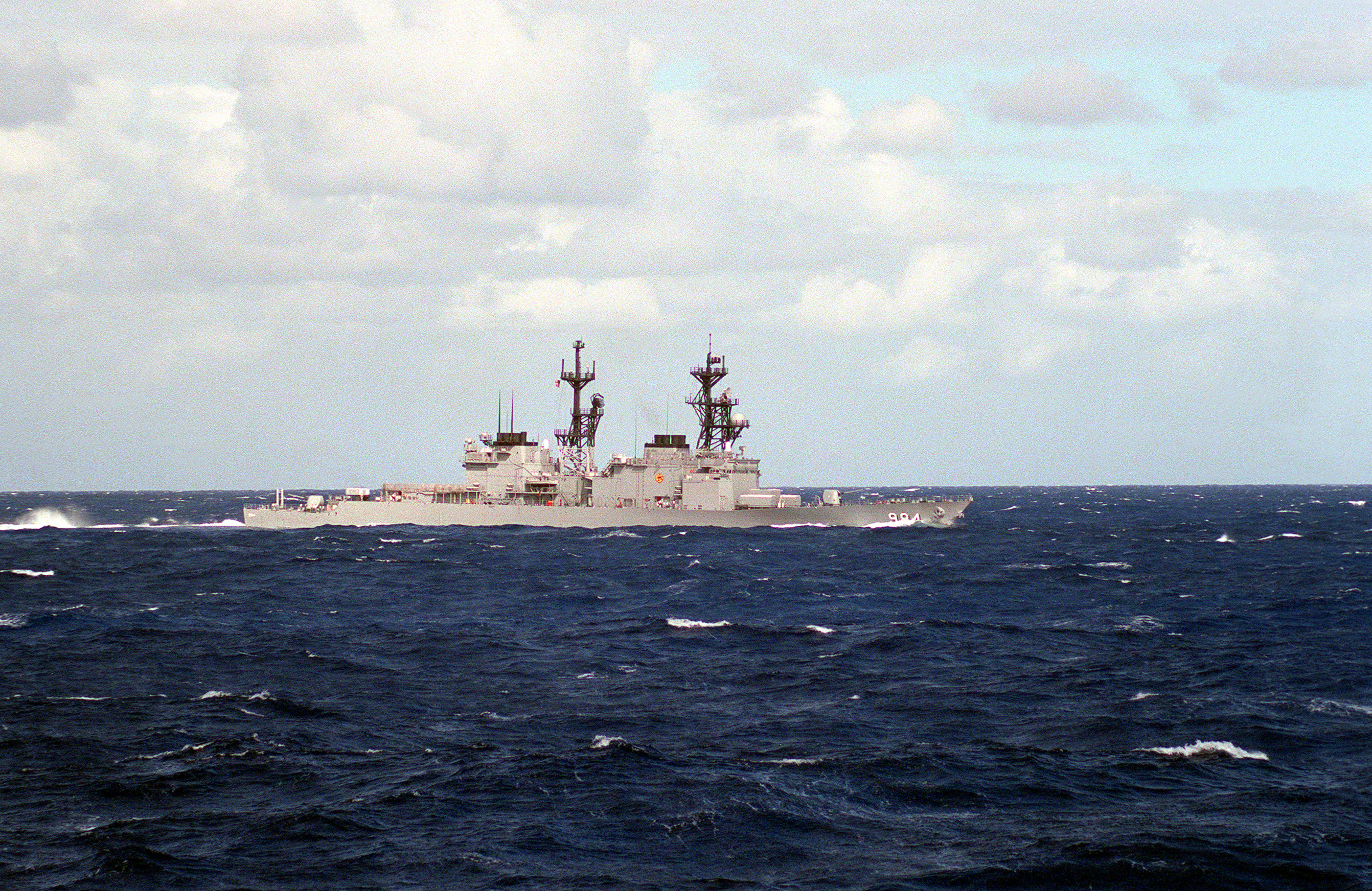
USS Leftwich on 1 April 1987

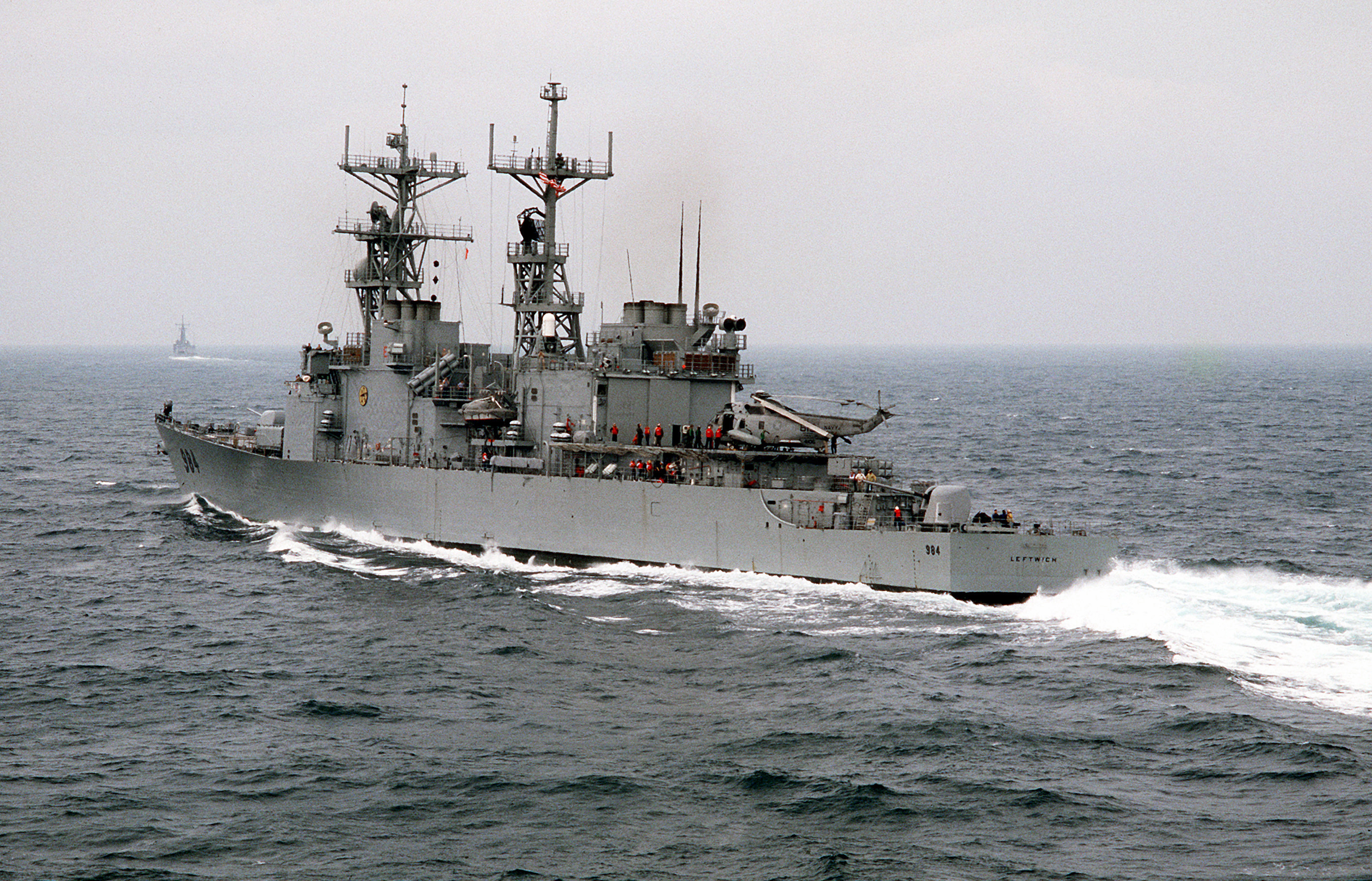
USS Leftwich in the Gulf of Oman on 1 October 1987

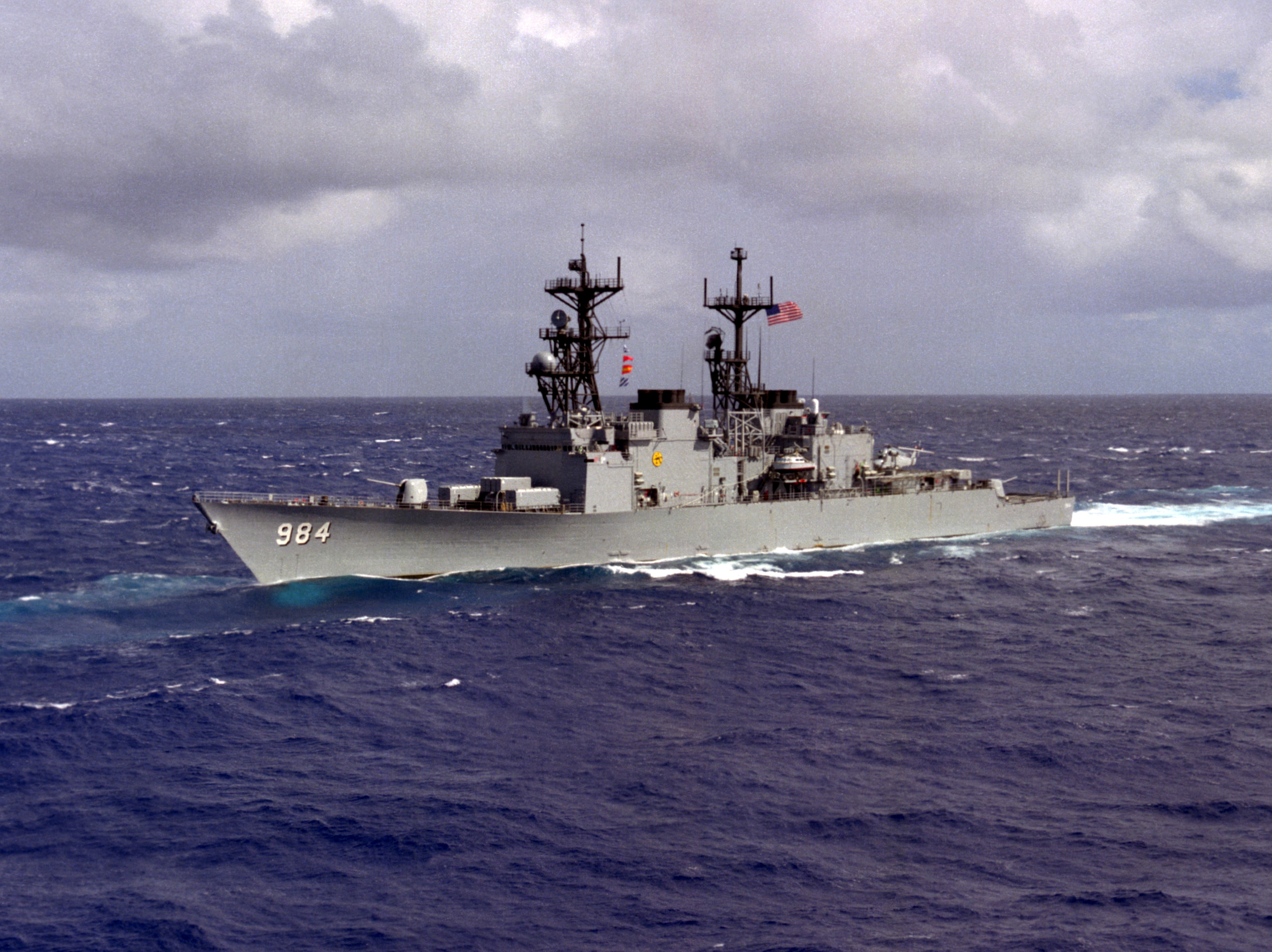
USS Leftwich in the Pacific Ocean on 16 December 1988
