= Petraeus scandal =

David Petraeus's resignation as CIA Director

The Petraeus scandal is a series of events that garnered strong media attention when an extramarital affair between retired four-star general and then-Director of the Central Intelligence Agency (CIA) David Petraeus and Paula Broadwell became public information. Petraeus had chosen Broadwell to be his official biographer. She co-authored his biography, All In: The Education of General David Petraeus, when Petraeus was the International Security Assistance Force (ISAF) commander. On 9 November 2012, she was reported to have been involved in the extramarital affair with Petraeus that triggered his resignation as Director of the CIA when it was discovered by the Federal Bureau of Investigation (FBI).

== Summary and chronology ==
The case was initiated by Federal Bureau of Investigation (FBI) agent Frederick W. Humphries II after he received a complaint about cyberstalking from Jill Kelley. Humphries reported it to his superiors and then to Republican congressional leaders Dave Reichert and Eric Cantor. He then reported it to FBI Director Robert Mueller after receiving complaints from Kelley that she was being stalked, on the grounds that the stalker "seem[ed] to know the comings and goings of a couple of generals". The FBI investigation uncovered an extramarital affair between Petraeus and Paula Broadwell, the latter being Kelley's cyberstalker. FBI agents also searched through emails that General John R. Allen exchanged with Jill Kelley.

An in-depth report in Time magazine provided a chronology of some of the major events and personalities as they unfolded:

- Broadwell, then a United States Army Reserve lieutenant colonel, first met Petraeus at Harvard University in 2006.
- Petraeus attained the rank of four-star general on 10 February 2007.
- Petraeus and Broadwell engaged in a secret extramarital affair—exactly when is not clear—after years of close contact as biographer (Broadwell) and subject (Petraeus).
- By the time Petraeus became Director of the Central Intelligence Agency in 2011, Broadwell had been working closely with him for years. She used nicknames for him such as "Dangerous Dave" and "Peaches".
- In May 2012, Jill Kelley filed a complaint with the FBI after receiving disturbing emails from a user identifying as "kelleypatrol". Kelley, her husband Scott, as well as her sister Natalie Khawam also happened to be friends of Petraeus and his wife Holly from the time Petraeus was stationed at CENTCOM in Tampa, Florida.
- Petraeus and Broadwell used fake names to create free webmail accounts exchanging messages without encryption tools. They would share an email account, with one saving a message in the drafts folder and the other deleting it after reading it.
- The FBI's investigation identified Paula Broadwell as the source of "kelleypatrol". The FBI used electronic metadata that pinpointed the times, places and IP addresses of "kelleypatrol."
- The FBI and intelligence agencies observed information regarding high-ranking U.S. military personnel, including Petraeus, and noted that some of the exchanges were "sexually charged".
- From the summer of 2012, FBI Director Robert Mueller and U.S. Attorney General Eric Holder decided to withhold information until after the U.S. presidential election on 6 November. It was two months before Mueller and Holder dispatched FBI Deputy Director Sean M. Joyce to notify the Director of National Intelligence James R. Clapper late on November 6 about the discovery of the affair.
- Agents had confronted Broadwell on 2 November 2012. The report did not reach headquarters until November 5. Mueller and Holder reviewed it on 6 November (Election Day); he decided that it was time to inform Clapper.
- Forensic techniques that discovered Broadwell's identity and the affair with Petraeus also uncovered almost 30,000 pages of messages between Kelley and General John R. Allen, the U.S. commander in Afghanistan. Allen denied an affair, but officials hinted that the emails raised "questions of impropriety". Allen's nomination as NATO's Supreme Allied Commander was put on hold.
- Media focused on the Kelley-Khawam families and found that Generals Petraeus and Allen had both intervened on behalf of Natalie Khawam (Wolfe), the twin sister of Jill (Khawam) Kelley, in a civilian child custody dispute by writing to the Superior Court of the District of Columbia.
- FBI agent Humphries, who was allegedly the one who had initially taken Kelley's case to the FBI's field office in Tampa, Florida, also had a personal friendship with Kelley. Humphries repeatedly intervened to advance the case, to which he was not assigned. In late October 2012 he phoned two US Representatives, Republicans Dave Reichert and Eric Cantor, and said that he believed the US Department of Justice was covering up the case. Humphries became the subject of an ethics probe by the Office of Professional Responsibility.
- On 7 November 2012, James R. Clapper, Director of National Intelligence, informed Thomas E. Donilon, the US National Security Advisor, about the Petraeus affair. The United States Department of Justice also informed the White House Counsel about General Allen's correspondence with Jill Kelley.
- On 8 November 2012, Petraeus tendered his resignation as CIA chief to President Obama, per directive from James Clapper.
- On 9 November 2012, Obama accepted Petraeus' resignation as Director of the CIA, after Petraeus admitted having a sexual relationship with his biographer.
- On 23 April 2015, Petraeus pleaded guilty to a misdemeanor charge of mishandling classified materials. He was given a two-year probationary period and a fine of $100,000.

== People involved ==
=== Major players ===
==== David Petraeus ====
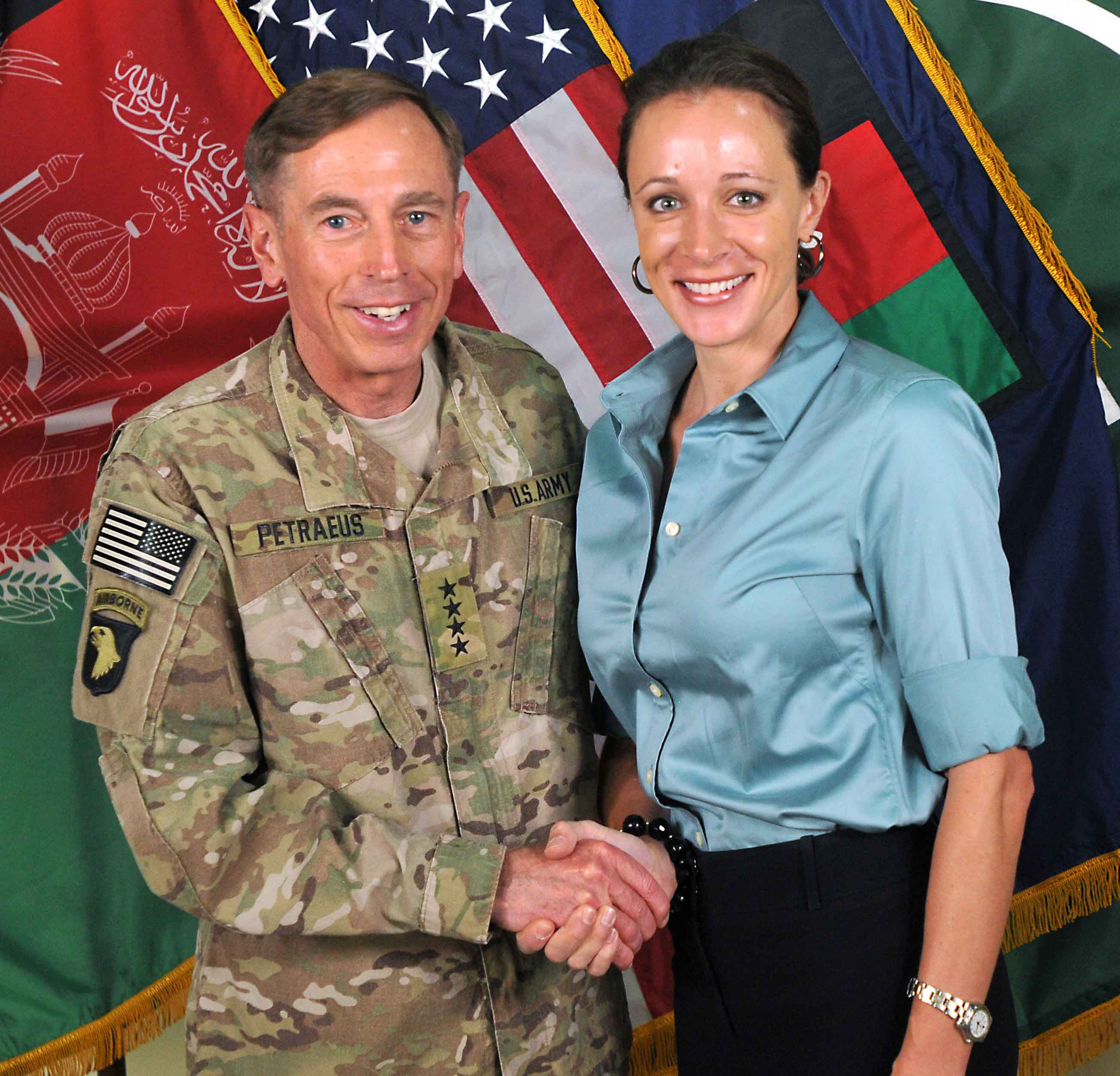
David Petraeus and Paula Broadwell on 13 July 2011

David Petraeus (born 7 November 1952) is an American former military officer and public official. He served as director of the Central Intelligence Agency from 6 September 2011, until his resignation on 9 November 2012. CIA Deputy Director Michael Morell replaced Director Petraeus in his duties, serving as Acting Director. Petraeus, prior to his assuming the directorship of the CIA, was a four-star general with over 37 years service in the United States Army.

Petraeus reportedly began an affair with Paula Broadwell, principal author of his biography, All In: The Education of General David Petraeus, after Petraeus left his ISAF command on 18 July 2011, to become CIA director. Petraeus reportedly ended the affair in the summer of 2012, around the time that he learned that Broadwell had been sending harassing emails to a longstanding family friend of the Petraeuses, Jill Kelley.

Kelley, a Lebanese American socialite in Tampa Bay, Florida, had approached an associate who worked for the FBI Tampa Field Office in the late spring about anonymous emails she considered threatening. The Bureau traced the emails to Broadwell and noted that Broadwell appeared to be exchanging intimate messages with an email account belonging to Petraeus, which instigated an investigation into whether that account had been hacked into or was someone posing as Petraeus.

In the wake of his resignation, Petraeus hired influential attorney Robert B. Barnett to represent him. Barnett has represented many influential people including President Barack Obama and has served as a practice debate opponent for many Democratic presidential and vice-presidential candidates.

==== Paula Broadwell ====
Paula Broadwell (born 9 November 1972) is a US Army Intelligence Officer, an American writer, academic, and anti-terrorism professional. She is the co-author with Vernon Loeb of The New York Times Best Seller, All In: The Education of General David Petraeus, a biography of then International Security Assistance Force commander David Petraeus. On November 9, 2012, she was reported to have been involved in the extramarital affair with Petraeus that triggered his resignation as Director of the CIA when it was discovered by the FBI because of her high level targets of cyber-stalking.

In or about May 2012, Jill Kelley, an Honorary Ambassador to MacDill Air Force Base in Tampa, Florida, began to receive anonymous emails which she considered to be threatening and harassing. She contacted the FBI, who traced the emails to Broadwell. The emails reportedly indicated that Broadwell suspected Kelley of starting an affair with General David Petraeus, who was a friend of Kelley's. Although the sending of the emails was deemed to be insufficient grounds for a criminal charge, the FBI called Broadwell in for questioning, at which time she admitted to the affair with Petraeus. After Broadwell turned over her computer, classified documents were found, which led to further FBI scrutiny of her relationship with Petraeus. Although Petraeus was not identified as the provider of the documents, the affair was revealed in early November 2012 and was cited by Petraeus as the reason for his resignation on November 9. On 14 November 2012, Broadwell was stripped of her clearances to access classified information, and her promotion to lieutenant colonel was revoked.

As an officer in the US Army Reserve, Broadwell has been suspended pending the outcome of the FBI investigation. She has cooperated with investigators in their effort to remove classified material in her possession. When the news of the scandal became public, Paula Broadwell spent time away from her husband and family secluded in Washington D.C. Her home in Charlotte, North Carolina, was searched by the FBI, all computers were removed, and some classified documents were found there. She returned home to be with her husband and children. The media has taken note of how Scott and Paula Broadwell have tried to get back to normal life.

Following the revelations about her relationship with Petraeus, Broadwell has retained the services of former Clinton Press Secretary Dee Dee Myers with the public relations firm The Glover Park Group. The founders of The Glover Park Group have previously served as officials in the Clinton White House and on the presidential campaign of former vice president Al Gore. The firm's services include public relations, advertising, marketing, government relations and policy counsel, crisis management and opinion research.

==== Jill Kelley ====
Jill Kelley (née Gilberte Khawam, 3 June 1975) the Ambassador to General Mattis and confidant to CIA Director Petraeus, who frequently entertained senior officers from nearby MacDill Air Force Base at her Tampa home. Kelley's family is Lebanese-American Maronite Catholic. Kelley's friendships with four star Generals David Petraeus and John R. Allen led to her becoming a key figure in the government investigations into the communications of the two men.

In May 2012, Kelley contacted a local FBI investigator whom she knew, Frederick W. Humphries II, to complain about being cyberstalked. This set off a chain of events that eventually led to Petraeus's resignation on November 9, 2012. The anonymous emailer was identified as Paula Broadwell, who investigators discovered had been having an affair with Petraeus.

On 13 November 2012, defense secretary Leon Panetta said that General Allen's nomination for the post of Supreme Allied Commander Europe would be delayed while the investigation into Allen's extensive communications with Kelley was underway, though both Secretary Panetta and Obama expressed their confidence in General Allen's ability to lead in his current post and noted that he has not been formally censured.

During the investigations, Kelley was represented by defense lawyer Abbe D. Lowell and crisis management expert Judy Smith. Lowell was Chief Minority Counsel to the Democrats in the House of Representatives during the unsuccessful opposition of the impeachment of Bill Clinton in the Lewinsky scandal. Smith is founder, president and CEO of Smith and Company.

==== Natalie Khawam ====
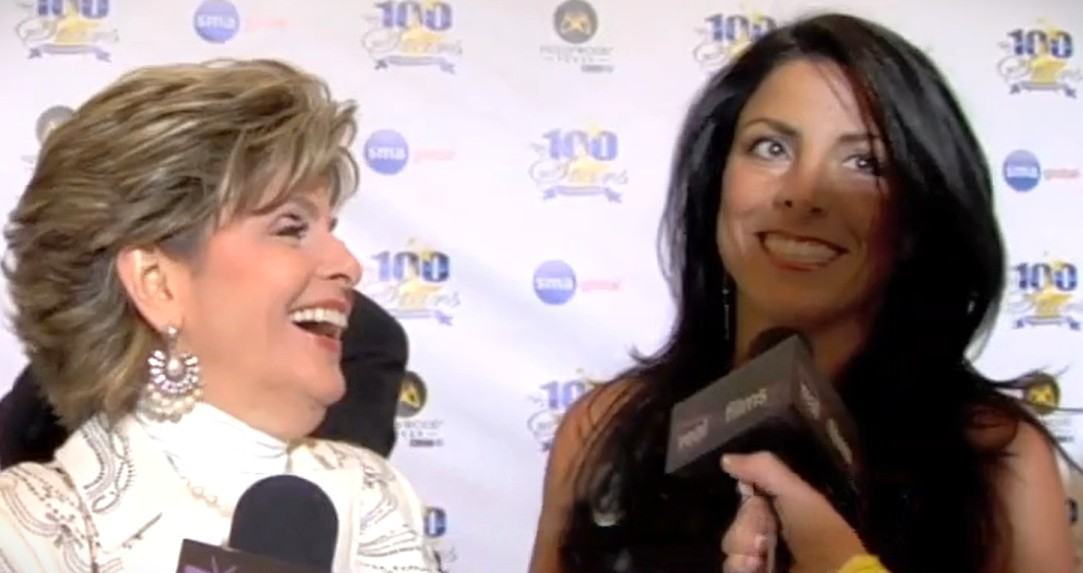
Natalie Khawam (right), with her attorney, Gloria Allred, in 2013

Natalie Khawam (born June 3, 1975) is an attorney in Florida. Khawam holds a Juris Doctor from Georgetown University Law Center in Washington, DC. She is also the identical twin sister of Jill Kelley. She was reportedly also friends with both General David Petraeus and General John R. Allen. Khawam was born in Beirut, Lebanon.

According to White House sources, both Kelley and Khawam visited the White House three times from September to November 2012. The visits occurred after the FBI had begun investigating allegedly threatening and jealous emails Kelley said she received over her friendship with then-CIA Director Petraeus. Khawam had a relationship with Gerald Harrington, the vice chair of finance for John Kerry's 2004 presidential campaign. Harrington is a fundraiser for the Democratic Senatorial Campaign Committee (DSCC), the Democratic Congressional Campaign Committee (DCCC) and the Democratic National Committee (DNC), and it was Harrington that gave Khawam access to events hosted by Senator John Kerry, Senator Sheldon Whitehouse and Representative Patrick J. Kennedy.

==== John R. Allen ====
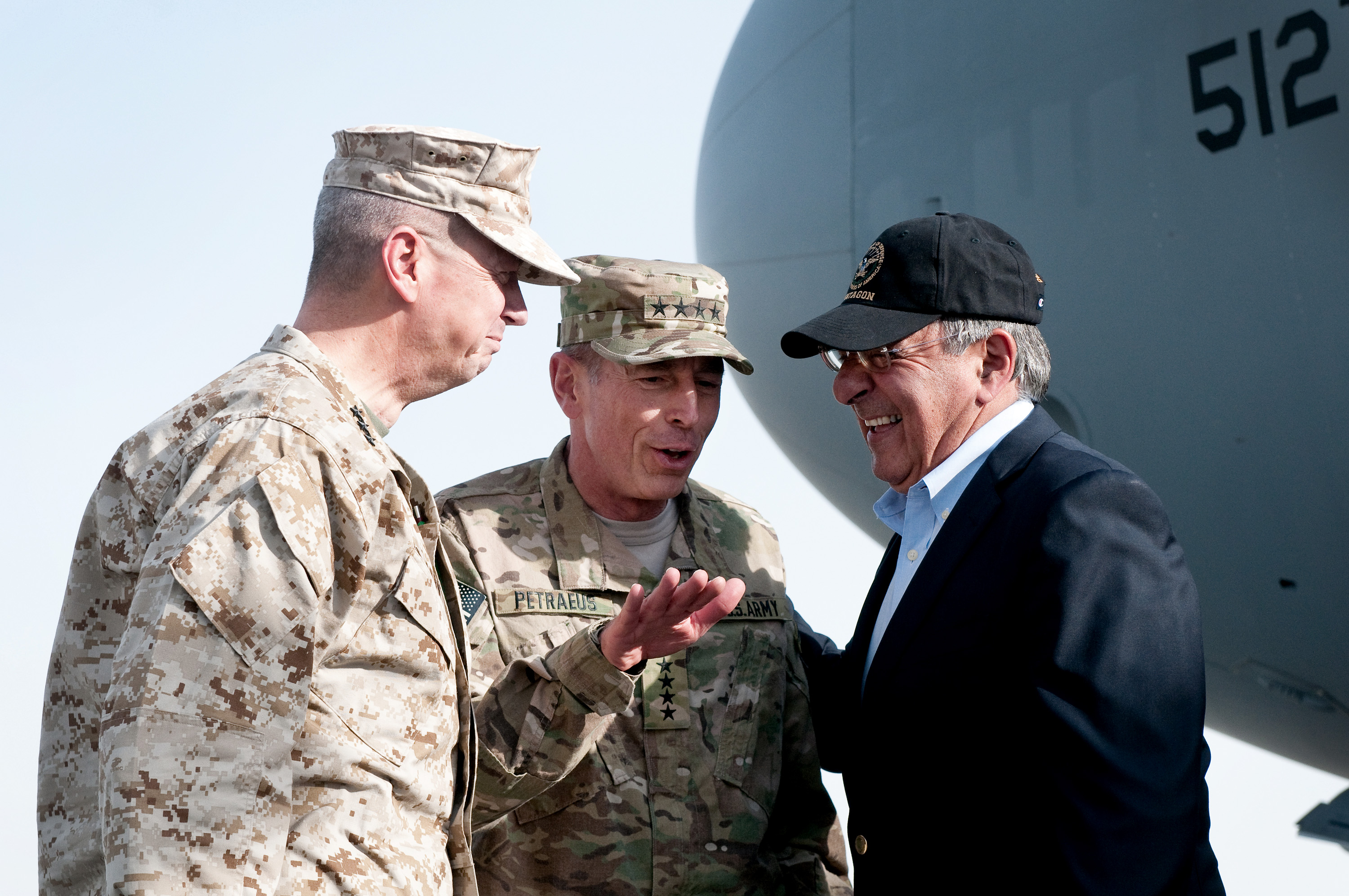
Allen (left) and Petraeus (center) greet Secretary Panetta, July 2011

John R. Allen (born December 15, 1953) is a United States Marine Corps four-star general. On July 18, 2011, Allen assumed command of International Security Assistance Force (ISAF) as Commander, U.S. Forces Afghanistan (USFOR-A), succeeding Army General David Petraeus. He has been appointed NATO's Supreme Allied Commander, Europe, to take office in early 2013, pending confirmation by the United States Senate. On November 13, 2012, Defense Secretary Leon Panetta said that Allen's nomination for SACEUR would be "delayed". News agencies reported that Allen's communications with Jill Kelley, a Tampa woman who was friends with Allen's predecessor as top commander in Afghanistan, David Petraeus, were under investigation. Petraeus had resigned as Director of the Central Intelligence Agency four days earlier.

In November 2012, Allen became embroiled in an inappropriate communication investigation concerning his correspondences with Jill Kelley. According to the FBI, Allen had received anonymous e-mail messages, sent by someone identified as "kelleypatrol" (later found to be Paula Broadwell) advising him to stay away from Jill Kelley. Allen forwarded it to Kelley and they discussed a concern that someone was cyberstalking them.

In response to the investigation, Secretary Panetta moved to speed the nomination of General Joseph Dunford to command of forces in Afghanistan.

As a result of his name emerging as part of the scandal, Allen is reported as being represented by military spokesmen as well as military defense lawyers from the chief defense counsel of the Marine Corps. The United States Marine Corps Judge Advocate Division is the United States Marine Corps's legal arm, and is subordinate to the Judge Advocate General of the Navy. The head of the Division is the Staff Judge Advocate (SJA) to the Commandant of the Marine Corps (CMC). Military attorneys (or judge advocates) in the Marine Corps work under the supervision of the SJA to the CMC to advise Marine commanders regarding legal issues. Colonel John G. Baker, the chief defense counsel of the Marine Corps has been speaking for Allen.

On January 22, 2013, General Allen was cleared in a misconduct inquiry.

==== Frederick W. Humphries II ====
Frederick Ward Humphries II (born 1965), the FBI agent who started the investigation, was a friend of Jill Kelley.

Humphries had pursued Kelley's cyberstalking complaint after he had reported it, even though he was not assigned to the case. He was admonished by supervisors who thought he was trying to improperly insert himself into the investigation when in late October 2012, fearing that the case was being stalled, he contacted Representative Dave Reichert, a Republican from Washington State, where Humphries had once been stationed, to inform him of the case. Reichert put him in touch with the House majority leader, Eric Cantor, who passed the message to FBI Director Robert Mueller.

Humphries was later barred from taking part in the investigation over concerns that he had become "obsessed" with the case. Officials discovered that he had once sent a shirtless photo of himself posing with dummies at a shooting range to Kelley, although Humphries later told The Seattle Times that dozens of other friends and acquaintances had also received the photo in a "joking" email sent in the fall of 2010, soon after Humphries had transferred to Tampa from Guantánamo Bay.

In November 2012 Humphries remained under investigation by the Office of Professional Responsibility, the internal-affairs arm of the United States Department of Justice.

Humphries, a University of Tampa graduate, has had a notable FBI career. In December 1999, his familiarity with the French language allowed him to recognize the Algerian accented French of Ahmed Ressam. Skeptical of Ressam's claim to be French Canadian, Humphries had Ressam detained. The Algerian-born Ressam was later found guilty of conspiring to attack Los Angeles International Airport. The trial judge in the Ressam case, John C. Coughenour, praised Humphries' work and integrity. In May 2010 Humphries killed a retired Army Ranger at the MacDill Air Force Base main gate after the retiree brandished a knife and was said to have threatened the lives of base security officials and Humphries. The fatal shooting was later deemed to be justified.

Humphries was represented by Lawrence Berger, the general counsel for the Federal Law Enforcement Officers Association. Berger has stated that: "Humphries only received the information from Ms. Kelley and never played a role in the investigation...Humphries and his wife had been 'social friends with Ms. Kelley and her husband prior to the day she referred the matter to him.' 'They always socialized and corresponded,'...That picture was sent years before Ms. Kelley contacted him about this."

=== Minor players ===
==== Holly Petraeus ====
Holly Petraeus is married to David Petraeus. She is the assistant director of service-member affairs at the Consumer Financial Protection Bureau.

==== Scott Broadwell ====
Dr. Scott Broadwell was the husband of Paula Broadwell. He is a radiologist in Charlotte, North Carolina. Scott Broadwell and his future wife Paula Kranz met in 2000 when they were both active duty US Army captains. He was then a physician and commander of the Mannheim military clinic in Germany. Paula Kranz was in military intelligence. They were married in Heidelberg Castle with Lt. Col. Ronald Leininger, a Protestant Army chaplain officiating.

==== Scott Kelley ====
Dr. Scott Kelley is the husband of Jill Kelley. He is an oncology surgeon in Tampa, Florida. Scott and Jill Kelley hosted social events attended by David and Holly Petraeus, becoming their friends.

== Reactions ==
=== The White House and Barack Obama ===
After being briefed on 8 November, Obama summoned Petraeus to the White House, where Petraeus offered his resignation. After taking some time to consider, Obama chose not to suspend Petraeus but accepted the resignation on 9 November. Petraeus cited the affair when announcing that same day that he would be resigning as CIA Director.

In the days following Obama's re-election in November 2012, he had to face the ramifications of the Petraeus scandal. Media reported that angry congressional leaders were demanding answers about the Petraeus affair and "why they were given zero advance notice of the spymaster’s lively love life". An article in TIME probed "The Petraeus Affair: Why Was Obama Kept in the Dark?"

=== CIA and intelligence community ===
Although US Attorney General Eric Holder was aware early on that the FBI had discovered an affair, it was not until 6 November 2012, that Petraeus' nominal superior, Director of National Intelligence James R. Clapper, was advised. The same evening that Clapper was informed, Clapper called Petraeus and urged him to resign. Clapper notified the White House the next day, 7 November.

=== FBI and law enforcement ===
Officials say the FBI knew of Petraeus' affair in the summer of 2012. According to an Associated Press report, rather than sending emails to each other's inbox which would have left a more obvious email trail, messages were left in a draft folder which were then read when the other person logged into the same account.

=== Congressional involvement ===
Although the Tampa FBI agent familiar with Kelley, Fred Humphries, was not put on the case as he was not part of the cybersquad, the agent was said to have become obsessed with the investigation. After being instructed by his superiors to steer clear of the case, Humphries reportedly became convinced that the investigation had been stalled because of a politically motivated desire to protect Obama. The agent then contacted Republican Congressman Dave Reichert, and was able to relay information to House Majority Leader Eric Cantor. Cantor's office raised the matter with FBI Director Robert Mueller on 31 October.

After news of the affair between Petraeus and Broadwell broke, several members of Congress stated that they felt they should have been informed about the FBI investigation earlier.

=== U.S. military ===
On 13 November, it emerged that Kelley had a connection to General John R. Allen, Petraeus' successor as top commander in Afghanistan. Defense Secretary Panetta, Petraeus' predecessor at the CIA, said that Allen's nomination for Supreme Allied Commander Europe would be "delayed". News agencies reported that Allen's communications with Kelley were under investigation.

=== Former colleagues and acquaintances ===
James Marks, a retired General and CNN military analyst thinks the scandal is mainly a personal tragedy for the involved parties. Broadwell worked for Marks and therefore, unlike many others, Marks was not surprised that Broadwell was able to gain access to Petraeus' inner circle. Petraeus had tested Broadwell by going on a long run, a test Broadwell was able to pass, eventually leading Petraeus to let his guard down. On a security level, Marks saw no significant problems. As to the motives for Petraeus to get involved in the relationship, Marks feels that the departure from the military may have played a role.

Peter Mansoor, retired colonel, executive officer and friend to Petraeus, in an interview discussed his view and Petraeus' reaction to the scandal. Mansoor recalled that during their first meeting Broadwell struck him as confident, physically fit, and ambitious. However, he was also surprised that Petraeus let Broadwell into his inner circle despite existing rules of no embeds and personality profiling. He later said that Petraeus told him that he "screwed up big time". Mansoor speculates that Petraeus may have stayed at the CIA had the scandal not come out.

Jack Keane, a former general who supported Petraeus during his takeover as commander of the allied forces in Iraq, expressed sadness over the situation. He felt that the accomplishments of Petraeus would be forgotten.

== List of key U.S. officials dealing with the scandal ==
- FBI Special Agent Frederick Humphries II
- FBI Director Robert Mueller
- Attorney General Eric Holder
- FBI Deputy Director Sean M. Joyce
- Director of National Intelligence James R. Clapper
- Representative Dave Reichert
- Former Representative Eric Cantor
- National Security Advisor Thomas E. Donilon
- Secretary of Defense Leon Panetta
- U.S. President Barack Obama

== List of defense teams ==
- Robert B. Barnett representing David Petraeus.
- Dee Dee Myers and The Glover Park Group representing Paula Broadwell.
- Abbe D. Lowell representing Jill Kelley.
- Gloria Allred representing Natalie Khawam.
- John G. Baker, chief defense counsel of the Marine Corps and the Defense counsel of the Marine Corps representing John R. Allen.
- Lawrence Berger, general counsel for the Federal Law Enforcement Officers Association representing Frederick Humphries II.

== See also ==
- Cyberstalking
- Lewinsky scandal
- List of federal political scandals in the United States
- Political scandal
- Sex scandal
