= Aram Bartholl =

German visual artist

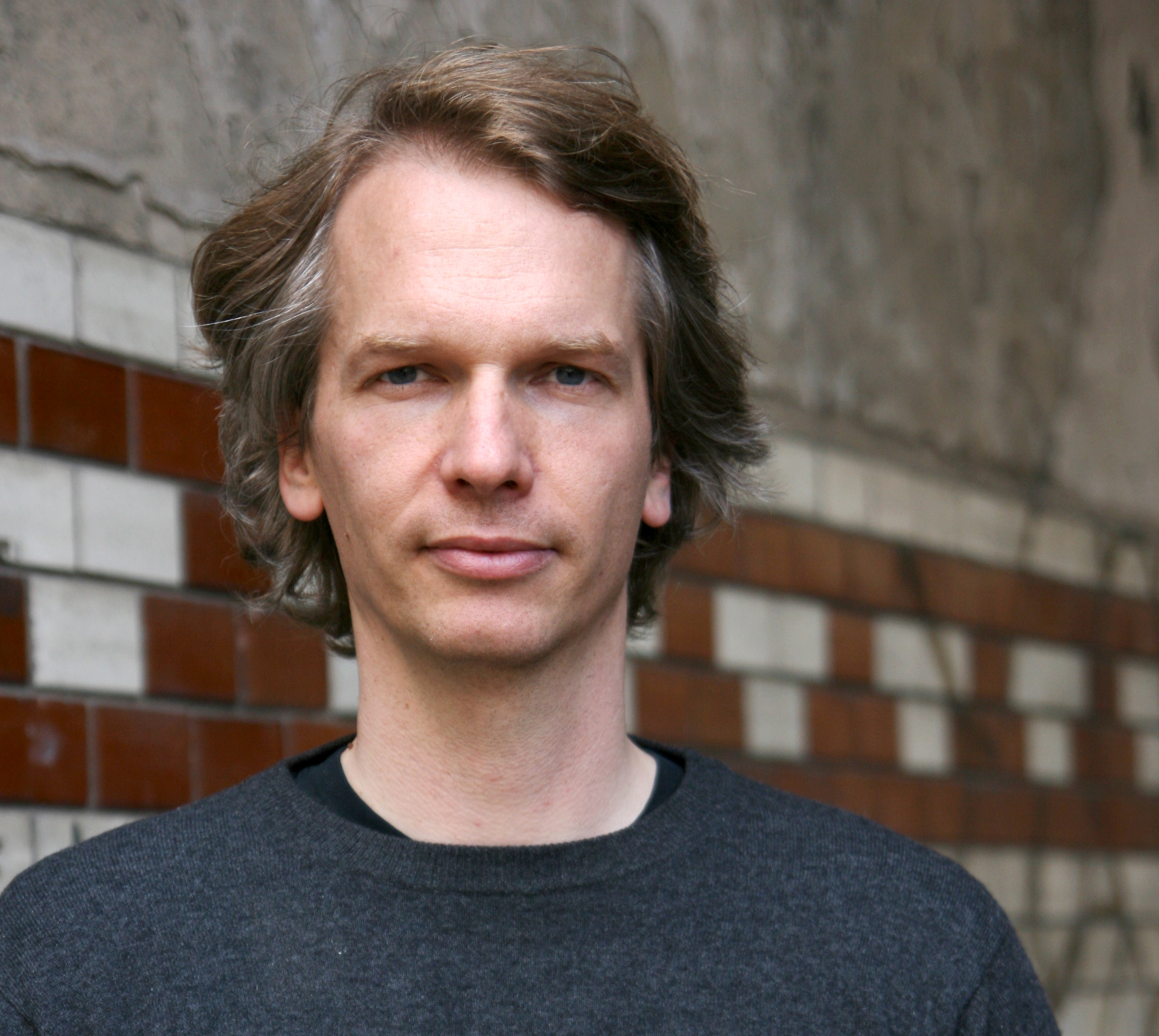
- Bartholl in 2011
- Born: Aram Bartholl; 27 December 1972 (age 53); Bremen, West Germany
- Education: Berlin University of the Arts
- Known for: contemporary art, digital art, conceptual art

Aram Bartholl (born December 27, 1972, in Bremen, West Germany) is a Berlin-based conceptual artist known for his examination of the relationship between the digital and physical world. His works often deal with anonymity and privacy. Aram Bartholl is currently Professor for art with digital media at HAW Hamburg.

== Early life and education ==
Aram Bartholl graduated from Berlin University of the Arts in 2001 with an engineer's degree in architecture. His graduate thesis "Bits on Location" won the 2001 Browserday competition. During Bartholl's studies, he held a nine-month internship position at the Rotterdam-based architecture office MVRDV. From 1996 to 2000, Bartholl was part of the artist group "Freies Fach" which was known for its discourse on urban matters and for its public interventions. He was also a member of the Internet-based Free Art and Technology Lab a.k.a. F.A.T. Lab founded by Evan Roth and James Powderly from 2009 until its discontinuation in 2015.

== Work ==
Aram Bartholl is variously identified as a media artist, a conceptual artist, a post-digital artist, and an interdisciplinary artist. Bartholl's work has been associated with that of Constant Dullaart and Evan Roth among others. He meticulously examines the implications of digital media and the changes in environment and circumstance that have resulted; he attained global recognition for his seminal work, Map (2006), an installation in public space that bridges the real and virtual worlds. In Bartholl's play on video game adaptations, he also connects the virtual and real world in new ways.

Bartholl has also explored new curatorial formats to represent digital art. In SPEED SHOW gallery-like openings are created for browser-based artworks in public internet cafes. In 2014, Bartholl curated Full Screen an exhibition of digital art presented on a variety of screens, including wearables, featuring works by artists including Ai Weiwei, Constant Dullaart, Rafaël Rozendaal and Evan Roth.

As visiting professor at Kassel Art School (Kunsthochschule Kassel, Bartholl has taught Visual Communication/New Media since 2015. He was also visiting professor in Design Media Arts at UCLA, Los Angeles in the Winter/Spring quarter 2016.

== Notable works ==
=== Keepalive ===
Keepalive is a permanent outdoor sculpture in Niedersachsen, Germany, commissioned by the Center for Digital Cultures, Leuphana University Lüneburg. The title, Keepalive, refers to the keepalive signal, a message – often sent at predetermined intervals – that is used on networks to check the link between two devices, to make a diagnosis or to indicate to the internet infrastructure that the connection should be preserved. Domenico Quaranta described the work as generating, "...a fiction that ironically locates it in a post-apocalyptic, cyberpunk scenario where humanity has been “kept alive”, the internet is over and power is provided by fire, but also where technologies and pieces of information have survived as digital junk. Presented as an artwork and preserved as such, it may once turn useful and even essential for a wandering Mad Max to survive, as the only remaining access point to basic information."

=== Dead Drops ===
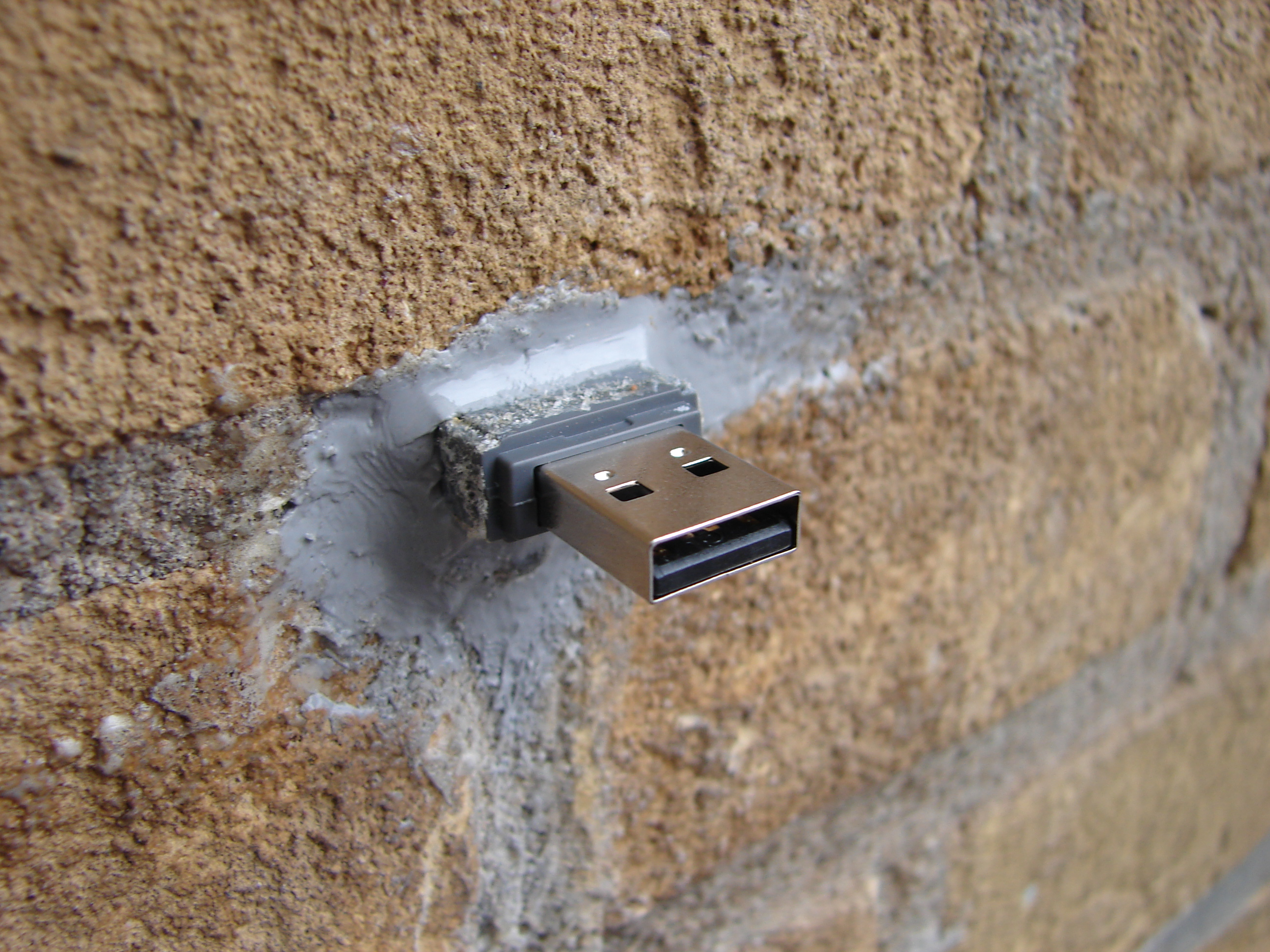
Dead Drops

Bartholl's ongoing Dead Drops project, started in 2010, set up an offline peer-to-peer file-sharing network at five public locations in New York using dead drops: USB sticks cemented into walls. The project has expanded exponentially around the world—over 1,400 of them have been placed in dozens of countries, including South Africa, Ghana, Germany, Iran and Russia.

The Dead Drops concept was extended in 2013 with the DVD Dead Drop installation at the Museum of the Moving Image (New York City). Bartholl embedded an inconspicuous, slot-loading DVD burner into the side of the Museum, available to the public 24 hours a day. Visitors who found the Dead Drop and inserted a blank DVD-R received a digital art exhibition, a collection of media, or other featured content curated by Bartholl or selected artists.

In 2011, Dead Drops was included in the "Talk to Me" show at the Museum of Modern Art in New York.

=== Map ===
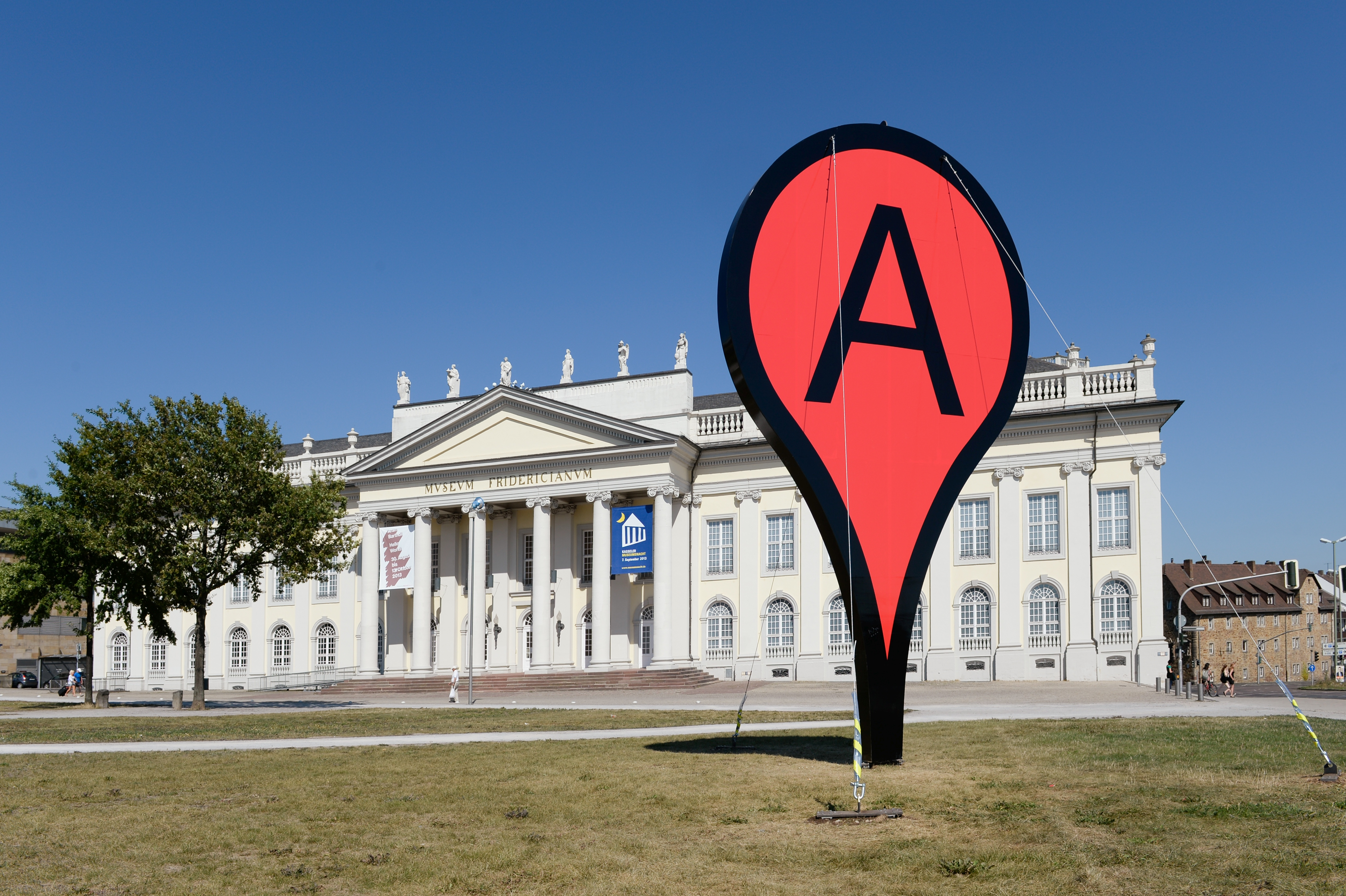
Map by Aram Bartholl at the show Hello World, Kasseler Kunstverein2013

In 2006, Bartholl created a public art installation called Map. Bartholl installs a large physical representation of the Google Maps pin in the exact location that Google Maps identifies as the centre of a city. Locations thus far have included Taipei, Berlin, Arles, Tallinn and Kassel. Each sculpture remains in place for about three months, usually coinciding with a local art festival or exhibit.

The series was designed to raise viewers' awareness of the increasing overlap between the virtual and the physical, and to highlight mapping services' influence on perceptions of location. Bartholl's physical representations of the Google Maps pin urges viewers to reevaluate the information given by digitized maps, the meaning of the “center” of a city, the politicization of boundaries, and other issues related to maps and the digital versus the physical world.

== Exhibitions ==
Bartholl's work has been shown internationally in solo and group exhibitions.

He is one of the artists selected for the 5th Skulptur Projekte Münster in 2017, a once every ten years exhibition curated by Kasper König that has previously featured artists such as Naim Jun Paik, Mike Kelly, Rachael Whiteread, Mark Wallinger and Rosemarie Trockel.

Aram Bartholl's 2016 solo show at Kunstverein Arnsberg, #remindmelater, featured the public performance Greenscreen Arnsberg, which "caught" passers by with a portable green screen.

Solo Shows:

- 2016 Remind me later - Kunstverein Arnsberg, Arnsberg
- 2015 Point Of View - Babycastles Gallery, New York City, NY
- 2014 Hurt me plenty - DAM GALLERY Berlin, Berlin
- 2013 Hello World! - Kasseler Kunstverein, Kassel
- 2012 Reply All, DAM Berlin, Germany

== Awards ==
In 2007 Bartholl received an honorable mention from transmediale for the piece "Random Screen" and with the concept for the performance piece "Sociial" he won the 17th Video Art Award Bremen 2007. In 2011, Dead Drops received an Honorable Mention at Ars Electronica.
