= Dee Dee Myers =

American political analyst and press secretary

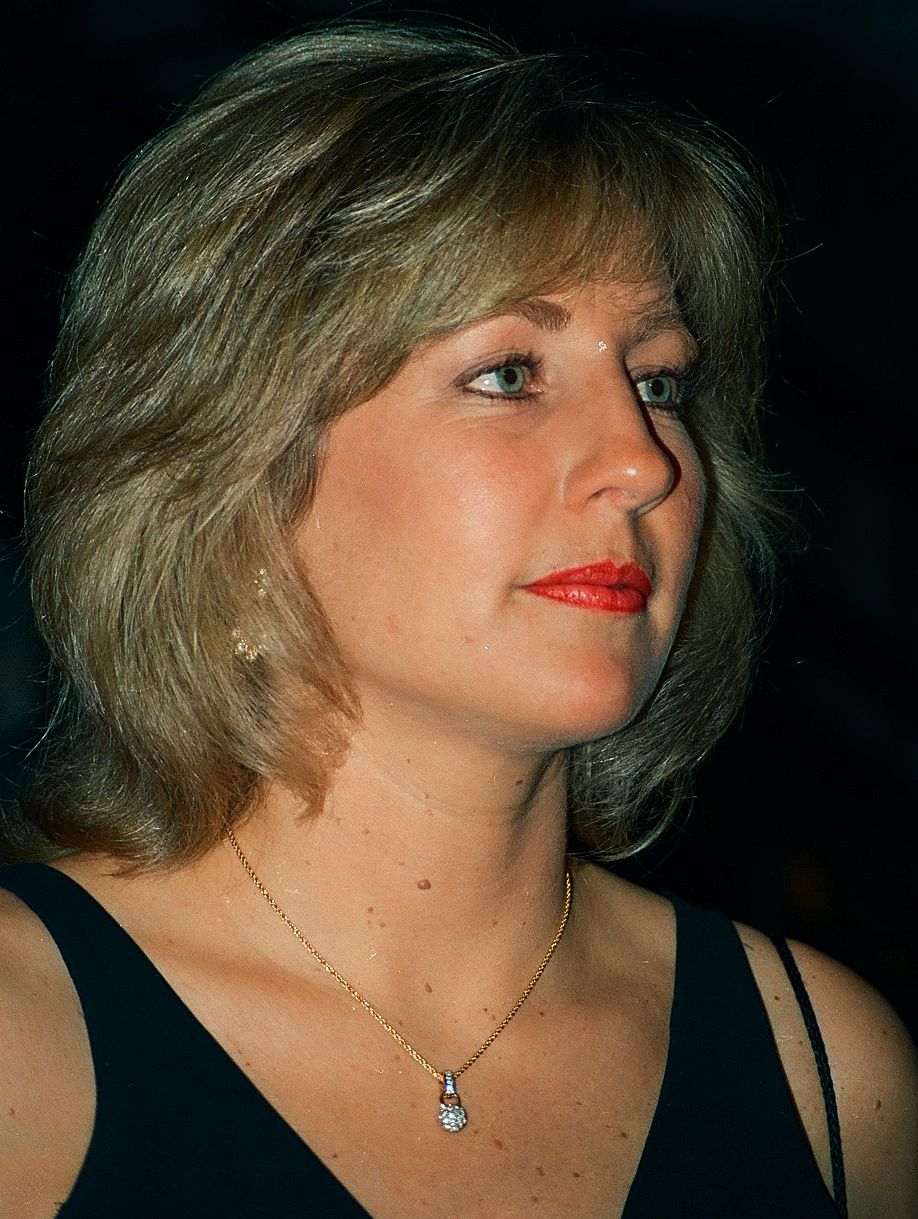
- Myers in 1996

19th White House Press Secretary
- In office January 20, 1993 – December 22, 1994
- President: Bill Clinton
- Preceded by: Marlin Fitzwater
- Succeeded by: Mike McCurry

Personal details
- Born: Margaret Jane Myers; September 1, 1961 (age 65) North Kingstown, Rhode Island, U.S.
- Party: Democratic
- Spouse: Todd S. Purdum (m. 1997)
- Children: 2
- Education: Santa Clara University (BA)

Margaret Jane "Dee Dee" Myers (born September 1, 1961) is an American political analyst who served as the 19th White House press secretary during the first two years of the Clinton administration. She was the first woman and, at the time, the second-youngest person to hold that position. Myers later co-hosted the news program Equal Time on CNBC, and was a consultant on The West Wing. She was the inspiration for fictional White House Press Secretary C. J. Cregg. She is also the author of the 2008 New York Times best-selling book, Why Women Should Rule the World. In 2020, she joined California Governor Gavin Newsom’s administration as Senior Advisor to the Governor and Director of the Governor's Office of Business and Economic Development.

== Personal life ==
Margaret Jane Myers was born in 1961 at Quonset Point in North Kingstown, Rhode Island, to Stephen and Judy Myers. Her nickname, "Dee Dee", originated when her sister could not pronounce "baby."

Myers spent most of her formative years in Valencia, Santa Clarita, California. Her father was a Navy aviator who completed two tours of duty in the Vietnam War, and her mother worked as a real estate agent.

Myers is a graduate of William S. Hart High School and Santa Clara University (1983).

Myers met her husband, Todd Purdum, the national editor for Vanity Fair, former White House correspondent, and Los Angeles bureau chief for The New York Times, during the 1992 presidential campaign. The couple, who married in 1997, have two children, Kate and Stephen, and live in Los Angeles, California.

== Political career ==
Myers' career in political communications began shortly after graduating from college, taking a full-time role on the 1984 presidential campaign of Walter Mondale. She later served as a field representative for California State Senator Art Torres, and as assistant press secretary in the office of Los Angeles Mayor Tom Bradley and on his 1986 campaign for California governor. She was also a spokesperson for Michael Dukakis' 1988 presidential bid and Dianne Feinstein's 1990 California gubernatorial campaign, and served as campaign manager for Frank Jordan's 1991 run for San Francisco mayor.

=== Clinton years ===
Myers joined Bill Clinton's presidential campaign team in 1991 and, following the 1992 presidential election, was named Clinton's first White House Press Secretary, a role she held from January 20, 1993, to December 22, 1994. She was the first woman to serve in that position and was the second-youngest, behind Ron Ziegler, when she took the job at the age of 31. Myers is now the third-youngest, as Karoline Leavitt, Donald Trump's press secretary, was 27 when she assumed the role in January 2025.

According to the Detroit Free Press, Myers earned a reputation for her "humor and patience" in handling the White House press corps, often delivering "quick one-liners" while issuing daily press briefings. Until September 1994, when she was given the title of Assistant to the President, she held the lesser title of "deputy assistant" and had a lower salary than previous White House Press Secretaries. She also lacked consistent access to Clinton's inner circle. This was frequently noted in news coverage about Myers throughout her term, and is addressed in her 2008 book, Why Women Should Rule The World.

== Post-White House career ==
After the Clinton administration, she became a political analyst and commentator, appearing on television and speaking at events on politics and the media.

=== Television and popular culture ===
In May 1995, Myers became the co-host of political talk show Equal Time on CNBC. She initially hosted the show opposite Mary Matalin, and later opposite Bay Buchanan. In 1997, she was the winning contestant on an episode of Celebrity Jeopardy!, beating Robert F. Kennedy, Jr. and Representative Jesse Jackson, Jr. Myers has also appeared as a guest on other television programs, including The Today Show, Charlie Rose, and ABC's Nightline. She also appeared as herself in the 1997 Robert Zemeckis film, Contact.

Writer Aaron Sorkin recruited Myers to serve as a consultant and script advisor on the Emmy Award-winning TV series The West Wing, beginning in 1999. The character of C. J. Cregg (played by Allison Janney), the White House Press Secretary on the series, was partially inspired by Myers. News articles have also reported that she may have served as the basis for the character of Daisy Green in the novel and film Primary Colors, played by Maura Tierney.

=== Commentator ===
Myers has contributed to Vanity Fair since July 1995, originally as a Washington editor, and since 1997 as a contributing editor. She is the author of the 2008 New York Times best-selling book Why Women Should Rule The World, about women taking on positions of leadership and her own experiences in the White House. Her writings have also appeared in a number of other publications, including the Los Angeles Times, The New York Times, Time, The Washington Post, O: the Oprah Magazine, Politico, and The Huffington Post. Since leaving the White House, Myers has also been invited to speak at numerous events, usually on the topics of women's issues, the media and politics. In 2011, she became a brand ambassador for Jones New York's Empower your Confidence campaign, and appeared as a model in advertisements for the brand.

=== Public affairs consulting ===
Myers joined The Glover Park Group in September 2010, as a managing director of public affairs. Her role at the firm involves consulting with clients on communications strategy, marketing and reputation management. In January 2013 she was the spokeswoman for Paula Broadwell during the Petraeus scandal.

=== Corporate communications ===
In September 2014, Myers became the head of corporate communications at Warner Bros. She departed from this position in February 2020.

=== State government ===
In December 2020, California Governor Gavin Newsom appointed Myers as Senior Advisor and Director of the Governor's Office of Business and Economic Development (GO-Biz).

Political offices
Preceded by Marlin Fitzwater	White House Press Secretary; 1993–1994	Succeeded by Mike McCurry
