= Dead drop =

Method of espionage tradecraft

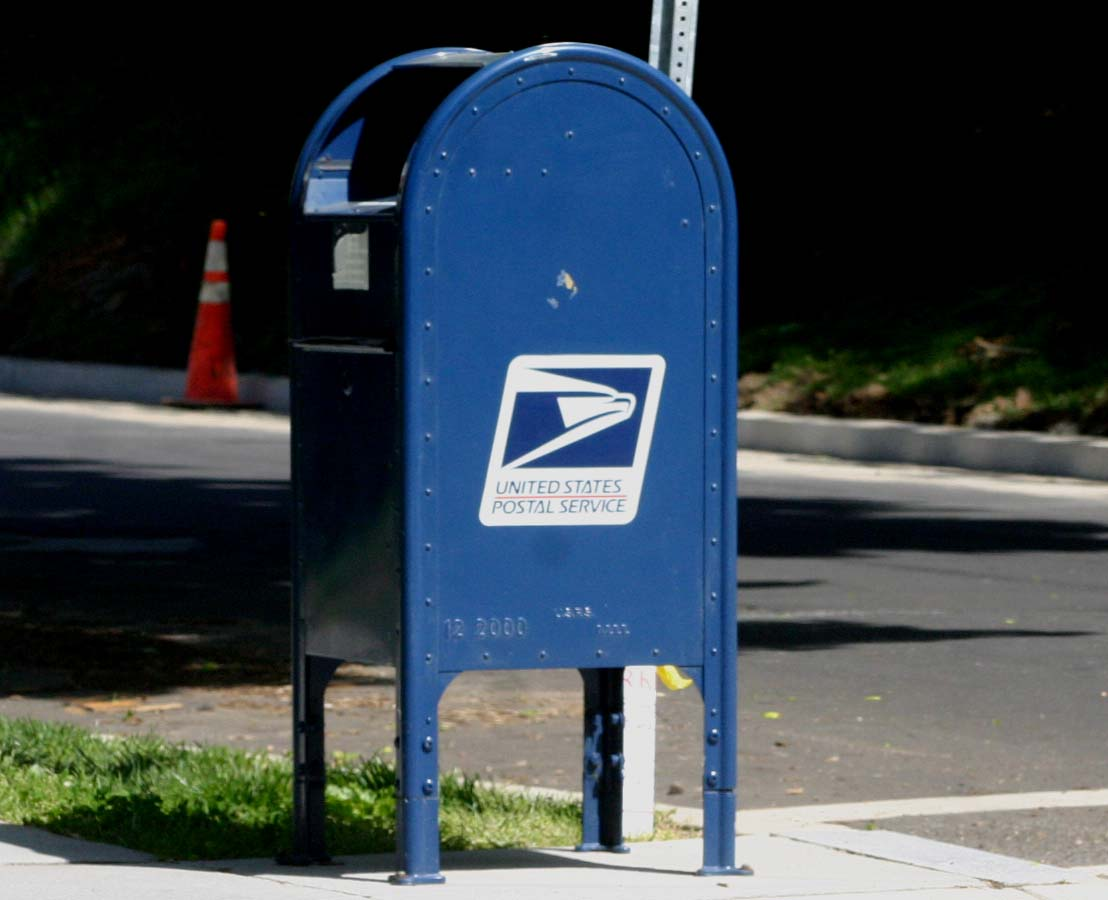
This (replacement) mailbox is identical to, and in the same location of, one that convicted spy Aldrich Ames used to signal his Russian counterparts. Ames would place a horizontal chalk mark about 3 in (7.6 cm) long above the USPS logo.

A dead drop or dead letter box is a method of espionage tradecraft used to pass items or information between two individuals (e.g., a case officer and an agent, or two agents) via a secret location. By avoiding direct meetings, individuals can maintain operational security. This method stands in contrast to the live drop, which involves a face-to-face exchange.

Spies and their handlers have been known to perform dead drops using various techniques to hide items (such as money, information, or instructions) and to signal that the drop has been made. Although the signal and location by necessity must be agreed upon in advance, the signal may or may not be located close to the dead drop itself. The operatives may not necessarily know or meet each other.

Dead drops are sometimes used for the sale of narcotics. This method of illegal drug distribution has seen a rise in popularity on Darknet drug markets (DNMs) which offer escrow services, facilitating trust between buyers and sellers. This method of distribution first became popular on Russian DNMs.

== Methods ==
The success of a dead drop depends on the location and method of concealment, ensuring retrieval without the operatives being spotted by the public, law enforcement, or other security forces. Common everyday items and behaviors are used to avoid suspicion. Any hidden location is used.

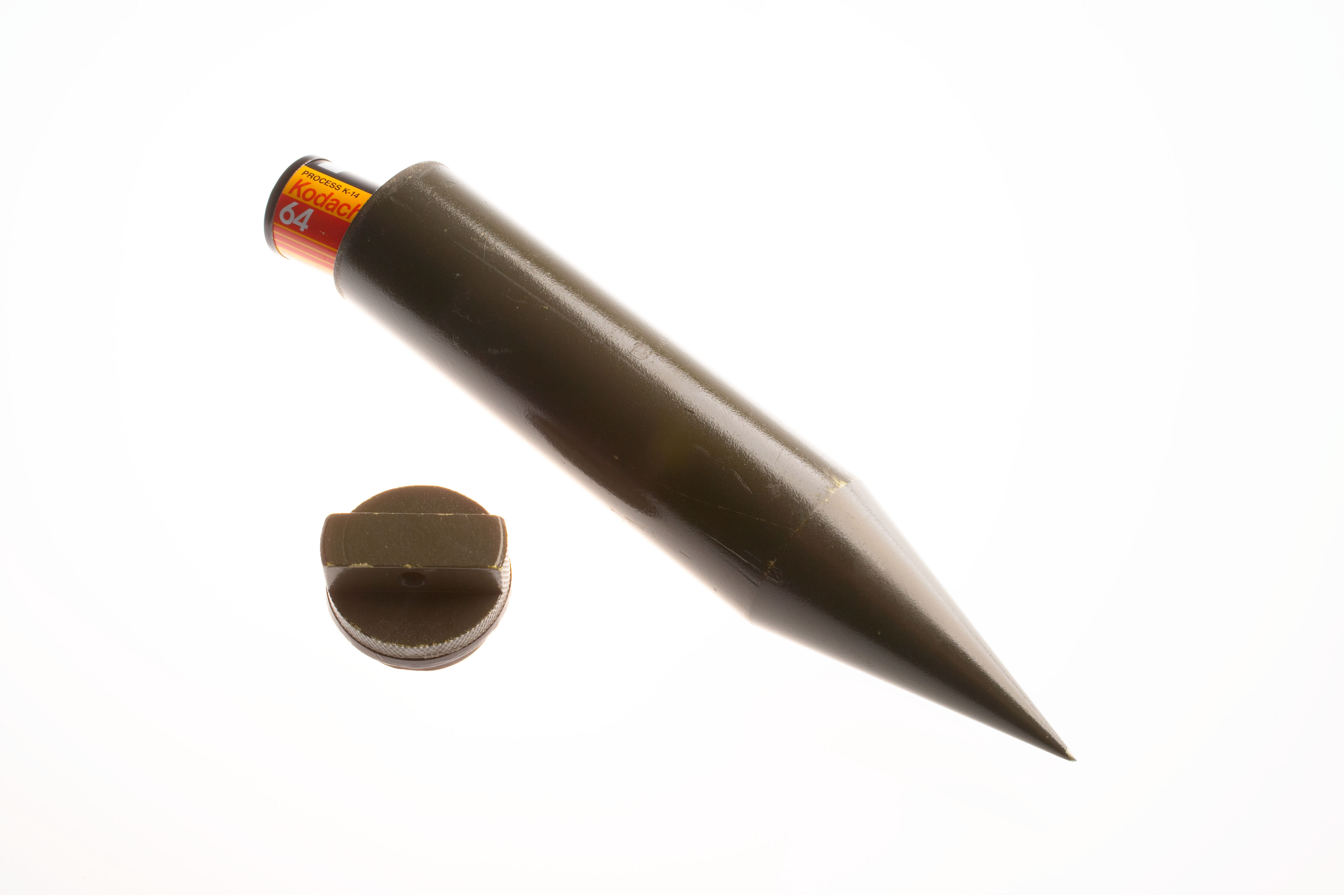
Dead drop spike

A dead drop spike is a concealment device similar to a microcache. It has been used since the late 1960s to hide money, maps, documents, microfilm, and other items. The spike is resistant to water and mildew and can be placed in the ground or submerged in a shallow stream for later retrieval. Another example was used by the KGB from a hollowed out industrial bolt.

Various signaling methods are employed to indicate that a dead drop has been made. These include chalk marks on a wall, a piece of chewing gum on a lamppost or a newspaper placed on a park bench. In some cases, signals are made from an agent's residence, visible from the outside, such as distinctively coloured towel hung from a balcony or a potted plant positioned on a windowsill.

== Drawbacks ==
While the dead drop method is useful in preventing the instantaneous capture of either an operative/handler pair or an entire espionage network, it is not without disadvantages. If one of the operatives is compromised, they may reveal the location and signal for that specific dead drop. Counterintelligence can then use the dead drop as a double agent for a variety of purposes, such as to feed misinformation to the enemy, identify other operatives, or to ultimately booby trap it. There is also the risk that a third party may find the deposited material.

== Modern techniques ==
On January 23, 2006, the Russian FSB accused Britain of using wireless dead drops concealed inside hollowed-out rocks ("spy rock") to collect espionage information from agents in Russia. According to the Russian authorities, the agent delivering information would approach the rock and transmit data wirelessly into it from a hand-held device, and later, his British handlers would pick up the stored data by similar means.

== See also ==
- Foldering
- PirateBox
- USB dead drop

== Bibliography ==
- "Russians accuse 4 Britons of spying".International Herald Tribune. January 24, 2006. News report on Russian discovery of British "wireless dead drop".
- "Old spying lives on in new ways". BBC. 23 January 2006.
- Madrid suspects tied to e-mail ruse. International Herald Tribune. April 28, 2006.
- Military secrets missing on Ministry of Defence computer files
- Robert Burnson, "Accused Chinese spy pleads guilty in U.S. 'dead-drop' sting", Bloomberg, 25 novembre 2019.
