= Keepalive (disambiguation) =

A keepalive is a message sent by one device to another to check that the link between the two is operating, or to prevent the link from being broken.

Keepalive or keep-alive may also refer to:

- HTTP keep-alive, using a single TCP connection to send and receive multiple HTTP requests/responses
- Keep-alive electrode, of a krytron
- Keepalive, a sculpture in Germany by Aram Bartholl
