= Jill Kelly =

Jill Kelly or Gillian Kelly may refer to:

- Jill Kelly (actress) (born 1971), American pornographic actress

== See also ==
- Jill Kelley (born 1975), American socialite and volunteer military liaison
