= Jack O'Connell (diplomat) =

American diplomat

John W. O'Connell (August 18, 1921 – July 12, 2010) was an American intelligence official, lawyer, diplomat, and author. He was a key adviser and confidant to King Hussein of Jordan.

== Life and career ==
O'Connell was born in Flandreau, South Dakota. He attended University of Notre Dame on a football scholarship. Unable to play after being injured in a car accident, he transferred to Georgetown University. He left school to serve in the United States Navy in World War II. In 1946, he graduated from the Edmund A. Walsh School of Foreign Service at Georgetown. He earned a law degree at Georgetown in 1948 and joined the Central Intelligence Agency (CIA) that year. He was sent to University of the Punjab in Pakistan on a Fulbright scholarship, receiving a master's degree in Islamic law in 1952. He returned to Georgetown and received a PhD in international law in 1958.

He served as the CIA station chief in Amman, Jordan from 1963 to 1971. His first CIA assignment led to the uncovering of a military coup against King Hussein. After becoming a confidant to King Hussein, O'Connell then became Hussein's attorney and diplomatic counselor in Washington for three decades.

His first wife Katherine MacDonald O'Connell, died in 1972. His second wife Syble McKenzie O'Connell died in 1990. O'Connell died of congestive heart failure at the Virginia Hospital Center in Arlington County, Virginia. His memoir King's Counsel: A Memoir of War, Espionage, and Diplomacy in the Middle East, written with Vernon Loeb, was published posthumously in 2011.
