= Martina Schumacher =

German painter

Martina Schumacher (born 1972 in Geislingen an der Steige, Germany) is a painter and conceptual artist.

== Education ==
Concomitantly while attending Royal College of Art in London, Schumacher was a master student under the tutelage of Prof. Georg Baselitz at Berlin University of the Arts.

== Career ==
Schumacher is a recipient of the Georg Meistermann Art Prize.

Though her works entail unusual materials such as plastic gels, sequins, pools of ink and tinted fluids, but not paint itself, Schumacher’s use of form and colour is said to derive from painterly thinking. About her largescale monochromatic painting "Along the Square", the Marli Hoppe-Ritter Collection observes that the work "brings key questions about painting together—such as the relationship between surface and depth, the effect of colour, and last but not least the relationship between concrete geometrical form and the representation of visible reality."

Schumacher's paintings have been exhibited at Museum Ritter in Waldenbuch, Museum Bochum, Temporäre Kunsthalle Berlin, Kunstverein Arnsberg, Kunstverein Bochum, Wilhelm Hack Museum in Ludwigshafen, Märkisches Museum in Witten, Mehdi Chouakri Gallery in Berlin, and Lombard-Freid Fine Arts in New York, and her work appears in permanent collections including the Richard Massey Foundation of Arts and Science in New York, the Marli Hoppe-Ritter Collection, and MONA in Tasmania.
