= Foldering =

Digital communication technique

Foldering is the practice of communicating via messages saved to the "drafts" folder of an email or other electronic messaging account that is accessible by multiple people. The messages are never actually sent.

Foldering has been described as a digital equivalent of a dead drop.

== History ==
Foldering was reportedly used by al-Qaeda at least as early as 2005 and it has also been used by drug cartels.

== Notable cases ==
In 2012, David Petraeus was reported to have used foldering to communicate with Paula Broadwell.

In June 2018, Greg Andres cited Paul Manafort's use of foldering as evidence that Manafort engaged in deceptive behaviours.

== See also ==
- Dead drop
- Tradecraft
