= David Darts =

David Darts is an artist and Chair of the Department of Art and Art Professions at New York University. He holds a PhD from the University of British Columbia and was previously a faculty member in the School of Art at the University of Arizona. He created the PirateBox, which is an autonomous mobile file sharing device designed to create local file sharing networks. It is inspired by the Free Culture and Pirate Radio movements and is registered with a Free Art License (FAL 1.3). Darts is curatorial director of Conflux, the annual art and technology festival for the creative exploration of urban public space. He is currently the Dean of Arts at NYU Abu Dhabi.
