= Jill Kelley =

Socialite and diplomatic consultant (born 1975)

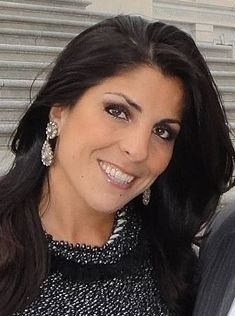
- Jill Kelley
- Born: Jill Gilberte Khawam; June 3, 1975 (age 51); Beirut, Lebanon
- Citizenship: American
- Occupations: Activist; philanthropist; diplomatic advisor
- Spouse: Scott Kelley (m. 1999)
- Children: 3
- Website: jillkelley.com

Jill Kelley (born July 3, 1975) is a Lebanese-American philanthropist, activist, and diplomatic advisor. She is also a former South Korean Honorary Consul, and a former honorary ambassador to U.S. Central Command under General James N. Mattis. She was an advisor to CIA-Director David Petraeus. She is president and founder of Military Diplomacy Strategies, an international advisory firm that advises embassies and multi-national companies to foster military and economic partnerships.

== Biography ==
Jill Kelley was born Gilberte Khawam on June 3, 1975 in Beirut, Lebanon to Syrian parents. Her identical twin sister is Natalie Khawam, a Washington, D.C. lawyer. She grew up near Philadelphia, and was known as Gigi. She has an older sister and a younger brother.

Her parents immigrated to the United States in 1976 and opened a Middle Eastern restaurant in Voorhees, New Jersey in 1988. Jill graduated from Lower Moreland High School in Huntingdon Valley, Pennsylvania in 1993. She then worked with a physician as a researcher at the University of Pennsylvania. She met Scott Kelley, a cancer surgeon, and the two married in 1998. The couple has three children.

Since the early 2000s, Kelley and her husband have been known for their lavish parties, with guest lists including military leaders and other dignitaries. Their parties in the Tampa area include bashes for the Gasparilla Pirate Festival. These include parties at their house in Tampa, and various events in Washington, D.C.

In 2021, Kelley was invited to serve as the Executive Director on the Board of Directors of Ionic Rare Earth, a publicly traded company specializing in rare earth heavy magnets and mining. The board expressed confidence that her appointment would greatly strengthen key relationships with global organizations, citing her extensive experience in high-level international leadership roles and her history of engaging with royals, presidents, prime ministers, and parliamentarians to advance military, security, and economic partnerships.

She also speaks Arabic.

== Career ==
In 2007, she founded the Doctor Kelley Cancer Foundation along with her husband and sister. The foundation's mission was "to conduct cancer research and to grant wishes to terminally ill adult cancer patients." The charity ceased operations in 2007 and was reinstated in 2015. Later, Kelley and her husband, Scott Kelley, started Kelley Land Holdings, a property company. In 2012, Kelley held the informal title of Honorary Consul to South Korea and served as Honorary Ambassador to U.S. Central Command in Tampa. Kelley runs an advisory firm called Military Diplomacy Strategies LLC and is a founder of SafeGuard Surgical, a medical technology company, as well as EdentifID, a blockchain technology company.

In April 2020, Kelley's husband, Dr Scott Kelley, set up and paid for a free nationwide COVID-19 hotline, a public service using AI that Dr. Kelley engineered to offer free triaging and medical evaluation to all Americans. During the height of the COVID-19 pandemic, the Kelleys funded a free hotline to serve marginalized and economically challenged communities. The hotline used artificial intelligence (AI) and analytics to deliver free test kits and telemedicine appointments to patients in need.

In 2021, Kelley assisted in the evacuation of hundreds of Afghans from their country when the Taliban seized power. Kelley, whose Catholic family immigrated to the US to escape religious persecution in Lebanon, continues to work through her diplomatic ties to extract more Afghan refugees from danger zones. In an interview about her work using multinational allies, Kelley was referred to as “a diplomatic fixer”. Kelley also provided support to rescue Christians and LGBTQ into Canada and has noted the special risks of these marginalized groups.

== Holiday meals ==
During President Biden's first Thanksgiving visit to Nantucket Island in 2021, Kelley and her husband opened up their Nantucket compound to serve a holiday meal to nearly 150 State Troopers and Secret Service agents left out of Thanksgiving plans due to a scheduling error. The Kelleys continued the tradition of hosting POTUS security team every holiday when Biden visited Nantucket Island.

== Petraeus scandal ==
Jill and Scott Kelley met General David Petraeus when he was transferred to MacDill Air Force Base in November 2008. They quickly became friends, and had frequent dinner parties together. Through the Petraeuses, the Kelleys became close to other senior military personnel, including John R. Allen and Robert Harward. In 2012, Kelley filed a complaint to the FBI that she was being harassed over email. The ensuing investigation uncovered that General Petraeus was having an extramarital affair with his biographer, Paula Broadwell, and that Broadwell had authored the emails to Kelley.

On June 3, 2013, Kelley filed a privacy lawsuit against the federal government alleging that investigators violated her privacy rights by unlawfully searching her personal emails and disclosing false descriptions of the nature of them to the media. In addition, she stated "false and untrue headlines created a media sideshow" at her expense, including her being wrongfully implicated in the extramarital affair between Petraeus and Broadwell.

In 2016, Kelley published a memoir about her role in the Petraeus scandal.

== Recognition and awards ==
- 2004 – Elected honorary social ambassador to the MacDill Air Force Base military community
- 2010 – Became first honorary military ambassador to Central Command
- 2010 – Appointed Honorary Consul for the Republic of Korea
- 2011 – Joint Chiefs of Staff Outstanding Public Service Award
- 2011 – Special advisor to CIA director David Petraeus
- 2012 – Confirmed as honorary ambassador to the U.S. Central Command under General James N. Mattis
