= Kunstverein Arnsberg =

Coordinates: 51°23′39″N 8°03′46″E

Kunstverein Arnsberg is an Association for Contemporary Art established in 1987 and located in Arnsberg, Germany.

== Building ==
The rooms of the Art Association are on the first floor of a neoclassical-style house at the central Neumarkt, designed by Karl Schinkel, whose basic structure is almost preserved. This historically listed building was built around 1820 for the judicial magistrate, Franz Friedrich Bernhard Hoeynck. The house formerly belongs to a large garden with a listed garden shed. The basic structure is almost totally preserved.

== Exhibitions and projects ==
- 2012 Marcus Steinweg
- 2012 Rafaël Rozendaal
- 2012 Jan Peter Hammer
- 2011 Conor Kelly
- 2011 Dani Dal
- 2011 Ayreen Anastas & Rene Gabri
- 2011 Tilman Wendland
- 2011 Lone Haugaard Madsen
- 2010 Martina Schumacher
- 2010 Dirk Bell
- 2010 Juliette Blightman
- 2010 Oystein Aasan
- 2010 Alexej Meschtschanow
- 2010 Ignacio Uriarte
- 2010 Julieta Aranda
- 2010 Anton Vidokle
- 2010 Ulf Aminde
- 2010 Daniel Knorr
- 2010 Swantje Hielscher
- 2010 Deborah Ligorio
- 2009 Laurent Grasso
- 2009 Yudi Noor
- 2009 Reto Pulfer
- 2009 assume vivid astro focus
- 2009 Yorgos Sapountzis
- 2009 Timo Nasseri
- 2009 Burghard
- 2008 Erwin Wurm
- 2008 Fiete Stolte
- 2008 Vlado Velkov
- 2008 Bretz / Holliger
- 2008 Susanne Schuricht
- 2008 Luka Fineisen
- 2008 Anja Ciupka
- 2008 Karin Sander
- 2008 Sabine Boehl
- 2007 Florian Bach
- 2007 Martin Dammann
- 2007 Marko Lulic
- 2007 Myriam Holme
- 2006 Gregor Schneider
- 2006 Anna Fasshauer
- 2006 Christoph Zwiener
- 2006 Martina Schumacher
- 2005 Misha Stroj
- 2005 Nasan Tur
- 2004 Boris Mikhailov
- 2004 Diango Hernández
- 2004 Susan Philipsz
- 2004 Vincent Tavenne
- 2003 Ricarda Roggan
- 2003 Dan Perjovschi
- 2003 Nine Budde
- 2003 Jürgen Meyer
- 2002 Jimmie Durham
- 2002 Heribert Friedl
- 2001 Julia Schrader
- 2001 Vincent Prud'Homme
- 2000 Ulrich Moskopp
- 2000 Beate Terfloth
- 2000 Mariusz Kruk
- 1999 Karin Sander
- 1999 Qin Yufen
- 1999 Heike Weber
- 1998 Platino
- 1998 Christoph Muller
- 1996 Katja Butt
- 1996 Annebarbe Kau
- 1996 Nina Hoffmann
- 1995 Jörg Czeschla
- 1995 Jürgen Zellerhoff
- 1994 Belu-Simon Fainaru
- 1994 Michael Buthe
- 1994 Chiarenza & Hauser
- 1994 Guillaume Bijl
- 1993 Thomas Kohl
- 1993 Ulrich Meister
- 1993 Andreas Karl Schulze
- 1992 Karnauke / Rahayel / Ulrich Rückriem
- 1992 Ingold Airlines
- 1992 Alfred Hoyos
- 1992 Cécile Hummel
- 1992 Ursula Mumenthaler
- 1991 Thomas Ruff
- 1991 Peter Bormann
- 1991 Heike Pallanca
- 1990 Bernd Finkeldei
- 1990 Emil Schumacher
- 1990 Robert Schad
- 1990 Wolfgang Sykownik
- 1989 Jochen Fischer
- 1989 Joeressen / Meier / Niessing
- 1989 Markus Lüpertz
- 1989 Kazuo Katase
- 1989 Peter Telljohann
- 1989 Birgit Antoni
- 1988 Georg Baselitz
- 1988 Ulrich Erben
