= All In: The Education of General David Petraeus =

Book about General David Petraeus

- Author: Paula Broadwell, Vernon Loeb
- Subject: David Petraeus
- Publisher: Penguin Press
- ISBN: 978-1594203183

All In: The Education of General David Petraeus is the biography of David Petraeus, written by co-authors Paula Broadwell and Vernon Loeb. The books were released on Tuesday, Jan. 24, 2012, it reached No. 33 on The New York Times Best Seller list in 2012.

== Reviews ==
Doris Kearns Goodwin referred to it as a "majestic biography." Tom Brokaw described it as a "riveting insider's account." Foreign Policy magazine described it as a "best read of 2012." Other sources described the book as "hagiographic," with author Max Boot saying he would have liked to have seen "a more objective" portrait of Petraeus presented.

== Broadwell-Petraeus affair ==
On November 9, 2012, Petraeus resigned as Director of the CIA after an FBI investigation showed that he and Broadwell were engaged in an extramarital affair, which some have claimed constituted a potential national security risk due to the classified information Broadwell gained access to.

== See also ==
- No Ordinary Assignment: A Memoir by Jane Ferguson (war correspondent).
