= PirateBox =

Portable electronic device that facilitates local file sharing

- Original logo of the PirateBox
- Introduced: 2011
- Discontinued: 2019
- Language: English

A PirateBox is a portable electronic device, often consisting of a Wi-Fi router and a device for storing information, creating a wireless network that allows users who are connected to share files anonymously and locally. By design, this device is disconnected from the Internet.

The PirateBox was originally designed to exchange data freely under the public domain or under a free license.

== History ==
The PirateBox was designed in 2011 by David Darts, a professor at the Steinhardt School of Culture, Education and Human Development at New York University under Free Art License. It has since become highly popular in Western Europe, particularly in France by Jean Debaecker, and its development is largely maintained by Matthias Strubel. The usage of the PirateBox-Concept turns slowly away from common local filesharing to purposes in education, concerning public schools or private events like CryptoParties, a crucial point also being circumvention of censorship since it can be operated behind strong physical barriers.

On 17 November 2019, Matthias Strubel announced the closure of the Pirate Box project, citing more routers having locked firmware and browsers forcing https.

== Set up ==
As of version 1.0, there is an improved installation path, with only a few steps followed by an automatic install.

== Raspberry Pi setup ==
The PirateBox can be set up in Raspberry Pi. The steps can be followed in the reference article.

== Uses ==
Users connect to the PirateBox via Wi-Fi (using a laptop, for example) without having to learn the password. They can then access the local web page of the PirateBox to download or upload files, or access an anonymous chat room or forum. All such data exchanges are confined to the PirateBox's local network and are not connected to the Internet.

Several educational projects use the devices to deliver content to students allowing them to share by chat or forum. The PirateBox is also used in places where Internet access is rare or impractical.

== Devices which can be converted to a PirateBox ==
- Android (v2.3+) devices: unofficial porting allowing to run a PirateBox on some rooted Android devices (example: smartphone and tablet computer). PirateBox for Android is available from Google Play (since June 2014).
- PirateBox Live USB: allows one to turn a computer temporarily into a PirateBox
- Raspberry Pi
- Chip

=== Wi-Fi routers ===
Not an exhaustive list:

- TP-Link MR3020 – the first device modified by Darts
- TP-Link MR3040
- Zsun WiFi Card Reader - hacked by installing OpenWRT, and there are efforts to produce easy installation instructions for PirateBox on this device.

The PirateBox official wiki has an up-to-date hardware-list of compatible devices.

== See also ==
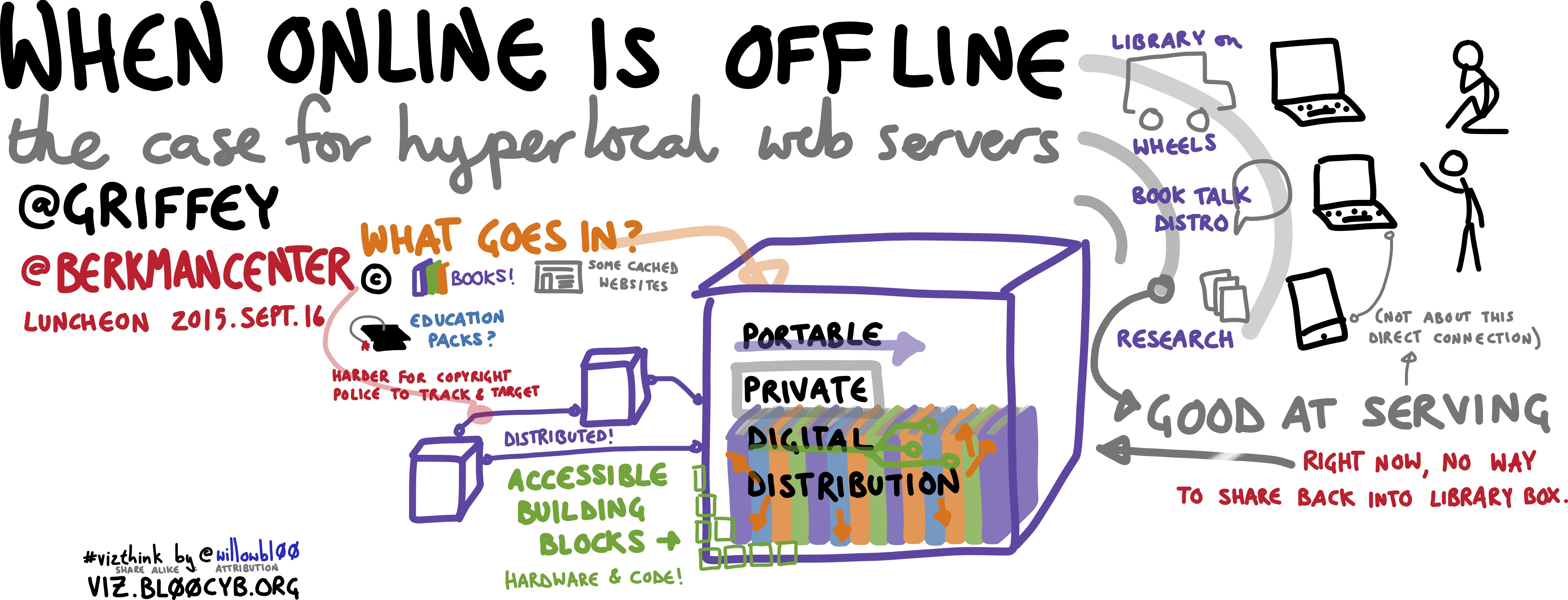
When online is offline

- AirDrop
- Nearby Share
- FreedomBox, a project similar to the PirateBox (plug computer version)
- Router (computing)
- Shoutr, a similar Android solution
- Sneakernet
- USB dead drop, a similar concept
