= Vernon Loeb =

American journalist and book author

- Occupation: Journalist
- Notable credit(s): The Washington Post, All In: The Education of General David Petraeus

Vernon F. Loeb is an American journalist and book author. Before being named managing editor at the Houston Chronicle Loeb was Metro Editor at The Washington Post.

He is co-author of the books King's Counsel: A Memoir of War, Espionage, and Diplomacy in the Middle East with Jack O'Connell, All In: The Education of General David Petraeus with Paula Broadwell, and Good Hunting: An American Spymaster's Story with Jack Devine.

== Life and career ==
Loeb began his career at The Philadelphia Inquirer in 1978. In 1994, Loeb joined The Washington Post as a city reporter. In 2004 he became California investigations editor at the Los Angeles Times. In 2007, he returned to The Philadelphia Inquirer and in 2011, returned to The Washington Post where he covered the Defense Department, and wrote a biweekly column called IntelligenCIA covering the United States Intelligence Community.

Loeb and his Washington Post co-author Susan Schmidt, along with Baltimore Sun columnist Gary Dorsey, wrote the first stories about the rescue of United States Army Private Jessica Lynch in 2003. The details of the story were later found to be inaccurate and part of a propaganda campaign by The Pentagon.

He is married to broadcast journalist Patricia Ford "Pat" Loeb. They have four children.
