= Constant Dullaart =

Dutch artist and curator

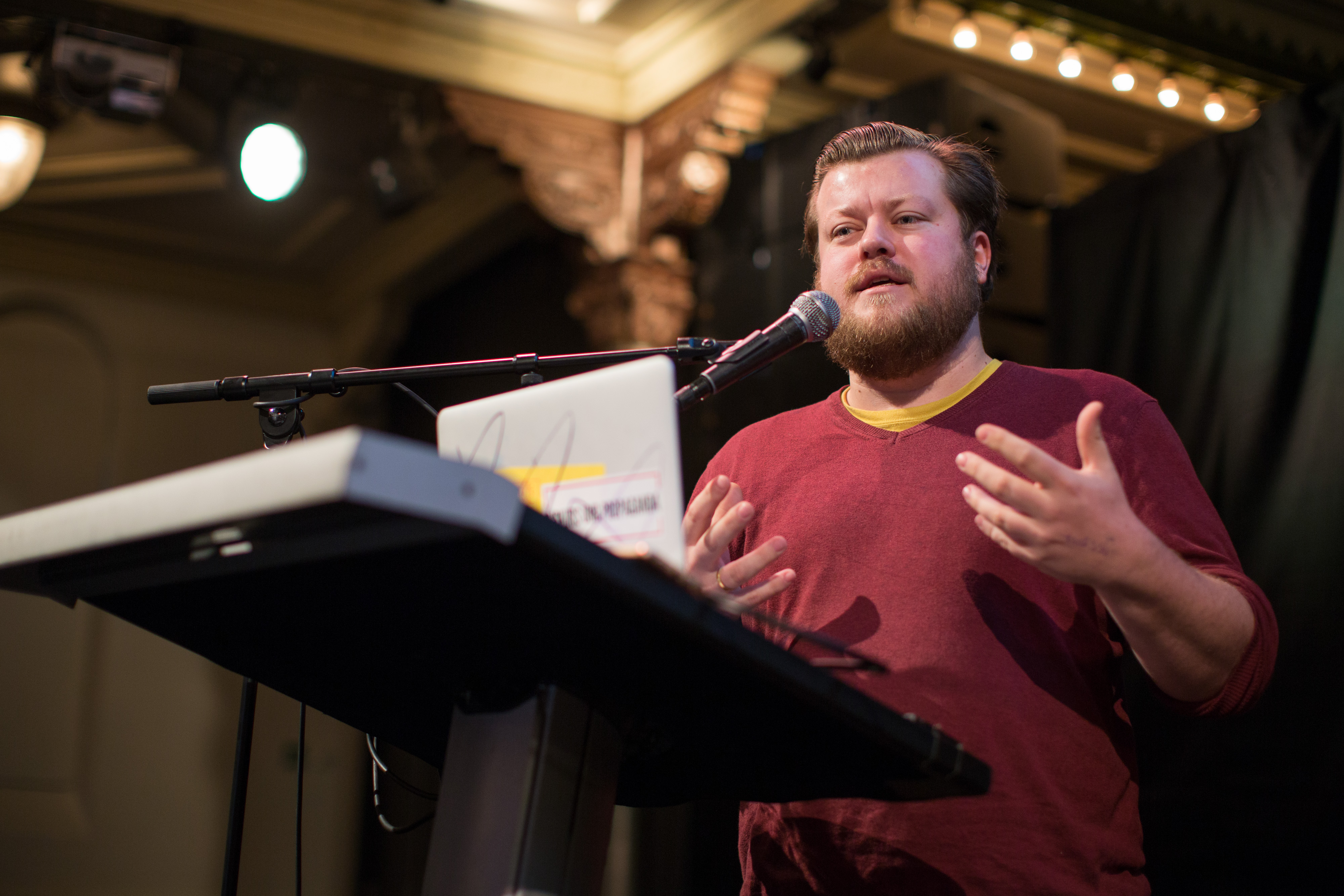
- Constant Dullaart, Crypto Design Challenge 2016
- Born: Constant Klaas Willem Dullaart; 7 March 1979 (age 47); Leiderdorp, Netherlands
- Education: Gerrit Rietveld Academie, Amsterdam; Rijksakademie, Amsterdam
- Known for: Conceptual art, Net Art
- Notable work: The Revolving Internet, Jennifer in Paradise, The Death of the URL, High Retention, Slow Delivery, The Possibility of an Army
- Awards: Prix Net Art 2015

Constant Dullaart (born 7 March 1979 in Leiderdorp) is a Dutch conceptual artist, media artist, internet artist, and curator. His work examines the cultural and social effects of communication and image-processing technologies, as well as the power structures of major internet corporations.

== Biography ==
Dullaart was born and raised in Leiderdorp in the Netherlands. He attended the Gerrit Rietveld Academy from 1997 to 2002. He was a resident at the Rijksakademie van beeldende kunsten from 2007 to 2008. Since 2023, Dullaart has been professor of Networked Materiality at the Academy of Fine Arts, Nuremberg.

Dullaart's 2013 work series Jennifer in Paradise uses and reworks the image used as the first photograph to demonstrate Photoshop.

He is also known for distributing 2.5 million bought Instagram followers amongst a personal selection of active art-world Instagram accounts.

In 2015, for a four-month durational performance commissioned by Schirn Kunsthalle Frankfurt, Dullaart created thousands of fake Facebook profiles using the names of Hessian soldiers from the Hetrina archive of the Landesgeschichtliches Informationssystem Hessen.

In 2015, Dullaart received the Prix Net Art.

== Selected works ==
- The Revolving Internet (2010), a browser-based work in which the Google search interface rotates while retaining its functionality.
- Jennifer in Paradise (2013), a series based on the image used to demonstrate early versions of Photoshop, which Dullaart reworked in digital and physical forms.
- The Death of the URL (2013), a web-based work using an unusually long .xxx domain name as a commentary on changing patterns of navigating the web and the growing role of platforms such as Google and Facebook.
- High Retention, Slow Delivery (2014), an online social-media intervention in which artificial followers were distributed among users in order to disrupt follower counts as measures of popularity.
- The Possibility of an Army (2015), an online performance commissioned by Schirn Kunsthalle Frankfurt that used fake Facebook accounts based on historical Hessian soldiers to examine digital identity and social-media metrics.

== Exhibitions (selection) ==
- 2025 – Choose Your Filter! Browser Art since the Beginnings of the World Wide Web, ZKM, Karlsruhe
- 2019 – Link in Bio, Museum der Bildenden Künste, Leipzig
- 2019 – Uncanny Values: Artificial Intelligence & You, MAK, Vienna
- 2019 – Behind the Screen, KINDL – Centre for Contemporary Art, Berlin
- 2019 – Festival van de Controle, Cultuurcentrum Hasselt, Hasselt
- 2018 – Cultural Matter: Constant Dullaart, LI-MA, Amsterdam
- 2018 – Follower Profiles, Foam, Amsterdam
- 2018 – I Was Raised on the Internet, Museum of Contemporary Art, Chicago, Chicago
- 2017 – Open Codes: Living in Digital Worlds, ZKM, Karlsruhe
- 2017 – Collecting Europe, Victoria and Albert Museum, London
- 2015 – The Possibility of an Army, Schirn Kunsthalle Frankfurt, Frankfurt
- 2014 – High Retention, Slow Delivery, Jeu de Paume, Paris
- 2013 – Jennifer in Paradise, Future Gallery and Import Projects, Berlin
