= Paula Broadwell =

American military figure (born 1974)

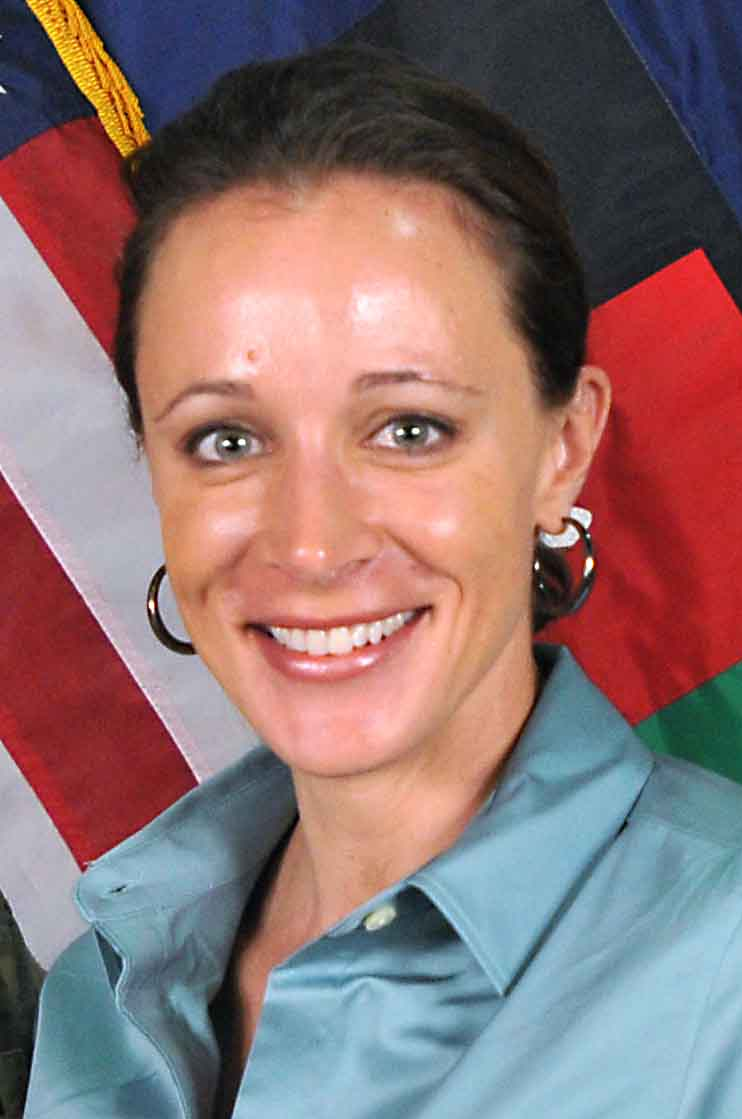
- Broadwell in 2011
- Born: Paula Dean Kranz; 9 November 1972 (age 53); Bismarck, North Dakota, U.S.
- Education: U.S. Military Academy (BS); University of Denver (MA); Harvard University (MPA); King's College London
- Occupations: Journalist, military officer
- Spouse: Scott Broadwell (m. 2000)
- Children: 2
- Writing career
- Notable work: All In: The Education of General David Petraeus

Paula Dean Broadwell (née Kranz; born 9 November 1972) is an American writer, academic and former military officer. Broadwell served in the US Army on both active and reserve duty for over 20 years (including time as a military school undergraduate). In 2012, she co-authored, with Vernon Loeb, All In: The Education of General David Petraeus, a biography of then-International Security Assistance Force commander David Petraeus. She was later revealed to have had an affair with Petraeus, leading to his resignation.

== Early life and education ==
Broadwell was born in Bismarck, North Dakota on 9 November 1972. She attended Century High School, where she was homecoming queen, valedictorian of the class of 1991, and an all-state basketball player. In 2006 Broadwell was inducted into the Century High School Hall of Fame.

Broadwell graduated from the United States Military Academy at West Point in 1995 with a Bachelor of Science degree in engineering and political geography. In 2006, she earned a Master of Arts degree in international security from the University of Denver's Josef Korbel School of International Studies, and went on to earn a Master of Public Administration degree from the John F. Kennedy School of Government at Harvard University in 2008.

Broadwell was a research associate in the Kennedy School's Center for Public Leadership Fellows, a term member at the Council on Foreign Relations, a Distinguished Young Leader in the French-America Foundation and American Council on Germany, and a national finalist in the White House Fellows program. Broadwell was elected as the Harvard student representative to the Academy of Achievement in 2006. During this time, she also worked at The Fletcher School at Tufts University as the Deputy Director of the Jebsen Center on Counter-Terrorism. In 2008, Broadwell entered the PhD program at the Department of War Studies at King's College London. As of February 2014 Broadwell was listed as a "former student" presumably without receiving a Ph.D. Her lead supervisor at KCL was Lawrence Freedman.

== Career ==
Broadwell served in the United States Army and the United States Army Reserve as a military intelligence officer on four continents, serving in the disciplines of electronic warfare, document exploitation, counterterrorism analysis and operations, and human intelligence work. In August 2012, Broadwell was promoted to the rank of lieutenant colonel in the Reserve. On 14 November 2012, Broadwell was stripped of her clearances to access classified information; her promotion to lieutenant colonel was revoked and she was demoted back to major. Broadwell was then classified by the Army as being ineligible for further promotion due to her being under investigation by the Army for the Petraeus affair scandal. This classification remained in place until the investigation was fully resolved.

Broadwell applied for a position with the FBI in 2001, passing the polygraph, academic, and life-experience requirements. A retired FBI agent quoted by The Daily Beast suggested that the FBI would have been very impressed with her qualifications and experience. While the FBI did offer Broadwell a position, she decided instead to attend Harvard University.

Broadwell met Petraeus in 2006 while he was a speaker at the Kennedy School of Government at Harvard University. She was a graduate student at the University of Denver at that time. According to The Charlotte Observer, Broadwell told him about her research interests after he spoke. He handed her his card and offered his help. She began a doctoral dissertation that included a case study of his leadership, with Petraeus fully cooperating. Broadwell then co-authored (with Vernon Loeb) a biography of Petraeus, All In: The Education of General David Petraeus which was published in January 2012. The writer Joshua Foust challenged the accuracy of Broadwell's account of the US destruction of the Afghan village of Khosrow Sofla. Soldiers and officers came to her defense, questioning Foust's hostility toward Broadwell.

Broadwell was deputy director of the Jebsen Center for Counter-Terrorism Studies at The Fletcher School of Law and Diplomacy at Tufts University. She also worked with the FBI Joint Terrorism Task Force.

Broadwell has also written for The New York Times, CNN Security Blog, and The Boston Globe, as well as publishing book chapters in edited volumes.

In June 2009 and June 2011 Broadwell attended meetings on Afghanistan-Pakistan policy in the Eisenhower Executive Office Building, which is part of the White House complex.

Broadwell is the co-founder and co-director of the Think Broader Foundation, a media consulting firm that focuses on addressing gender bias in the media and society.

== Personal life ==
=== Marriage and family ===
Broadwell is married to Dr. Scott Broadwell, an interventional radiologist who graduated from George Washington University School of Medicine in 1996. They resided in Charlotte, North Carolina, and have two sons.

The couple met in 2000, when they were both active duty U.S. Army captains. Scott Broadwell at the time was a physician and commander of the Mannheim military clinic in Germany and Broadwell was completing a military intelligence deployment. They married in Heidelberg Castle, with Lt. Col. Ronald Leininger, a Protestant Army chaplain, officiating.

== Petraeus affair ==
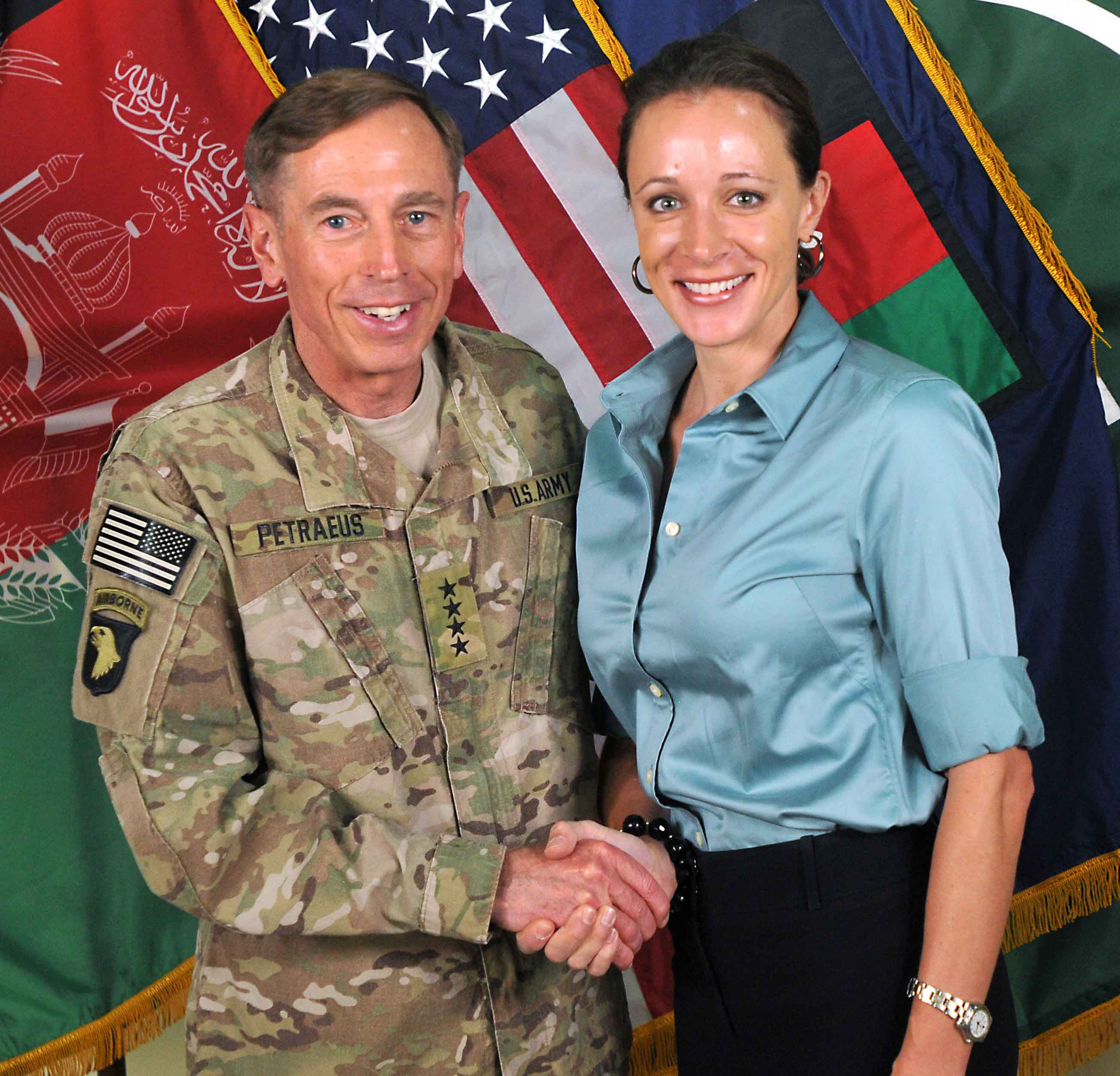
Paula Broadwell and General David Petraeus, 13 July 2011

In mid-2012, Broadwell sent a series of emails to General Jim Mattis, General John R. Allen, and Admiral Robert Harward, cautioning them about Jill Kelley. She also sent harassing emails to Kelley, apparently warning her to stay away from Petraeus. Kelley reported the stalking and threatening emails to the FBI, who then began an investigation since the emails contained confidential information about the CIA director's schedule.

The emails were prompted after Broadwell alleged that Kelley intimately fondled Petraeus under a table at a restaurant at the Four Seasons Hotel in Georgetown. Kelley denies the claim that she fondled Petraeus and alleges that Petraeus made those statements to the FBI to spare Broadwell from serving time in prison. The Department of Justice investigated Broadwell for obtaining classified information by illegally accessing Petraus' emails. The FBI called Broadwell in for questioning, at which time she admitted to her illegal access of Petraeus's emails. After Broadwell turned over her computer to the FBI, additional classified documents were found in her possession. The extra-marital affair between Broadwell and Petraeus was revealed in early November 2012 and was cited by Petraeus as the reason for his resignation on 9 November.

When the news of the scandal became public, Broadwell spent time secluded in Washington, D.C., at the home of her brother, Stephen Kranz, away from her husband and family. At the same time, her home in Charlotte, North Carolina, was being searched by the FBI. She subsequently returned to her family and the media took note of how the Broadwells tried to get back to normal life.
