= Renzo Martens =

Dutch artist

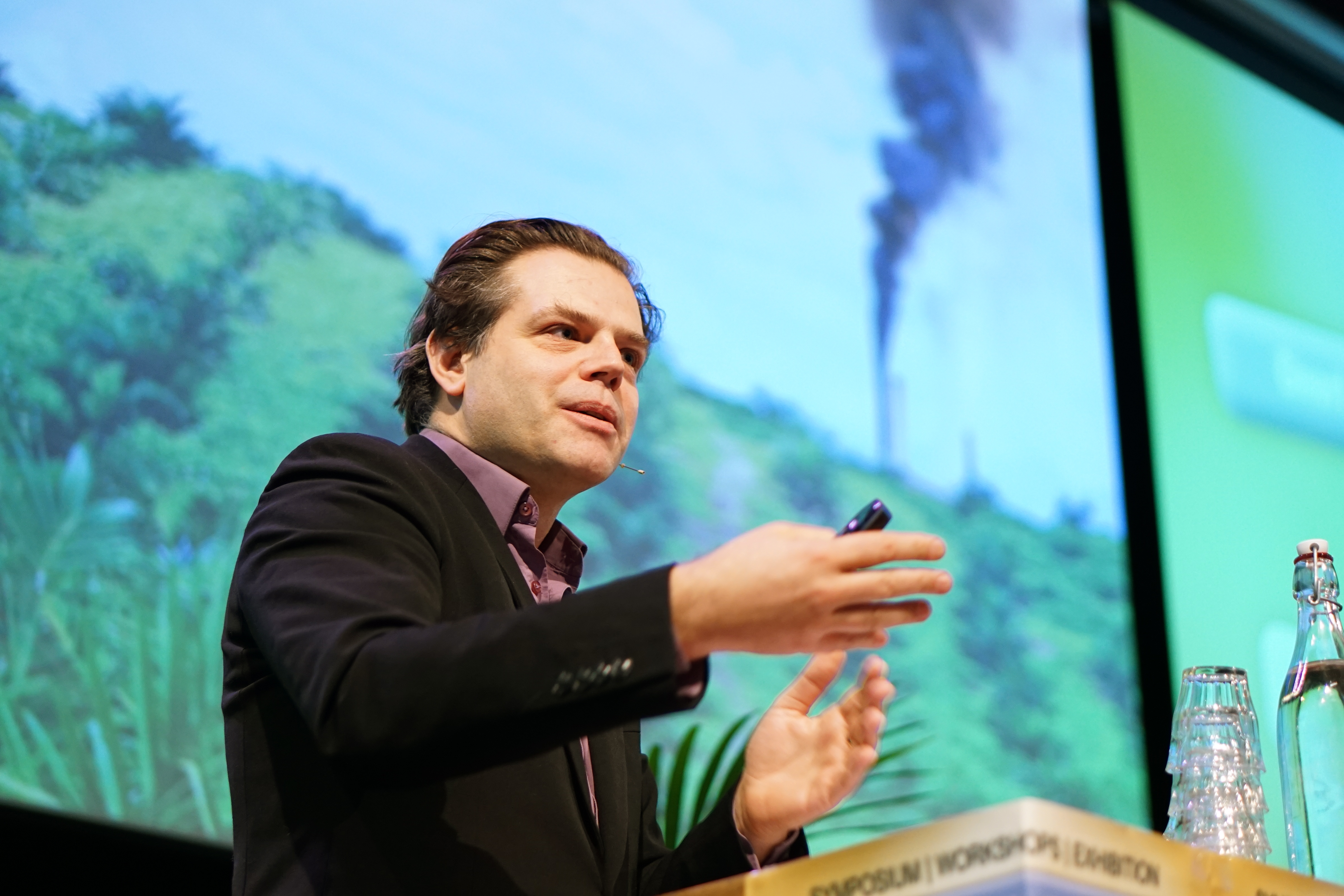
- Born: 3 September 1973 (age 53); Terneuzen, The Netherlands
- Education: Radboud University Nijmegen, Royal Academy of Fine Arts, Gerrit Rietveld Academie, Yale University
- Known for: Critical art, institutional critique, film
- Notable work: White Cube, Episode III: Enjoy Poverty
- Website: Official website KOW gallery

Renzo Martens (born 1973 in Terneuzen) is a Dutch artist who currently lives and works in Amsterdam and Kinshasa. Martens became known for his controversial work, including Episode III: Enjoy Poverty (2008), a documentary that suggests that the Congo markets its poverty as a natural resource. In 2010 Renzo Martens initiated the art institute Human Activities that postulates a gentrification program on a palm oil plantation in the Congolese rainforest.

== Biography ==
Renzo Martens studied Political Science at the University of Nijmegen and art at the Royal Academy of Fine Arts (KASK) in Ghent and the Gerrit Rietveld Academy in Amsterdam.

In 2010 Martens got approved as an artist-in-residence at the ISCP program in New York. In 2013 the artist attended the Yale World Fellows Program, the leadership program of Yale University. Martens is currently working on a PhD in the arts at the Royal Academy of Fine Arts (KASK) in Ghent. Martens has given lectures on art, economy and representation at University College London, London School of Economics, Yale University, Goldsmiths (University of London), Städelschule Frankfurt, HEAD Genève, KASK and Museo Nacional Centro de Arte Reina Sofia in Madrid.

Renzo Martens and CATPC are the Dutch entry for the Venice Biennale 2024. The curator is Hicham Khalidi.

== Work ==
=== Episode I ===
Martens made his first film, Episode I, in 2000 in Grozny, in Chechnya's war zones. The film is an atypical documentary in which footage of a war zone is mixed with a personal (love) story of the artist. Martens is in search of himself; with the camera self-centered, he questions the Chechens on what they think of him.

=== Episode III: Enjoy Poverty ===
Episode III: Enjoy Poverty articulates a comment on the political claims of contemporary art by referring to its own strategy. This film opened the International Documentary Film Festival Amsterdam (IDFA) in 2009. The film was shown in art events and venues such as the Centre Pompidou, The Berlin Biennial, Manifesta 7, The Moscow Biennial, Tate Modern, Stedelijk Museum Amsterdam, 19th Biennale of Sydney and several film festivals. Azu Nwagbogu (Founder and Director of African Artists’ Foundation and Director of Lagos Photo) called the film "The Guernica of our time."

=== Human Activities ===
Martens is commissioned as the artistic director of the art institute Human Activities, founded in 2012. HA's goal is to prove that artistic critique on economic inequality can also do something about this inequality materially, instead of only symbolically. Human Activities attempts to improve the lives of people around the art center by effectuating a 'reverse gentrification program'. Since 2014, it works in close collaboration with the Cercle d’Art des Travailleurs de Plantation Congolaise (CATPC), a cooperative of plantation workers that develops new ecological initiatives based on the production of art. CATPC operates from a former Unilever plantation, where they built a fully equipped arts center designed by OMA. The plantation workers who cannot earn a living from production labor, live off of their artistic engagement with plantation labor. The profits from the art sales are partly used to buy back the land, which has been exhausted after 100 years of monoculture. Subsequently, a lot of work is done to make the land fertile and usable again. This way, the residents regain control of the means of production on the plantation.

==== Opening Seminar ====
In 2012, Human Activities organised an opening seminar on a palm oil plantation in Boteka, DR Congo. Congolese and international speakers gathered at the plantation to discuss the history of the plantation, gentrification, and the possibilities for art to deal meaningfully with the conditions of its own existence. For two days, two-hundred people from the local community participated in a conference with art historian TJ Demos, philosopher Marcus Steinweg, activist René Ngongo, architect Eyal Weizman, economist Jérome Mumbanza, curator Nina Möntmann, anthropologist Katrien Pype, and artist Emmanuel Botalatala. Urban theorist Richard Florida delivered the keynote lecture via satellite.

==== Exhibitions ====
Human Activities has facilitated the global dissemination of works by CATPC in the art world, which resulted in exhibitions in places such as the Van Abbemuseum in Eindhoven, Middlesbrough Institute of Modern Art, Artes Mundi in Cardiff, and Kunst-Werke in Berlin, WIELS in Brussels, EYE Film Institute Netherlands in Amsterdam, M HKA in Antwerp, Art Basel, Kunsthal Charlottenborg in Copenhagen, Murray Art Museum Albury, the Art Gallery of New South Wales in Sydney, Mori Art Museum in Tokyo, Hayy Jameel in Jeddah and KOW gallery in Berlin. In January 2017, the cooperative opened its US debut at the SculptureCenter in New York. After earlier reviews in Artforum and The New York Times by amongst others Claire Bishop, Princeton professor Chika Okeke-Agulula heated the debate by questioning if this was "The latest frontier in the Western art world's self-congratulatory and all-too-sporadic missionary work?" Meanwhile, The New York Times added the exhibition to their list of 'The Best Art of 2017'.

==== The Matter of Critique ====
Human Activities started the international conference series titled The Matter of Critique to address the material conditions of critical artistic engagement. Through these conferences, Human Activities brings together academics, artists, and economists, as well as the Congolese plantations workers to discuss the artistic, social, and economic scope of its activities in Congo. Human Activities initiated its first international conference in 2015 at the KW Institute for Contemporary Art and in Lusanga. The third edition also took place in Lusanga, in 2016. The fourth edition took place at the SculptureCenter, New York, on January 29, 2017 with notably Ariella Azoulay, Simon Gikandi, David Joselit, Michael Taussig and CATPC artist Matthieu Kasiama.

==== The Repatriation of the White Cube ====
On April 21, 2017, Human Activities and CATPC opened a White Cube on the site of Unilever's first ever palm oil plantation, in Lusanga (formerly Leverville) in the Congolese interior. Designed by OMA, this White Cube is the cornerstone of the Lusanga International Research Centre for Art and Economic Inequality (LIRCAEI). During the opening, plantation workers held discussions on the benefits of a White Cube for a plantation with philosopher Suhail Malik, curator Clémentine Deliss, curator Azu Nwagbogu, the president of CATPC René Ngongo, and the Indonesian plantation workers union Serbundo.

In a discussion broadcast by ZDF with the artists Monica Bonvicini, Hans Haacke, and Renzo Martens, curator at large of dokumenta 14 Bonaventure Ndikung commented on this project that "Africa does not need a White Cube". On Designboom, the White Cube was listed as one of the 'TOP 10 museums and cultural venues of 2017'.

==== Inaugural exhibition "The Repatriation of the White Cube" ====
CATPC curated the inaugural exhibition of the White Cube in a network of Kisendus – traditional huts, especially built for the show, dedicated to arts and social events – linked to the White Cube. Different pieces referred to the D.R. Congo's rich history but had until then never been exhibited in the Congo. Participating artists included: Kader Attia, Sammy Baloji, Vitshois Mwilambwe Bondo, Marlene Dumas, Michel Ekeba, Eléonore Hellio, Carsten Höller, Irène Kanga, Matthieu Kasiama, Jean Katambayi, Jean Kawata, Mbuku Kimpala, Thomas Leba, Jérémie Mabiala, Daniel Manenga, Mega Mingiedi, Eméry Mohamba, Cédrick Tamasala, Pathy Thsindele and Luc Tuymans.

==== Post-Plantation ====
The opening of the White Cube museum marked the end of Human Activities' first research programme on gentrification. The institute has now started a new research programme on the creation of the "post-plantation": a new ecological and economic model based on art.

==== Balot NFT ====
With the support of Human Activities, the Cercle d’Art des Travailleurs de Plantation Congolaise (CATPC) launched a collection of 306 NFTs in response to the Virginia Museum of Fine Arts (VMFA)'s refusal to loan a Congolese sculpture, the "Diviner's Figure representing Belgian Colonial Officer Maximilien Balot" from 1931, for an exhibition at CATPC's White Cube museum. CATPC is one of the first to use a digital means of art restitution by employing NFTs. With the sale of the NFTs, the collective will buy back and restore land that has been exhausted due to monoculture in Lusanga, Congo. There is controversy surrounding the project due to the alleged copyright infringement of the VMFA's photographs of the sculpture, which CATPC used to create the NFTs, with press coverage in The Guardian, Artnet and more. The VMFA claims that the use of the photographs “violates our open access policy and is unacceptable and unprofessional”. In an article in The Art Newspaper, CATPC member Cedart Tamasala responds to the debate, stating that:

“The sculpture has been in Richmond for a long time,” Tamasala says. “Keeping it and not sharing it is a form of violence. We come from a country that has perpetual war. We don't want war. We do not want to oppose the museum. We are not here to have a conflict with them. The only thing we want is to rekindle a relationship with the sculpture. It is important to us. But we can only know it from afar. We want to change that.” - Cedart Tamasala (CATPC)

=== White Cube ===
In Renzo Martens’ latest film White Cube (2020), created in collaboration with the Cercle d'Art des Travailleurs de Plantation Congolaise (CATPC), he follows the plantation workers as they co-opt the concept of the ‘white cube’ to buy back their land from international plantation companies and secure it for future generations.

“Land or art. If I would have to choose, I would choose both. But if I really have to choose only one, I would choose the land. Where can I put my chair and start making art, if I do not own the land?” – Matthieu Kasiama (CATPC) in White Cube.

The film premiered simultaneously at the International Documentary Film Festival Amsterdam (IDFA) and in Lusanga, D.R. Congo, after which there was a 'global museum launch' in which White Cube was screened and discussions were held at multiple art institutions around the world, amongst others including the National Museum in Kinshasa, KW Institute for Contemporary Art in Berlin, Savannah Centre for Contemporary Art in Tamale, African Artists’ Foundation in Lagos, Institute of Contemporary Arts in London, Mori Art Museum in Tokyo, MPavilion in Melbourne, and Museum MACAN in Jakarta. About the film, Holland Cotter wrote in The New York Times:

"In short, the project, de-exoticizing and re-exoticizing, is politically problematic on almost every level, and it's fascinating for that reason. It raises questions about imbalances of power based on race and class that are at the very foundation of modern Western culture, but that our big museums have resolutely refused to address, never mind tried to answer."

== Awards ==
- 2024: S+T+ARTS Prize Africa: Grand Prize (with CATPC, for Balot NFT)
- 2021: 18th Seoul Eco Film Festival (Audience's Choice)
- 2021: “Tutta un’altra storia” Award at Biografilm Festival 2021
- 2017: Visible Award (shortlisted, with the Cercle d'Art des Travailleurs de Plantation Congolaise)
- 2015: Witteveen+Bos-prijs voor Kunst+Techniek
- 2015: Amsterdamprijs voor de Kunst (category "Best Performance")
- 2013: Yale World Fellow
- 2013: Culture Documentary Stipend
- 2010: Flanders cultural award for Film
- 2010: Incentive Price of Dutch Film Fund

== Criticism ==
In 2017 art collective Keeping It Real Art Critics published the critical movie 'Kirac 6' about Martens' approach to make art. In the movie they question the moral and motives of Martens related to the subject of poor African people he chooses for his projects.

== Solo exhibitions and screenings ==
- Leren, Graven, Bouwen (in collaboration with CAPTC and students of the Lodewijk College), Nesse, Terneuzen, 2025
- Two Sides of the Same Coin (in collaboration with CATPC), Van Abbemuseum, Eindhoven, The Netherlands, 2024
- The International Celebration of Blasphemy and the Sacred (in collaboration with CATPC and curator Hicham Khalidi), Dutch Pavilion (Rietveld Pavilion), 60th Venice Biennale, Venice, Italy, and simultaneously at the White Cube, Lusanga, DRC, 2024
- White Cube screening and artist talk, 10 Years of Double Feature, Schirn Kunsthalle Frankfurt, 2023
- XXII: Provoke me if you can. The crisis of artistic disturances with Núria Güell, Renzo Martens and Florian Malzacher, Art of Assembly, Munich, 2023
- White Cube and Episode III: Enjoy Poverty screening, Palazzo Grassi, Venice, Italy, 2022
- White Cube screening, Points communs, Paris, France, 2022
- BALOT (in collaboration with CATPC), KOW, Berlin, Germany, 2022
- Global Launch White Cube (2021):
  - White Cube debate, with Renzo Martens, Ibrahim Mahama and Kari Kacha Seidou, SCCA, Tamale, Ghana
  - Online White Cube debate, with Nurhady Sirimorok and Halim HD moderated by Asri Winata, Museum MACAN, Jakarta, Indonesia
  - White Cube dialogue between curator Kirill Adibekov, Cedart Tamasala and Renzo Martens, VAC, Moscow, Russia
  - Screening of White Cube and debate, with Henry Bundjoko, Franklin Mubwabu Mbobe, Pala Kamango, René Ngongo, Cedart Tamasala, Matthieu Kasiama, Mbuku Kimpala and Eléonore Hellio, moderated by Charles Tumba, National Museum, Kinshasa, DRC
  - Screening of White Cube and online debate, with Renzo Martens, Mami Kataoka, Cedart Tamasala, Eleonore Hellio and Hikaru Fujii, Mori Art, Tokyo, Japan
  - Screening of White Cube and an online discussion, with Renzo Martens, Surafel Wondimu and Cedart Tamasala, Sharjah Art Foundation and The Africa Institute, Sharjah, United Arab Emirates
  - Screening of White Cube and a debate, with Charles Esche and Cedart Tamasala, moderated by Renzo Martens, Van Abbemuseum, Eindhoven
  - A debate with Renzo Martens, Cedart Tamasala, Oluwatoyin Sogbesan and Azu Nwagbogu, in collaboration with Alliance Française de Lagos, African Artists’ Foundation, Lagos, Nigeria
  - Screening of White Cube with an introduction by Renzo Martens, David Gianotten, Cedart Tamasala, with Helen Runting and Arsene Ijambo, MPavilion, Melbourne, Australia
  - White Cube Screening and conversation, with Azu Nwagbogu and Suhail Malik, ICA, London, UK
  - White Cube screening and debate, with Sandrine Colard, Aymar Nyenyezi Bisoka, Jean François Mombia Atuku and Renzo Martens. Moderated by Wendy Bashi, Wiels, Brussels and Picha, Lubumbashi, DRC
  - White Cube screening and debate, with Clémentine Deliss, Tirdad Zolghadr and Renzo Martens, KW, Berlin, Germany
- FORCED LOVE (in collaboration with CATPC), KOW, Berlin, Germany, 2020
- Forced Love (in collaboration with Irene Kanga / CATPC), EYE Filmmuseum, Amsterdam, the Netherlands, 2020
- The Repatriation of The White Cube (in collaboration with CATPC), Lusanga, DRC, 2017
- Cercle d’Art des Travailleurs des Plantations Congolaise (in collaboration with CATPC), SculptureCenter, New York City, USA, 2016
- Cercle d’Art des Travailleurs des Plantations Congolaise (in collaboration with CATPC), MIMA, Middlesbrough, UK, 2015
- A New Settlement (in collaboration with CATPC), Galerie Fons Welters, Amsterdam, the Netherlands
- A Lucky Day (in collaboration with CATPC), KOW, Berlin, Germany
- The Matter of Critique (in collaboration with CATPC), KW Institute for Contemporary Art, Berlin, Germany, 2015
- A Capital Accumulation Program, The BOX Gallery, Los Angeles, 2014
- Episode III, Göteborgs Konsthall, 2011
- Episode III, Wilkinson Gallery, London, 2009
- Episode III, Stedelijk Museum Bureau Amsterdam, Amsterdam, 2008
- Episode I, Vtape, Toronto, 2005
- Episode I, Marres, Maastricht, 2004
- Episode I, Gallery Fons Welters, Amsterdam, 2003
- Rien ne va plus, de Merodestraat, Brussel, 1999

== Group exhibitions ==
Selection from the last 14 years

- MUSEUM YET TO BE (in collaboration with CATPC), Museum of Contemporary Art of Montenegro, Podgorica, 2025
- The Way We Are 5.0 (in collaboration with CATPC), Weserburg Museum for Modern Art, Bremen, 2023
- Into The Great Wide Open (in collaboration with CATPC), Vlieland, 2023
- Economics the Blockbuster – It’s not Business as Usual (in collaboration with CATPC), The Whitworth, Manchester, 2023
- My Last Will, Kunstsammlungen Chemnitz, 2023
- Someone Is Getting Rich (in collaboration with CATPC), Tropenmuseum, Amsterdam, 2023
- Monomaterial (in collaboration with CATPC), Kunstsaele, Berlin, 2023
- Das Auto Rosi Aber, KOW Berlin, 2022
- Ruins and Empires (in collaboration with CATPC), Sofia Art Projects II, Sofia, 2022
- The Way We Are 4.0 (in collaboration with CATPC), Weserburg Museum for Modern Art, Bremen, 2022
- Dream City Festival (in collaboration with CATPC), L’Art Rue, Tunis, 2022
- Dig Where You Stand (in collaboration with CATPC), SCCA Tamale, 2022
- KOW (in collaboration with CATPC), Art Basel, Switzerland, 2022
- Time is Going – Archive and Future Memories (in collaboration with CATPC), Dak'art Biennale, Dakar, Senegal, 2022
- Made in X (in collaboration with CATPC), Extra City, Antwerp, Belgium, 2022
- Hurting and Healing: Let's Imagine a Different Heritage (in collaboration with CATPC), Tensta Konsthall, Stockholm, Sweden, 2022
- Staple: What's on your plate? (in collaboration with CATPC), Art Jameel, Jeddah, Saudi Arabia, 2021
- Risquons-Tout (in collaboration with CATPC), Wiels, Brussels, Belgium, 2021
- MONOCULTURE | A Recent History, M HKA, Antwerp, Belgium, 2019
- Freedom – The Fifty Key Dutch Artworks Since 1968, Museum De Fundatie, Zwolle, The Netherlands, 2019
- Picture Industry, Luma Foundation, Arles, France, 2019
- KOW (in collaboration with CATPC), Art Basel, Switzerland, 2019
- Catastrophe and the Power of Art (in collaboration with CATPC), Mori Art Museum, Tokyo, Japan, 2018
- The Way Things Run, Part II: Cargo (in collaboration with CATPC), PS120, Berlin, Germany, 2018
- Superposition: Equilibrium & Engagement (in collaboration with CATPC), 21st Biennale of Sydney, Australia, 2018
- TRANSAKTIONEN, Über den Wert künstlerischer Arbeit HaL (in collaboration with CATPC), Haus am Lützowplatz, Berlin, Germany, 2017
- The Armory Show (in collaboration with CATPC) (Focus selection), New York City, USA, 2017
- Bread and Roses (in collaboration with CATPC), Museum for Modern Art, Warsaw, Poland, 2016
- Neither Back Nor Forward: Acting in the Present, Jakarta Biennial, Indonesia, 2015
- Produktion (in collaboration with CATPC), Galerie nächst St. Stephan, Vienna, Austria, 2015
- Confessions of the Imperfect (in collaboration with CATPC), Van Abbe Museum, Eindhoven, The Netherlands, 2014
- Artes Mundi 6 (in collaboration with CATPC), National Museum Cardiff, UK, 2014
- Böse Clowns, Hartware Medien Kunstverein, Dortmund, Germany, 2014
- Manifesto! An alternative history of photography, Folkwang/Winterthur, Germany/Switzerland, 2014
- Hunting and Collecting, Mu.Zee, Ostend, Belgium, 2014
- You Imagine what You Desire, 19th Biennale of Sydney, Sydney, Australia, 2014
- 9 Artists, MIT List Visual Art Center, Cambridge, USA, 2014
- Arte Útil, Van Abbe Museum, Eindhoven, The Netherlands, 2013
- global aCtIVISm, ZKM I Museum of Contemporary Art, Karlsruhe, Germany, 2013
- 9 Artists, Walker Art Center, Minneapolis, USA, 2013
- Ghost in the system - scenarios for resistance, Moscow Biennale, Moscow, Russia, 2013
- Space of Exception, Artplay, Moscow Biennale, Moscow, Russia, 2013
- Either/Or, Haus am Waldsee, Berlin, Germany, 2013
- Either/Or, Nikolaj Kunsthal, Copenhagen, Denmark, 2013
- Forget Fear, 7th Berlin Biennial, Berlin, Germany, 2012
- Models for Taking Part, Kenderdine Art Gallery, Saskatoon, Canada, 2012
- A Series of Navigations, Sligo, Ireland, 2012

== Conferences and lectures ==
- Learn, Dig, Build, CATPC in Dialogue with Havîn Al-Sîndy, Johannes Büttner, Simon Denny, Nir Evron, Paul Kolling (terra0), Christopher Kulendran Thomas, Renzo Martens, JP Raether, and Alex Wissel, K21 Kunstsammlung, Düsseldorf, 2025
- Bathtub Lecture, Stedelijk Museum, Amsterdam, 2024
- The Repatriation of the White Cube, including Suhail Malik, Clementine Deliss, Azu Nwag bogu, The White Cube, Lusanga, DRC, 2017
- The Matter of Critique IV, including David Jocelit, Ariella Azoulay, Simon Gikandi, Michael Taussig, Sculpture Center, NYC, USA, 2017
- The Matter of Critique III, including Filip De Boeck, Eva Barois de Caevel, The White Cube, Lusanga, DRC, 2016
- The Matter of Critique II, including Serge Kakudji, Charles Sikitele Gize, Pathy Tshindele, The White Cube, Lusanga, DRC, 2017
- The Matter of Critique I, including Stephan Heidenreich, Charles Esche, Armen Avenissian, KunstWerke, Berlin, Germany, 2017

== Publications ==
- Critique in Practice: Renzo Martens' Episode III (Enjoy Poverty), Anthony Downey (Ed.), MIT Press, 2019
- CATPC: Cercle d'art des travailleurs de plantation congolaise, Els Roelandt, Eva Barois De Caevel (Ed.), Sternberg Press, 2017
