= Congolese Plantation Workers Art League =

Collective of artists who make chocolate sculptures

- Abbreviation: CATPC
- Legal status: Collective
- Location: Lusanga, Democratic Republic of the Congo
- Products: Sculptures
- Members: 20+
- Leader: René Ngongo
- Affiliations: Unilever
- Website: catpc.org/home/

CATPC, an acronym for 'Cercle d'Art des Travailleurs de Plantation Congolaise' in French translates to 'Congolese Plantation Workers Art League' in English. Founded in 2014 by a group of Congolese plantation workers in collaboration with Congolese environmental activist and founder of Greenpeace Congo René Ngongo, CATPC operates as an art cooperative. CATPC is based in Lusanga, formerly known as Leverville, Unilever's first plantation in the Democratic Republic of the Congo. In 2017, CATPC built an art center named White Cube Lusanga.

CATPC specializes in clay sculptures, reproduced in Europe using materials such as cacao and palm oil, common products derived from plantations. CATPC is critical of the plantation system, an extractive and exploitative colonial construct with dangerous labor conditions, low wages, and environmental devastation among its faults. Many museums have been or are still funded by companies like Unilever that own or depend on plantation labor. CATPC's art attempts to expose this exploitative system and bring about positive economic, social and ecological change to their own plantation and community.

The art collective uses income generated from exhibitions and sales of their artworks to buy back and restore their land using the principles of agroforestry. The overarching goal is to develop a regenerative model where artistic expression provides the community of Lusanga with land ownership and sustainable livelihoods. CATPC calls this the "post-plantation", since it provides a sustainable alternative to the prevalence of monoculture plantations. Whereas a traditional plantation is based on extracting one crop (palm oil in the case of Leverville) and leaving the land depleted while exporting the crop to other countries, everything grown in CATPC's post-plantation goes back to the community and restores the land.

CATPC's sculptures have gained international recognition, with exhibitions at renowned venues including SculptureCenter, Kunsthal Charlottenborg Biennale, 22nd Biennial Sesc_Videobrasil, SCCA Tamale, KOW, Hayy Jameel, EYE Filmmuseum, among others. CATPC, Renzo Martens and curator Hicham Khalidi, will represent the Netherlands at the Venice Biennale 2024.

== History ==
=== Origins ===
Established in August 2014, CATPC originated from a collaboration between plantation workers from three different plantations in the south of the Democratic Republic of the Congo (DRC). They worked with Kinshasa-based artists Michel Ekeba, Eléonore Hellio, and Mega Mingiedi to exchange ideas and develop the creation of critical art.

=== Members and collaborators ===
As of 1 May 2024 CATPC comprises 25 members: Djonga Bismar, Alphonse Bukumba, Irène Kanga, Muyaka Kapasa, Matthieu Kasiama, Jean Kawata, Huguette Kilembi, Mbuku Kimpala, Athanas Kindendi, Felicien Kisiata, Charles Leba, Philomène Lembusa, Richard Leta, Jérémie Mabiala, Plamedi Makongote, Blaise Mandefu, Daniel Manenga, Mirra Meya, Emery Muhamba, Tantine Mukundu, Olele Mulela, Daniel Muvunzi, Alvers Tamasala and Ced’art Tamasala. The president of CATPC is René Ngongo, biologist, environmentalist and political activitst based in Kinshasa.

CATPC collaborates regularly with Human Activities, art institute founded by Dutch artist Renzo Martens. Together, they founded the White Cube museum in Lusanga, organize exhibitions and conferences and make art.

CATPC is represented by KOW, contemporary art gallery in Berlin.

=== The Matter of Critique conferences ===
In 2012, LIRCAEI (Lusanga International Research Centre on Art and Economic Inequality) and Human Activities organized a series of four international conferences titled "The Matter of Critique". These conferences brought together academics, artists, curators and CATPC members to engage in critical discussions covering a wide spectrum of activities in Congo – from art to society to the economy. Notable speakers included art historian T.J. Demos, philosopher Marcus Steinweg, activist René Ngongo, architect Eyal Weizman, economist Jérome Mumbanza, curator Nina Möntmann, anthropologist Katrien Pype, artist Emmanuel Botalatala, curator Ellen Blumenstein, and theorist Ariella Azoulay.

=== White Cube museum ===
In 2017, CATPC inaugurated the White Cube, the first museum on a plantation. The opening was accompanied by an exhibition titled "The Repatriation of the White Cube". Designed by OMA, the architecture and nomenclature draw on the modernist art historical tradition of white cube galleries and the privileges and gatekeeping associated with these types of institutions. By placing a white cube on a plantation, a site that has funded many popular museums in the Western art world (such as the Tate Modern "Unilever Art Series"), CATPC and Human Activities claim to "prove that artistic critique on economic inequality can effectively reverse that inequality".

"Established as an apolitical space to sustain art’s timeless value, can a white cube still be a platform to address inequality in the art economy, or even an active agent to make timely social changes?"

The White Cube museum, central to CATPC's artistic and social initiatives, is complemented by various facilities, including a conference center, atelier for art creation, and ecological farming gardens and fields.

=== SculptureCenter Solo Exhibition and Conference ===
In 2017 CATPC had their first solo exhibition in the United States, at SculptureCenter in Long Island City. The exhibition included both existing and new sculptures and drawings.

The center also hosted a public conference on CATPC’s works and their connections with the rest of the art world. Ariella Azoulay, Simon Gikandi, Eléonore Hellio, David Joselit, Matthieu Kilapi Kasiama, Ruba Katrib, Renzo Martens, Els Roelandt, and Michael Taussig all took place in this edition of SculptureCenter Conversations: Matter of Critique Part IV.

=== Dutch Pavilion of the Venice Biennale 2024 ===
In April 2023, it was announced that CATPC, together with artist Renzo Martens and curator Hicham Khalidi, will present a simultaneous and linked exhibition at the Dutch pavilion of the Venice Biennale and the White Cube in Lusanga, opening in April 2024.

"The opportunity to now pair a white cube on a plantation with one at the summit of the art world allows for a direct look into these two worlds and into the inequalities between them". – CATPC member Ced'art Tamasala.

CATPC argues that art institutions should realise that their buildings and programmes are financed by the very same companies that exploited plantation labour. For Biennale Arte 2024 CATPC presents new sculptures in both the Dutch Pavilion and the White Cube. Alongside, the Dutch Pavilion presents the performance film The Judgement of the White Cube. The ancestral sculpture Balot plays a central role in both exhibitions. For CATPC this wooden statue, made in 1931, is of great significance, connecting the past with the present.

Ced'art Tamasala, on behalf of CATPC: “Each sculpture is a seed that brings back the sacred forest. These sculptures will function as vehicles that enable a shared, just future for all people. They will help us reclaim our stolen land and bring back the sacred forest.”

=== List of works ===
CATPC is best known for their chocolate sculptures but has also ventured into drawings, videos, photographs and textile works. CATPC's sculptures include portraits and allegories. Their material, the cocoa bean, carries political connotations, including concerns for its controversial labor conditions and effect on the environment.

==== Sculptures ====
- Self Portrait without Clothes, Mbuku Kimpala, 2014
- The Spirit of Palm Oil, Djonga Bismar 2014
- Self Portrait, Menenga Kibwila, 2014
- Self Portrait, Djonga Bismar 2014
- Self Portrait, Emery Muhamba, 2014
- The Art Collector, Jérémie Mabiala & Djonga Bismar 2015
- Poisonous Miracle, Thomas Leba, 2015
- The Art Collector, Jeremie Mabiala & Djonga Bismar 2015
- A Man Is What the Head Is, Matthieu Kasiama, 2015
- The Visionary, Djonga Bismar 2015
- We Who Are Here And You Who Have Come, Emery Muhamba & Mbuku Kimpala, 2015
- A Lucky Day, Thomas Leba & Daniel Manenga, 2015
- How My Grandfather Survived, Ced'art Tamasala, 2015
- Forced Love, Irene Kanga, 2019
- Forced Labor, Jean Kawata & Ced'art Tamasala, 2020
- The Mad Art Collector, Emery Muhamba, 2020
- White Cube Lusanga, Jean Kawata & Ced'art Tamasala, 2020
- Pende Vengeance 1931, Richard Leta, 2021
- Money is/and the Beast, Muyaka Kapasa, 2021
- Couple of Equality, Mbuku Kimpala, 2021
- Plantation Monoculture, Athanas Kindendie, 2022
- White Cube Lusanga, Ced’art Tamasala & Jean Kawata, 2023
- Mvuyu Liberator, Blaise Mandefu, 2023
- Lady of Museums, Mbuku Kimpala, 2023
- Congo Massacre, Muyaka Kasapa, 2023
- Money Angel, Philomène Lembusa, 2023
- Fish Protector, Daniel Mvunzi, 2023
- Roots, Irene Kanga, 2023
- Polyculture Brain, Athanas Kindendie & Charles Leba, 2023
- Wonderful Birth, Huguette Kilembi & Mirra Meya, 2023
- Seedbed, Muyaka Kapasa & Ced'art Tamasala, 2023
- Plantation Master, Olele Mulele Labamba, 2023
- Crucifixion of the Art Collector, Matthieu Kasiama & Ced'art Tamasala, 2023

==== Drawings and textile ====
- 4 Coins Post Plantation, Matthieu Kasiama, 2022
- Untitled, Ced'art Tamasala, 2023
- Arts & Agriculture: Vision Future, Matthieu Kasiama, 2022
- Aveugle Visonnaire, Kifiameso ya kumuna na ntuala, Matthieu Kasiama, 2022
- Balot, Ced’art Tamasala, 2022
- Balot / Retour de la Violence, Matthieu Kasiama, 2022
- Chemin d'idées, Kukwisa ya bangindu, Matthieu Kasiama, 2022
- Esprit fâché de Balot, Esprit Colon, Matthieu Kasiama, 2022
- Féticheur ou démon du village, Jean Kawata, 2016
- L’exode des fournis noir, Ced’art Tamasala, 2019
- Mukuni Le Semeur, Matthieu Kasiama, 2022
- Pende Control Esprit Balot, Matthieu Kasiama, 2022
- Reservation Naturelle, Matthieu Kasiama, 2022
- Résistance, Matthieu Kasiama, 2016
- Résistance 2, Plantation Monoculture, Matthieu Kasiama, 2022
- Untitled, Leba Maboki, 2018
- Voleur piégé, Mao Kingunza, 2016
- Africa Vide, Europe Plein, CATPC, 2021
- Résistant déporté et incarcéré (Kimbangu) / Resistance fighter deported and incarcerated (Kimbangu), Mbuku Kimpala, Ced'art Tamasala and Jérémie Mabiala / CATPC, 2022
- Résistant déporté et incarcéré (Les révoltés de Kilamba) / Resistance fighter deported and incarcerated (The revolts of Kilamba), Mbuku Kimpala, Ced'art Tamasala and Jérémie Mabiala / CATPC, 2022
- Résistant déporté et incarcéré (Lumumba) / Resistance fighter deported and incarcerated (Lumumba), Mbuku Kimpala, Ced'art Tamasala and Jérémie Mabiala / CATPC, 2022

===== Resistance Fighter Series =====
Subtitle	Artists	Year
Resistance Fighter Series: Brother Ibrahim Mahama	Ced'Art Tamasala, Plamedi Makongote / CATPC	2024
Resistance Fighter Series: Dancer of a group of traveling wayang topeng players, Batavia	Ced'Art Tamasala, Mirra Meya, Plamedi Makongote / CATPC	2024
Resistance Fighter Series: Female workers at Deli Plantations, Sumatra	Mbuku Kimpala, Tantine Mukundu, Charlotte Leba, Philomène Lebusa, Irène Kanga, Huguette Kilembi, Muyaka Kapasa, Athanas Kindendi / CATPC	2024
Resistance Fighter Series: Female workers at Deli Plantations, Sumatra	Muyaka Kapasa, Charlotte Leba, Olele Mulela, Philomène Lembusa, Jean Kawata, Ced'Art Tamasala / CATPC	2024
Resistance Fighter Series: Female workers at plantations in Java or Deli, Sumatra	Emery Muhamba, Irène Kanga, Plamedi Makongote, Ced'Art Tamasala / CATPC	2024
Resistance Fighter Series: Jean-Jacques Dessalines	Matthieu Kasiama, Olele Mulela, Jean Kawata, Mirra Meya / CATPC	2024
Resistance Fighter Series: Karikacha	Matthieu Kasiama, Ced'Art Tamasala, Plamedi Makongote, Alvers Tamasala / CATPC	2024
Resistance Fighter Series: Keti Koti, Free man of Suriname	Alphonse Bukumba, Jean Kawata, Tantine Mukundu / CATPC	2024
Resistance Fighter Series: Male plantation worker from Java or Sumatra	Jean Kawata, Muyaka Kapasa, Charlotte Leba / CATPC	2024
Resistance Fighter Series: Mama Kimpavita	Richard Leta, Athanas Kindendi, Tantine Mukundu, Charlotte Leba, Plamedi Makongote / CATPC	2024

==== Balot NFT ====
In 2022, CATPC created an NFT (non-fungible token) of a sculpture created by their Pende ancestors. The sculpture depicts the Belgian officer Maximilien Balot and was created during the Pende rebellion of 1931, following rape and other crimes committed by Belgian colonial officials. Carved in wood, it was most likely created to control Balot's spirit after he was beheaded. The sculpture is now part of the Virginia Museum of Fine Arts (VMFA)'s African art collection in Richmond.

From CATPC's perspective, "The lost item, the Balot sculpture, was made for the main purpose, to control the spirit of dead Balot, which could wander and harm the Pende or their surroundings. Currently, what role does he play?". The making of the NFT sparked a controversy in the press, addressing concerns about CATPC's loan requests and their usage of the VMFA's photograph of the Balot sculpture. In Daniel Boffey's The Guardian article, a VMFA spokesperson was quoted for saying that the "image was lifted directly from the museum's website without permission, which violates our open access policy and is unacceptable and unprofessional". Renzo Martens, collaborator on the project, said they, "downloaded the image from the internet, as there is no other material made available by the VMFA".

"We have the strong impression that they are not ready to lend it to us; it can be lent to a museum in Switzerland or elsewhere, but not to a museum in the plantation for the resistance against which, among other things, it was designed and sculpted". – Ced'art Tamasala (CATPC)

In 2024, CATPC's loan request to display the sculpture at the White Cube in Lusanga, DRC, as part of the Venice Biennale was accepted.

=== Video and film ===
==== Plantations and Museums, CATPC, 2021 ====
This work is a 6-channel video following Matthieu Kasiama and Ced'art Tamasala, CATPC members, as they embark on a quest to recover the Balot sculpture, which their community lost decades ago and which they hope to return to Lusanga. The two artists speak with postcolonial specialists, uncover hidden ties between plantations and museums and pay a visit to the collector who purchased the sculpture in 1972, subsequently selling it to the Virginia Museum. Kasiama and Tamasala appear at the museum, asking to loan the sculpture to present in their own museum.

==== White Cube, featuring CATPC, 2020 ====
The documentary film White Cube (2020), directed by Renzo Martens, offers an in-depth portrayal of CATPC's journey, capturing their artistic endeavors, the construction of the museum and their land purchasing efforts. The films shows how CATPC and Martens seek to return the proceeds of the plantation workers' labor by asking major artists to donate artworks to a new plantation art museum as recompense for having received Unilever patronage through the Tate Modern. The artist Carsten Höller is one of the artists that donated.

=== Publications and merchandise ===
In 2017, a book titled Cercle d'art des travailleurs de plantation congolaise, edited by Els Roelandt and Eva Barois De Caevel, was published by Sternberg Press. The book provides an initial report on CATPC's activities, portraying the uniqueness of its members and partner institutions, aiming to challenge postcolonial power relations within the global art world.

=== Notable exhibitions ===
==== Solo exhibitions ====
Year	Title	Location
2026	Het Land van Hagelslag	H'ART Museum, Amsterdam
2025	Two Sides of the Same Coin	Van Abbemuseum, Eindhoven
2024	International Celebration of Blasphemy and the Sacred	Dutch pavilion, Venice Biennale
2022	Balot	KOW, Berlin
2022	Memory is an Editing Station	22nd Biennial Sesc_Videobrasil, São Paulo
2021	Forced Love	KOW, Berlin
2020	Forced Love	EYE Filmmuseum, Amsterdam
2018	Cercle d’Art des Travailleurs de Plantation Congolaise	NT Gent, Ghent
2017	The Repatriation of the White Cube	White Cube, Lusanga
2017	Cercle d’Art des Travailleurs de Plantation Congolaise	SculptureCenter, New York
2016	Cercle d’Art des Travailleurs de Plantation Congolaise (CATPC)	Middlesbrough Institute of Modern Art

==== Group exhibitions ====
Year	Title	Location
2026	The Plantation Plot	Kadist, Paris
2026	Performing Conditions: Artistic Labor and Dependency as Form	MIT List Visual Arts Center, Cambridge (MA)
2026	Labouring Bodies	Museum Tinguely, Basel
2025	MUSEUM YET TO BE	Museum of Contemporary Art of Montenegro, Podgorica
2025	Le Partage du Travail Sensible: Landscape	Mokili na Poche, Kinshasa
2025	Peace with Earth	Tensta Konsthall, Stockholm
2025	Manifesto of Spring	National Asian Culture Center, Gwangju
2025	Land and Soil	K21, Düsseldorf
2024	The Learning Garden	Diriyah Biennale
2024	Dig Where You Stand – From Coast to Coast	Hangar Lisbon
2024	The Way You Are 5.0	Weserburg, Bremen
2024	Fellow Travellers	ZKM, Karlsruhe
2024	FUTURE OURS	UN Summit of the Future, New York City
2024	Dig Where You Stand – From Coast to Coast	Benin
2023	Fruits of Labor	Museum Dhondt-Dhaenens, Deurle
2023	Kunsthal Charlottenborg Biennale 2023	Kunsthal Charlottenborg, Copenhagen
2023	Someone is getting rich	Wereldmuseum, Amsterdam (formerly: Tropenmuseum)
2023	Economics the Blockbuster	The Whitworth, Manchester
2023	Memory is an Editing Station	Videobrasil Biennial, São Paulo
2023	Monomaterial	Kunstsaele, Berlin
2022	Remember Me: Liberated Bodies	Lagos Photo Festival, Lagos
2022	Art Basel	Basel
2022	The Way We Are 4.0	Weserburg Museum for Modern Art, Bremen
2022	Dig Where You Stand	SCCA Tamale, Tamale
2022	Toxicity	Lubumbashi Biennial, Lubumbashi
2021	Staple: What’s on your plate?	Art Jameel, Jeddah
2021	Risquons-Tout	Wiels, Brussels
2020	Out of the Dark II	KOW, Berlin
2020	Catastrophe and the Power of Art	Mori Art Museum, Tokyo
2018	The Way Things Run, Part II: Cargo	PS120 Berlin
2018	#whatif	Kunsthal Charlottenburg, Copenhagen
2018	The Land We Live In – The Land We Left Behind	Hauser & Wirth, Somerset
