= Steinweg =

Steinweg is a German surname that may refer to

- Henry E. Steinway (born Steinweg; 1797–1871), German-American piano maker
  - Grotrian-Steinweg, a German manufacturer of luxury pianos
- C.F. Theodore Steinway (born Steinweg; 1825–1889, in Brunswick), German-American piano maker, son of Henry
- Klara Steinweg (1903–1972), German art historian, specializing in the Italian Renaissance.
- Marcus Steinweg (born 1971), German philosopher
- Stefan Steinweg (born 1969), German racing cyclist
- William Steinway (born Steinweg; 1835–1896), German-American businessman and civic leader, son of Henry
