= Flandria =

Flandria may refer to a number of things.

- Club Social y Deportivo Flandria, an Argentine football team
- SS Flandria, a Dutch merchant ship
- Heinrich Isaac, a 15th-century composer, known as "Ugonis de Flandria"
- Flandria (cycling team), cycling team active 1957–1979
- The Latin name for Flanders (a county of Belgium).
- Another name for Boteka
