= Thomas Hirschhorn =

Swiss artist (born 1957)

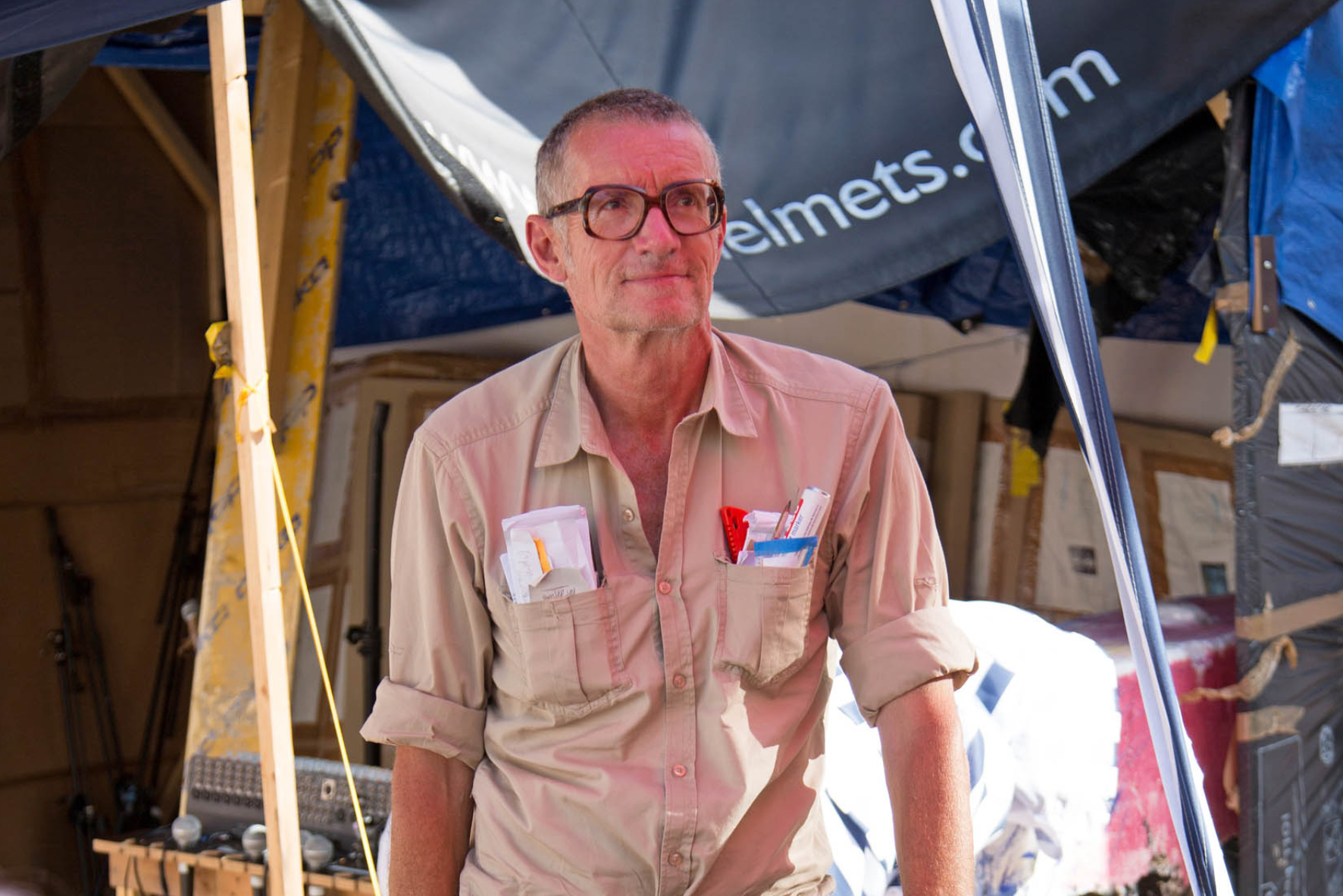
- Thomas Hirschhorn at the "Robert Walser-Sculpture", Biel/Bienne, 2019 (photo: Enrique Muñoz García)
- Born: 16 May 1957 (age 69); Bern, Switzerland
- Education: Kunstgewerbeschule Zürich
- Known for: Sculpture, art in public spaces
- Movement: Contemporary art
- Awards: Marcel Duchamp Prize

Thomas Hirschhorn (born 16 May 1957) is a Swiss artist who lives and works in Paris.

Trained in Zurich and inspired by Joseph Beuys and Andy Warhol, he began as a graphic designer and switched to art in the 1990s. He has become known for using everyday materials in the creation of complex sculptures executed often on a large scale. In addition, he has written extensively on his work and the theories that inform it. His work has been exhibited in galleries and museums in Europe, in the United States, and in South America.

== Biography and work ==
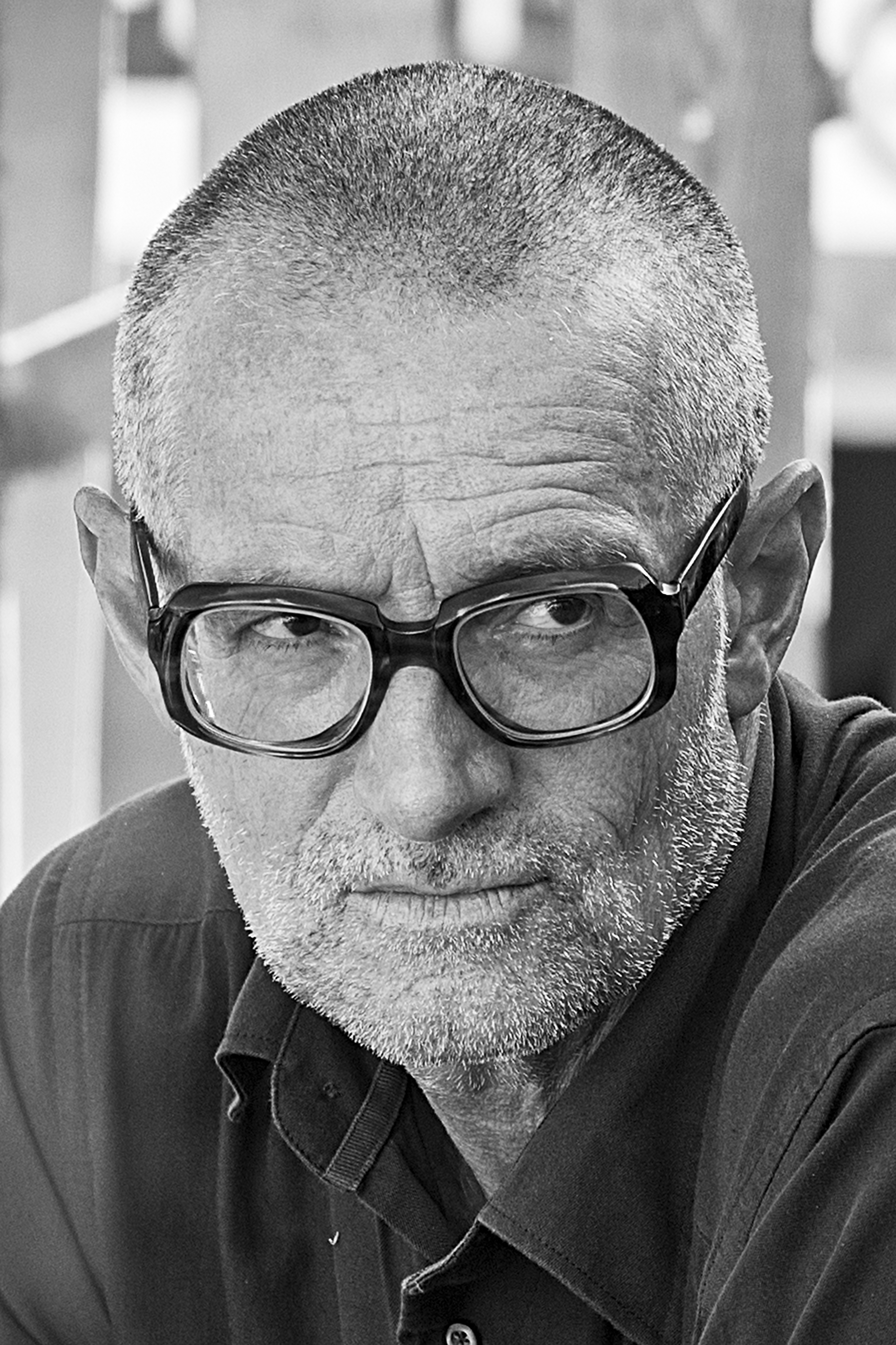
Thomas Hirschhorn in 2019 at the Robert Walser-Sculpture in Bienne.

=== Early years ===
From 1978 to 1983, Hirschhorn attended the School of Applied Arts in Zurich, where he was inspired by Beuys and Warhol exhibitions. In 1983, Thomas Hirschhorn came to Paris to take part in the 'Grapus'-collective as a graphic designer.

=== Art in public space ===
In 1991, he left graphic design in favor of being an artist. He then started to create works in space that incorporate sculpted forms, words and phrases, free-standing or wall mounted collages, and video sequences. He uses common materials such as cardboard, foil, duct tape, magazines, plywood, and plastic wrap. He describes his choice to use everyday materials in his work as "political" and that he only uses materials that are "universal, economic, inclusive, and don't bear any plus-value". All of his works are accompanied by written statements that include his observations, motivations and intentions.

Hirschhorn has followed his early commitment to always include the "Other" and address the "non-exclusive audience" in presenting his work in exhibition spaces such as museums and galleries, but also in "public space": urban settings, sidewalks, vacant lots, and communal grounds of public housing projects.

He has said that he is interested in the "hard core of reality", without illusions, and has displayed a strong commitment to his work and role as an artist. He described working and production as "necessary", discounting anyone who encourages him to not work hard, and says "I want to be overgiving in my work". Hirschhorn is also very adamant about not being a political artist, but creates "art in a political way."

Aiming "to demonstrate the importance that art can have in transforming life", he created in 2004 the Musée précaire Albinet in Aubervilliers, France, where he presented for two months original artworks from the Musée national d'Art moderne and the Fonds national d'art contemporain. The artworks presented included modern art icons such as Bicycle Wheel by Marcel Duchamp, and works by Kazimir Malevich, Piet Mondrian, Salvador Dalí, Josef Beuys, Andy Warhol, Le Corbusier, and Fernand Léger. Located in the public space at the foot of a building bar, in a popular suburb of Paris, the project was an almost unprecedented attempt to bring museum art to underprivileged populations in their own space. The presentation of the works was complemented by numerous workshops, discussions and activities organised with the local population.

Through his experience of working in public space, Hirschhorn has developed his own guidelines of "Presence and Production" in being present and producing on location during the full course of a project in public space. "To be 'present' and to 'produce' means to make a physical statement, here and now. I believe that only through presence — my presence — and only through production — my production — can my work have an impact in public space or at a public location." Other 'Presence and Production' projects besides the Musée Précaire Albinet include Bataille Monument (Kassel, 2002), The Bijlmer Spinoza Festival (Amsterdam, 2009), Gramsci Monument (New York, 2013), Flamme éternelle (Palais de Tokyo, Paris, 2014), What I can learn from you. What you can learn from me (Critical Workshop) (Remai Modern, Saskatoon, 2018), and the Robert Walser-Sculpture (Fondation Exposition Suisse de Sculpture, Biel, 2019).

Since the early 1990s, Thomas Hirschhorn has created more than seventy works in public space.

=== Art and philosophy ===
Thomas Hirschhorn has dedicated works to writers, philosophers, artists he loves, in the form of altars, kiosks, maps, monuments or sculptures. In 1999 he initiated a series of "monuments" dedicated to major writers and thinkers: the Spinoza Monument (Amsterdam, 1999), followed by Deleuze Monument (Avignon, 2000) and Bataille Monument (Kassel, 2002). From the beginning, the monuments have been planned and constructed in housing projects occupied mostly by the poor and working class, with their agreement and help.

In 2013, Gramsci Monument, tribute to the Italian political theorist and Marxist Antonio Gramsci, was the fourth and last monument, and the first project that Hirschhorn built in the United States. It was a site-specific, participatory sculpture at the Forest Houses public housing complex in the Bronx. This series of works is based on Hirschhorn's will "to establish a new definition of monument, to provoke encounters, to create an event. [...] My love for Antonio Gramsci is the love of philosophy, the love of the infinitude of thought. It is a question of sharing this, affirming it, defending it, and giving it form." The monument hosted concerts, workshops and lectures on critical theory. It was named by Frieze as No.25 of "The 25 Best Works of the 21st Century".

In 2000, Hirschhorn exhibited Jumbo Spoons and Big Cake at the Art Institute of Chicago to complement the exhibit at The Renaissance Society at the University of Chicago, Flugplatz Welt/World Airport. The 12 Jumbo Spoons are memorials to individuals that he associates with failed utopian ideals. The Big Cake represents excess and violence. World Airport (1999), a clutter of cellophane, tape, partitions, lighting strands, tarmac, televisions, planes, cars, and luggage, represented the artists inability to comprehend the world.

For his piece Cavemanman (2002), he transformed a gallery space into a cave using wood, cardboard, tape, neon tubes, and books, and put various philosophical and pop culture symbols throughout it.

He presented a lecture as part of the "Image & Text: Writing Off The Page" lecture series through the Visiting Artists Program at the School of the Art Institute of Chicago in Spring, 2006.

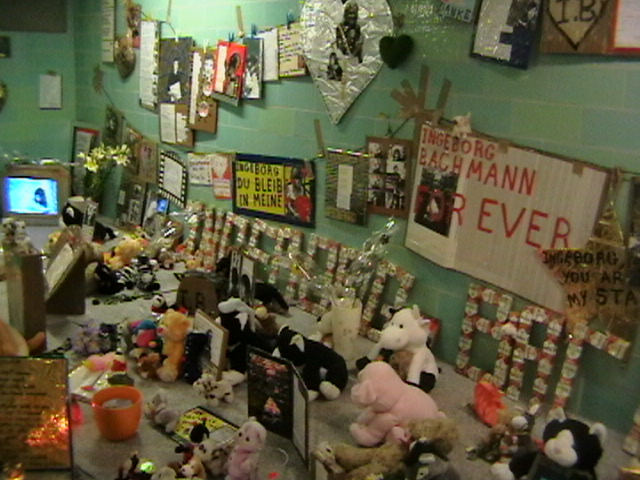
Ingeborg Bachmann Altar, Berlin Alexanderplatz station (2006).

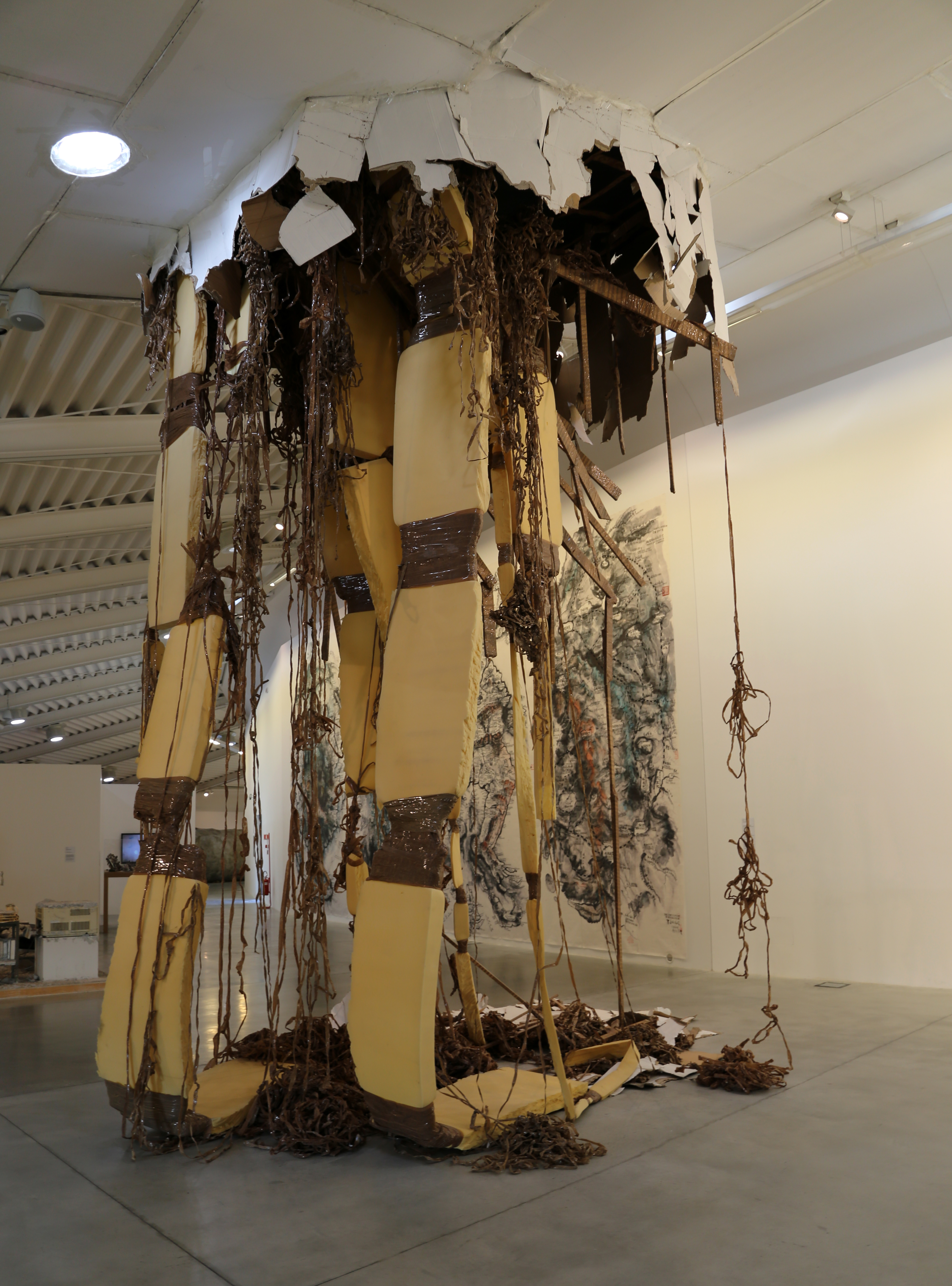
Break-Through, Centro per l'arte contemporanea Luigi Pecci, Prato, 2016.

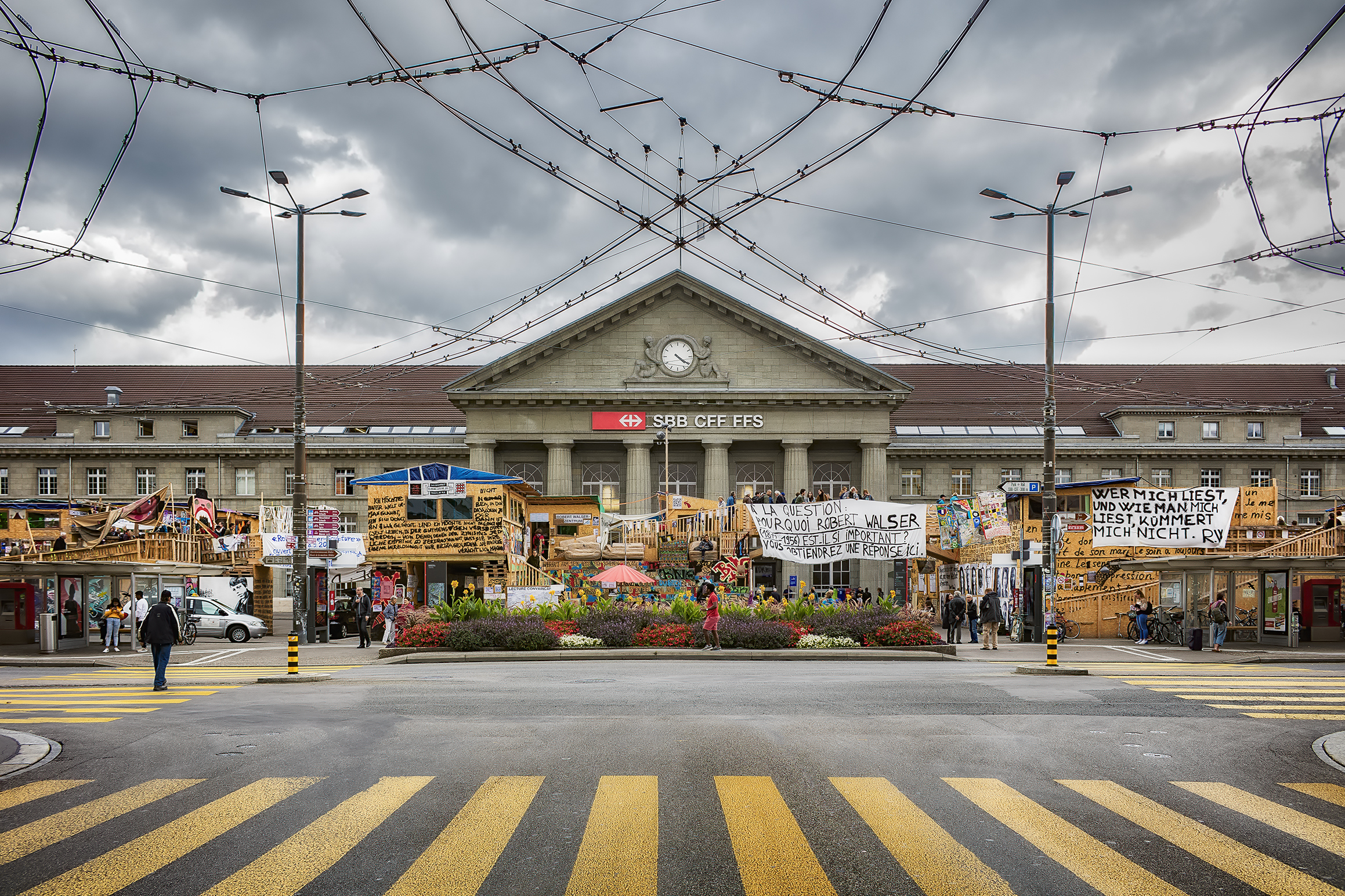
Robert Walser-Sculpture, 2019, Bienne.

== Exhibitions ==
Since his first solo show in 1986 (Bar Floréal, Paris), Thomas Hirschhorn has had solo exhibitions at international venues, including the Art Institute of Chicago (1998); Kunsthalle, Bern (1998); and Remai Modern, Saskatoon (2018).

In the summer of 2009, his work Cavemanman was recreated for the exhibition Walking in my Mind at London's Hayward Gallery. Cavemanman was recreated once again in 2022 at the exhibition Dream On by NEON showcasing works from the D.Daskalopoulos Collection Gift at the former Public Tobacco Factory of Athens, Greece.

== Collections ==
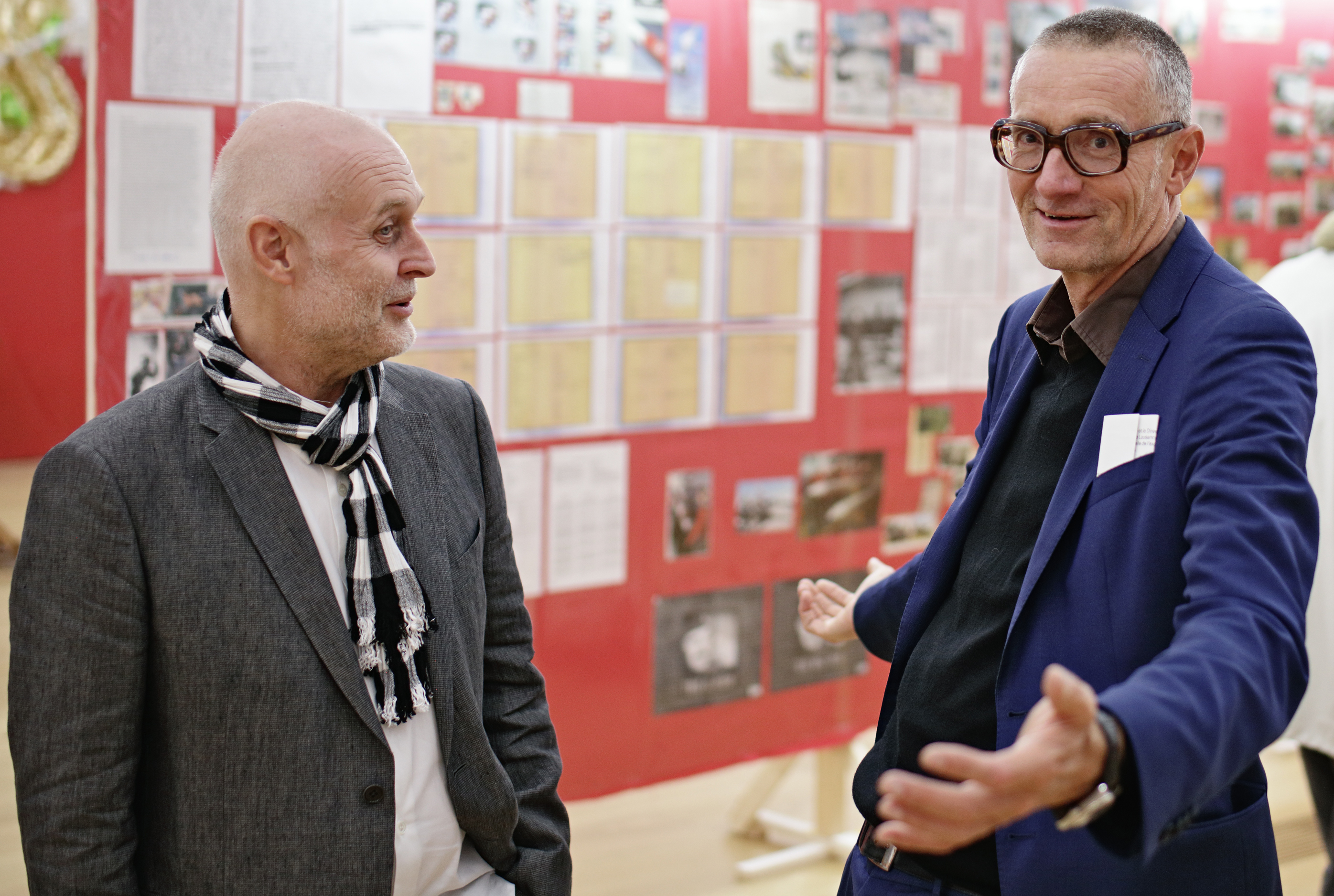
Thomas Hirschhorn presents Swiss Army Knife at the Cantonal Museum of Fine Arts, Lausanne, in the presence of its director Bernard Fibicher, on the occasion of the work's integration into the museum's permanent collection, in 2019.

Hirschhorn's works are held in collections worldwide, among which the Art Institute of Chicago; Centro de Arte Contemporanea Inhotim, Brumadinho; Colección Jumex, Mexico; Dia Art Foundation, New York; K21, Düsseldorf; Kunsthalle Mannheim; Musée national d'Art moderne - Centre Pompidou, Paris; the Museum of Modern Art, New York; Philadelphia Museum of Art; Pinakothek der Moderne, Munchen; Tate Modern, London; Walker Art Center, Minneapolis, and the Pérez Art Museum Miami, Florida, among others.

== Awards ==
Hirschhorn received the Preis für Junge Schweizer Kunst (1999), the Marcel Duchamp Prize (2000), the Rolandpreis für Kunst im öffentlichen Raum (2003), the Joseph Beuys Prize (2004), the Kurt Schwitters Prize (2011), and the Meret Oppenheim Prize (2018). In June 2011, he represented Switzerland at the Venice Biennale.

Hirschhorn was part of the jury which selected Gaëlle Choisne as winner of the Marcel Duchamp Prize in 2024.

== Bibliography ==
- Jochen Poetter (dir.), Marcus Steinweg, Thomas Hirschhorn. Rolex etc., Freundlichs "Aufstieg" und Skulptur-Sortier-Station-Dokumentation, Stuttgart, Museum Ludwig Koln, 1998 ISBN 3893224300.
- Rondeau, James (2000). Thomas Hirschhorn : Jumbo Spoons and Big Cake, the Art Institute of Chicago : Flugplatz Welt/World Airport, the Renaissance Society at the University of Chicago. Art Institute of Chicago. ISBN 0865591814.
- Buchloh, Benjamin H. D.; Gingeras, Alison M.; Basualdo, Carlos (2004). Thomas Hirschhorn. London: Phaidon Press. ISBN 07148 42737.
- Bishop, Claire; Foster, Hal; Raymond, Yasmil (2011). Thomas Hirschhorn: Establishing a Critical Corpus. Zurich: JRP-Ringier/Les Presses du réel. ISBN 978-3-03764-185-9.
- Lee, Lisa; Foster, Hal (2013). Critical Laboratory: The Writings of Thomas Hirschhorn. Cambridge: MIT Press.
- Dezeuze, Anna (2014). Thomas Hirschhorn: Deleuze Monument. London: Afterall Books. ISBN 978-1-84638-143-0.
- Carmine, Giovanni; Fluck, Léa; Gross, Samuel; Moor, Stefano; Raymond, Yasmil (2018). Prix Meret Oppenheim 2018. Bern: Federal Office of Culture. ISBN 978-3-9524712-3-4.
- Braun, Christina (2018). Thomas Hirschhorn : A New Political Understanding of Art?. Dartmouth College Press. ISBN 9781512601626.
