= Claire Bishop =

British art historian, critic, author

- Education: Cambridge University, Essex University
- Occupation: Presidential Professor of Art History at CUNY Graduate Center
- Known for: Histories and theories of participation art and performance
- Notable work: Artificial Hells: Participatory Art and the Politics of Spectatorship (2012); “Antagonism and Relational Aesthetics" (2004)

Claire Bishop is a British art historian, critic, and Presidential Professor of Art History at CUNY Graduate Center, New York where she has taught since September 2008. Bishop is known as one of the central theorists of participation in visual art and performance. Her 2004 essay titled “Antagonism and Relational Aesthetics,” which was published in October, remains an influential critique of relational aesthetics. Bishop's books have been translated into twenty languages and she is a frequent contributor to the magazine Artforum and the journal October.

== Early life and education ==
Bishop grew up on the Welsh border and attended Welshpool High School. She received a Bachelor of Arts in art history from St John's College, Cambridge in 1994 and completed her MA and Ph.D in art history and theory at Essex University in 1996 and 2002 respectively. Bishop was a tutor in critical theory in the Curating Contemporary Art department at the Royal College of Art, London from 2001 to 2006, before becoming an associate professor in the department of Art History at the University of Warwick, Coventry from 2006 to 2008.

== Career ==
Bishop's book Artificial Hells: Participatory Art and the Politics of Spectatorship (2012) is the first historical and theoretical overview of socially engaged participatory art, best known in the U.S. as "social practice." In it, Bishop follows the trajectory of twentieth-century art and examines key moments in the development of a participatory aesthetic. This Itinerary takes in Futurism and Dada; the Situationist International; Happenings in Eastern Europe, Argentina, and Paris; the 1970 Community Arts Movement; and the Artists Placement Group. It concludes with a discussion of long-term educational projects by contemporary artists such as Thomas Hirschhorn, Tania Bruguera, Pawel Althamer, and Paul Chan. Artificial Hells: Participatory Art and the Politics of Spectatorship was reviewed in a wide range of publications including Art in America, Art Journal, CAA Reviews, Art Review, Art Monthly, and TDR: The Drama Review. In 2013, Artificial Hells won the Frank Jewett Mather Prize for art criticism and the ASAP book prize.

Bishop is also the author of the short book Radical Museology, or, What's Contemporary in Museums of Contemporary Art? (2013), with drawings by Dan Perjovschi, which has been translated into Romanian, Russian, Korean, Spanish, and Italian. Her current research looks at contemporary art and performance as a way to understand the changing impact of digital technology upon attention. Part of this research was published as 'Black Box, White Cube, Gray Zone: Dance Exhibitions and Audience Attention' TDR, Summer 2018. nIn 2020 she published a book of conversations with the Cuban artist Tania Bruguera. In 2024, Bishop was awarded a Guggenheim Fellowship in Fine Arts Research.

== Selected publications ==
=== Books ===
- Installation Art: A Critical History. London: Tate, 2005. (ISBN 9780415974127)
- Artificial Hells: Participatory Art and the Politics of Spectatorship. London: Verso, 2012. (ISBN 9781844676903)
- Radical Museology, or, What's Contemporary in Museums of Contemporary Art? London: Koenig Books, 2013 (ISBN 9783863353643)
- Claire Bishop in conversation with/en conversación con Tania Bruguera, New York: Cisneros 2020
- Disordered Attention: How We Look at Art and Performance Today. London: Verso, 2024. (ISBN 978-1-80429-288-4)

=== Edited volumes ===
- Participation. London: Whitechapel/MIT Press, 2006. (ISBN 9780415974127)
- 1968-1989: Political Upheaval and Artistic Change. Co-edited with Marta Dziewanska. Warsaw: Museum of Modern Art, 2010. (ISBN 9788392404408)
- Double Agent. London: ICA, 2009.(ISBN 9781900300582)

=== Papers ===
- 'History Depletes Itself' Claire Bishop on Danh Vo at The Danish Pavilion and Punta Della Dogana at the Venice Biennale 2015, Artforum, September 2015
- 'The Perils and Possibilities of Dance in the Museum: Tate, MoMA, and Whitney', Dance Research Journal, Volume 46, Number 3, December 2014
- 'Reconstruction Era: The Anachronic Time(s) of Installation Art', When Attitudes Become Form: Bern 1969/Venice 2013, Progetto Prada Arte, Milan 2013.
- 'The Digital Divide: Contemporary Art and New Media', Artforum, September 2012.
- 'Delegated Performance: Outsourcing Authenticity', October, number 140, Spring 2012.
- 'The Social Turn: Collaboration and Its Discontents', Artforum, February 2006.
- 'Antagonism and Relational Aesthetics', October, Number 110, Fall 2004.
