= Boteka Airport =

- IATA: none; ICAO: FZGT

Summary
- Serves: Boteka, Democratic Republic of the Congo
- Elevation AMSL: 380 m (1,250 ft)
- Coordinates: 00°19′00″S 019°04′00″E

Map
- Location of airport in the Democratic Republic of the Congo

Runways
Direction	Length		Surface
Direction	m	ft	Surface
	930	3,051
- Source: Great Circle Mapper

Boteka Airport (ICAO: FZGT) is an airport serving Boteka, Democratic Republic of the Congo.
