= Boteka =

Village in the Democratic Republic of the Congo

- Town
- Location in Democratic Republic of the Congo
- Coordinates: 0°23′57″S 19°5′55″E
- Country: DR Congo
- Province: Équateur
- Territory: Ingende
- Sector: Duali

Population (2019)
  - Total: 3,500

Boteka (also known as Flandria or Frandria) is a settlement in the Province of Équateur in the Democratic Republic of the Congo. The village is served by Boteka Airport.

== History ==
The village is noted for its abandoned plantation of the same name.

== Economy ==
The village is the home to a plantation owned by Plantation et Huilerie du Congo (PHC) in which plan oil is harvested from oil palms.

Even though it is at the heart of a palm oil plantation, finding palm oil in the local market is rare.

== Infrastructure ==
Due to have limited land for cultivation, it is difficult to get a different variety of foods, besides cassava and its leaves to make kwanga.
