= René Ngongo =

Congolese biologist and political activist

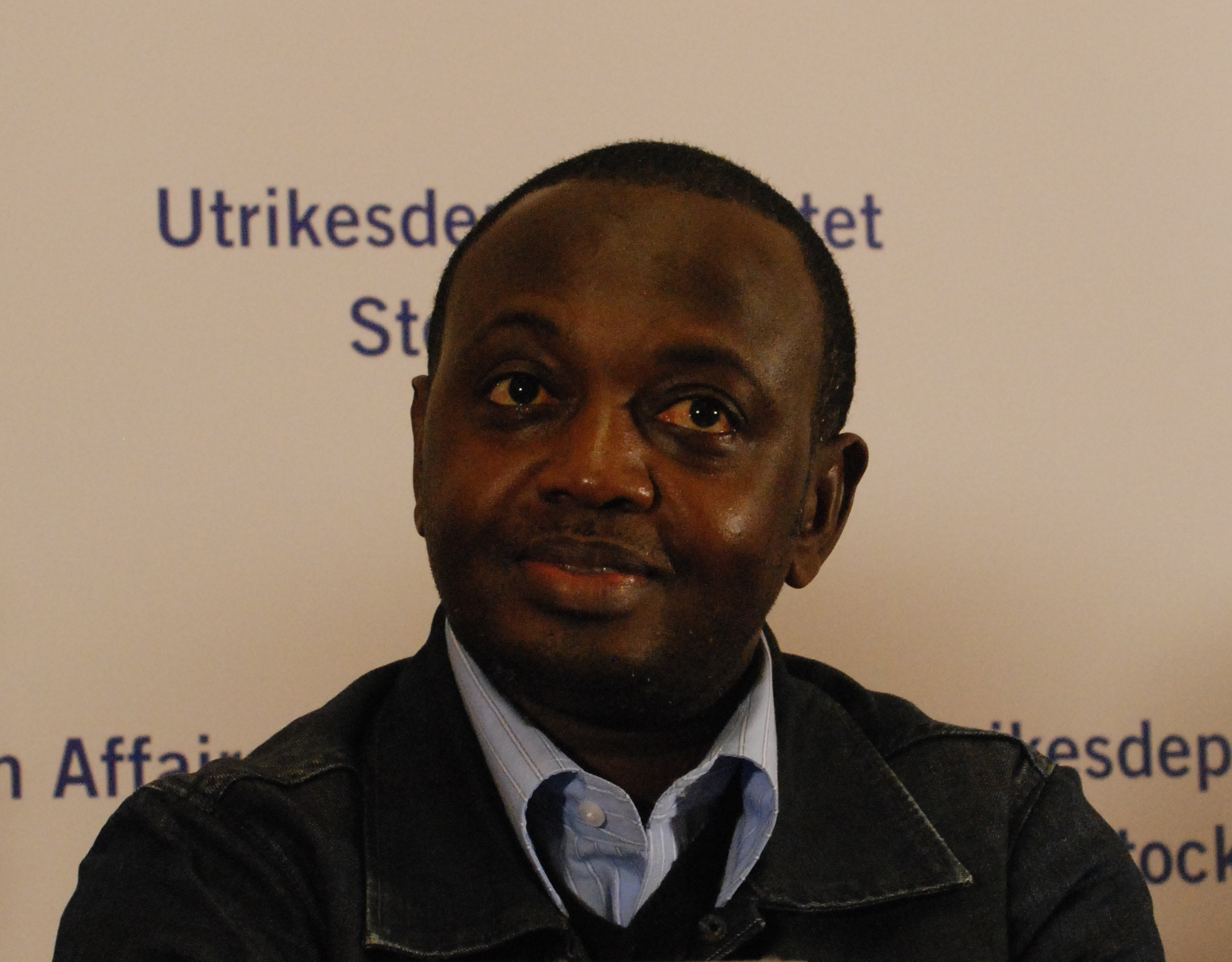
- Ngongo in 2009
- Born: October 1961 (age 64–65); Goma, Republic of the Congo
- Education: University of Kisangani
- Occupations: biologist; environmentalist
- Awards: In 2009, René Ngongo received the Right Livelihood Award

René Ngongo (born October 1961 in Goma, Republic of the Congo) is a Congolese biologist, environmentalist and political activist. Ngongo graduated from the University of Kisangani with a bachelor's degree in biology in 1987. In 1994, he created the NGO OCEAN (Organisation Concertée des Ecologistes et Amis de la Nature) in order to protect the DRC's natural resources.

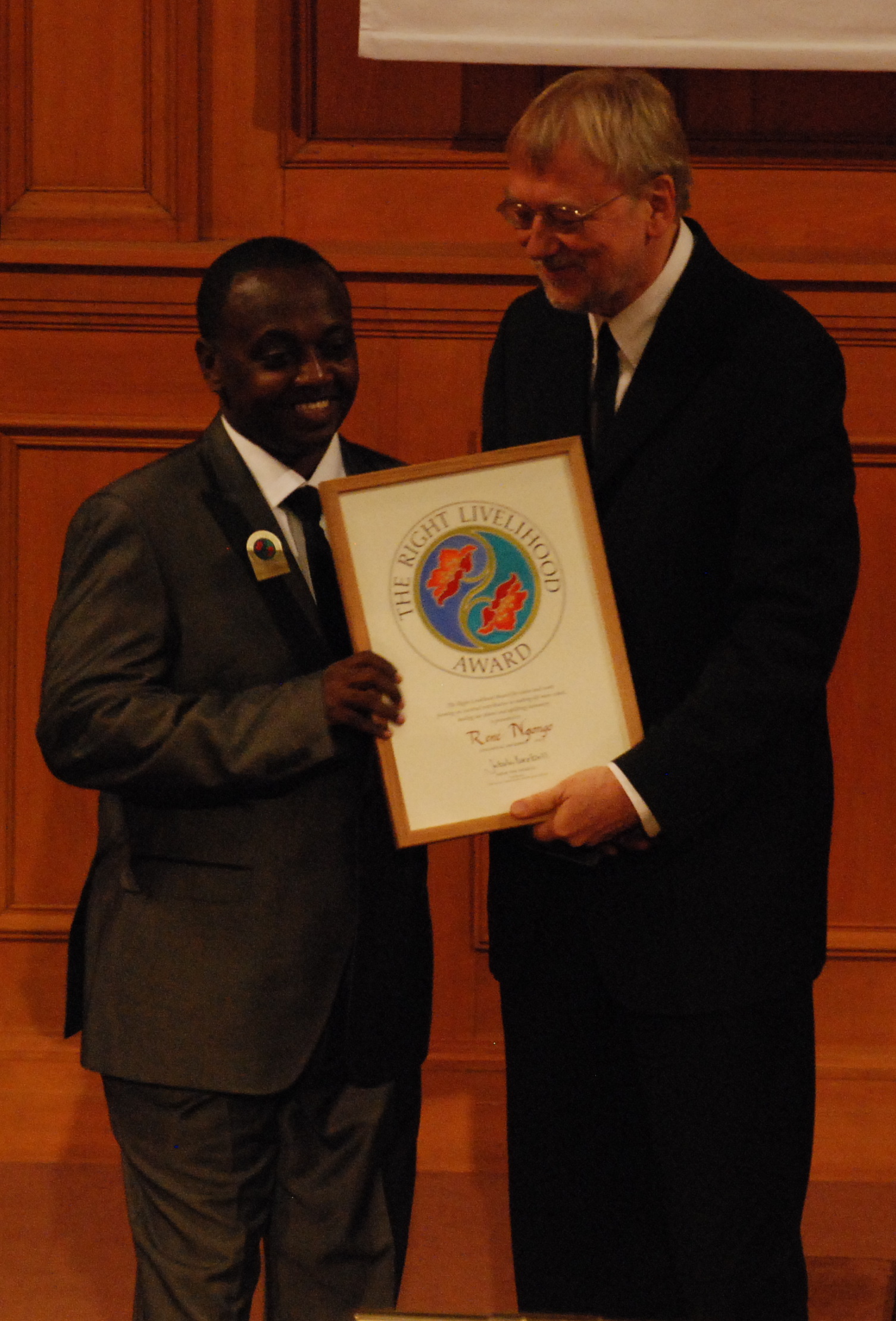
René Ngongo receives the Right Livelihood Award

In 2009, René Ngongo received the Right Livelihood Award "for his courage in confronting the forces that are destroying the Congo’s rainforests and building political support for their conservation and sustainable use”.

== See also ==
- Wildlife of the Democratic Republic of the Congo
