= Marcus Steinweg =

German philosopher based in Berlin (born 1971)

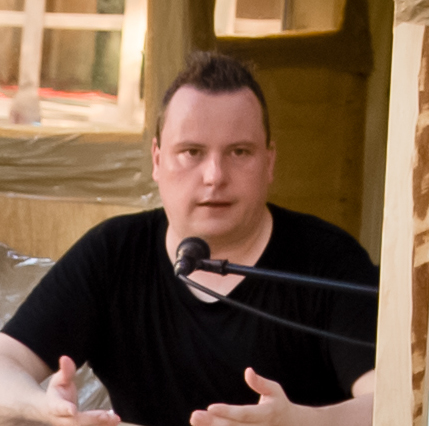
Steinweg delivering a philosophy lecture at Thomas Hirschorn's Gramsci Monument in 2013

Marcus Steinweg (born 1971, in Koblenz) is a German philosopher based in Berlin. His speciality is working between the fields of art and philosophy. He is an editor of the journal Inaesthetics.

== Biography ==
Steinweg has worked on collaborations with artists such as Thomas Hirschhorn and Rosemarie Trockel. In 2011 he curated the exhibition “Kunst und Philosophie” (Art and Philosophy) at the Neue Berliner Kunstverein. He has given numerous talks, published many texts and participated in art exhibitions.

== Book publications ==
- Bataille Maschine, Berlin: Merve Verlag 2003
- Subjektsingularitäten, Berlin: Merve Verlag 2004
- Behauptungsphilosophie, Berlin: Merve Verlag 2006
- Duras (with Rosemarie Trockel), Berlin: Merve Verlag 2008
- Politik des Subjekts, Zürich-Berlin: Diaphanes Verlag 2009
- Aporien der Liebe, Berlin: Merve Verlag 2010
- Kunst und Philosophie / Art and Philosophy, Cologne: Verlag der Buchhandlung Walther König 2012
- The Terror of Evidence: MIT Press 2017 (Evidenzterror: Matthes & Seitz Berlin 2015)
- Inconsistencies: MIT Press 2017 (Inkonsistenzen: Matthes & Seitz Berlin 2015)
- Fetzen - Für eine Philosophie der Entschleierung (with Marie Rotkopf), Matthes & Seitz, Berlin, 2022

== Projects with Thomas Hirschhorn ==
- Nietzsche Map (2003)
- Hannah Arendt Map (2003)
- Foucault-Map (2004)
- The Map of Friendship between Art and Philosophy (2007)
- Spinoza Map (2007)
- The Map of Headlessness (2011)
