= List of Ivorian artists =

The following list of Ivorian artists (in alphabetical order by last name) includes artists of various genres, who are notable and are either born in Ivory Coast, of Ivorian descent or who produce works that are primarily about Ivory Coast.

== A ==
- Aboudia (born 1983), also known as Abdoulaye Diarrassouba, Ivorian-born American contemporary artist

== B ==
- Frédéric Bruly Bouabré (1923–2014), also known as Cheik Nadro, draftsperson
- Jems Robert Koko Bi (born 1966), sculptor, installation artist
- Armand Boua (born 1978), painter

== C ==
- Joana Choumali (born 1974), photographer

== D ==
- Charles Dago, photographer
- Ananias Leki Dago, photographer
- Claudie Titty Dimbeng (born 1968), Ivorian-born French abstract painter

== F ==
- Pierre Fakhoury (born 1943), Ivorian-born sculptor, of Lebanese descent
- Franck Abd-Bakar Fanny (1970–2021), photographer

== G ==
- GauZ' (born 1971), also known as Armand Gauz, photographer
- Emile Guebehi, sculptor

== H ==
- James Houra (1952–2020), painter

== K ==
- Dorris Haron Kasco (born 1966), photographer
- Paul Kodjo (1939–2021), photographer
- Laetitia Ky, artist, hair sculptor

== L ==
- Christian Lattier, sculptor

== M ==
- Loza Maléombho, fashion designer
- Mathile Moraeau, painter

== O ==
- Valérie Oka (1967–2023), artist
- O'Plérou, graphic designer, illustrator

== S ==
- Malick Sidibé (1935–2016), photographer
- Paul Sika, photographer

== W ==
- Ouattara Watts, painter

== See also ==
- List of Ivorians
