= Culture of Ivory Coast =

The diverse culture of Ivory Coast, a coastal West African country bordered by Ghana, Liberia, Mali, Burkina Faso, and Guinea, is exemplified by a multitude of ethnic groups, events, festivals, music, and art.

More than sixty indigenous ethnic groups are often cited, although this number may be reduced to seven clusters of ethnic groups, by classifying small units together on the basis of their cultural and historical characteristics, which differ somewhat from one to the next. These may be further reduced to four major cultural regions – the East Atlantic (primarily Akan), West Atlantic (primarily Kru), Voltaic, and Mandé – differentiated in terms of environment, economic activity, language, and overall cultural characteristics. In the southern half of the country, the East Atlantic and West Atlantic cultures, separated by the Bandama River, each make up almost one-third of the indigenous population. Roughly one-third of the indigenous population lives in the north, including Voltaic peoples in the northeast and Mandé in the northwest.

== Ethnic groups ==
The population of Ivory Coast includes more than sixty ethnic groups, commonly grouped into broader ethnolinguistic categories, including Akan, Kru, Gur, and Mande peoples. Major ethnic groups include the Baoulé, Bété, Dioula, Dan, and Senufo.

Several groups in southern and central Ivory Coast, including the Abron, Akye, Anye, Aowin, and Baoulé, are part of the Akan group.

Languages spoken in Ivory Coast include Akan languages such as Akye, Anyi, Aowin, Baule, and Bono Twi, as well as Dan, a Mande language.

== Art ==
Among the Akan-speaking people of southern Ghana and adjacent Ivory Coast, ritual pottery and figurative terracottas are used in connection with funeral practices that date at least to the 17th century.

The Baoule create art in several different media, including gold and brass casting (similar to their Asante ancestors), wooden sculptures, and mask and figure carving such as wooden masks. The mask is a primary art form in the Ivory Coast. Baoule sculpture or masks are hidden from the public if the item holds high importance. Sacred sculptures are not raised off the floor and are covered in cloth. These sacred objects such as the Goli Glin Mask can potentially harm a person if looked at.

Woodcarving, pottery, and weaving are all art forms of the Akye. The stools carved are seen as “seats of power” and akuaba (wooden dolls) are associated with fertility. The traditions of pottery and weaving are extensive and long lasting throughout the Akan people. Woven on behalf of royalty, Kente cloth has come to symbolize African power all over the world.

Funerary images and monuments hold special importance among the Anye people; artistic expression is focused on creating such art forms, as the beauty of the monument is seen to reflect the depth of respect for the deceased. Through these types of grave monuments, dedicated to the ancestors, families can demonstrate their affluence and dedication at the same time.

Much of the Senufo's sculpted work is made in the poro, or school. Brass sculptures, wood carvings, and masks are mostly made there, and sold to local artisans. They are expert mask makers, but since farming is the highest profession possible, artists and musicians are low in the caste system (musicians are bottom).

Art and music are enormous parts of Dan culture. The primary art form of the Dan is their masks, which emulate virtually every aspect of Dan society. Dan sculptors use masks to represent war, peace, social regulation, and entertainment. Mancala game boards and stylized wooden spoons are also made with wood carving.

Contemporary art is well developed in Ivory Coast. Some of the major artists are:

- Ananias Leki Dago (photographer, 1970): Winner of the First Prize of PhotoAfrica context in Spain in 2009, and Distinction Award from the Critical Photography French Kodak Price in 2004
- Christian Lattier (sculptor, 1925–1978): Winner of the grand prize of "World Festival of Black Arts" in Dakar. 19 pieces of Lattier's sculptures are currently in the collection of the Musée National de Ivory Coast in Abidjan.
- Yacouba Konaté (curator, writer, art critic, professor of philosophy, 1953): In 2000, he served as a Director of the National Institute of Arts and Culture, and as a Director of the Cabinet of Ministers of Culture and Francophony. He is also head of l'Institut national supérieur des Arts et de l'action culturelle of Abidjan. He was one of the curators of individual exhibitions of 6th Dak'Art in 2004, and he was the artistic director of the Dakar Biennale in 2006.
- Jems Robert Koko Bi (sculptor, 1966)
- Ernest Dükü (Painter, 1958): Dükü is an artist who have engaged in dialogue with the rich systems of graphic inscription and writing of Africa but his result are highly individual, his work ask the cosmogonical world system, the spiritual systems; by using his training in architecture may explain the volume and dimensionality that situates his works somewhere between painting and sculpture.
- Ouattara Watts (painter, 1957): Watts is an internationally recognized neo-expressionist painter. Watts is a jazz enthusiast, who merged music and art in paintings and collages, by using recycled everyday materials.
- Paul Sika (fashion and advertising photographer/creative director/artist, 1985)
- Mathilde Moraeau (painter): Director of the Ecole Nationale des Beaux Arts in Abidjan
- Sidiki Bakaba (actor, scenario writer, director, 1949): Awarded for his entire career in 2nd Pan-African Cultural Festival in Algiers in 2009, and Best Actor for West Africa by la Fondation des artistes de Ivory Coast (FONDACI) in 2008
- Frédéric Bruly Bouabré (painter, 1923, 2013): Many of his paintings are in the collection of Jean Pigozzi

== Dance ==
Djéla lou Zaouli is a dance performed among Gouro communities. It is a spiritual dance that records the past present and future through their depiction of historical events. It is performed as a connection to their spiritual realm. The dance originated from a myth of the origins of Zaouli.

== Events and festivals ==
The Fêtes des Masques, (Festival of Masks) held in December in the region of Man is one of Ivory Coast's biggest and best-known festivals. Competitions between villages are held to find the best dancers, and to pay homage to the forest spirits embodied in the elaborate masks. Another important event is the week-long carnival in Bouaké each March.

In April, there is the Fête du Dipri

The primary Muslim holiday is Ramadan, a month when everyone fasts between sunrise and sunset, following the fourth pillar of Islam. Ramadan ends with a huge feast, Eid al-Fitr, where everyone prays, visits friends, gives presents and eat together.

== Cuisine ==
The traditional diet in Ivory Coast is very similar to that of neighboring countries in its reliance on grains and tubers, but Ivorians have a particular kind of small, open-air restaurant called a maquis that is unique to them. Attiéké (grated cassava) is a popular Ivorian side dish.

Maquis normally feature braised chicken and fish smothered in onions and tomatoes, served with attiéké, or kedjenou, a chicken dish made with vegetables and a mild sauce. One of the tastiest street-vended foods is aloko, which is a ripe plantain fried in palm oil, spiced with steamed onions and chili, and eaten alone or with grilled fish. Bangui is a local palm wine.

== Religion ==
The Senufo are a very animistic society; they believe that the ancestor spirits are responsible for all events that occur, and if they are not appeased through proper ritual they may cause drought, infertility, and illness.

Ancestor worship and a hierarchy of nature gods make up the religious beliefs of the Baule. Alouroua is the creator god, and though other nature spirits and spouses are represented in sculpture, Alouroua is never physically manifested in art. Other religion are also adopted in Ivory Coast. We have Christianity and Islam.

The Akan believe in an ultimate God, who has various different names depending on the different regions of worship. At one point, according to Akan mythology, this God walked upon the earth with man, but moved high up into the sky after being continuously beaten with a pestle of an old woman pounding fufu. No priests serve him directly, and the general belief is that he cannot be contacted directly. Priests do, however, serve other spirits, acting as a conduit of the gods, a liaison between them and mankind. There are numerous other gods (abosom), usually connected to the natural world, like ocean and river spirits, as well as a variety of local spirits who receive their power from this supreme god. The earth itself is considered a deity, and a female one by the Abron called Asaase Yaa, directly connected to fertility and fruitfulness. Prayer is held daily, and includes offerings to ancestors and spirits.

Ancestors and ancestor worship are at the center of the Anyi's religious beliefs. One should always remember and honor one's ancestors, and strive to live life so that, in turn, as an ancestor one will be revered and remembered. In keeping with this system, when a person passes, there is an elaborate ceremony with ritual washing, dressing the dead in fine clothes and gold jewelry, and a mourning period allowing the family to show respect for departed and to allow a safe passage and welcome for the deceased into the spirit world.

The Dan world view holds that everything can be divided into two separate and clear categories. The primary dichotomy is between village and bush, in other words, things that have been controlled by man and things that have not. Crossing over the dividing line is dangerous business, and whenever it is done, whether to clear new fields or simply crossing the forest, the bush spirits must be appeased. In order to take part in village life, the bush spirits must take corporeal form. The Dan believe that all creatures have a spirit soul (du), which is imparted onto humans and animals from the creator god, Xra, through birth. One's du is immortal and is passed on after death to a new being. However, some du remain bodiless. They inhabit the forests as bush spirits and must establish a relationship with a person if they wish to be manifested and honored. Often the spirit will request the chosen person to dance the spirit, utilizing a mask to illustrate the spirit's embodiment.

== Music ==
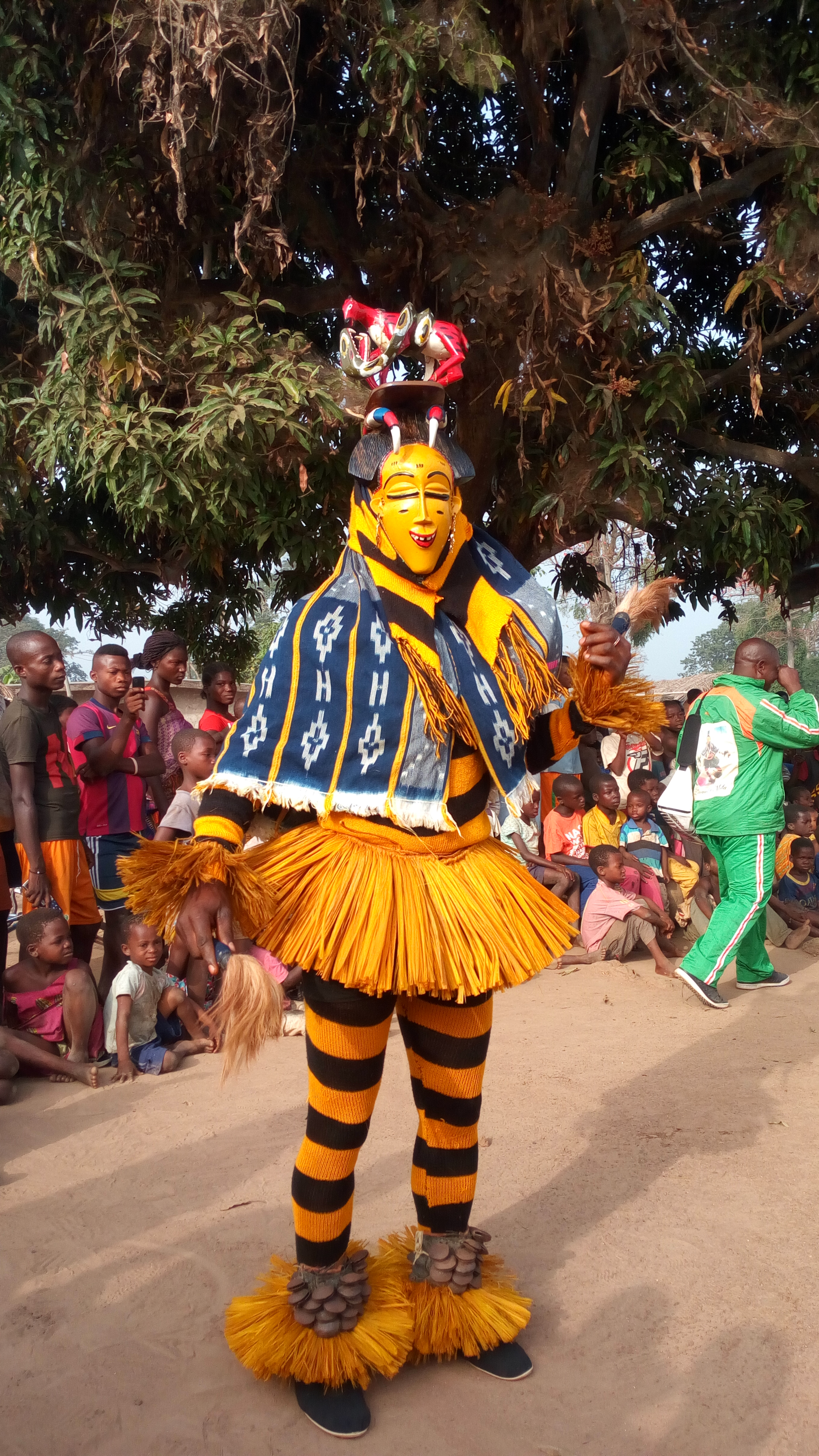
Zaouli Performer

The traditional music style of many of the ethnic groups of Ivory Coast is characterized by a series of rhythms and melodies that occur simultaneously, without one dominating the other. Music is used in many aspects of the culture; the Dan celebrate rice, death, marriage, birth, and weather all with music. Instruments include the Talking drum, djembe, Kpalogo, Shekere (Youroo), Akombe, and cleavers, and are typically made with local materials, such as gourds, animal skins, and horns. In the past, music has been the main forté of one social group, the griot (village entertainers). Ivory Coast's Alpha Blondy, the world-famous reggae artist, is probably the country's best known singer, though his music is not necessarily representative. Masks are a prevalent art form in Ivory Coast. The variety and intricacy of masks created by the people of Ivory Coast is rivaled by none. Masks have many purposes. They are used mostly for representative reasons; they can symbolize lesser deities, the souls of the deceased, and even caricatures of animals. They are considered sacred and very dangerous; as such, only certain powerful individuals and families are permitted to own them, and only specially-trained individuals may wear the masks. It is held to be dangerous for others to wear ceremonial masks, because it is believed that each mask has a soul, or life force, and that when a person's face comes in contact with the inside of the mask, the person is transformed into the entity the mask represents. The Baoulé, the Dan (or Yacouba) and the Senoufo are all known for their wooden carvings.

== Economy ==
Markets, run primarily by women, are the center of the Baule local economy. Yams and some maize are the primary crops. They also export cocoa and koala nuts, using exploited migrant laborers (mostly from Burkina Faso) on local plantations. Crops such as maize, peppers, sweet potatoes, peanuts, tomatoes, manioc, and squash were introduced from the Americas during the Atlantic slave trade. They raise farm animals, like sheep, goats, dogs, and chickens. Their craft items and local produce are sold along with imported goods all over the world.

Along the coast of the Ivory Coast, fishing is very important, as the depleted forests hold little promise for hunting. The markets are run mostly by women who as a result hold a large amount of economic power, while the men fish, hunt, and clear land. Both participate in agricultural tasks.

Anyi agricultural economy revolves around banana and taro production. Yams are also an important staple crop in the region. Palm oil is also sold as a commodity at the international market.

The tradition of tin is still an essential part of the Dan economy today. Young people strive to make a name for themselves by lavishly spending at community feasts to demonstrate their wealth. Although farming and hunting have been largely replaced by laboring in the diamond camps or working at the rubber plantations, the establishment of a hierarchical social order is still based on the individual's ability to succeed.

The Senufo are known as excellent farmers, and are mainly a farming society. They live by a strict caste system, where the farmer is top and the musicians are at the bottom, everyone else filling in between. One of the highest possible honors given in the Senefo culture is the title of sambali (champion cultivator), who is respected throughout the region and in his old age is typically given a strong leadership role. Even for those who do not belong to the farmer caste, farming is huge in the Senefo culture. The society is very community centered; people often take turns working each other's lands, trading off and on. There is usually a group in each village made up of men from ages 15 to 35, who are in charge of working in the fields and providing a huge festival during the dry season. To make farming and chores fun, local games to see how fast a man can hoe a field are held. Another society for men is the poro, or school for young men, usually located in the forest. For Senefo women, the greatest ability is the ability to cook well; if a woman or girl cannot, it is a shame to the family. The women's society, sandogo, is responsible mainly for divination.

== Political systems ==
The Anyi live in loose, spread out neighborhoods of family housing complexes, usually with a headman, directed by a Council of Elders who represents the town in regional politics. The Anyi, like other Akan people, have a highly stratified society including a hierarchical political administration made up of officials with rank and power. Since the Anyi are matrilineal, women have relatively high social status in both the political and economic areas.

It has been only recently, through the creation of the leopard society (go), that a unifying political organization has emerged among the Dan. The secret political society centers around the powerful spirit go, who is responsible for peacemaking. Although the power of go seems to be increasing throughout Dan society, individual villages still maintain a high degree of political independence, and the economic power of the individual is still highly valued.

The Baule government is highly centralized; there is a king or chief on top, who inherits his position, along with various subchiefs in charge of local populations. All rely on political advisors who aid in the making of decisions. The primary mask association, The Goli, provides social order among the Baule.

Royal membership among Akan is determined through connection to the land. Anyone who traces descent from a founding member of a village or town may be considered royal. Each family is responsible for maintaining political and social order within its confines.

== History ==
Gouro also known as Kweni is a region of the Ivory Coast located in regions along the Bandama River.

The Senufo are made up of a number of different groups who migrated south to Mali and the Ivory Coast in the 15th and 16th centuries.

Oral traditions describe the Dan society of the 19th century as lacking any central governing power. Social cohesion was fostered by a shared language and a preference for intermarriage. Generally, each village had a headman who had earned his position of advantage in the community through hard work in the fields and through luck as a hunter. They usually surrounded themselves with young warriors for protection from invading neighbors and exchanged gifts with other chiefs in order to heighten their own prestige. Out of this custom was born the basic tradition of tin among the Dan, which was based on displaying one's success in order to build a good reputation and name.

The Baoule are a part of the Akan people who inhabit Ivory Coast and Ghana. The Baule migrated westward from Ghana when the Asante rose to power. This tale of their breakaway is preserved in their oral traditions. During the Asante rise to power, the Baule queen, Aura Poku, was competing directly with the Asante king. When she lost, she led the Baule away from Ghana and to the Central Ivory Coast. Aura Poku's descendant occupies the throne and palace she built, and is honored by the Baule as their nominal king.

Much of what we know about ancient Akan customs comes to us in the form of oral histories which have survived for several hundred years. Many of the objects that have been recovered through archaeological methods are still produced in modified form among Akan people today. The rise of the early Akan centralized state can be traced to the 11th century, which is the Bono state, and is likely related to the opening of trade routes established to move gold throughout the region. It was not until the end of the 17th century, however, that the grand Asante Kingdom emerged in the southern forest region of Ghana, when several small states united under the King of Kumasi in a move to achieve political freedom from the Denkyira.

A subgroup of the Akan, the Anyi people migrated to the Ivory Coast from Ghana between the 16th and 18th centuries. They were never quite as powerful as the Asante and Baule, and as a result were indirectly under their respective rules at the height of both empires. The Baule Empire that rose up from 1720 between the Bandama and the Comoe Rivers was the result of Family feud that arose between the then Queen Mother of Asante Nana Abenaa Pokua during the death of Nana Osei Tutu I and Her GrandNephew Nana Opoku Ware I who assassinated his Grand Uncle Nana Darko, the brother of Nana Abena Pokua. This incident brought about the civil war that engulfed the Asante Kingdom between 1717 and 1720 The incident split the Kingdom into two and the then united Oyoko-Dako Clan were also divided. The Oyokos who were the nephews of the Adakos, headed by Opoku Ware, kept control of Oyoko clan and the Golden Stool, whereas Nana Abena Pokua the QueenMother moved to Kaase (then Kwaman) with her partisans numbering about 3.5 million half the population of Asante moved and settled with the Anyi, Nzema and the Sanhwi to the west of Asante. Nana Opoku Ware was entooled as Asantehene and his mother Nana Nyarko Kusi Amoa, the niece of Nana Abena Pokua was also entooled as the Queen mother of Asante in 1720.

Between 1720 and 1730 Nana Abena Pokua, faced with many obstacles, confronted life with determination, living among the Nzima/Anyi and Safwi, She adopted their language and even changed her name from Abena Pokuaa to Abla Poku thus delinking any ties with Asante. Nana Abla Pokou in order to cross the River Comoe to escape the partisans of Opoku Ware who were sent to return the partisans of Nana Pokou back into the Asante Kingdom, had to sacrifice her son to the River Comoe before they were able to cross the river with her partisans. After crossing the River Comoe Nana Abla Pokou and her various warrior Groups started to settle each to ts location. The Kyidom warriors (Akye) settled immediately after the river Comoe to guide the route to Asante. They kept the Golden UMBRELLA and the sword of Nana Osei Tutu. The Abbe (Torchbearers) also settled after the Akye and the Mbatto, Ebrie and all the other foot Soldiers settled in the regions that is today Akan land in Ivory Coast.

In accordance to Akan tradition, after the consolidation of the new Kingdom, after meeting fierce resistance from the defeated former Lords of the Akan, the Denkyira; Nana Abena Pokua defeated them in war and subdued them and thereby established the Baule Kingdom. By 1730 Nana Abla Powas entooled as the First Reigning Queen of the New Akan Kingdom of Baule after the death of Nana Osei Tutu I. thereby with the stools of Obiri Yeboah and DENKYIRA UNDER THE CONTROL OF THE NEW KINGDOM, Nana Poukou established Baule Dakon Clan as the undisputed leader and Ruler of the Akans. Below are the Ruling Akan Rulers who ruled after the death of Nana Osei Tutu I, King of the Asantes and the Baules.

Beretuo Dynasty 1717 to 1720 Amaniampon, the Mamponghene Regent, Mamponghene became regent due to the assassination of Nana Dako during the contest for the Succession to the throne after the death of King Osei Tutu the civil that ensued lasted for 3 years 1717–1720 that led to the migration of Nana Abena Pokua and the Adako Dynasty to Cote d’lvoire and the founding of the Baule Kingdom.

ADAKO ROYAL Dynasty Obaahemaa Nana Abena Pokua BAULE Confederation

1720–1730 nation building Founded the Baule Kingdom That covered all the Akans in Cote d’lvoire.

1730 to 1760 NANA ABENAA POKUAA (ABLA POKU) AWURAPOKU.)
1760 to 1790 NANA AKUA BONI
1790 to 1840 NANA KOUAME TUTU
1840 to 1870 NANA KOUAKOU ANOUGBLE I
1870 to 1880 NANA TUTU DIBI (TUTU YEMAN)
1880 to 1890 NANA ANOUBGLE DEIKYE
1890 to 1902 NANA KOUAME GUIE (AGYEI)
1902 to 1925 NANA KOUADIO NDRI
1925 to 1958 NANA KOUAKOU ANOUGBLE 11
1958 to 1978 NANA KOUAME GUIE
1958 to 1993 NANA HOUPHOUET BOIGNY governed as Akan king and President
1993 to 2004 Nana Jean Baptist Kouame was nominated and enstooled as regent Nana Osei Tutu Anougble III Regent of the Baoule
1993 to Present Odomankoma Akoa Nana Baffour Gyanko Fofie was entooled as supreme head of Adako RoyalDynasty
1999 to Present Nana Baffour Gyanko Fofie I Nominated The Adako Akan Baule Monarch Awaiting Coronation when Peace and Calm Returns to the Nation.

== See also ==
- Languages of Ivory Coast
- Sandobele
- Korhogo cloth
- Ivorian cuisine
