= Yacouba Konaté =

Ivoirian curator and academic

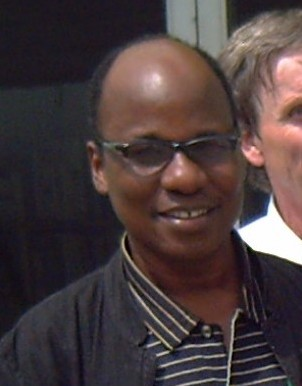
- Born: 4 May 1953 (age 73); Ivory Coast
- Education: University of Paris 1 Pantheon-Sorbonne
- Known for: Curator, writer, art critic, professor

Yacouba Konaté (born 4 May 1953) is an Ivorian curator, writer and art critic. He is a professor of philosophy at the Université de Cocody in Abidjan, Ivory Coast.

== Career ==
He is a member of l'Académie des Arts, des Sciences et des Cultures d'Afrique et des Diasporas in Abidjan and he leads the Africa Office of the Jean Paul Blachère's Foundation.

In 1998, he was Fulbright Professor at Stanford University, between 2004 and 2008, he taught at l'École des hautes études en sciences sociales in France. In 2007, he taught at the Laval University in Canada and in 2007, he was a Carter Fellow at the University of Florida, Gainesville.

In 2008, he became the president of the International Association of Art Critics (AICA).

He is expert on the cultural development of "European Union".

In 2000, he served as a Director of the National Institute of Arts and Culture and as a Director of the Cabinet of Ministers of Culture and Francophony. He is also head of the l'Institut national supérieur des Arts et de l'action culturelle of Abidjan.

He was one of the curators of individual exhibitions of 6th Dak'Art (7 May – 7 June 2004 ) with Ivo Mesquita and Hans Ulrich Obrist. In 2006, he was the artistic director of the Dakar Biennale.

== Exhibitions ==
- "Africa, Assume Art Position!" (12/11/2010-30 January 2011) Primo Marella Gallery, Milano, 2010. A group exhibition of artists included: Mounir Fatmi, Cameron Platter, Soly Cissé, Barthélémy Toguo, Abdoulaye Konaté, Joel Andrianomearisoa, Peter Eastman, Nandipha Mntambo, Moridja Kitenge Banza, Stuart Bird, Athi Patra Ruga, Vitshios Mwilambwe Bondo
- "AfriqueEurope: Reves croises" (14/11- 10/12/2007), Ateliers des Tanneurs, Brussels, Belgium. A group exhibition of artists included: El Anatsui, Nu Barreto, El Berry Bickle and Luis Basto, Frédéric Bruly Bouabré, Dilomprizulike, Mustapha Dime, EL Loko, Tapfuma Gutsa, Annie Haloba, Jak Katarikawe, Jems Robert Koko Bi, Abdoulaye Konate, Bill Kouelany, Siriki Ky, Ndary Lo, Toyin Loye, Churchill Madikida, Joel Mpah Dooh, Francis Mampuya, IngridMwangiRobertHutter, Serigne Niang, Babacar Niang, Samuel Olou, Freddy Tsimba, and Guy Bertrand Wouété.
- Abidjan International Exhibition of Visual Arts (May 2001)
- Willie Bester Exhibition in Brussels (April 2001)
- 2001 Foire Internationale Africaine Des Arts Plastiques (FIAAP)
- "Afrique á jour" Exhibition in Lille (September 2000)
- "South Meets West" Exhibition in Accra and Bern (December 1999 and June 2000)
- "Africa Africa: Vibrant New Art from a Dynamic Continent" (11/9–24 November 1998) curated by Rajae Benchemsi, Rob Burnet, Yacouba Konaté, Toshio Shimizu, Jean-Hubert Martin, Tobu Museum of Art, Tokyo

== Publications ==
- Yacouba Konaté, Alpha Blondy: reggae et société en Afrique noire, CEDA, 1987. ISBN 2-86394-134-8
- Yacouba Konaté, Christian Lattier, Le sculpteur aux mains nues, Edition Sépia, 1993. ISBN 2-907888-23-4
- Yacouba Konaté, La Biennale de Dakar. Pour une esthétique de la création africaine contemporaine. Tête à tête avec Adorno, L'Harmattan, Paris, 2009, ISBN 978-2-296-09645-5
- Yacouba Konatè, Cote D'Ivoire Contrastes, Hardcover, Publisher: Edipress; First edition 1991, Language: French, 128 pages, ASIN: B000BNKT6Q
- Yacouba Konatè, Sacrifices dans la ville. Le citadin chez le devin, Editions Douga, Abidjan 1990.

== See also ==
- Contemporary African Art
- Culture of Ivory Coast

== Bibliography ==
- Croquis de frontières, profils de passeurs. L'art contemporain en perspective, Bâle, Ed. Centre d'études africaines cop. 2009, 45 p, foto's; 24 cm, ISBN 3-643-80003-7, ISBN 978-3-643-80003-9
- Marc Le Pape, Claudine Vidal, Côte d'Ivoire: l'année terrible, 1999–2000, KARTHALA Editions, 2002. ISBN 2-84586-317-9
- Magiciens de la Terre : l'étrange destin africain d'une exposition mondiale, in Trente ans du Centre Georges Pompidou, Paris, Centre Pompidou, 2007
- Musées en Afrique: esthétique du désenchantement, in Revue Africultures, n° 70, Paris, 2007 (in French)[]
- Africains sur le marché mondial de l'art in Revue Esprit, Vues d'Afrique, Paris, August–September 2005, pp. 91–100 (in French)
- Côte d'Ivoire: Le canari d'eau de Jacques Chirac , in Politique Africaine n° 97, Ed Karthala, Paris, April 2005 (in French)
- Zeina, Fodé et Yanguiné. Flash sur des jeunes gens en désespérance in Débats, Courrier d'Afrique de l'Ouest, n°6 et 7, Abidjan, Inades, juillet 2003, pp. 55–60. Détresse morale et sociale de quelques segments de la jeunesse africaine (in French)
- Les enfants de la balle. De la FESCI aux mouvements des jeunes patriotes In Politique Africaine, n° 89, Ed Karthala, mars 2003, pp. 49–70 (in French)
- Génération Zouglou , in Cahiers d'études africaines (Editions de l'Ecole des Hautes Etudes en Sciences Sociales, Paris, 2003 (in French)
- Le destin d'Alassane Dramane Ouattara in Côte d'Ivoire. L'année terrible. 2000–2001, Ed Karthala, Paris, 2002, pp. 253–308
- Faire ou ne pas faire nègre. Pour une critique d'art démasquée In the book Histoire de 50 ans de l'Association Internationale des critiques d'Art/AICA Ed. Aica Press, Paris, 2002. pp 65–72.
- Art contemporain africain et nouvelles identités, in Dak'Art 2002. 57th Contemporary Art Biennial (Dakar, La biennale des arts, 2002) pp. 135–138 Pourquoi certains artistes d'Afrique récusent-ils le label d'artiste africain ?
- Article entitled "Pluralité des normes de légitimité et comportements politiques", in the book of Inégalités et politiques publiques en Afrique. Pluralité des normes et jeux d'acteurs, Karthala, IRD, Paris, 2001, pp. 163–180, ISBN 2-84586-141-9
- Article entitled Quand le monde s'éveillera à la danse africaine In FAMA, Body in Difference, Dance. Laudeshaupstadt, Munchen, Kulturreferat, 2000, pp. 24–27. Festival de la Nouvelle Danse, Montréal in 28 September – 2 October 1999.
- Sous la direction de Yacouba Konaté. Etat et société civile en Afrique. Actes du colloque interdisciplinaire sur Etat et société civile en Afrique, Université d'Abidjan-Cocody, 13–18.July.1998. Revue QUEST. Groningen. Pays-Bas, 1999.
