= Jems Robert Koko Bi =

Ivorian sculptor

- Born: 1966 (age 59–60); Sinfra, Ivory Coast
- Education: Institut national supérieur des arts et de l'action culturelle (INSAAC), Kunstakademie Düsseldorf
- Known for: Sculptor, installation artist

Jems Robert Koko Bi (born 1966) is an Ivorian sculptor, and installation artist.

== Life and career ==
Jems Robert Koko Bi was born in 1966, in Sinfra, Ivory Coast. He studied Spanish history between 1986 and 1988 at the University of Abidjan. Between 1988 and 1995, he studied at Institut national supérieur des arts et de l'action culturelle (INSAAC) in Abidjan. In 1997, he won the DAAD scholarship, and moved to Germany where he studied at Kunstakademie Düsseldorf, with Klaus Rinke.

Bi uses wood as the medium in his sculptures and installations. His production also includes performances.

== Works ==
- "Remember – Repeat – Reprocess" Installation by Jems Robert Koko Bi (Germany/Ivory Coast) and Wolfgang Hekele (Germany) for "Forest Art Path Laboratory" in 2006, in Darmstadt, Germany
- Some works on the website of Freie Akademie der bildenden Künste, Essen
- "Don't Fence Me Out", 2005, Installation for 7th Dak’Art Biennial of Contemporary African Art'.

== Exhibitions ==
- 2020 „Im Wald geboren. Jems Koko Bi & HAP Grieshaber“, Kunstmuseum Reutlingen | Spendhaus, 2020
- 2014 Jems Robert Koko Bi & Katharina Lökenhoff: Kein Titel – galerie#23, Velbert, "The Divine Comedy. Heaven, Purgatory and Hell Revisited by Contemporary African Artists" -Museum für Moderne Kunst (MMK), Frankfurt/Main
- 2009 "Art Brussels" Catalogue, Nomad Gallery, Brussels
- 2008 "The Great Art Exhibition" Museum Kunst Palast, Düsseldorf, Germany
- 2008 Toronto International Art Fair, Toronto, Ontario, Canada
- 2008 8th Dak’Art Biennial of Contemporary African Art, Dakar, Senegal
- 2008 "Travesia", Centro Atlantico de Arte Moderno, Las Palmas de Gran Canaria, Spain
- 2008 "L'homme est un Mystère", Musée de la Briqueterie, Brittany, France
- 2008 "Premier choix", Musée de la Rotonde des Arts Contenporains Abidjan, Côte d´Ivoire
- 2007 "CAFKA.07 Haptic", an international forum of contemporary public art held in Kitchener, Ontario, Canada
- 2007 "AfriqueEurope: Reves croises" Contemporary African Art in Ateliers des Tanneurs, Brussels, Belgium. Group exhibition curated by Yacouba Konaté. Artists included: El Anatsui, Nu Barreto, El Berry Bickle and Luis Basto, Frédéric Bruly Bouabré, Dilomprizulike, Mustapha Dime, El Loko, Tapfuma Gutsa, Annie Haloba, Jak Katarikawe, Jems Robert Koko Bi, Abdoulaye Konate, Bill Kouelany, Siriki Ky, Ndary Lo, Toyin Loye, Churchill Madikida, Joel Mpah Dooh, Francis Mampuya, Ingrid Mwangi, Robert Hutter, Serigne Niang, Babacar Niang, Samuel Olou, Freddy Tsimba, and Guy Bertrand Wouété.
- 2006 7th Dak’Art Biennial of Contemporary African Art, Dakar, Senegal
- 2006 "EUROPE-AFRICA", Brussels, Belgium
- 2005 "Kunst am Baum" in Städtischen Museum in Gelsenkirchen, Germany
- 2004 "Sculpteur d'ailleurs", International symposium & exhibition, Abbaye de Bon Repos, Saint- Gelves, France
- 2004 "L’homme est un Mystere", Musée de l´espace Francois Mitérand, Guingamp, France
- 2004 "Sculpture Sculpture", International Sculptors Symposium, Joucas, France 2004
- 2003 "XARALA", Art sans frontière Abbatial Palais, Saint-Hubert, Belgium
- 2003 "L'Europe fantôme", Espace Vertebra, Brussels, Belgium
- 2003 "Blick nach Afrika" (Heilbronn) Künstlerbund Heilbronn, Germany
- 2003 "Carrefour", GEA, Bochum, Germany
- 2003 "Bienal de la Habana VIII: El arte con la vida", Wifredo Lam Contemporary Art Center, Cuba
- 2003 Düsseldorfer große Kunst Ausstellung, Museum Kunst Palast, Düsseldorf, Germany
- 2002 5th Dak’Art Biennial of Contemporary African Art, Dakar, Senegal
- 2002 "ASSIMILATION", Atelier vor Ort Anne Berlit, Gallery ATISS, Dak 'Art Biennale and the Dakar
- 2001 "Paradis obscur", Forum Bildender Künstler, Essen, Germany
- 2001 "Künstler gegen Gewalt und Ausgrenzung", Landtag Düsseldorf, Germany
- 2001 "Die andere Seit der Kette", Atelier Projekt Kettenschmiedemuseum, Fröndenberg, Germany
- 2000 4th Dak’Art Biennial of Contemporary African Art, Dakar, Senegal
- 1999 "Traumfabrik", Galerie Sparkasse Mülheim an der Ruhr, Germany
- 1998 Städtische Museen, Heilbronn, Germany (catalogue)
- 1998 Iwalawa House, University of Bayreuth, Germany
- 1997 ARTEFACT 97, Abidjan
- 1996 ARTEFACT 96, Abidjan

== Performances ==
- 2008 "Dédouanement" Musée de la Rotonde des Arts Contemporains, Abidjan
- 2006 "Menschen Erde" Waldkunst Pfad, Darmstadt
- 2004 "Mea culpa", Joucas en Provence
- 2003 "Chemin de l´épreuve", Havana Biennale, Cuba
- 2002 "Galère" Dakar Biennale Dakar
- 2002 "Camouflage, The Center of Contemporary Art of Southern, East and West Africa, Belgium
- 2001 "Return of the children of Gorée", Gorée, Dakar, Sénégal
- 2001 "On change de terre", Düsseldorf Art Academy, Germany
- 2001 "Zwei Spuren, ein Weg", Anne Berlit – Koko Bi, Alte Synagoge, Essen, Germany
- 2001 "Die andere Seite der Kette", Kettenschmiedemuseum, Fröndenberg, Germany

== Awards ==
- Francophone Prize, Dakar Biennale 2008
- Foundation Art and Culture of North Rhine-Westphalia: Project Scholarship
- The Dakar Biennale, Prize, 2000
- The Kunstverein Düsseldorf Prize

== Bibliography ==
- Fall, N'Gone; Pivin, Jean Loup, eds. (2002). An Anthology of African Art: The Twentieth Century. New York: Distributed Art Publishers. ISBN 978-1-891024-38-2.

== See also ==
- Contemporary African Art
- Culture of Côte d'Ivoire
