= Bété syllabary =

Writing system

- Script type: Syllabary
- Period: 1950s-present
- Direction: Left-to-right
- Languages: Bété

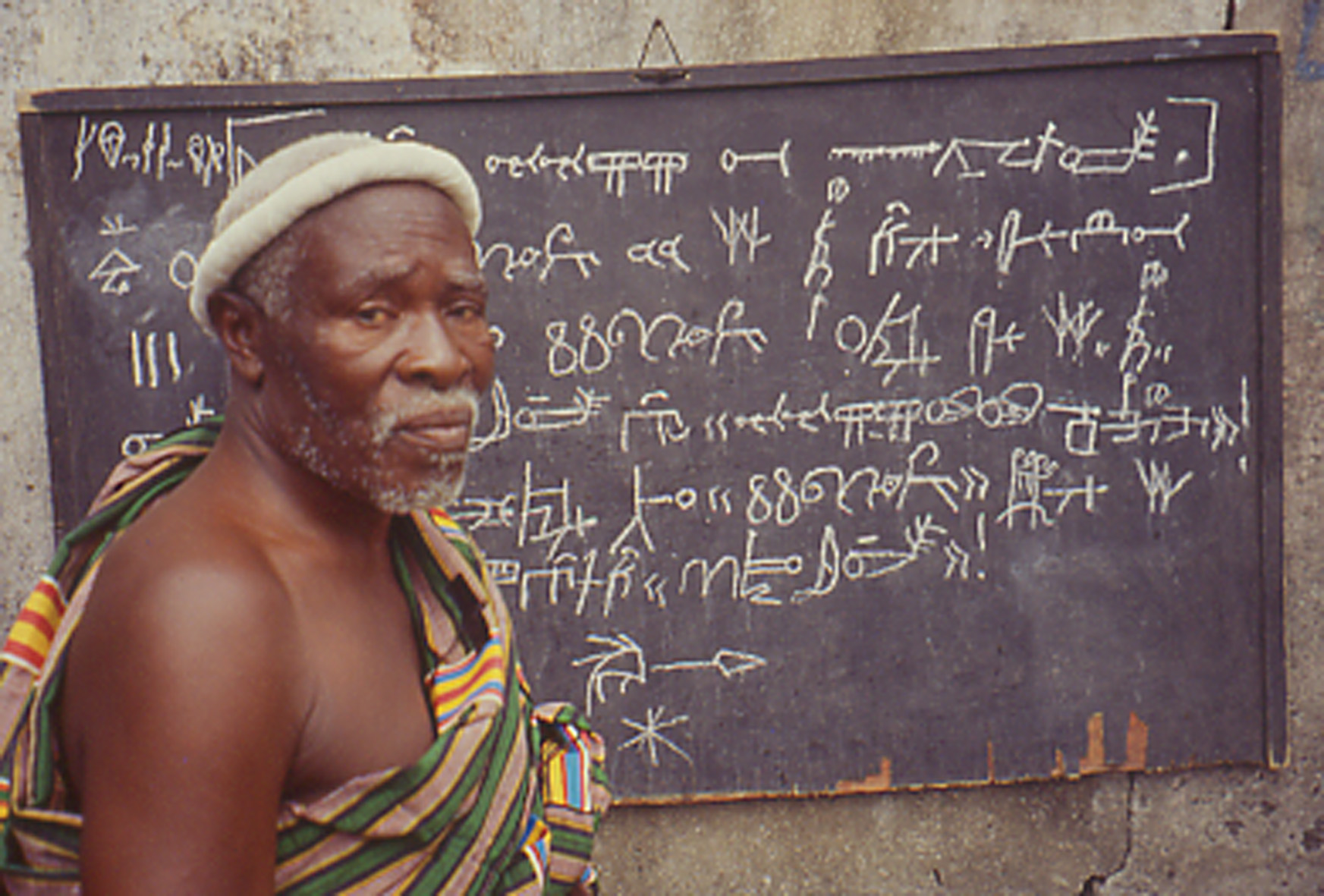
blackboard with Bété syllabary

The Bété syllabary was created for the Bété language of Côte d'Ivoire (in West Africa) in the 1950s by artist Frédéric Bruly Bouabré.

It consists of about 440 pictographic characters, which represent scenes from life and stand for syllables in Bété. Bouabré created it to help Bété people learn to read in their language.

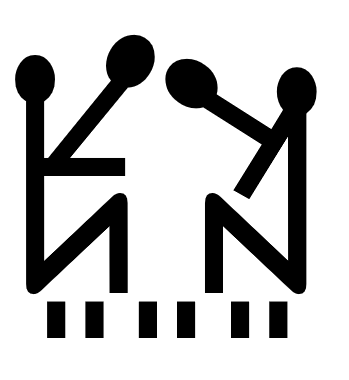
bhɛ

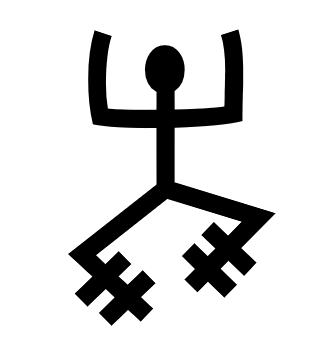
dje

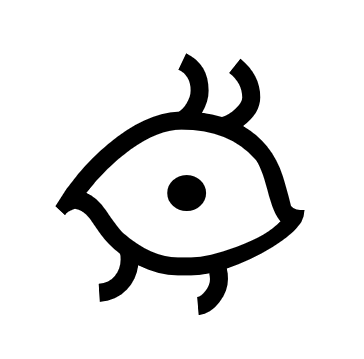
dji

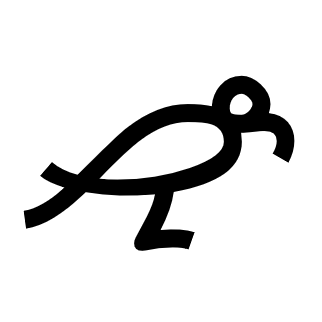
kpɛ

== History ==
=== Bété language ===
3 million Bété people live in the Côte d'Ivoire, and their language is not taught in schools. There was no writing system for Bété languages before this one; all education is in French. There are five main dialects of Bété. Syllabaries are generally used for languages with simple rules of syllabic combination; English, for example, would not work well for a syllabary because there are over ten-thousand different possibilities for individual syllables.

=== Frédéric Bruly Bouabré ===
Bouabré was among the first to be educated by the French government. While working as a civil servant, he completed hundreds of small sketches, drawing from local folklore and also his own visions. He ceased his work as a civil servant in 1948, due to a vision he received on March 11 of that year, to dedicate himself to art entirely.

His earlier art drew heavily on a desire to preserve and catalogue Bété culture. Art critic Yacouba Konate mentions that after the vision he had received, he realised that he needed to develop an African writing system to work in. Believing that it would allow him to better catalogue Bété culture.

La Méthodologie de la Nouvelle Écriture Africaine “Bété”, the work in which Bouabré first catalogued his syllabary, was originally written in a Toyota notebook. His major encyclopedic work, for which he called himself “Cheik Nadro”, meaning “the one who never forgets," is composed of 400 small pictures drawn with ballpoint pens and crayons. These cards display symbolic imagery with text surrounding it.

== Current use ==
Bouabré intended his syllabary to achieve universal use—not just for Bété, but for the world. However it has not achieved any such use. His artwork, however, has received general praise along these lines; Schuster described it as presenting the universal nature of being human. His syllabary has been used for educational purposes – to teach Bété people to learn Bété. A Latinate alphabet is still, however, the most widely used.

Dodo Bai, a student of Frédéric Bruly Bouabré, produced a handwritten translation of a French Wikipedia article into Bouabré's syllabary. It is still not possible to produce a computer-generated version: there is still not unicode Bouabré's Bété syllabary, though there is a PUA version, which gives some indication of what an official Unicode version might look like.

Debbie Anderson from the Script Encoding Initiative at UC Berkeley has provided working documents that may lead to a preliminary proposal for Bouabré's Bété syllabary in the Unicode.

== Typology ==
In a syllabary, a syllable is generally represented by a character. There are several kinds of characters in Bété.

1. A single character (denote this ‘A’) – the majority are of this kind.
2. A double character repeated twice horizontally, ‘AA’
3. A double character produced by repeating a single character any way other than horizontally
4. A double character produced by repeating two different single characters ‘AB’
5. Marks to indicate stress or pronunciation.

The ↝ acts as a hyphenation mark, thereby distinguishing a double character from two single characters.

There are over 20 characters which are double characters for which no single character exists.

== Examples ==
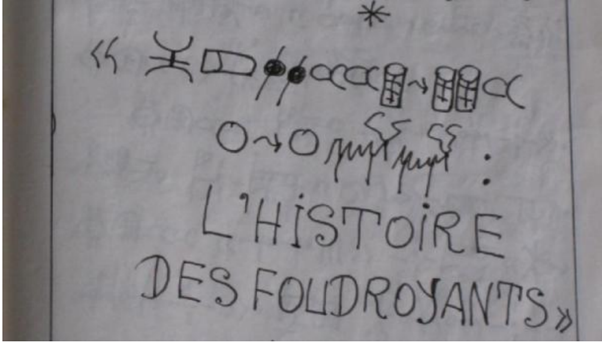
picture from Frédéric Bruly Bouabré's syllabary

Note how the arrow ↝ here acts to separate a single character from a double character made of that single character: that is, A+AA, instead of AAA (which would be ungrammatical).

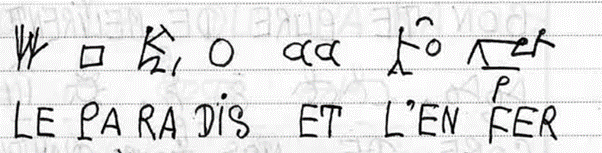
picture from Frédéric Bruly Bouabré's syllabary

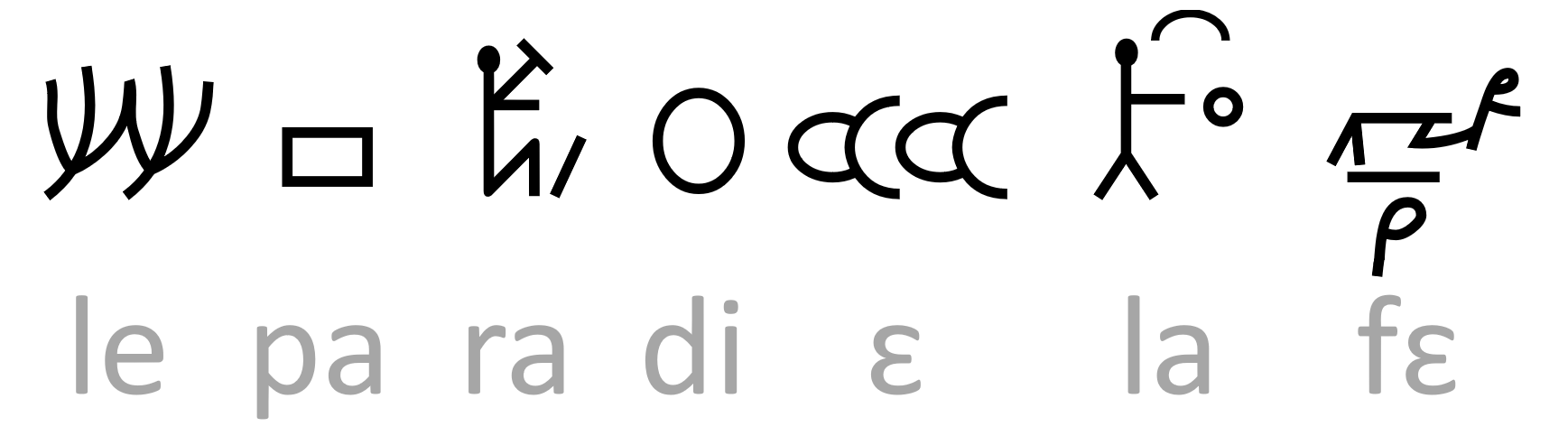

Here is a showcase of how it works. Spaces are not part of the syllabary. The last character fer meaning iron, and et meaning and. The character corresponding to and is composed of two single characters for which there is not a single character represented. In both cases, note how the characters are pictograms of what they mean. However, this is a syllabary, so that ra, for example, is not a word but a syllable (see rebus principle). The syllable Dis. This syllable for example, also means say.

== See also ==
- Bété languages
- Blissymbols
