= Dakar Biennale 1990 =

The Dakar Biennale 1990 is the first edition of the Dakar Biennale organised in Dakar in Senegal in 1990 and focused on literature.

The biennale is opened in Dakar with the title Biennale des Lettres (Biennale of literature) and is focused on Aires Culturelles et Création Littéraire en Afrique (Cultural zones and literary production in Africa).

== Programme ==
The biennale consists of a debate structured in four workshops. At the centre of the attention there are both national literature and a pan-African approach, capable of linking and strengthening the production of the African continent and its diaspora. Languages, genres, aesthetic concerns and cultural networks are themes which emerge from the presentations. The event is dedicated to Léopold Sédar Senghor – first president of Senegal (1960–1980) – who participates to the opening and who is called by its successor Abdou Diouf Monsieur le Président.

During the biennale take place also music, theatre and dance events and several exhibitions. The Dakar National Gallery shows around 100 artworks from the national collection of art; the Village de la Biennale de Dakar – build for the event – hosts a series of stands with exhibition-selling of artwork produced by Senegalese artists.

== See also ==
- Dakar Biennale
- Dak'Art 1992. First edition focused on visual art.
- Dak'Art 1996. First edition focused on Contemporary African Art.
- Dak'Art 1998. Third edition.
- Dak'Art 2000. Fourth edition.
- Dak'Art 2002. Fifth edition.
- Dak'Art 2004. Sixth edition.
- Dak'Art 2006. Seventh edition and first edition with an artistic director.
- Dak'Art 2008. Eighth edition.
- Dak'Art 2010. Ninth edition.
