= Zépréguhé =

- Village
- Location in Ivory Coast
- Coordinates: 6°54′N 6°22′W
- Country: Ivory Coast
- District: Sassandra-Marahoué
- Region: Haut-Sassandra
- Department: Daloa
- Sub-prefecture: Daloa
- Time zone: UTC+0 (GMT)

Zépréguhé is a village in western Ivory Coast. It is in the sub-prefecture of Daloa, Daloa Department, Haut-Sassandra Region, Sassandra-Marahoué District.

Until 2012, Zépréguhé was in the commune of Idibouo-Zépréguhé. In March 2012, Idibouo-Zépréguhé became one of 1,126 communes nationwide that were abolished.

The Ivorian painter Frédéric Bruly Bouabré was born in Zépréguhé.
