= Peter Eastman (artist) =

South African artist

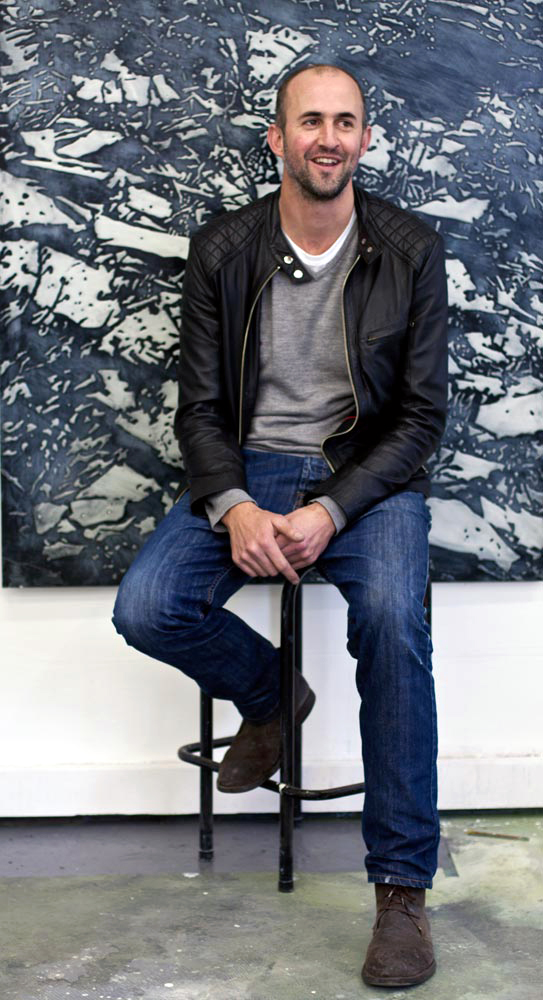
- Peter Eastman, portrait for Crush magazine
- Born: 1976 (age 49–50)
- Known for: Painting
- Website: www.petereastman.com

Peter Eastman (born 1976) is a South African artist living in Cape Town.

== Education ==
Eastman was born in 1976 and grew up in South Africa. He began his career as an antiquities restorer in London, United Kingdom. He also attended University of Cape Town's Michaelis School of fine art.

== Work ==
In 2014 he began to focus on paintings of pensive and atmospheric forest-scapes,

Eastman is also known for a distinctive monochromatic style. Images held in shallow relief depictions remain nearly invisible until the spectator is positioned correctly for light to throw the images into relief, reflecting changing tone and colour. This technique was probably most successfully used in his monumental “Horse”, 2005.

In 2007, Eastman presented 'Supernature' at Cape Town gallery whatiftheworld. The naturalistic large-scale series of enamel and acrylic paintings on aluminium sheets, depicted the portraits of various owl species relating to themes of superstition and luck.

In 2010, Eastman exhibited a series of black portraits at Primo Marella gallery in Milan, Italy, curated by Yacouba Konaté.

Eastman was selected alongside 17 International artists to produce a poster for The 2010 FIFA World Cup in South Africa. Later that year, the work was auctioned at Phillips de Pury in New York City.

== See also ==
- Contemporary African art

== Selected solo exhibitions ==
2019 Tangled Hierarchies, Smac Gallery, Cape Town, South Africa

2017 Coldstream, Smac Gallery, Johannesburg, South Africa

2016 Surface Light, Smac Gallery, Cape Town, South Africa

2014 Deep Chine, Smac Gallery, Cape Town, South Africa

2012 Buried in black and white, Whatiftheworld gallery, Cape Town, South Africa

2010 Life is short, WhatiftheworldIFTHEWORLD gallery, Cape Town, South Africa

2010 For the term of their natural lives, Co-Op gallery, Johannesburg, South Africa

2009 Peter Eastman Landscapes, Aardklop National arts festival, Potchefstroom, South Africa

2008 Shadow Paintings, Obert contemporary, Johannesburg, South Africa

Supernature, Whatiftheworld gallery, Cape Town, South Africa

2007 Black Paintings, Obert Contemporary, Johannesburg, South Africa

2004 Reflective, Stevenson Gallery, Cape Town, South Africa
