= Ananias Leki Dago =

Ivorian photographer

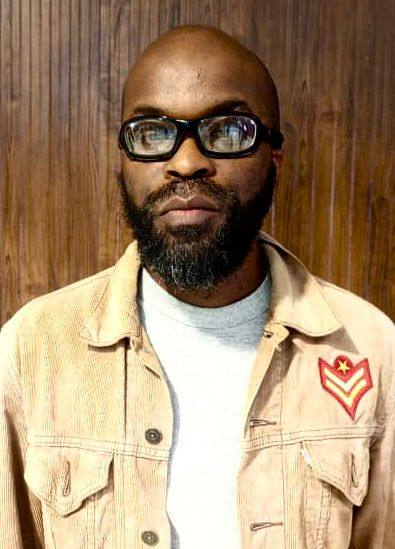
- Born: 2 November 1970 (age 55); Abidjan, Ivory Coast
- Education: Institut National Supérieur de l'Action et de l'Animation Culturelle
- Known for: Photographer

Ananias Leki Dago (born 2 November 1970) is an Ivorian photographer.

== Biography ==
Ananias Leki Dago is a graduate of the Institut National Supérieur de l'Action et de l'Animation Culturelle in Abidjan, Ivory Coast.

During a period of exile living in Europe, resulting from political unrest in his native Ivory Coast, he worked for magazines such as Africultures and Regards. From 1997 to 2001, he served as the Official Photographer for the Marché des arts et du spectacle africains (MASA), based in Abidjan.

His photographs have been exhibited in museums and cultural spaces such as the Centre Pompidou and the Musée de l’Histoire de l'Immigration in Paris, France; Fondation Donwahi in Abidjan; the Moderna Museet in Stockholm, Sweden; the Philadelphia Museum of Art in Philadelphia, Pennsylvania; and the Biennale of Contemporary African Art (Dak'Art) in Dakar, Senegal, and are part of the permanent collections of institutions such as the Fundació Vila Casas in Barcelona, Spain; the Fondation Sindika Dokolo in Luanda, Angola; the Harlem Studio Museum in New York, New York; the Philadelphia Museum of Art; the Musée du Quai Branly and the Galeries Photo Fnac in Paris, France, as well as various international private collections.

In 2019, Ananias Leki Dago represented the Ivory Coast at the Biennale di Venezia, in Venice, Italy, participating in the exhibit "Ivory Coast: The Open Shadows of Memory".

Founder of the first international photography festival in Abidjan, Les Rencontres du Sud, and restorer of the negatives of Paul Kodjo - the "Father of Ivorian photography", Ananias Leki Dago is the author of five publications featuring his photographic works: Ananias Leki-Dago, photographe (Les éditions de l'oeil, 2003), Shebeen Blues (Éditions Gang, 2010), Mabati (Native Intelligence and Goethe-Institut Kenia, 2013), La Nawa (Éditions Gang, Conseil Régional de la Nawa, 2016), and Rainy Days Abidjan (Éditions Éburnie, 2019). He has also served as a photographer in residence for established artistic programs in Europe, Africa, and the Caribbean.

== Bibliography ==
- Ananias Leki Dago, photographe, by Ananias Leki Dago (photographs) and Yann Le Goff (text), Les éditions de l'œil, Paris, 2003
  (French, Monograph, Softcover, 165x120mm, full colour, 24 pgs.) ISBN 978-2-912415-70-7
- Et change de regards! : un appareil photographique pour changer de regard et vivre la solidarité, by Ananias Leki Dago and Yann Arthus-Bertrand, Équilibres & populations, Paris, 2003 (French, 24cm, full colour, 65 pgs.) ISBN 2-9517914-0-2
- Shebeen Blues: The Wheel is Still in Spin, by Ananias Leki Dago (photographs) and Mongane Wally Serote (text), Éditions Gang, Ivry-sur-Seine, 2010 (French, 240x220mm, 122 pgs.) ISBN 978-2-918376-02-6
- Mabati, by Ananias Leki Dago (photographs), Simon Njami (essays) and Billy Kahora (essays), edited by Contact Zones, Contact Zones NRB 06, Native Intelligence and Goethe-Institut Kenia, Nairobi, 2013 (English, 22 cm, 104 pgs.) ISBN 978-9-966155-34-4
- La Nawa, by Ananias Leki Dago (photographs) and Érika Nimis (Ed., "Devoir de mémoire" (text), by Ananias Leki Dago), Éditions Gang, Conseil Régional de la Nawa, in co-production with Emerge and See!, and in co-publication with NEI-CEDA, Côte d'Ivoire, 2016 (French, 25x35cm, limited edition of 2000 copies, 184 pgs.) ISBN 978-2-84487-729-1
- Rainy Days Abidjan, by Ananias Leki Dago and Véronique Tadjo, Éditions Éburnie, Abidjan, 2019 (French and English, 22×29.5cm, 96 pgs.) ISBN 978-2-847703-96-2

== Filmography ==
- Ysasu: La Mode dans la rue André del Sarte (2007), directed by Yvonne Michele Anderson (Ruth Rachel Anderson-Avraham) (Still Photographer)
- Nous sommes (2007; dist. 2012) (Photographies / Still Photographer)
- Ananias Léki Dago - Photographe. (2016), directed by Sibylle Desjardins for the Fondation Zinsou (Soi-même / Himself, Photographies / Still Photographer)
- Je reste photographe (2022), directed by Ananias Léki Dago (Soi-même / Himself, Photographies / Still Photographer)

== Awards ==
- 2004 - Distinction, Kodak Prize of Critical Photography, Paris, France
- 2009 - First Prize, PhotoAfrica context, Tarifa, Spain

== See also ==
- Contemporary African Art
- Culture of Ivory Coast
