= Claudie Titty Dimbeng =

French painter

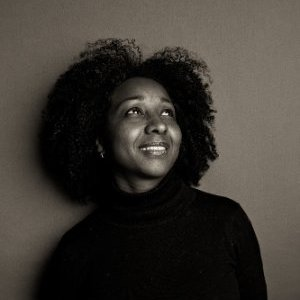
Claudie Titty Dimbeng (2015)

Claudie Titty Dimbeng née Claudie Adonit Manouan (born 1968), frequently known simply as Dimbeng, is an Ivorian-born, feminist visual artist who has lived in Paris since 1987. A proponent of the abstract, figurative approach of "Mixed Art Relief", she makes use of local Ivorian materials to symbolize her links with her mother country. Her work has been widely exhibited in Africa and Europe. In 2012, she represented the Ivory Coast during Africa Week at the UNESCO Headquarters, Paris. In July 2020, she exhibited several works at the Centre Pastoral Saint-Merry.

== Biography ==
Born in 1968 in Abidjan, Claudie Titty Dimbeng is the daughter of the French-Ivorian Monique née Wirth and the Ivorian Manouan Adonit who was an ambassador. As a result of her parents' diplomatic duties, she spent her childhood in Germany and Austria. After matriculating from the French lycée in Vienna (1986), she hoped to become a painter but her father disagreed. As a compromise, she studied first at the Académie Charpentier (1986–1987) and then went on to study interior architecture at the École Supérieure des Arts Modernes (1987–1991). In 1999, deciding to concentrate on painting, she studied under Valérie N’dri and Valentin Caro. She is married to Alain Titty Dimbeng.

Dimbeng was inspired by the Ivorian "Vohou Vohou" movement from the 1970s. It was developed by Youssouf Bath, Théodore Koudougnon, Mathilde Moraeau, Kra N’Guessan and Yacouba Touré, who made use of West African materials rather than canvas and oils in order to "Africanize Ivorian painting. She created her own variant, "Mixed Art Relief", using the Renaissance sfumato technique with multiple layers of paint to depict relief. She sees the result, as the symbolic representation of mixed cultures, leading to a new identity. Making extensive use of bark-based fabrics and raphia, her works depict shapes reflecting birds, trees or flowering jacarandas, at times combining humans, trees and animals in her distinctly personal style.

Dimbeng's work has been exhibited in the Ivory Coast, India and across Europe. In 2012, she represented the Ivory Coast during Africa Week at the UNESCO Headquarters, Paris. In July 2020, she exhibited several works at the Centre Pastoral Saint-Merry.
