= Bété people =

Kru ethnic group of Ivory Coast

Bété
Total population
- 600,000

Regions with significant populations
- Ivory Coast

Languages
- Bété languages

Religion
- Christianity, traditional religions, Islam

Related ethnic groups
- Kru

The Bété are an ethnic group within Côte d'Ivoire, where they represent approximately 18% of the population (as of 2010). They have cultural and artistic links to the Dan, the We (Gwere) and the Guro, reflected in the Bété mask dances. The Bété are a tribe of the Kru ethnic group. There are 93 distinct subgroups within the Bété group.

== History ==
Bété oral history says that they lived in the Sahel or West Sudanian savanna until warfare in the 17th century led them to emigrate to what is now the southwestern portion of Côte d'Ivoire, around the city of Gagnoa, and the Gagnoa Department more generally. They violently resisted French colonial rule until 1906, at which point their land was added to French West Africa. Under colonial rule, they largely converted to Christianity and began farming cash crops: specifically, cocoa and coffee.

Traditionally, the Bété and many other ethnic groups in the Ivory Coast region did not view themselves as coherent ethnic units prior to colonial times. The sense of group identity was instead at a smaller level, often a village or clan. The notion of distinct ethnic groups for Ivorian peoples, including the Bété, were instead an outgrowth of colonialist desires to group indigenous people into mutually exclusive categories for administrative purposes. These identities have had far-reaching consequences, as the French colonialists assigned social roles and expectations based on these imposed categories. The term "Bété" for members of this ethnic group arose from their role as plantation workers in the colonial system, and they have suffered from negative stereotypes associated with that historical role.

Political conflicts in Côte d'Ivoire are influenced by the ethnic divisions, and political figures often seek to broaden their support base through inter-ethnic marriages or other ways of expanding their identities beyond their particular ethnic group. The Bété have been on both sides of the ethnopolitical divide within Côte d'Ivoire. They were repressed and even massacred by the first president of the country, Félix Houphouët-Boigny. But one of the jailed Bété dissidents under Houphouët-Boigny, Laurent Gbagbo, would later become the country's president himself.

Members of the Bété community participated in a short-lived secession attempt from Côte d'Ivoire in 1970, called the state of Eburnie. Concerned about their lack of political presence in the one-party state, they took over the Gagnoa city hall and declared independence. The rebellion was brutally attacked by the government, killing hundreds of people in what came to be known as the Guébié genocide.

== Social structure ==
Bété are known for their focus on individual rights. Villages have limited social stratification, and there is little organization across villages. Like other Kru societies in the western Côte d'Ivoire, the society is patrilineal. Traditionally, inheritance is adelphic, meaning that a man's heirs are first his brothers and cousins of his generation. Only after all of his brothers and cousins have died can his children inherit his possessions.

=== Religion ===
Today much of the population is Christian, and specifically Roman Catholic. In the late 1970s, there was a wave of conversion to Islam among the Bété, influenced by French-language reformist preaching.

=== Marriage and family ===
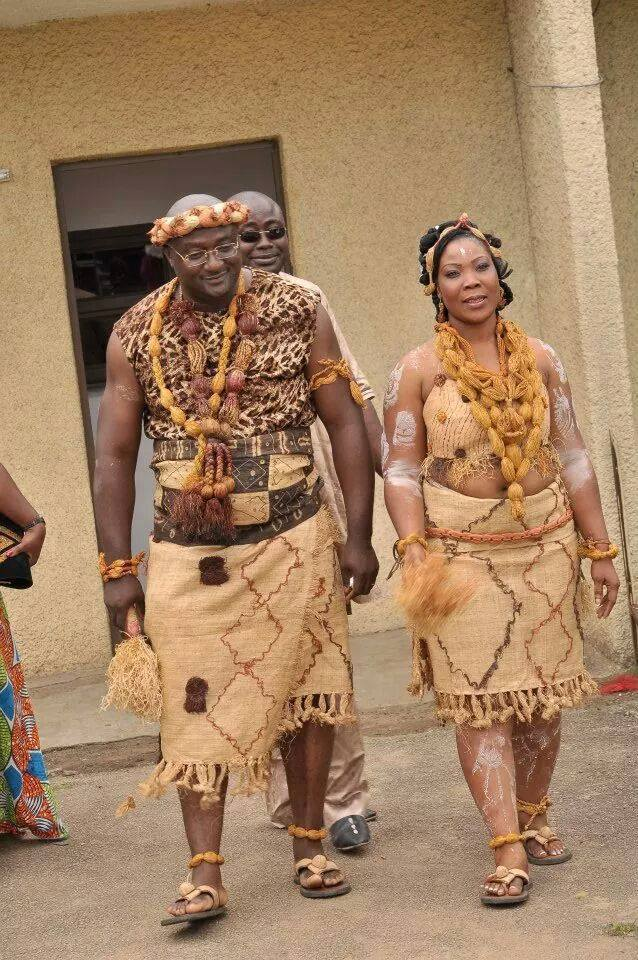
Two people wearing traditional Bété attire at a wedding

Polygyny has been a traditional practice among all ethnic groups of Côte d’Ivoire, including the Bété people. In a 1985 survey in Gagnoa, 45% of Bété women were polygamously married, despite a 1964 government prohibition of the practice. Although polygyny remained common, views were changing, and three-quarters of surveyed women preferred monogamous relationships for their daughters. The Ivorian government also has pushed to encourage monogamous relationships in a variety of ways, including offering government child support to children of legally-wed couples.

== Art ==
=== Masks ===
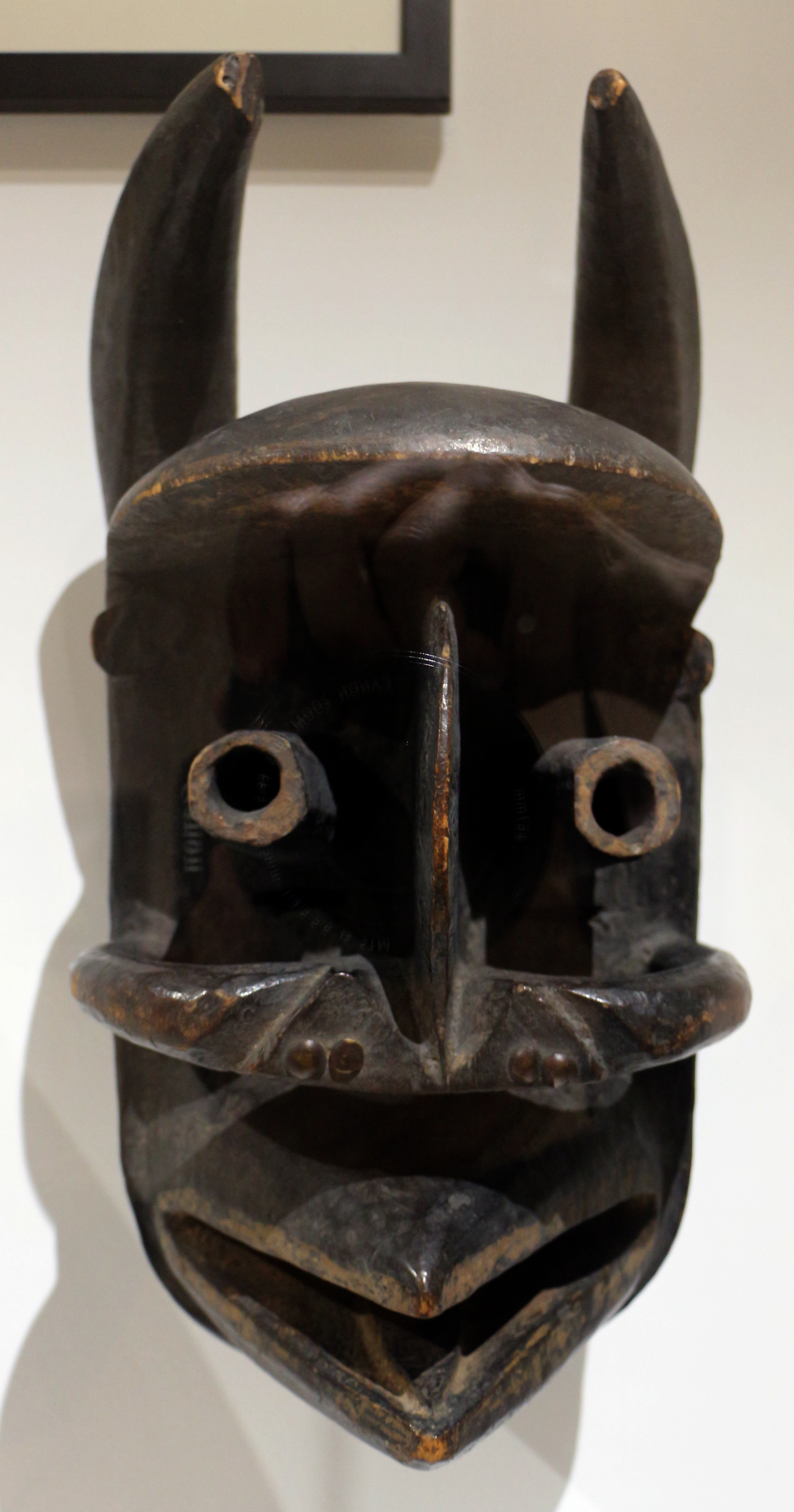
A Bété war mask

Artistically, the Bété are best known for their complex masks. The culture of mask-making and wearing came from the We (Guéré) people, and spread into neighboring cultures, including the Bété. Masked dancing events represented a traditional core for the Bété socioreligious practice, and creativity is highly valued both in terms of mask design and the dances in which the masks are used.

Masks fall into three categories. The first is a Great Mask. There is at most one Great Mask per village, and it serves as the repository of all the spiritual forces of the village, protecting the community. The second category, "middle" masks, are well-constructed and consecrated masks used by dancers in festivals and other community events. Villages can have multiple masks in this category, and they may be used simultaneously in ceremonies. They take on more diverse forms than the Great Masks. The final category is "training" masks, used by boys as they practice the mask dances.

Mask dances serve many purposes. Traditional uses include cleansing and protecting the village, performing funeral rites, greeting visitors and dignitaries, meting out social criticism, overseeing judicial proceedings, and leading the men to war. In modern times, the role of these masks has changed, and they are primarily used for entertainment, at funerals, or to mark the end of a mourning period.

=== Sculpture ===
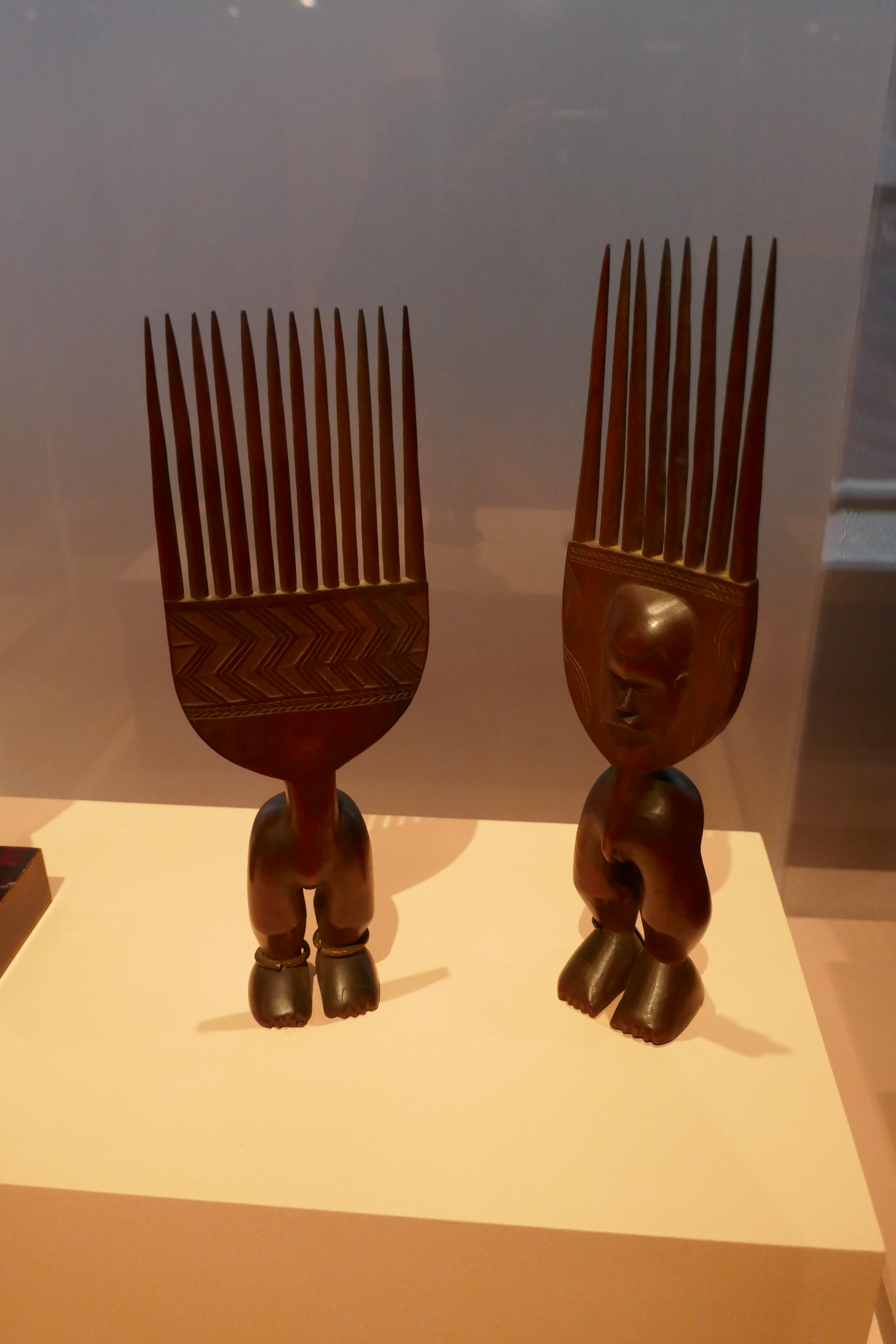
Anthropomorphic combs from the Bété

Compared to masks, statues are far less common and less complex in traditional Bété culture. Statues are used in ceremonies commemorating female ancestors, but are simple, sober, and abstracted.

Rare figures with exaggerated genitalia are probably linked to a magico-religious fertility appeal. Alternatively, they may have constituted a more general role, evoking or celebrating the fertility of the village/land, its founders or the forest from which the people made their living.

== Language ==
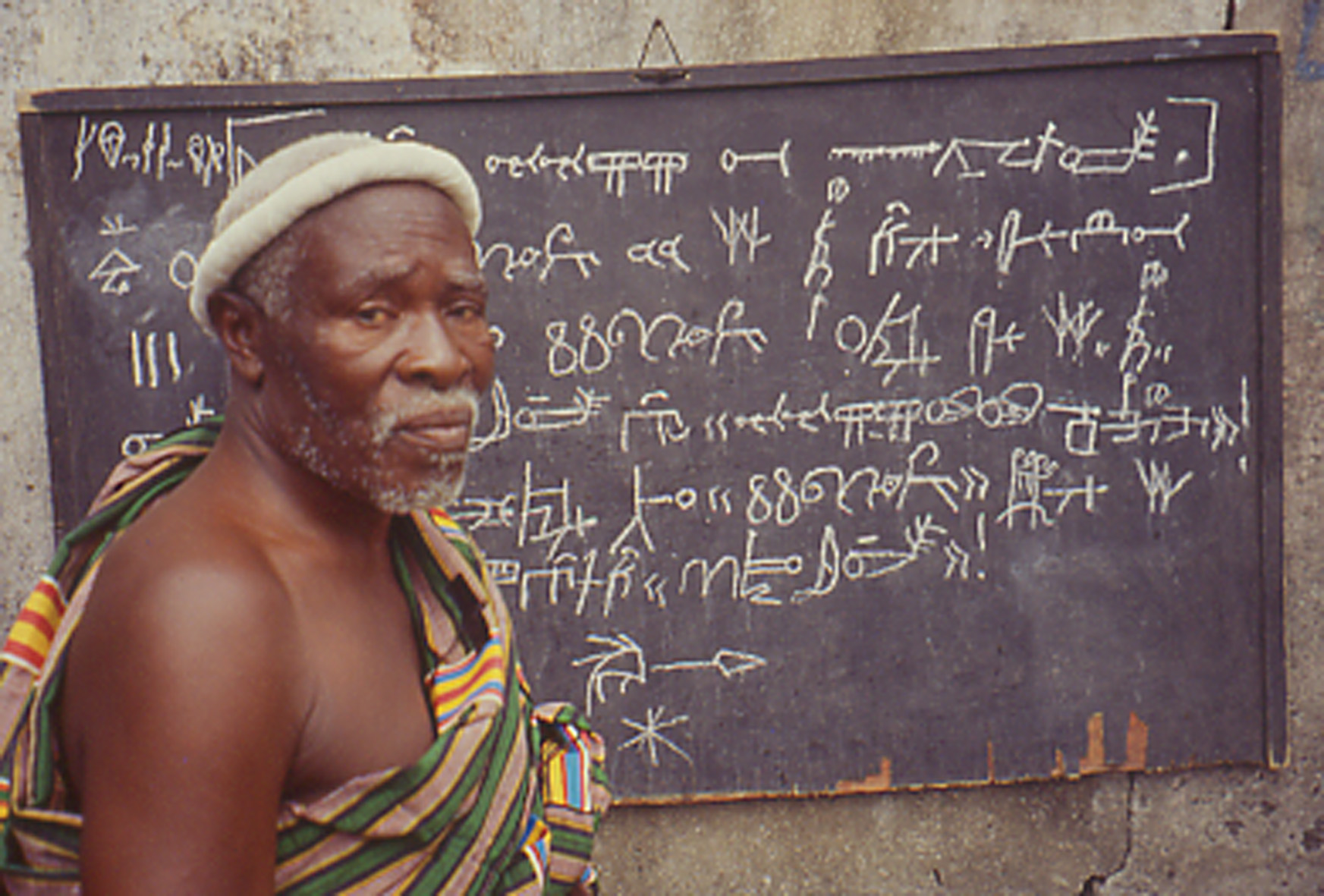
The Bété language, written on a blackboard

The Bété languages are a dialect continuum within the Kru language group. The first writing system for the language was the Bété syllabary, developed by Bété artist Frédéric Bruly Bouabré in the 1950s.

== Notable people ==
- Frédéric Bruly Bouabré, artist and inventor of the Bété syllabary
- Didier Drogba, footballer
- Laurent Gbagbo, President of Côte d'Ivoire (2000-2011)
- Johan Djourou
- Simon Adingra
- Brice Dja Djédjé
- Cyril Domoraud
- Gervinho
- Hervé Guy
- Jean-Jacques Gosso
- Igor Lolo
- Koffi Kouao
- Soumahoro Bangaly
- Bonaventure Kalou
- Salomon Kalou
- Eric Bailly
- Franck Kessié
- Serge Aurier
- Maxwel Cornet
- Max Gradel

== See also ==
- Bété languages
