= O'Plérou =

Ivorian artist, illustrator and graphic designer

- Born: O'Plérou Luc Denis Grebet; November 7, 1997 (age 28); Abidjan, Ivory Coast
- Education: Bachelor's degree in Graphic design
- Occupations: Graphic designer, Illustrator Type designer
- Years active: 2018–present
- Known for: Illustration
- Notable work: Zouzoukwa
- Awards: Forbes Africa 30 Under 30 (2020)
- Website: http://oplerou.studio

O'Plérou Grebet is an Ivorian artist, graphic designer and illustrator known to have designed more than 365 free emojis that portrays West African culture. He was named in the Forbes Africa 30 Under 30 list. He also co-authored the proposals for a hamsa and libation emoji, which were added to Unicode 14.0 in September 2021.

== Early life and education ==
O'Plérou Luc Denis Grebet was born on November 7, 1997, in Abidjan, Ivory Coast. He was frequently drawing to spend time as a child. He went to the Fine Arts School of Abidjan for one year, then studied graphic design and web development at the Institute of Sciences and Communication Techniques.

== Zouzoukwa Project ==
In September 2017, O’Plérou learned to make emojis by watching a YouTube tutorial. He launched his project "Zouzoukwa", on January 1, 2018, for which he aimed to design and publish every day on Instagram a new Africa related emoji till the end of the year. His main goal was to share the Ivorian culture with the world through social media. Within the first week of starting this project, he gained 2,000 new followers.

In December 2018, he incorporated all 365 emojis into an app to make his emojis usables as stickers on WhatsApp and iMessage.

He won the Young Talent Award at Africa Digital Communication Days (Adicom Days) at Abidjan, Ivory Coast, the meeting place for digital actors in French-speaking Africa for his project. In the process, he collaborated with the French channel Canal +, which uses some of his "made in Ivo" emoticons on social networks during the football World Cup in June and July. He collaborated with an Ivorian brand of clothing and accessories, Imalk Concept, with his emojis on tote bags.

== Typeface Design ==
Following his Zouzoukwa project, O’Plérou began creating typefaces to promote Ivorian culture. In 2025, he released ALT Nadrey through ALT.tf, a foundry focused on promoting underrepresented designers in the type industry. The typeface represents a notable contribution to diversifying the typography field with African cultural elements and increasing representation of West African designers in the global type community.

O’Plérou’s other typeface works include OS Korhogo and OS Gagnoa, each inspired by the eponymous cities in Côte d’Ivoire. These projects continue his mission to celebrate and share elements of African visual culture through digital design.
