= Freddy Tsimba =

Congolese artist

- Born: 1967 (age 58–59); Kinshasa, Democratic Republic of Congo
- Occupation: Sculptor

Freddy Tsimba (born 1967) is a sculptor and visual artist from the Democratic Republic of Congo. He has made sculptures from bullet casings collected on Congolese war battlefields. One of his artwork entitled Au-delà de l'espoir (Beyond the hope) was commissioned by the municipality of Ixelles in Brussels and installed on the corner of Chaussée de Wavre and Longue-Vie street in Matonge district.

== Biography ==
Tsimba was born in Kinshasa in 1967. He studied at the Fine Art School in Kinshasa where he got a degree on sculpture in 1989. He received the silver medal at the Ottawa Jeux de la Francophonie in 2001.

== Exhibitions ==
=== Solo exhibitions ===
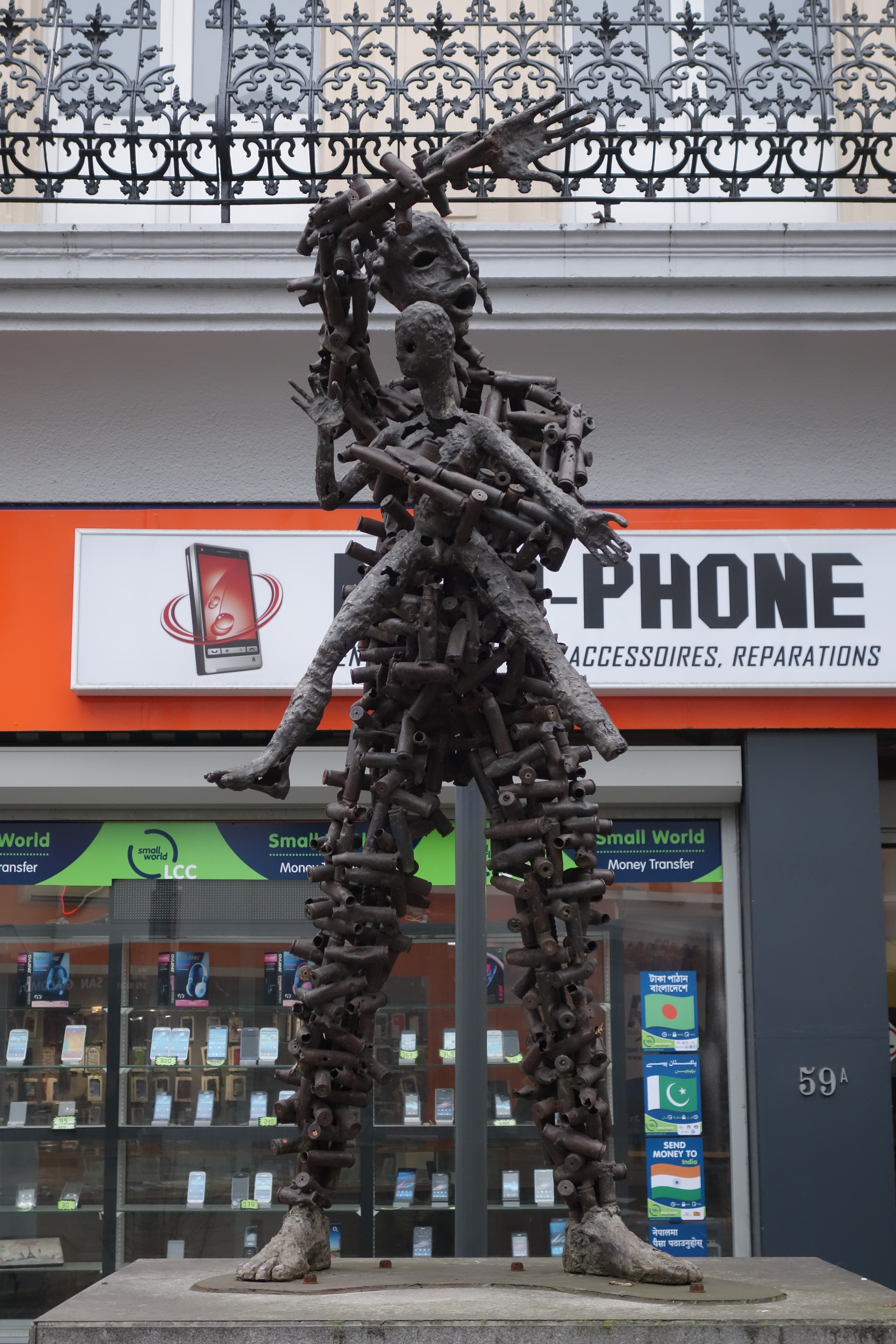
Au-delà de l'espoir (Beyond the hope), Brussels

- 2007: Au-delà de l'espoir (Beyond the hope), installed on the corner of Chaussée de Wavre and Longue-Vie street in Matonge district, Brussels. Commissioned by the municipality of Ixelles
- 2016: Au-delà de l'extrême, Halle de la Gombe, Kinshasa, D.R. Congoz
- 2018: Out of chaos, Beaux Arts Gallery, London
- 2018: Porteuse de vies (Carrier of Lives), Théâtre national de Chaillot, Paris, in celebration of the 70th anniversary of the Universal Declaration of Human Rights
- 2020: Mabele eleki lola ! The earth, brighter than paradise, Royal Museum for Central Africa, Tervuren, Belgium, curated by In Koli Jean Bofane, with the scientific contribution of Henry Bundjoko

=== Group exhibitions ===
- 2008: They come from far away, part Miroirs, 8th Dakar Biennale, Musée Théodore Monod, Dakar, Sénégal
- 2014: Yango the first Kinshasa contemporary art biennial, Kinshasa, D.R. Congo
- 2015–20: Lumières d'Afriques, Paris; Abidjan; Geneva; Dakar; Rabat; Johannesburg
- 2019: Encore un effort, part of 1st Congo Biennale, Kin Art Studio, Kinshasa, D.R. Congo

== Publications ==
- Revue Noire, Spécial Kinshasa - Zaïre, n°21, juin-juillet-août 1996
- Freddy Tsimba. Sculpteur, Les carnets de la création, l'Œil, Paris, 2000
- Freddy Tsimba, l'esprit guerrier, Fondation Blachère, Apt, 2007
- Les Arts du Congo. D'hier à nos jours, Roger-Pierre Turine, éd. La Renaissance du livre, Bruxelles, 2007
- Freddy Tsimba - Légendes et saisons de métal, V. Lombume Kalimasi et C. Nzolo Ngamobu, Ed. Le Cri, 2012
- Singularité et universalité des destins : la démarche artistique de Freddy Tsimba, Bogumil Jewsiewicki, Cahiers D'Études Africaines, vol. 56, no. 223, 2016
- Au-delà de l'extrême, exhibition catalog, 2016
- Freddy Tsimba-Mabele eleki lola ! La terre, plus belle que le paradis, exhibition catalog, In Koli Jean Bofane et al., Kate'Art, 2020

== Filmography ==
- Mavambu (2011) – documentary on Tsimba by Rosine Mbakam and Mirko Popovitch (26', DVcam)
