= Armand Boua =

Ivorian painter (born 1978)

- Born: 1978 (age 47–48); Abidjan, Ivory Coast
- Occupation: Painter

Armand Boua (born 1978) is an Ivorian painter. Boua is known for his technique of painting on cardboard with acrylic paint and tar, then scratching away paint to create negative spaces.

Boua was born in Abidjan. Boua studied at the National School of Fine Arts and at the Technical Center of Applied Arts, both in Abidjan.

His work is included in the collection of the Minneapolis Institute of Art.
