= Paul Kodjo =

Ivorian photographer (1939–2021)

Paul Kodjo (4 July 1939 – 7 August 2021) was an Ivorian photographer. Kodjo was best known for his photographs taken in Abidjan during the 1970s, following the Ivory Coast's independence from France. He has been called the "father of Ivorian photography".

== Early life ==
Kodjo was born in 1939, in Abidjan, Ivory Coast; his mother was Ghanaian and his father was Ivorian. He had his first job as a photographer in Ghana. He later moved to France, where he worked as a correspondent for Fraternité-Matin, an Ivorian publication. During this time he was one of the only Black photographers to document the May 1968 student protests in Paris.

== Career ==
In 1970, Kodjo returned to the Ivory Coast, where he worked a photojournalist. He founded a media agency, and created fictional photographic works such as Photo-romans for the magazine Ivoire Dimanche. In 1973 he received the Grand Prize for International Photographic Reporting.

In the 1990s Kodjo gave up photography. He later entrusted his negatives to the photographer Ananias Léki Dago. Dago worked with the Goethe Institute to restore the negatives, and was instrumental in bringing greater recognition to Kodjo's work.

His work is included in the collection of the Art Gallery of Ontario.

== Death ==
Paul Kodjo died on 7 August 2021, at the age of 82.
