= Dominique Zinkpè =

Beninese contemporary artist

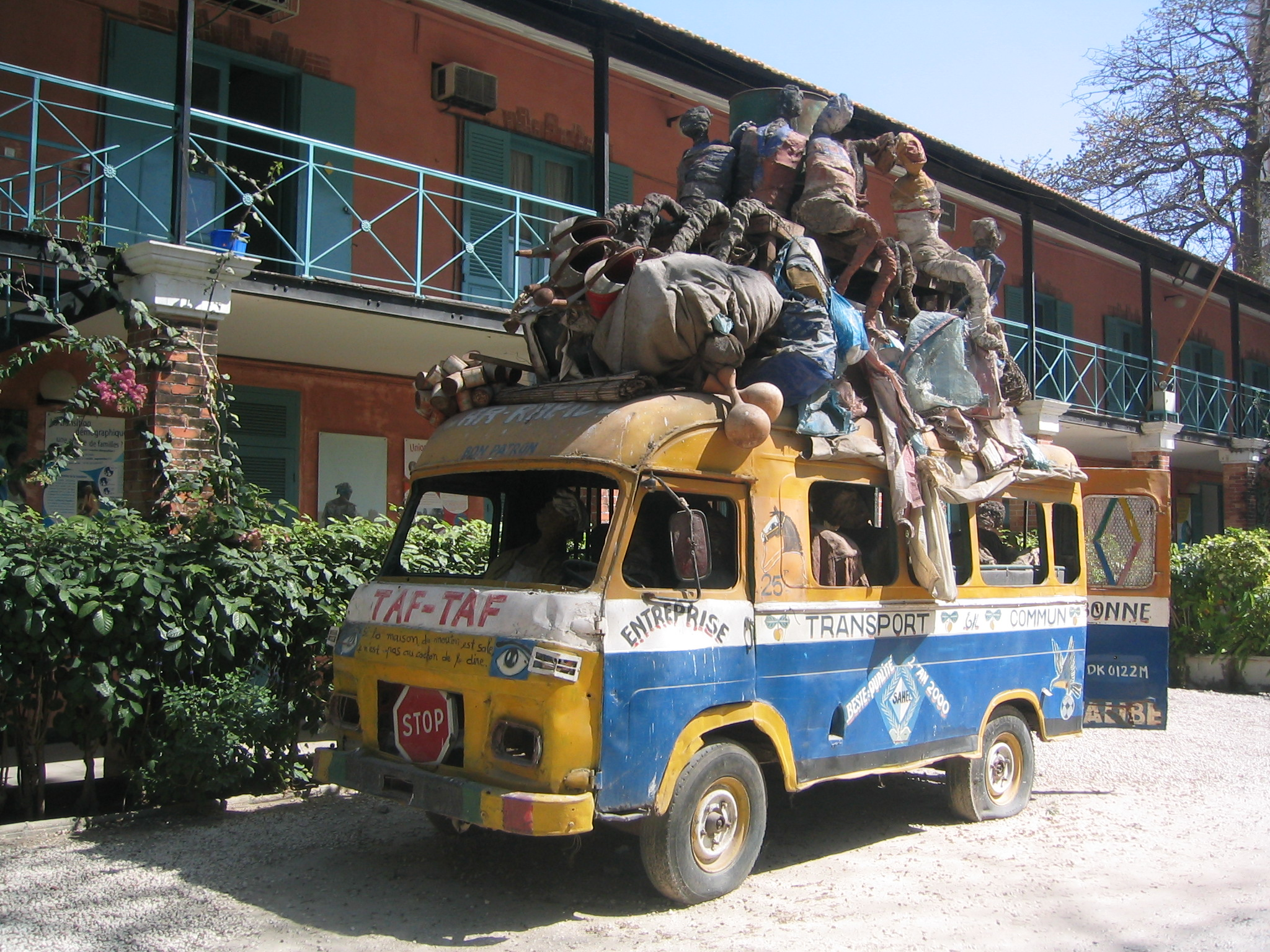
- Zinkpè's 2002 work Taxi Taf-Taf
- Born: 1969 (age 56–57); Cotonou, Benin
- Known for: Drawing, painting and sculpture
- Title: Contemporary African Artist
- Awards: Young African talent award

Dominique Zinkpe (born 1969, in Cotonou, Benin) is a contemporary African artist. He won an award from the West African Economic and Monetary Union in 2002 for "Malgie Tout!"

== Biography ==
Dominique Zinkpè was born in Cotonou, Benin, in 1969. He taught himself how to draw when he was young. His work was first logged at the Centre Culturel Français early in his career. Zinkpè's first exhibition was at the Chinese Cultural Center in Cotonou, and others awarded him "the status of Artist." He also represented Benin at the Grapholies exhibition in Abidjan, Ivory Coast.

== Career ==
Dominique specializes in plastic writing and works with a variety of media (installation, drawing, painting, sculpture, video). Zinkpè's paintings are inspired by his surroundings and the circumstances in which he finds himself. Zinkpè's paintings follow winding courses in which the protagonists, who are halfway between human and animal, evoke games of power, disguise, or sex, alluding to human comedy. On the canvas, he has a distinct style that is intimate, strong, and provocative. His sculptures are often made of coiled burlap or miniature merged wooden figurines.

== Awards ==
In 1993, he won the Prix Jeune Talent Africain (Young African Talent) Award at the Grapholie in Abidjan.

In 2002, at the Dakar Biennale he received the West African Economic and Monetary Union (UEMOA) Prize for his installation Malgie Tout.
