= Christian Lattier =

Ivorian sculptor

- Born: December 25, 1925; Grand Lahou, Ivory Coast
- Died: 23 April 1978 (aged 52); Abidjan, Ivory Coast
- Education: Écoles des Beaux-Arts, Saint-Etienne, École des Beaux-Arts de Paris
- Known for: Sculpture

Christian Lattier (1925–1978) was an Ivorian sculptor born in Grand Lahou, Ivory Coast.

== Biography ==
Christian Lattier is one of the most renowned artists from Ivory Coast, and was an elite sculptor of the mid-twentieth century. During his younger years, Lattier studied at the Catholic Mission in Abidjan in the Côte d'Ivoire. The "bare-handed sculptor", as some called him, emigrated from the Ivory Coast to France in 1935 for education purposes. At the age of 10 he attended the Marist Brotherhood of Saint-Chamond on the Loire, a Catholic school founded by Marcellin Champagnat.

In 1945 He began his studies in the Écoles des Beaux-Arts (School of Fine Arts), Saint-Étienne, at twenty-one years old. During his time in Saint-Étienne he was apprenticed under Henri Barthelemy, a master sculptor, and Joachim Durand, a modeler.

In 1947 he transferred to the École des Beaux-Arts de Paris where he studied sculpture and architecture under several notable masters of sculpture, architecture and wood carving. He emerged with an unprecedented dedication to modern sculpture, experimenting with new forms and unusual materials. He was soon acknowledged for his artistic ability and the distinct style of his works. He left the École des Beaux-Arts de Paris in 1956 and spent several years exhibiting before his return to Côte d'Ivoire following its independence from France in 1960.

He returned to the Côte d'Ivoire around 1961-62 to teach as a professor for sculptural art at the École Nationale des Beaux-Arts in Abidjan. He spent the rest of his years there until his unexpected death in 1978.

== Influences and impact ==
Christian Lattier's innovative style was a key factor in the development of modernism in sculpture in Côte d'Ivoire and France. With the Côte d'Ivoire being colonised by France from 1893-1960, he was influenced by centuries-old traditions in European and West African cultures. He was inspired by African masks and used string, wire and reddish colours in his sculptures. Throughout his lifetime he created over 3,000 designs, keeping his best pieces and destroying the rest. Lattier was very particular when it came to his sculptures; he would destroy his work and start again a multitude of times until it reached his desired quality. Lattier spent all his time working and researching to further better his craft. His hardworking nature was known and made an impression on those around him.

Nineteen pieces of Christian Lattier's sculptures are currently in the collection of Musée National de Côte d'Ivoire in Abidjan.

== Themes and style ==
Christian Lattier’s style was to use the traditional West African technique of weaving a mask around a centre of wire or tie it up with ideas derived mainly from European art and cultural history. Lattier worked with stone, wire, wood, and strong hemp fibre.

Lattier was a pioneer in modern sculpture in the Côte d'Ivoire and France. His never-before-seen style reinvented sculpture, which ultimately brought him many awards and success.

== Movement ==
He was a part of “The Short Century” which was an exhibition on independence and liberation movements in Africa between 1945-1994 that travelled to Munich, Berlin, Chicago, and New York from May 18, 2001 to July 29, 2001.

== Notable works ==
- 1954: Lattier's Le Panthere (The panther), won the Chevanard Prix at the "World Festival of Black Arts" in Dakar, where he introduced the use of string, when usually, candidates presented only plasterboard.
- 1957: Lattier collaborated with sculptor Roland Guillaumel and Georges Fabre in the exterior decoration of the Abidjan Town Hall.
- 1962: One of his most famous works was a statue named The Chicken Thief or the Victory of Samothrace. It was made with string and wire and is around 4.2 feet high.
- 1969: Lattier created a huge wall panel made of string displayed in the hall of the airport of Abidjan titled The three ages of Ivory Coast, along with a metal and a concrete sculpture titled Ivory Coast in the year 2000, and The Aviation, respectively.
- 1970: Lattier participated in the decoration of the building of the Price Stabilization Fund in Abidjan.
- 1975, Lattier created Mask, which garnered attention due to his use of traditional techniques that referred back to West African traditions.

=== Exhibitions ===
- 1958: Sorbonne, Paris, France
- 1959: 1st Biennale de Paris, in Musée d'Art Moderne de la Ville de Paris, France
- 1961: Salon de Comparaison, Paris, France.
- 1963: Exhibition at the City Hall of Abidjan, Ivory Coast
- 1965: Second exhibition in Ivory Coast
- 1966: Festival of Black Arts, Dakar, Senegal
- 1969: Festival de Algier, Algeria
- 1967: Universal Fair, Montréal, Canada
- 1975: Centre Culturel Français, Abidjan, Elfenbeinküste. Third exhibition in Ivory Coast
- 2001-02: "The Short Century. Independence and Liberation Movements in Africa 1945-94" curated by Okwui Enwezor for the Villa Stuck in Munich, shown also in Berlin, Chicago and New York
- 2004: "Dak'Art" 6th Edition of Dakar Biennial in Senegal
- 2007-08: "Black Paris - Black Brussels", curated by: Kerstin Pinther, Sigrid Horsch-Albert and Hanna Kiefer, held in Bayreuth between 26 Oct. 2006-11 Feb. 2007, in Frankfurt am Main between 13 Mar. 2007- 4 Nov. 2007 and in Brussels, Musée d'Ixelles between 27 Feb. - 27. Apr. 2008

=== Awards ===
- 1953: “Premier Prix des Cathedrales de France” during his living in France
- 1954: “Premier Prix Chenavard” for his work Le Panthere
- 1954: "Grand Prix" at the 1st World Festival of Black Arts
- 1960: "Premier Prix for sculpture of Asnières and the Gold medal of the city of Tavery"
- 1966: "World Grand Prix of Negro Arts"
- 1976: “Knight of the Order of the Republic of the Ivory Coast”

== Bibliography ==
- Bassori, TIMITE. "In Memoriam : Christian Lattier, Artiste Sculpteur Ivoirien." Présence Africaine, no. 107 (1978): 267-70. JSTOR 24350214.
- Brockman, Norbert C. (2006). "LATTIER, Christian". An African Biographical Dictionary (2 ed.). Grey House Publishing.
- "Christian LATTIER." Abidjan. Weblogy Group Ltd. Web. 17 Nov. 2014. <http://www.abidjan.net/qui/profil.asp?id=679 >.
- Clewing, Ulrich. "Nike of Samothrace Is the Chicken Thief." Culture Base. Culture Base, 2 July 2003. Web. 7 Nov. 2014. <https://web.archive.org/web/20100612235826/http://culturebase.net/artist.php?918>.
- Ravenhill, Philip L. "Côte d’Ivoire, République de." Grove Art Online. 2003; Accessed 21 Oct. 2019. https://www.oxfordartonline.com/groveart/view/10.1093/gao/9781884446054.001.0001/oao-9781884446054-e-7000019806.
- Vincent, Cédric. "Tendencies and Confrontations: Dakar 1966," Afterall: A Journal of Art, Context and Enquiry, no. 43 (Spring/Summer 2017): 88-101. doi:10.1086/692558
- Visonà, Monica Blackmun. "Redefining Twentieth Century African Art: The View from the Lagoons of Côte d'Ivoire." African Arts 38, no. 4 (Winter, 2005): 54-61,93-94. ProQuest 220986666.
- Yacouba Konate, Christian Lattier, Le sculpteur aux mains nues, Edition Sépia, 1993. ISBN 2-907888-23-4

== See also ==
- Contemporary African Art
- Culture of Ivory Coast
