= Paul Sika =

- Born: 7 January 1985 (age 41); Abidjan, Côte d'Ivoire
- Education: Software engineering at University of Westminster
- Known for: Photography

Paul Sika is an Ivorian fashion and advertising photographer/creative director/artist, who was born on 7 January 1985, in Abidjan, Côte d'Ivoire.

== Career ==
He studied software engineering at University of Westminster, United Kingdom between 2003 and 2007 and became a freelance photographer in 2008. In 2009 he was awarded a Chinua Achebe Center Fellowship.

His works consist of the vibrant views of Africa in Technicolor- saturation, they are in general oversaturated color shots. In his works; he creates carefully staged environments using actors.

When he discovered American artist Andy Warhol; he referred to himself as Warhol's grandson. He said ""When I saw LaChapelle's work, I thought, this is amazing. How can someone have such imagination? And when you go back in history, David LaChappelle was mentored by Andy Warhol. So it was more of the artistic-father thing, that's why I referred to myself as Andy Warhol's grandson."

As CNN World wrote; "Ivorian artist Paul Sika is no ordinary photographer. His "one-frame films" are eye-catching explosions of color, falling somewhere between cinema and photography. The influence of the big screen is obvious in Sika's photographs, which resemble stills from an ultra-stylish, slightly surreal movie shot in glorious Technicolor."

== Exhibitions ==
- November 2008 Galerie Le Lab, Abidjan
- October 2009 Chinua Achebe Center, New York

== Bibliography ==
- "At the Heart of Me" 8x10 inches, 80 pgs, ISBN 978-0-615-31362-7 (Hard Cover) / ISBN 978-0-615-31363-4 (Soft Cover)

== See also ==
- Contemporary African Art
- Culture of Côte d'Ivoire
