= Sandobele =

Women's society of the Senufo people, who practice divination

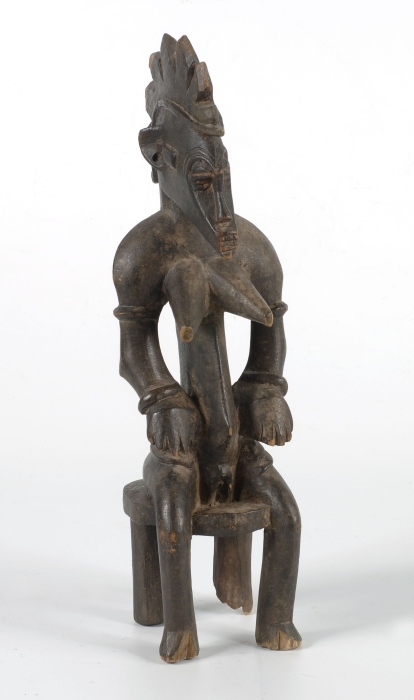
Wooden statue used during divination, dating before 1959

The Sandobele are members of the Sandogo, an authoritative women's society of the Senufo people, who practice divination. The Senufo inhabit the savannas and tropical rain forests of northern Côte d'Ivoire and the nearby land in Mali and Burkina Faso. The Sandogo is responsible for sustaining positive relationships with the spirit world through divination and for protecting the purity of each kinship group. The word Sandobele originates from the Senufo language.

The Sandobele constitute only a small portion of the members of the Sandogo society. Membership in the Sandogo society is almost exclusively hereditary as only one female from each matrilineal group is initiated into the Sandogo society. All new Sandogo initiates learn the process of divination called tyeli (or tyele), but only a small number are able to perfect the complicated method and become practicing diviners. Diviners have great responsibility and are highly respected within the community because of their skills.

The Sando (singular of Sandobele) divination process constitutes one of the most important and common rituals in Senufo culture. Leaders of the community must confer with a Sando diviner before making significant choices or performing sacred ceremonies that affect the community because the action must be communicated to the spirits. People in the village consult the diviner on an everyday basis to discover what spirits or other forces are causing them grief. Often villagers feel pressure to have regular sessions with the diviners to avoid neighbors and relatives claiming that misfortunes are caused by the villager not following the diviner's directions or not speaking with enough diviners. The Sandobele hold the authority to communicate with the spirit world which helps maintain a sense of balance with the male leaders of the society.

== Initiation ==
While the most common route to becoming a Sando is to be initiated through the society, other diviners are said to be “pursued” by a specific spirit. The person will fall ill due to a severe indiscretion committed against the spirit, and must then agree to work with that spirit as a diviner to become well again. In most areas, this must happen for a male to be allowed to practice divination; he will not be initiated into the Sandogo society although he is taught the divination process.

== Conflict ==
The underlying theme in Senufo daily activities and ritual practices is based on the conflict between the village and the bush. The village represents culture that is well-regulated and related to order and control, while the bush remains unpredictable, haphazard, and full of wild animals and mysterious creatures. The bush begins somewhere past the tobacco fields on the village edge, yet the boundary is always in flux, coming closer at night when bush spirits can cross the threshold of the village. The Senufo do not believe that they are automatically entitled to be able manipulate the land; they must first make gifts and sacrifices to the bush spirits to obtain the authorization to disturb their realm. Ancestors, diviners and other mediators are able to communicate with these spirits who dwell in the bush called madebele (or tugubele). The madebele are the most accessible spirits because of their proximity and relationship with humans.

== Madebele: the bush spirits ==
These spirits residing in the bush are constantly involved in human activities because they are able to move among the village at night and villagers sometimes must travel through the bush. The madebele remain dominant over their particular domains including sources of water such as springs, rivers and creeks as well as rocks and mountains. The bush spirits resemble small humans, but with feet pointing backwards, a disproportionately large head, stunted legs, big feet and oversized genitalia. They resemble humans in that they have male and female forms who marry, have children, form initiation societies, appear in pairs and live in similar groupings. They are invisible and speak a language unintelligible to humans. Their invisibility makes them easy to agitate because women need to obtain water, men must hunt wild animals and farmers must clear fields to plant crops. Like humans the madebele enjoy music and dancing and other beautiful objects such as sculpture and ornament. These spirits once held a place similar to humans in the world but were displaced to the bush.

=== Origin myth ===
The creator god Kolocolo created madebele and animals as the first residents of the earth; they enjoyed a peaceful existence and spoke the same language. At some point the madebele decided that they should be equal to Kolocolo and allowed to create new worlds, which made the creator god extremely angry. After this offense, the madebele were forced to remain on earth after their death, unseen by the new inhabitants created to rule over them as well as the animals. These new creatures were humans who looked very similar to the madebele except that their feet pointed forward. Humans appropriated the farming methods, social structures and initiation rites of the madebele. According to the Senufo historian Quattara, the humans proceeded to push the madebele and the animals into the bush which is why a hostile relationship exists between them. The bush spirits and animals are constantly struggling with mankind for supremacy. Once they enlisted the aid of sorcerers to give humans disease, war and misery, but humans called on the creator god for help and gained protection. The madebele can be very wily and often mislead humans, but they also gave them secret languages and initiation groups. Now the madebele will sometimes help humans, perhaps because they fear the creator god intervening. In this way people are able to negotiate with the bush spirits to influence their behavior.

=== As messengers ===
The madebele constitute the most important spiritual messengers because they are more accessible than the other deities. Unlike some as such as deebele, or evil spirits, the madebele are impartial; they are not inherently positive or negative and they can be persuaded to aid humans. These creatures can be exceedingly rash and become incensed quickly by humans, upon whom they can bestow hardship, sickness or even fatality. This situation, known as yawige, is feared dreadfully by the Senufo and requires the diviner to resolve the problem. Offerings must be made to the madebele with whom people come into contact or they will suffer retribution by the drying up wells and fires, among other disasters. Because madebele prefer to be around trees, offerings for them are often placed at the foot of trees. Anita Glaze's research maintains that bush spirits actually possess the means to give fecundity, vigor, riches, and authority to those who please them. On the other hand, Till Förster insists that madebele can only act as mediators between humans and other more powerful spirits who can bestow these gifts. Either way these creatures play a crucial role in the habitual routines of villagers and also in divination practices.

== Fo bracelet ==
The Sandobele are easily identified by the assortment of Fo bracelets they wear. These signify them as diviners and further appease the python deity. The python represents the most important motif in divination practices and the Fo bracelet is the first object purchased by a new Sando. The three designs on the bracelet relate to the basic life forces which in turn may illustrate that "Sando divination is the only route to health, vitality and life.” Fo is the principal conveyor of messages from the spirit world, and is thus a symbol for Sando divination as the mediator between humans and deities. Known as the “multicolored” one of “convertible elements” the python is the one who is able to answer the diviner's inquiries through the madebele. The diviner therefore must try to please him by wearing a beautifully crafted rendition of him on her person and on display in her chamber.

=== Mythology ===
An ancient story relates that once Fo changed himself into an attractive young man and was almost successful in misleading a young woman into a false marriage; an older woman, an elder, rescued her and the honor of the matrilineage was safeguarded. Through this tale, Fo is associated with sexual imagery, male and female relations, and the defensive function of the Sandogo.

=== Styles ===
The Fo bracelet takes several forms of which some are more finely decorated or have extra additions with the same basic structure. The bracelets are curved tubular forms that make an open cuff that are often divided into three sections. The most common includes a stylized representation of a python visible across all three sections of the form. This consists of two round circles representing eyes in the first section, a cylindrical bar on the second and a braided or smooth cord which wraps along the length of the bracelet. The tubular bar represents either the lungs or the male sex organ, while the braided cord represents arteries that lead to the heart that may or may not be represented on all bracelets. Other geometric patterns may also run along the entire piece. Sometimes a simple wavy line flows along the length of the bracelet similar to the way a snake appears as it slithers, instead of specific features. The objects are cast using brass alloy in the lost wax process and are therefore unique not reproducible. They are relatively small as they are either solid, thin tubes made to fit the wrist, somewhat larger props used as signifiers of power, or smaller replicas used as divination objects.

== Tyeli divination process ==
When a member of the village becomes aware of a specific problem or event in her life she will decide to consult one of the diviners to determine the origin of her discord by Sando divination She will go to the small chamber called the sandokpanagi in which the Sando conducts her business on certain days of the week. Various python motifs in bas-relief decorate the exterior of the house used only for this purpose. Upon entering the chamber the she will be inundated with a wide array of aesthetically pleasing objects including paintings of Fo on the walls, carved wooden sculptures, cast brass objects and substances from nature. The Sando diviner sits on the floor with her legs out and the client sits down facing her with her right leg next to the left leg of the diviner, thus forming a close mental and physical bond. The diviner wears many different python bracelets along with other pieces of jewelry. She holds a rattle made from a calabash, string and a white cowrie shell. Between her legs sits a pair of male and female sculptural figures, while a pile of various objects sits near her.

=== Calling the spirits ===
Now the client waits for the session to begin with a plea to the madebele.

“Answer to the invocation, you well-doers!

When someone comes to you, do all to help him.

The client has not come for me, but for you.

I do not know what lies heavy on his heart.

Say what problem oppresses him and show

What offering he must make to rid him of this.”

The whole divination chamber is designed to help call the bush spirits to the Sando; the invocation and music constitute the catalyst to call them forth. The spirits hear the music in the bush and feel compelled to come to the chamber to hear it as well as praise. The music makes them friendly and cooperative so the Sando can communicate with them as they possess the sculptures in front of her.

=== Establishing the problem ===
The diviner sets the objects for this process between her legs and gathers a haphazard group in the cup of her hands and sometimes one of the client's hands as well. The objects consist of small-scale brass jewelry (including a miniature python bracelet), miniature iron sculptures, cowrie shells, dried kola nuts, and other miscellaneous organic materials. The Sando mediator shakes the grouping of objects and tosses them before the figures between her legs. The relationship of how the objects land determines the message conveyed by the spirits; for example, when a cowrie shell with a smaller cowrie shell set inside it falls inside a python bracelet, it relates to pregnancy. Once the general category of the problem is determined, the spirits can be further questioned.

The diviner must continue to try to narrow down the specific conflict that is distressing the client. While taking the client's right hand in hers she will inquire about the situation aloud to the bush spirits who have taken residence within the figures. The Sando moves her hands in response to the spirits’ replies to her questions. Her hand will make a short horizontal gesture similar to pushing something aside to indicate “no” or a searching movement to indicate uncertainty. When the answer is “yes”, she slaps her upper thigh with her hand or the client's hand once or several times depending on how definite the response. No single answer is ever definite; the resolution comes from continually asking questions and getting related responses. During this time the patron listens silently until the Sando is able to determine the reason for her visit, to ensure that the spirits are cooperating. If she is able to determine the client's conflict, she will continue to use this method to access more information pertaining to the problem and its cause. If she fails, the client may ask to end the consultation. Once the source of discord is discovered, the diviner asks the spirits to explain what the client must do to correct the situation. The spirits guide the Sando's hand to one or more of the objects in the divination set that designates the course the client should follow. Depending on the situation this process may be very complicated and involve a series of questions before a conclusion can be reached. The client will now need to heed the advice of the Sando to resolve her problem.

== Yawige ==
One of the most common solutions to a client's difficulties involves having a specific type of ornamentation made for her to wear. These ornaments also called yawige (also yawiige, yawigii) are “anything worn as a protective, magical device prescribed for a client by a Sando” including cast-brass jewelry, painted textile clothing and masquerade costumes. The woman would need to go to the person in her village or the neighboring village who works as a brasscaster and solicit him to create the object stipulated by the diviner, such as a vörögö anklet worn only by women who have a special relationship with water spirits. The brass worker will cast the object and the client will wear this along with any other objects created to appease the spirits and resolve the issue. These objects are accumulated by the client and contribute to remembering the personal conflicts as well as a means of protection and ornamentation. Some of these objects are similar to those which the Sando keeps on her person or in her chamber.

== Divination kit ==
Although the objects utilized in tyeli divination can vary to some degree they always include a miniature python bracelet and other standard pieces. These objects can be divided into four major categories based on what they represent. The first group consists of different types of miniature forged-iron implements that are essential to the village's survival, including a farming hoe, a shovel for burials, a blade and an assortment of blacksmithing tools. The Fo bracelet falls into the second classification of objects which involves tiny representations of equipment related to the Sando divination process. For example, miniature Sandobele gourd rattles, twin cult baskets, stylized figurative forged-iron pairs and other items created in basketry, brass, iron, or wood are part of this grouping. Objects in the third group consist of nonrepresentational symbols typically constructed in fiber, metal and wood. A short iron bar bent on one end is interpreted as signifier of death and makes up part of this category. The fourth classification contains many organic materials that have a specific connotation such as large, shiny red and purple seeds and marked shells. All of these objects are essential to the tyeli process and make up part of the diviner's basic kit.

Not all Sandobele use the same objects, but rather try to make their own kit unique to the spirits with whom they communicate. Diviners who are just beginning and those with few clients often only have the bare essentials, but successful diviners may acquire many objects as well as decorations for their chamber. As they gain clientele, Sandobele are able to designate permanent meanings to a fixed number of new objects they obtain. On occasion the Sandobele may tell their client that the madebele insists that the client purchase a specific, “shiny” brass object before they can speak with him of his problems. These new more personal objects derive from communications with the helping madebele associated with that specific diviner. In addition, diviners add other unimportant objects to the kit in order to obscure the actual set from the client and confuse them. The Sandobele will add anything that draws their eye to the kit because of the item's color, texture or form. Using merely aesthetic objects in conjunction with the actual set, the diviners try to thwart the clients in any attempt to understand the tyeli method. The meaning of the objects comes from the position in which they fall and how this correlates with the other objects around them. Only the Sandobele are skilled in the art of reading the meaning of the connections between the objects. Currently diviners incorporate things such as ball point pens, bolts, nail polish and medicine flasks into their divination kits as objects of importance and visual worth. The divination sets are constantly reconfigured due to the plastic nature of the craft of tyele divination.

== Madebele: sculptures ==
The pair of carved wooden figures represents another essential component of the Sando divination process. A practicing diviner must have two or more of these figures called madebele like the spirits they represent, although the Senufo make a definite distinction between the two. These sculptures’ appearance must be similar to that of the individual spirits because they are used to attract the spirits to the diviner's chamber for consultation. Also, once the unseen spirits have been lured to the place, they reside inside the figures and “speak” to the diviner through the divination objects during the ritual. As with the other objects within the chamber, they are meant to be aesthetically pleasing to the spirits as well as functional. More successful diviners may have many sets of figures including more exquisitely carved figures that better relate to their particular madebele. The scale of the objects is similar to the divination objects reflecting an intimate relationship between the diviner and client. The figures are always displayed in male and female forms as they represent the spirits who come to the diviner as a pair. The female figure always stands slightly taller than the male, emphasizing the importance of women in the communication with spirits. These figures are an excellent example of how the formal and aesthetic qualities enhance the spiritual function of the sculptures. As with many of the other divination objects the pleasing visual appearance of the figures enables them to gratify and help call forth the spirits.
