= Mathilde Moraeau =

Ivorian painter (born 1958)

Mathilde Moreau
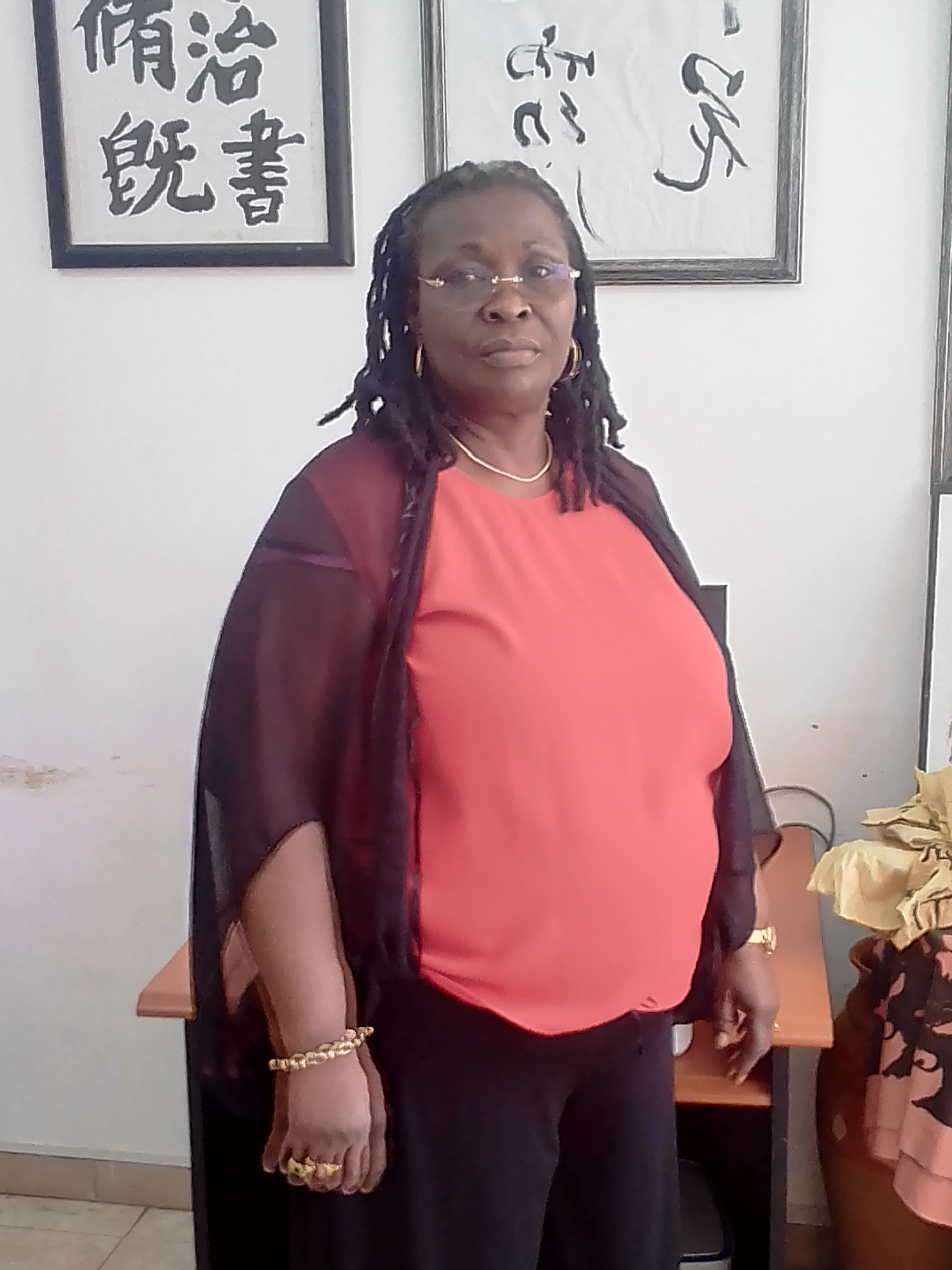
- Born: 2 March 1958 (age 68); Grand-Bassam, Ivory Coast
- Education: Ecole des Beaux-Arts d’Abidjan
- Known for: Painter, Director of l’Ecole Nationale des Beaux-Arts d’Abidjan

Mathilde Moreau is an Ivorian painter.

== Education and career ==
She studied at Ecole Nationale des Beaux Arts in Abidjan where she obtained a DCSA (Advanced Diploma of Fine Arts) in 1986.

In 1983–1994 she was a professor of Fine Arts at Harris School of Modern in Abidjan. Then worked as a professor of painting at Ecole Nationale des Beaux Arts in Abidjan between 1994 and 2006.

Between 2003 and 2005 she was a researcher at the Central Academy of Fine Arts in Beijing on Chinese traditional painting.

Since 2006, she has been the Director of the Ecole Nationale des Beaux Arts in Abidjan.

She was one of the precursors of the Vohou-Vohou movement born at L'Ecole des Beaux Arts of Abidjan in the 1970s. Vohou-Vohou is the refusal of using very expensive painting materials. Other precursors were: Yusuf Bath, Kra N'Guessan, Théodore Koudougnon, Mathilde Moreau.

== Group exhibitions ==
- 24 November – 8 December 1993 "Grafolies", Biennale d’Abidjan in Abidjan (Ivory Coast)
- 2 June – 9 July 1995 "Café des Artistes" in Lausanne, Switzerland
- 19–29 September 1996 "Biennial of Contemporary African Art", Museum of African Art of IFAN Cheikh Anta Diop (With 05 works selected)
- 16–31 August 1997 "Art Collection of the century from 1995 to 2000", Piotrkòw Trybunalski, Poland
- 5 June – 5 July 2008 Curated by Yacouba Konate at the headquarters of the BICICI the Plateau. The artists are; Abdoulaye Konate, Koffi Setordji, Ki Siriki, Michel Kodjo, Jean-Claude Henein, Mathilde Moreau, Youssouf Kourouma, Augustin Kassi, Jacoblen, Watt Kang, Mamery Ballo, Ange-Martial Shiner and Cherif Souleymane
- 20 September – 20 November 2008 African Artists in Residence at the Institute of Fine Arts Shenzhen

== Solo exhibitions ==
- 20 November – 15 December 1997 "Africa to the Heart" Paris, France
- January – March 2000 "African Art" in Beijing and Shanghai, China
- 20 November – 2 December 2000 "Return to China" at French Cultural Center Abidjan, Ivory Coast
- 13 March – 4 April 2004 Exhibition at the Cultural Center of Africa, Oslo, Norway

== Bibliography ==
- "Zeitgenössische Kunst aus Afrika: 14 Gegenwartskünstler aus Côte d’Ivoire und Bénin", Author: Thomas Fillitz, Böhlau, 2002, ISBN 978-3-205-99402-2, Product Dimensions: 25 x 17.9 x 3.4 cm, in German
