= Dakar Biennale =

Art exhibition in Dakar, Senegal

Dak'Art - Dakar Biennale Dak'Art - Biennale de l'Art Africain Contemporain
- Genre: biennale, focus on contemporary art and contemporary African art
- Begins: 1990 (literature), 1992 visual art
- Frequency: biennale, every two years
- Locations: Dakar, Senegal
- Founder: Senegalese government
- Organiser: General secretary of the Dakar Biennale

The Dakar Biennale, or Dak'Art - Biennale de l'Art Africain Contemporain, is a major contemporary art exhibition that takes place once every two years in Dakar, Senegal. Dak'Art's focus has been on Contemporary African Art since 1996.

== History ==
The Dakar Biennale was conceived in 1989 as a biennale alternating between literature and art. The first edition in 1990 was focused on literature and in 1992 on visual art. In 1993 the structure of the biennale was transformed and Dak'Art 1996 became an exhibition specifically devoted to Contemporary African Art. In 1998 the structure was consolidated and in 2000 there was considerable change: Abdoulaye Wade was elected president of Senegal a few months before the opening of the event. The new president confirmed the support of the Senegalese government for the event and since 2000, Dak'Art has taken place bi-annually. Dak'Art 2002 was characterized by new staff and new partners. Dak'Art 2004 received more international visitors and wider press coverage; during the opening the president announced his intention to organise a new edition of the World Festival of Black Arts. For the first time an artistic director was appointed for Dak'Art 2006 and the event was organised with the participation of many artists and a more consistent budget. In 2008 the biennale decelerated. The event took place on a smaller budget and was organised at the last minute. In 2010 the European Commission - a major financial partner - did not support the event. In December the third edition of the World Festival of Black Arts was organised in Dakar. The 2014 edition was curated by Abdelkader Damani, Elise Atangana and Ugochukwu-Smooth Nzewi. The 2016 and 2018 editions were both curated by Simon Njami.

Dak'Art is the African continent's longest running grand-scale art event. From 2000 onward, an artist eligible to the Exposition Internationale had to hold African citizenship, whether being born or a naturalized citizen of any of the countries in the continent. In 2014, it was opened to non-African nationals for the first time, with the exhibition 'Cultural Diversity' at the IFAN Theodore Monod Museum including invited internationals.

== Editions ==
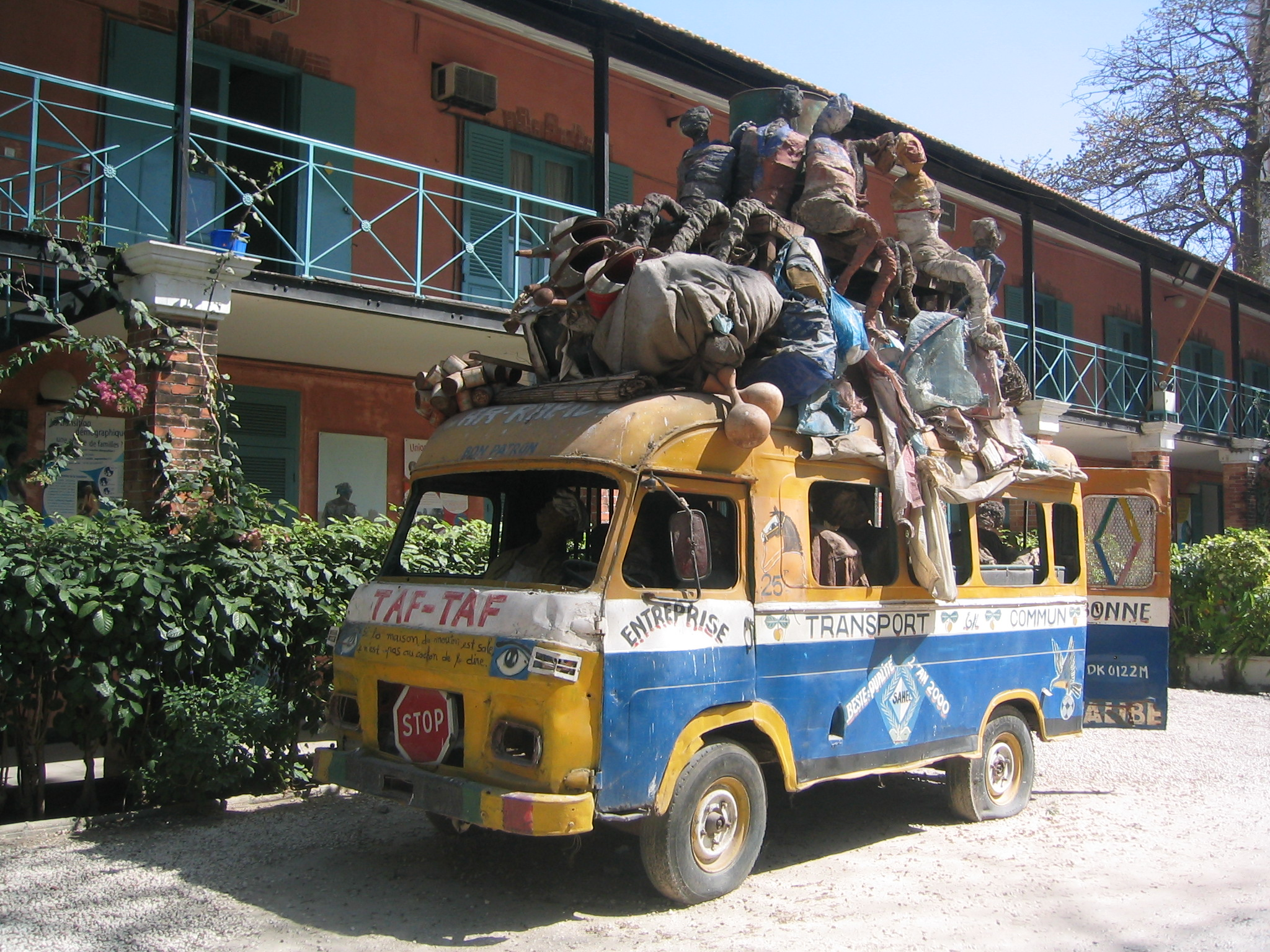
Taxi Taf-Taf by Dominique Zinkpè, Bénin presented at the Dak'Art 2002

- 1990 Dakar Biennale 1990. First edition focused on literature.
- 1992 Dak'Art 1992. First edition focused on visual art.
- 1996 Dak'Art 1996. First edition focused on Contemporary African Art.
- 1998 Dak'Art 1998. Third edition.
- 2000 Dak'Art 2000. Fourth edition.
- 2002 Dak'Art 2002. Fifth edition.
- 2004 Dak'Art 2004. Sixth edition.
- 2006 Dak'Art 2006. Seventh edition and first edition with an artistic director.
- 2008 Dak'Art 2008. Eighth edition.
- 2010 Dak'Art 2010. Ninth edition and twentieth anniversary.
- 2012 Dak'Art 2012. Tenth edition.
- 2014 Dak'Art 2014. Eleventh edition.
- 2016 Dak'Art 2016. Twelfth edition.
- 2018 Dak'Art 2018. Thirteenth edition.

== Bibliography ==
- Rasheed Araeen, DAK'ART - 1992-2002 in "Third Text", 17, n°. 1 (2003), p. 93.
- Ndiouga Benga, Mise en scène de la culture et espace public au Sénégal, 1960-2000, Université Cheikh Anta Diop, Dakar, 2008 (Ndiouga Benga, Mise en scène de la culture et espace public au Senegal. In: Africa Development, vol. 35, no. 4 (2010), p. 237-260)
- Mongo Beti, L'ETRANGE BIENNALE DE DAKAR... LETTRE OUVERTE A MONSIEUR LE MINISTRE DE LA CULTURE ET DE LA COMMUNICATION DU SENEGAL in "Peuples Noires Peuples Africains", n°. 63, 1988, p. 310-314.
- Nathalie Diserens Dubach, Eva-Maria Schädler, KUNST(T)RÄUME. Gespräche mit drei Künstlergruppen im Kontext der Biennale Dak'Art 2004 in Dakar, VDM, Verlag Dr. Müller, Saarbrücken, 2011.
- Youma Fall, La Biennale de Dakar: Impact sociale et culturel, Université Erfurt, Dicembre 01/12/2009.
- Elizabeth Harney, In Senghor's Shadow: Art, Politics, and the Avant-Garde in Senegal, 1960–1995, Duke University Press, Durham & London, 2004.
- Yacouba Konaté, Dak'art: Centralization Effects of a Peripheral Biennale presentato al Curating the Other – Curator as Tourist, Dartington College of Arts, Dartington, UK, Aprile 21, 2007.
- Yacouba Konaté, La biennale de Dakar: pour une esthétique de la création contemporaine africaine : tête à tête avec Adorno, L'Harmattan, 2009
- Iolanda Pensa, La Biennale di Dakar, tesi di laurea, relatore Luciano Caramel e correlatore Francesco Tedeschi, Università Cattolica di Milano, Laurea in lettere e filosofia, 2003 (CC-BY-SA).
- Cédric Vincent, Le grand défi de Dak'art, c'est l'élargissement de son public - entretien de Cédric Vincent avec Rémi Sagna in Africultures, dossier Festivals et biennales d'Afrique : machine ou utopie?
- Sabrina Moura, "De volta para onde nunca estive": arte africana e diáspora na Bienal de Dacar (1992-2012). Unicamp, 2021.

== See also ==
- Contemporary African Art
- World Festival of Black Arts
