= Frédéric Bruly Bouabré =

Ivorian artist

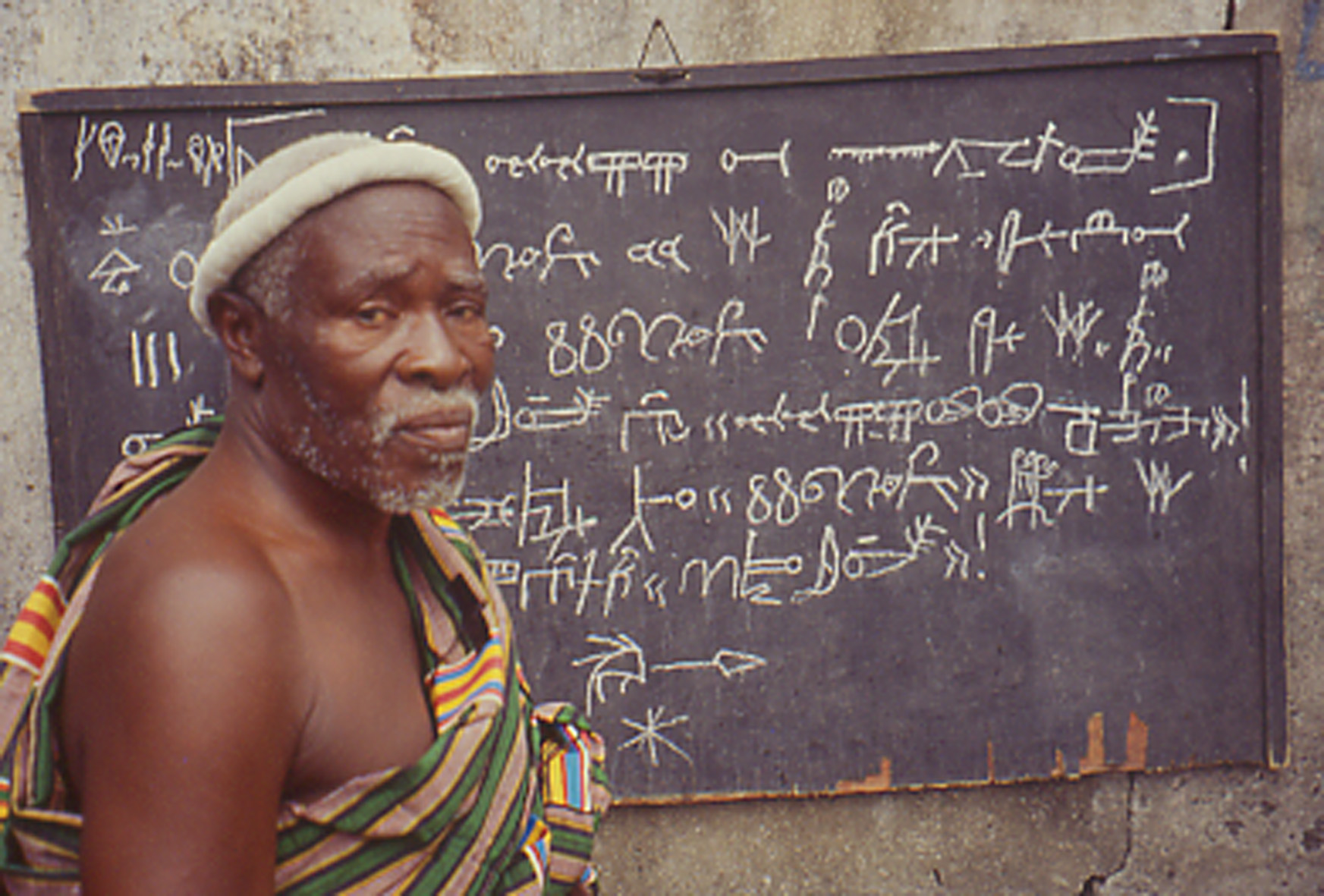
- Born: 11 March 1923; Zépréguhé, Ivory Coast
- Died: 28 January 2014 (aged 90); Abidjan, Ivory Coast
- Known for: Drawings

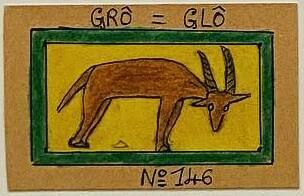
GRO=GLO N°146

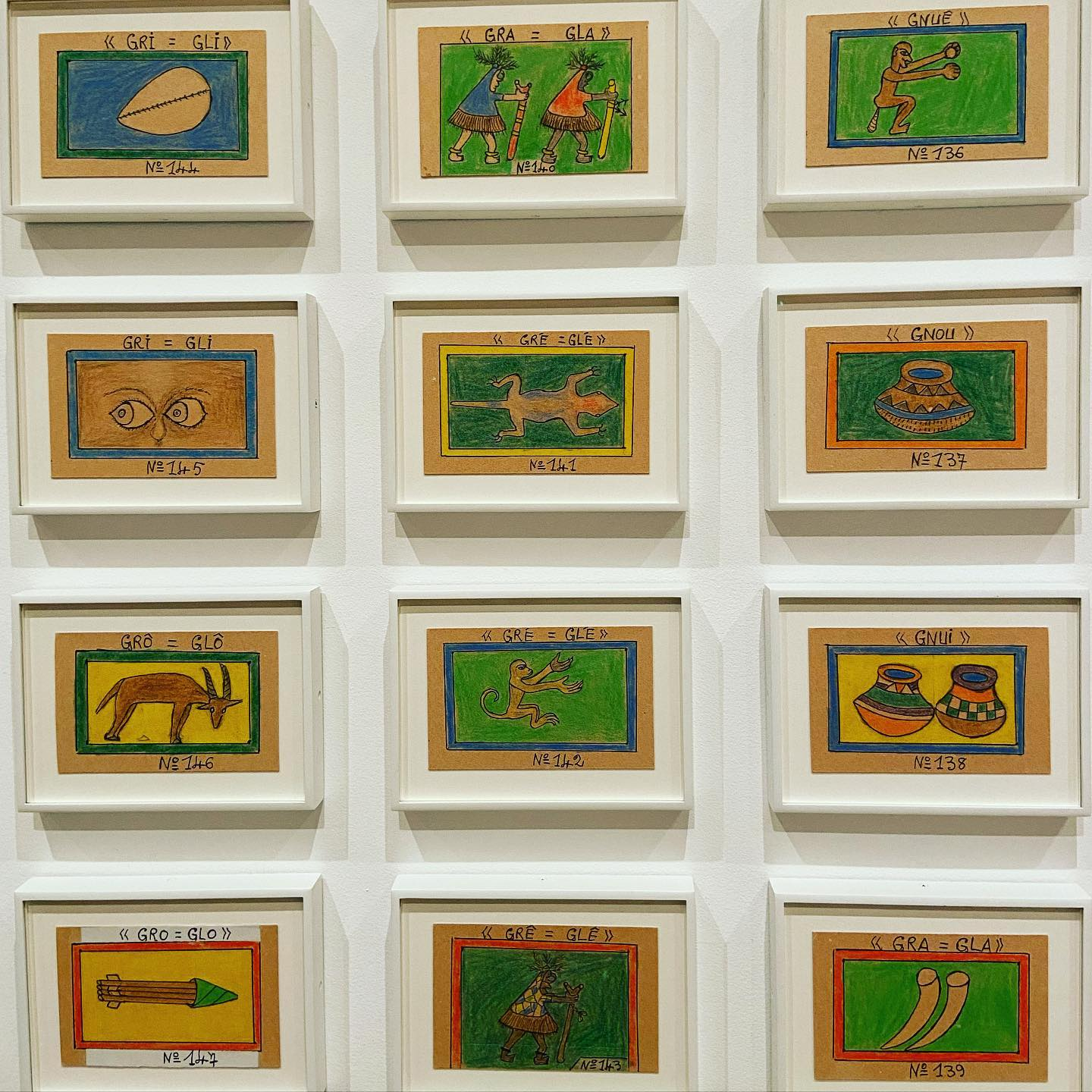

Frédéric Bruly Bouabré, also known as Cheik Nadro (11 March 1923 – 28 January 2014), was an Ivorian artist.

== Life and career ==
Bouabré was born in Zépréguhé, Ivory Coast, and was among the first Ivorians to be educated by the French colonial government. On 11 March 1948, he received a vision, which directly influenced much of his later works. Bouabré created many of his hundreds of small drawings while working as a clerk in various government offices. These drawings depicted many different subjects, mostly drawn from local folklore; some also described his own visions. All the drawings are part of a larger cycle, titled World Knowledge. Bouabré also created a 448-letter, universal Bété syllabary, which he used to transcribe the oral tradition of his people, the Bétés. His visual language is portrayed on some 1,000 small cards using ballpoint pens and crayons, with symbolic imagery surrounded by text, each carrying a unique divinatory message and comments on life and history.

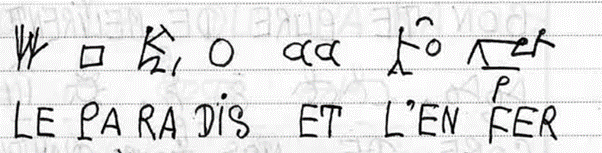

Many of Bouabré's drawings are in The Contemporary African Art Collection (CAAC) of Meshac Gaba. One of his emblematic drawings is saved in the L'appartement 22 collection on the African continent: "Une divine peinture relevée sur le corps d'une mandarine jaunie", made by Bouabré in 1994 in Abidjan.

== Exhibitions ==
- 2022: Frédéric Bruly Bouabré: World Unbound, Museum of Modern Art, New York
- 2017: Frédéric Bruly Bouabré & Serge Attukwei Clottey, Burning in Water, New York
- 2013: Venice Biennale, Italy
- 2012: Inventing the world: the artist as citizen, Biennale Bénin, Cotonou, Bénin
- 2010–2011: Tate Modern, London, UK
- 2010: African Stories, Marrakech Art Fair, Marrakech
- 2007: Frédéric Bruly Bouabré, Ikon Gallery, Birmingham, UK
- 2007: Why Africa?, Pinacoteca Giovanni e Marella Agnelli, Turin, Italy
- 2006: 100% Africa, Guggenheim Museum, Bilbao, Spain
- 2005: Arts of Africa, Grimaldi Forum, Monaco, France
- 2004–2007: Africa Remix, the touring show started on 24 July 2004 at the Museum Kunst Palast in Düsseldorf (Germany), and travelled to the Hayward Gallery in London, the Centre Georges Pompidou in Paris and the Mori Art Museum in Tokyo.
- 2003: Frédéric Bruly Bouabré, Musée Champollion, Figeac, France
- 2002: Documenta 11, Kassel, Germany
- 2001–2002: The Short Century was an exhibition held in Munich, Berlin, Chicago and New York, organised by a team headed by Nigerian curator Okwui Enwezor
- 1996: Neue Kunst aus Africa, Haus der Kulturen der Welt, Berlin, Germania
- 1995: Galerie des Cinq Continents, Musée des arts d’Afrique et d'Océanie, Paris, France
- 1995: Dialogues de Paix, Palais des Nations, Geneve, Switzerland
- 1994: Rencontres Africaines, the touring exhibition was shown at the Institut du Monde Arabe in Paris, Cidade do Cabo in Sud Africa, Museum Africa in Johannesburg and in Lisbon, Portugal
- 1994: World Envisioned, together with Alighiero Boetti, the exhibition was shown in DIA Center for the Arts in New York and American Center, Paris, France
- 1993: Trésor de Voyage, Biennale di Venezia, Venice, Italy
- 1993: Azur, Fondation Cartier pour l'Art Contemporain in Jouy-en-Josas, France
- 1993: La Grande Vérité: les Astres Africains, Musée des Beaux-Arts in Nantes, France
- 1993: Grafolies, Biennale d’Abidjan in Abidjan, Ivory Coast
- 1992: A Visage Découvert, Fondation Cartier pour l'Art Contemporain in Jouy-en-Josas, France
- 1992: Oh Cet Echo!, Centre Culturel Suisse, Paris, France
- 1992: Out of Africa, Saatchi Collection, London
- 1992: L'Art dans la Cuisine, St. Gallen, Sweden
- 1992: Resistances, Watari-Um for Contemporary Art, Tokyo, Japan
- 1991: Africa Hoy/Africa Now, the touring exhibition has shown in Centro de Arte Moderno in Las Palmas de Gran Canaria (Spain), Gröninger Museum in Groningen (Netherlands), Centro de arte Contemporaneo, Mexico City
- 1989: Magiciens de la Terre, Centre Georges Pompidou and Grande halle de la Villette, Paris, France
- 1989: Waaah! Far African Art, Courtrai, Belgium
- 1986: L'Afrique e la Lettre, Centre Culturel Français, Lagos, Nigeria

== See also ==
- Bété alphabet
- Bété languages
- Contemporary African Art
- Culture of Côte d'Ivoire

== Galleries ==
- Kyo Noir – Contemporary African Art Investment
- African Contemporary | Contemporary African Art Gallery
- Frédéric Bruly Bouabré: A childlike world of goodness and colour –
- Richard Dorment, "Frédéric Bruly Bouabré: A childlike world of goodness and colour" (review), Daily Telegraph, 4 September 2007.
