= Contemporary African art =

Art made by Africans or their descendants in the post-colonial era

Contemporary African art is commonly understood to be art made by artists in Africa and the African diaspora in the post-independence era. However, there are about as many understandings of contemporary African art as there are curators, scholars and artists working in that field. All three terms of this "wide-reaching non-category [sic]" are problematic in themselves: What exactly is "contemporary", what makes art "African", and when are we talking about art and not any other kind of creative expression?

The research of Lindén Henrik analyzed reviews of contemporary African art from 1990 to 2014 and sought to uncover the underlying discourses of power and ideology. He points out the art critic is a component of a larger system that creates and re-creates knowledge about Africa and African culture. Western scholars and curators have made numerous attempts at defining contemporary African art since the 1990s and early 2000s and proposed a range of categories and genres. They triggered heated debates and controversies, especially on the foundations of postcolonial critique. Recent trends indicate a far more relaxed engagement with definitions and identity ascriptions. The global presence of African scholars and contemporary artists in the full discourse of global production has become a widely acknowledged and beyond the pressure of self-justification.

== Scope ==
Although African art has always been contemporary to its producers, the term "contemporary African art" implies a particular kind of art that has conquered, or, as some would say, has been absorbed by the international art world and art market since the 1980s. It is in that decade when Europe and the United States became aware of art made in Africa by individual artists, thus breaking with the colonial tradition of assuming collective "ethnic" origins of so-called "tribal art" as found in most ethnographic collections. The exhibition Magiciens de la terre by Jean-Hubert Martin in 1989 is widely considered (but also challenged as) a key exhibition in this very recent history of international reception of African and other non-western art. However, this reception, too, has its roots in an exotic and mystifying view on African culture from a dominant western position, as Rasheed Araeen argued in his response to Magiciens de la terre.

Therefore, although this exhibition and many that followed had a strong influence in creating a kind of a common understanding of what constitutes contemporary African art, it is true that it has been and still is subject to discussions and controversies. Almost every exhibition following Magiciens de la terre offered a taxonomy or system of categorization that helped to reflect the very notion of contemporary African art, but they failed to recognize the postcolonial need of giving up the Eurocentric epistemology.

Contemporary African art is believed to feature particularities typical to African aesthetics, while at the same time it shares properties with other international contemporary arts. Therefore, it is both, shaped by and feeding into the globalizing art worlds and art markets, like any other contemporary art. At the same time, there are a lot of contemporary art practices and forms in African regions and cities that are almost exclusively locally known. While meeting all three requirements of being contemporary, art, and African, they fail to fit into a certain type of art production that has been spreading on the international art market since at least the 1980s.

Exhibitions variously showed work by artists based in Africa; by artists using aesthetics typical to African traditions; by African artists living in the West but including aesthetics and topics related to their "roots"; traditional artworks related to customary practices such as rituals; and urban African art that reflects the modern experience of cultural pluralism and hybridity. Modernity as a colonial and postcolonial experience appears as an intrinsic and significant attribute in most conceptions of contemporary African art. Scholars and curators therefore have proposed a wide range of taxonomies that tried firstly to define what is African about this art, and secondly, the range of genres it covers. Diverse attempts to define particular genres of contemporary African art, however, mirrored the fascination of art scholars and curators for the appropriation of cultural elements from assumed "Western" into "African" modes of expression and traditions.

== Attempts to define genres of contemporary African art ==
One example is Marshall W. Mount, who proposed four categories: first, "survivals of traditional styles", which show continuities in traditional working material and methods such as bronze casting or wood carving; secondly, art inspired by Christian missions; thirdly, souvenir art in the sense of tourist or "airport art", such as by the likes of artworks by South African visual artist Ezequiel Mabote, as defined later by Jules-Rossette; and finally, an emerging art requiring "techniques that were unknown or rare in traditional African art". Valentin Y. Mudimbe, in turn, proposes to think of three currents, rather than categories, namely a "tradition-inspired" one, a "modernist" trend, and "a popular art", whereby Mount's categories would be situated somewhere "between the tradition-inspired and the modernist trend". Similar to other categorizations, this proposal considers the education of the artists as well as the envisaged clientele/patrons as important factors for the respective "currents". In the exhibition catalogue of Africa Explores (1991), curator Susan Vogel distinguished between "traditional art", "new functional art", "urban art", "international art", and "extinct art". Rejecting these categories, collector André Magnin proposed grouping similar works into sections named "territory", "frontier" and "world" in his survey book Contemporary African Art, thus placing them into "imaginary maps". However, this approach was also criticized by Dele Jegede, with convincing arguments against its ethnocentric perspective. Among other things, Jegede pointed to the hubris of attempts to talk about art of a whole continent, but also to the common reflex to exclude Northern Africa from such considerations and to follow a global, rather than "particularistic focus on the study of the art of the continent" that would provide more specific and deeper bodies of knowledge. In the 1990 exhibition Contemporary African Artists: Changing Tradition, the Studio Museum in Harlem tried to take the perspective of the presented artists and distinguished between African artists who refuse outside influences; African artists who adopt modes of Western art; and African artists who fuse both strategies.

Common to all these categorizations is their reliance on dichotomies between art and craft, Europe and Africa, urban and rural, and traditional and contemporary. These dichotomies tend to consider mutual influences in African and European art as an exception, rather than the norm. Moreover, they fail to think of African art independent from Europe as its counterpart or "influence", resulting in a frequent reproach of African artists "copycatting" or "mimicking" European achievements of modernism. Such Eurocentric attitudes have been revealingly criticized by theorists such as Olu Oguibe, Rasheed Araeen, Nkiru Nzegwu, Okwui Enwezor or Salah M. Hassan. This problem is not easy to solve, and in some cases, it is tackled by simply subverting any attempt at categorization.

The exhibition Seven Stories about Modern Art in Africa, directed by Clémentine Deliss and curated by Chika Okeke-Agulu, Salah M. Hassan, David Koloane, Wanjiku Nyachae and El Hadji Sy (London, 1995) is a case in point. Rather than grafting binary taxonomies, the show narrated seven modern art histories in different parts of Africa by invited curators and artists who were familiar with these recent histories and their respective art scenes. The exhibition proved to offer a highly complex, historically informed and well-researched presentation.

Another example for subverting binary taxonomies is the book Contemporary African Art after 1980 by Okwui Enwezor and Chika Okeke-Agulu. Rather than putting contemporary African art in relation to Western traditions, they contrast it with modern African art, in that it defies linear grand narratives of modernism and is radically postcolonial. "[F]irst, within categories of time, it is neither belated nor does it exist out of time; second, because it is post-historical, it did not emerge out of a succession of historical styles; third, because it is critical of colonial valorization of an authentic past, it is postcolonial; and fourth, in relation to its post-colonialism, it seeks, according to Hans Belting's thesis, to be post-ethnic […]. Neither being out of time nor belated, contemporary African art strategically inhabits a third epistemological space by being in time." As they add, this being "fundamentally of its time" counts for all contemporary art, not only the African. In their book, Enwezor and Okeke-Agulu discuss contemporary African art by its approaches and guiding topics, rather than trying to define categories on the basis of styles, markets or traditions. Their chapters therefore are designated as "Between postcolonial utopia and postcolonial realism", "Networks of practice" in the globalized field of cultural production, "Politics, culture and critique", "Archive, document, memory", "Abstraction, figuration and subjectivity" and "The body politic: difference, gender, sexuality". In doing so, they locate contemporary African art within a historical perspective, something that had largely been missed in previous discussions.

== African digital art and artists ==
Digital art has been defined in different ways. For instance, Lizelle Bisschoff defines it as "artistic work or practice that uses digital technologies as an essential part of the creative and/or presentation, dissemination and exhibition process". Such works include, among others, audio-visual production, animation, interactive projects, websites, filmmaking, graphic art, and design. And such practices include, among others, net art, digital installation art, virtual reality, and digitized forms of painting, drawing, sculpture, photography, music, etc. When applied to or exhibited in and on Africa, they constitute what is referred to as African Digital Art. Below are some artists who can be regarded as African digital artists.

- Semilore Stef Ogunsanya (born 1998) is a Nigerian visual artist. She specializes in sculpture.
- Tatenda Ndove is a digital illustrator and a character designer from Zimbabwe. She has experience as a digital painter, book illustrator, comic book artist, and colorist. Ndove spent three years pursuing her studies in fine art at the National Art Gallery of Zimbabwe Visual Art School.
- Bassey Effiong Ndon is a multi-talented Nigerian painter, experimental artist, and digital artist. He has worked with African symbols, dance culture, and societal critiques over the years. Being a fan of music and the digital technology, he focuses his work on musical themes and creative emotions. He has recently been exploring the use of digital media to understand African art. His study into the digital media brings a new vigour in the visual portrayal of African art, incorporating several motivating themes and social commentaries to voice his opinions.
- Puleng Mongale is a South African photographer and digital artist born in Soweto in 1991, whose interest in photography was sparked in 2019. Her work in digital collaging has been popularized and continues to be a work of expression for Mongale.

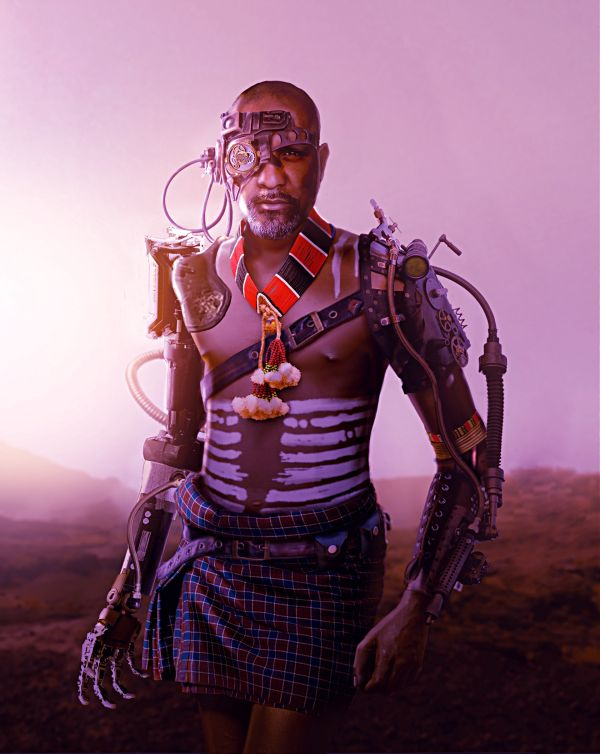
"Serengeti Cyborg" by Fanuel Leul. Leul's works combine elements of African tradition and futuristic ideas.

- Fanuel Leul is an African digital artist based in Addis Ababa, Ethiopia. His work is focused on the concept of Afrofuturism, which contrasts African traditions with the futuristic world. He has digitally created many advanced works of art highlighting a very futuristic layout with elements of African tradition.
- Wanjiku Nyachae has worked in the art world for more than twenty-five years, offering mental health and well-being support through digital art. She is a strong believer that art has the capacity to change lives. She is the founder of Cascade SciArts, an organization dedicated to creating evidence-based interventions to elevate mood. Nyachae's work mainly consists of live music, projections and VR visuals that stimulate uplifting hallucinogens in her clients.
- Freddie Jacob from Nigeria is a queer woman who uses various parts of her intersectionality to create her own NFTs. She often utilizes themes that typically deal with female empowerment, love and relationships. She has been an active artist and creator since 2020.
- Safina Kimbokota (born 1982) is an artist from Tanzania.

== Exhibitions ==
1962

- Art from the Commonwealth, Commonwealth Institute, Kensington, London, 1962.

1966

- Tendances et Confrontations. Musée Dynamique, Dakar (1–24 April 1966), within the World Festival of Black Arts.

1967

- Contemporary African Art. Transcription Centre, London, 1967.

1969

- Contemporary African Art, Studio International, London and New York, 1969. Camden Arts Centre, London, 1969.
- Contemporary African Art. Otis College of Art and Design, Los Angeles, 1969.

1974

- African Art Today: Four Major Artists. African-American Institute, New York, 1974.
- Contemporary African Art, Museum of African Art, Washington D.C., 1974.
- Contemporary African Arts, Field Museum of Natural History, Chicago, 1974. Curated by Maude Wahlman, National Museum of African Art, Chicago (20 April–3 November 1974).

1977

- African Contemporary Art, The Gallery, Washington, D.C., 1977. Curated by Kojo Fosu, The Gallery of Art, Howard University, Washington, D.C. (30 April–31 July 1977).

1978

- Christliches Africa: Kunst und Kunsthandwerk in Schwarzafrika. Curated by Josef Thiel, Haus Völker und Kulturen, St. Augustine, 1978.

1979

- Moderne Kunst aus Afrika im Rahmen des West-Berliner Festivals Horizonte Festival der Weltkulturen (Nr. 1, 1979). Eine Ausstellung der Berliner Festspiele mit Unterstützung der Staatliche Kunsthalle, Berlin, 1979 (title on the cover Kunst aus Africa). Curated by Sabine Hollburg and Gereon Sievernich, Staatliche Kunsthalle, Berlin (24 June–12 August 1979); same exhibition with the title Moderne Kunst in Afrika, Terra, Zutphen, 1980. Curated by Harrie M. Leyten and Paul Faber, Tropenmuseum, Amsterdam (1980); with the title Art from Africa at Commonwealth Institute, London (1981). The exhibition was also presented in Frankfurt/Main (Paulskirche) during the Frankfurt Bookfair and in Stockholm.

1984

- L'art en Afrique est la vie: Paul Ahyi & El loko aus Togo, Galerie Altana, Hamburg, 1984 (3–18 November 1984).
- Sanaa: Contemporary Art from East Africa. Curated by Fatmah Abdellah, Mordecai Buluma, Elimo Njau, Commonwealth Institute, London (1984).

1985

- Tributaries: A View of Contemporary Southern African Art, BMW Communications Department, 1985. Curated by Richard Burdett, Africana Museum, Johannesburg, Germany.

1986

- From Two Worlds. Co-curator Nicholas Serota, Whitechapel Art Gallery (1986).

1987

- L'art Naïf Africain, Musée d'Art Naïf - Max Fourny, Paris, 1987. In collaboration with Le Centre Culturel Français d'Abidjan, Musée d'Art Naïf - Max Fourny, Paris (11 September–11 November 1987).
- Ethnicolor, Paris, 1987. Curated by Bruno Tilliette & Simon Njami. Ethnicolor, Autrements, Paris, 1987. Catalogue with essays by Bruno Tilliette, Simon Njami, Jean-Loup Pivin, Pierre Gaudibert.

1988

- Venice Biennal (Aperto 88) International Exiption, Fathi Hassan.
- June 1988).
- Art pour l'Afrique: Exposition internationale d'art contemporain. Musée National des Arts Africains et Océaniens, Paris (08/06–25 July 1988).
- Kunst uit een andere wereld (Art from another world), Snoeck-Ducaju & Zoon, Rotterdam, 1988. Curated by Paul Faber, Museo di Etnologia, Rotterdam (4 November 1988 – 13 February 1989).
- Art contemporain arabe: collection du Musée du l'Institut du Monde Arabe, Institut du Monde Arabe, Paris, 1988. Curated by Brahim Alaoui, Institut du Monde Arabe, Paris (1988).

1989

- Bild/konst i södra Afrika (Art/Images in Southern Africa), edited by Christina Bjork, Kerstin Danielson and Bengt Serenander, Riksutställninger, Kulturhuset, Stoccolma, 1989. Curated by Kerstin Danielsson, Kulturhuset & Kulturhuset, Stoccolma (19 May–24 September 1989); itinerant in Sweden and in Scandinavian countries until May 1990.
- Magiciens de la terre, Editions du Centre Pompidou, Paris, 1989. Curated by Jean-Hubert Martin, in collaboration with Jacques Soulillou, André Magnin, Aline Luque, Centre Pompidou, Paris (18 May–14 August 1989).
- Croisement de Signes, Institut du Monde Arabe, Paris, 1989. Curated by Mohamed Métalsi (24 April–15 August 1989).
- The Other Story: Afro-Asian Artists in Post-War Britain, Hayward Gallery, London, 1989. Curated by Rasheed Araeen, Hayward Gallery, Southbank Centre, London (1989).
- Contemporary Art from the Islamic World, edited by Wijdan Ali in collaboration with Suhail Bisharat, Scorpion Publishing on behalf of the Royal Society of Fine Arts, Amman, London, 1989. Curated by Wijdan Ali, Barbican Concourse Gallery, London.

1990

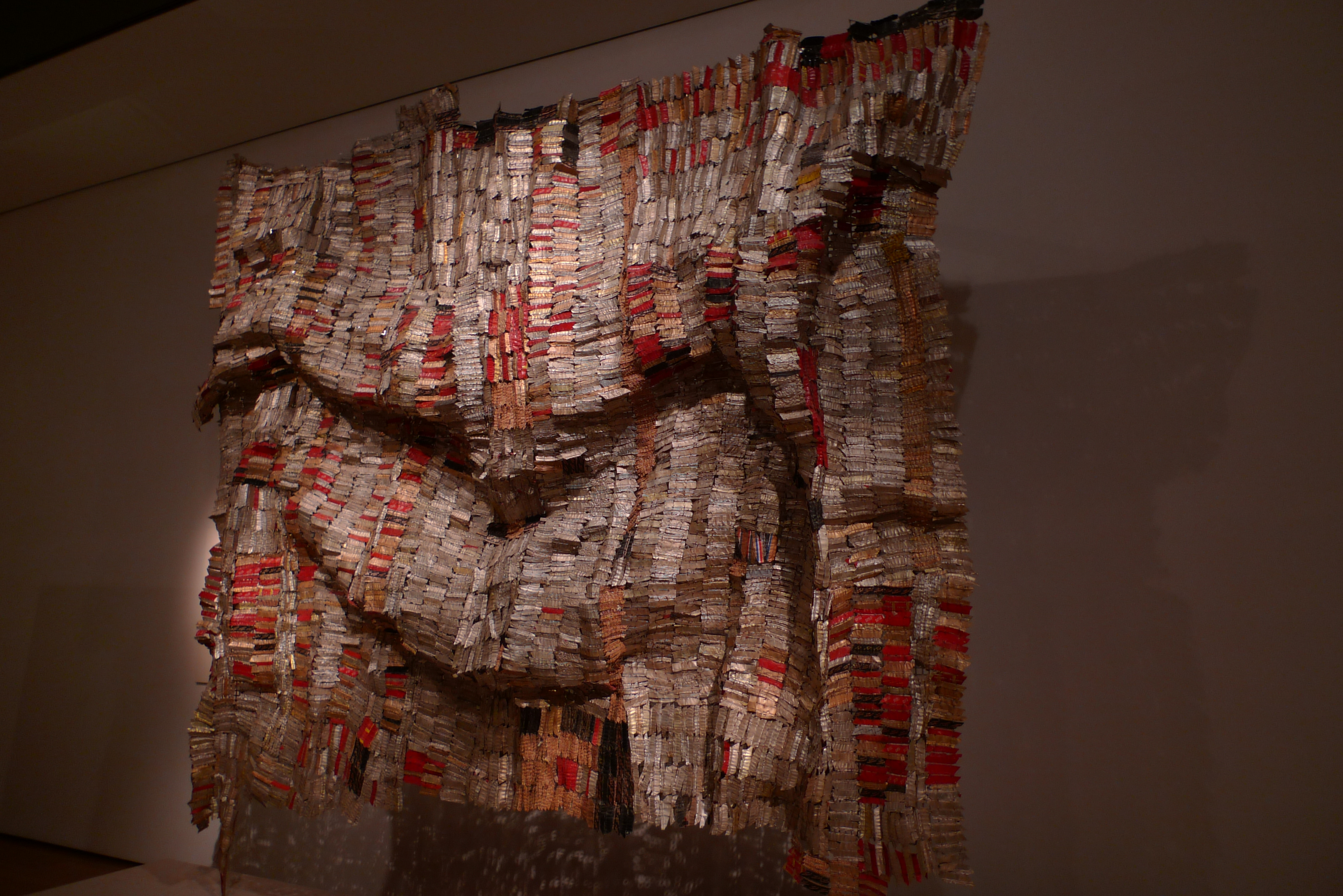
Man's Cloth by El Anatsui (1998–2001), on display at the British Museum.

- Lotte or the Transformation of the Art Object, Grazer Kunstverein & Accademia d'Arte, Vienna, 1990. Curated by Clémentine Deliss.
- Art from the Frontline: Contemporary Art from South Africa, Angola, Botswana, Mozambique, Tanzanian, Zambia, Zimbabwe, Frontline States, London: Karia Press, 1990. Curated by Peter Sinclair and Emma Wallace, Glasgow Art Gallery and Museum (esposizione itinerante in Gran Bretagna).
- Contemporary African Artists: Changing Traditions, El Anatsui, Youssouf Bath, Ablade Glover, Tapfuma Gutsa, Rosemary Karuga, Souleymane Keita, Nicholas Mukomberanwa, Henry Munyaradzi, Bruce Onobrakpeya, the Studio Museum in Harlem, New York, 1990. Curated by Grace Stanislaus, the Studio Museum in Harlem, New York.
- Wegzeichen: Kunst aus Ostafrika 1974–89 [Signs: Art From East Africa 1974–1989], Museum für Völkerkunde, Frankfurt-am-Main, 1990. Curated by Johanna Agthe.

1991

- Africa Explores: 20th Century African Art, Center for African Art, New York / Prestel-Verlag, Munich, 1991. Curated by Susan Vogel in collaboration with Ima Ebong, The Centre for African Arts, New York (1991); University Art Museum di Berkeley; Dallas Museum of Art; Saint Louis Art Museum; Mint Museum of Art di Charlotte; The Carnegie Museum of Art di Pittsburgh; The Corcoran Gallery of Art di Washington D.C.; The Center for Fine Arts di Miami; Lüdwig; Forum für Internationale Kunst di Aachen, Germany (1993); Fundació Antoni Tàpies di Barcellona (1993); Espace Lyonnais d'Art Contemporain di Lyon (1994); Tate Gallery, Liverpool (1994).
- Africa Hoy/Africa Now: Jean Pigozzi Collection. Curated by André Magnin, Centro Atlantico de Arte Moderno, Las Palmas de Gran Canaria (17 September–17 November 1991); Groninger Museum, Groningen, Olanda (7 December–9 February 1992), Centro Cultural de Arte Contemporaneo, Mexico City (20 February–7 June 1992); Out of Africa, Saatchi Gallery, London, 1993.
- Art and Ambiguity: Prospectives on the Brenthurst Collection of Southern African Art, Johannesburg Art Gallery, Johannesburg, 1991.
- Mit Pinsel und Meissel, Zeitgenössische afrikanische Kunst [Signs of the Time: New Art from Africa], Museum für Volkerkunde, Frankfurt am Main, 1991. Curated by Joanna Agthe and Christina Mundt, Museum für Völkerkunde, Frankfurt am Main (26 April 1991 – 19 April 1992).
- A Grain of Wheat. Curated by Leroi Coubagy, Commonwealth Institute, London (1991). In sostegno ai programmi dell'UNICEF.
- Il Sud del Mondo: L'altra arte contemporanea, Mazzotta, Milano, 1991. Curated by Pierre Gaudibert and Wijdan Ali (in collaboration with Umberto Melotti), Galleria civica d'arte contemporanea "Francesco Pizzo", Marsala (14 February–14 April 1991).
- Contemporary Bushmen art of Southern Africa, Kuru Cultural Project, Botswana, 1991. Curated by Kuru Cultural Project of D'Kar, Botswana in collaboration with Namibian Arts Association.
- Desplazamientos, Centro Atlantico de Arte Moderno, Las Palmas de Gran Canaria, Spain.
- Transmission, Rooseum, Malmö, Sweden.

1992

- The Jean Pigozzi Contemporary African Art Collection at the Saatchi Collection, The Saatchi Gallery, London, 1992.
- Home and the World: Architectural Sculpture by Two Contemporary African Artists, The Museum for African Art, Collana Focus on African Art, New York, 1992.
- La naissance de la peinture contemporaine en Afrique centrale, 1930–70, Musée Royal de l'Afrique Centrele, Tervuren, 1992. Musée Royal de l'Afrique Centrele, Tervuren, Bruxelles (1992).
- Paris Connections: African and Caribbean Artists in Paris, Asake Bomani and Belvie Rooks (eds), San Francisco: Q.E.D. Press, 1992, 56 pp.

1993

- Fusion: West African Artists at the Venice Biennale, Museum for African Art, New York, 1993. Curated by Thomas McEvilly and Susan Vogel, all'interno della Biennale di Venezia, 1993.
- La grande vérité, les astres africains, Musée des Beaux-Arts de Nantes, Nantes, 1993. Curated by Henry-Claude Cousseau, André Magnin, Jonas Storsve (25 June–25 September 1993).
- Creative Impulses/Modern Expressions-Four African Artists: Skunder Boghossian, Rashid Diab, Mohammed Omer Khalil, Amir Nour, African Studies and Research Center, Institute for African Development, Council for the Creative and Performing Arts, Cornell University, Ithaca, 1993. Curated by Salah Hassan.

1994

- Seen/Unseen. Curated by Olu Oguibe, Bluecoat Gallery, Liverpool (18 June–23 July 1994)
- F.R.A.C. Réunion, Lieux De Mémoire, Curated by Antonio Picariello, artisti: Jack Beng-Thi, Michael Elma, Alain Padeau, Eric Pongérard, Edouard Rajaona, Alì M'roivili dit Napalo, Malla Chummun Raymyead.
- Otro Païs: Escalas Africanas (Another Century: African Stepovers), Centro Atlantico de Arte Moderno, Les Palmas de Gran Canaria, 1994. Curated by Simon Njami e Joëlle Busca (coordinamento generale di Orlando Britto Jinorio), Las Palmas de Gran Canaria (15 November 1994 – 15 January 1995); Palma de Mallorca Fundacion "La Caixa" (15 February–16 April 1995).
- Rencontres Africaines: Exposition d'Art Actuel, Institute du Monde Arabe, Paris, 1994. Curated by Brahim Alaoui and Jean-Hubert Martin, Paris, Institut du Monde Arabe (6 April–15 August 1994).
- Around and Around. Curated by Peter Herrmann and Achim Kubinski, Galerie Peter Herrmann, Stuttgart (1994); Douala (1995); Berlin (1999); Stuttgart (1999).

1995

- Black Looks, White Masks, Ministerio de Asuntos Exterioires, Tabapress, Madrid, 1995. Curated by Octavio Zaya and Tumelo Mosaka.
- Seven Stories About Modern Art in Africa, Flammarion, New York, 1995. Curated by Clémentine Deliss and Salah Hassan, David Koloane, Catherine Lampert, Chika Okeke-Agulu, El Hadji Sy, Wanjiku Nyachae, Whitechapel Art Gallery, London (27 September–26 November 1995), as part of Africa95; Malmö, Sweden (27 January–17 March 1996).
- Vital: Three Contemporary African Artists (Cyprien Tokoudegba, Touhami Ennadre & Farid Belkahia). Tate Gallery Liverpool, Liverpool, 1995 (13 September–10 December 1995), all'interno di Africa95.
- Big City: Artists from Africa, Serpentine Gallery, London, 1995. Curated by Jean Pigozzi and Julia Peyton-Jones (20 September–5 December 1995), all'intero di Africa95.
- An Inside Story: African Art of Our Time, edited by Yukiya Kawaguchi, The Yomiuri Shimbun, Japan Association of Art Museums, Tokyo, 1995. Curated by Yukiya Kawaguchi, Setagaya Art Museum, Tokyo (23 September–19 November 1995); Tokushima Modern Art Museum (20 January–17 March 1996); Himeji City Museum of Art (6 April–6 May 1996); Koriyama City Museum of Art (18 May–23 June 1996); Genichiro Museum of Contemporary Art, Marugame Inokuma (7 July–1 September 1996); Museum of Fine Arts, Gifu (13 September–27 October 1996).
- Sign Traces Calligraphy: Five contemporary artists from North Africa. Curated by Rose Issa, London-Barbican Centre/Amsterdam-Treoenmuseum Kit, 1995.
- Persons and Pictures: the Modernist Eye in Africa, Newtown Galleries, Newtown, Johannesburg, 1995. Newtown Galleries, Newtown, Johannesburg (27 September–10 November 1995).
- New Visions: Recent Works by Six African Artists, edited by Salah Hassan and Okwui Enwezor, Zora Neale Hurston National Museum of Fine Arts, Eatonville, 1995. Curated by Salah Hassan and Okwui Enwezor.

1996

- Archetyp'Art Italia-Africa, Premio Termoli 1996, curated by Antonio Picariello (presentazione di Omar Calabrese), Electa Na, 1996. Artisti: Mimmo Paladino, Massimo Pulini, Gilberto Zorio, Santolo De Luca, Roberto Nottoli, Roberto Lucca Taroni, Ngwenya Valente Malangatana, Mickael Elma, Alain Padeau, Thierry Fontaine, Alim'Roivili dit Napalo, Sandile Zulu.
- Colours: Kunst aus Südafrika, Haus der Kulturen der Welt, Berlin, 1996.
- In/Sight: African Photographers: 1940 to the Present, Solomon Guggenheim, 1996. Curated by Okwui Enwezor, Octavio Zaya, Clare Bell and Danielle Tilkin, Guggenheim Museum (24 May–29 September 1996).
- Neue Kunst aus Afrika, Edition Braus, Heidelberg, 1996. Curated by Alfons Hug, Haus der Kulturen der Welt, Berlin, 1996.
- Die Andere Reise: Afrika und die Diaspora (The Other Journey: Africa and Diaspora), Holzhausen, Vienne, 1996.
- Gendered Visions: The Art of Contemporary Africana Women Artists, edited by Salah Hassan, Africa World Press, 1997. Curated by Salah Hassan (1996).
- Africana, Sala 1, Roma and Adriano Parise Editore, Verona, 1996. A cura Francesca Capriccioli, Sala 1, Roma (1 February 1996). Artisti partecipanti: El Anatsui, Theo Eshetu, Fathi Hassan, Ali Kichou, Bertina Lopes, Kivuthi Mbuno, Kwesi O. Owusu-Ankomah, Hadjira Preure, Twins Seven Seven, Panga Wa Panga, George Zogo. Testi in catalogo: Mary Angela Schroth, Gianni Baiocchi, Olu Oguibe.

1997

- Veilleurs de Monde: Gbedji Kpontolè – Une aventure béninoise, Editions CQFD, Paris, 1998. Exhibition and residency project, Centre Culturel Français du Benin (12 August–9 September 1997).
- Die Anderen Modernen: Zeitgenössische Kunst aus Afrika, Asien und Lateinamerika, Editions Braus & Hauses der Kulturen des Welt, Berlin, 1997. Curated by Alfons Hug, Hauses der Kulturen des Welt, Berlin (8 May–27 July 1997).
- Cross/ing: Time | Space | Movement. Curated by Olu Oguibe, University of South Florida, Tampa (4 September–18 October 1997); Track 16 Gallery, Santa Monica (28 February–24 April 1998); Indianapolis (7 August 1999).
- Modernities & Memories. Curated by Brahim Alaoui, Pia Alisjahbana, Suhail Bisharat, Clifford Chanin, Salima Hashmi, Salah Hassan, Hasan-Uddin Khan, Beral Madra, Toeti Heraty Noerhadi, A. D. Pirous, Zenobio Institute, in contemporanea con la XLVII Biennale di Venezia, 1997.
- Suites Africaines. Curated by Revue Noire, Couvent des Cordeliers, Paris (5 March–16 April 1997).
- Lumière noire: Art contemporain, Château de Tanlay-Yonne, Yonne, Francia, 1997. Curated by Michel Nuridsany, Centre d'Art de Tanlay, Yonne (7 June–5 October 1997).
- Image and Form: Prints, Drawings and Sculpture from Southern Africa and Nigeria, (edited by) John Picton, School of Oriental and African Studies, University of London, London, 1997. Curated by Robert Loder, Lisa Muncke, John Picton.
- Transforming the Crown: African, Asian and Caribbean artistis in Britain, 1966–1996, edited by Franklin Sirmans and Mora J. Beauchamp-Byrd, the Caribbean Cultural Center/African Diaspora, New York, 1997.
- Inklusion: Exklusion. Kunst im Zeitalter von Postkolonialismus und globale Migration, Köln, Germany, 1997.

1998

- Africa Africa: Vibrant New Art from a Dynamic Continent. Curated by Rajae Benchemsi, Rob Burnet, Yacouba Konaté, Toshio Shimizu, Jean-Hubert Martin, Tobu Museum of Art, Tokyo (11 September–24 November 1998).
- Body & Soul. Curated by Anke van der Laan, Stadsgalerij Heerlen, Olanda (4 April–14 June 1998).
- Transatlantico. Curated by Octavio Zaya, Centro Atlantico de Arte Moderno, Les Palmas de Gran Canaria (15 April–14 June 1998).
- Transforming the Crown: African, Asian & Caribbean Artists in Britain 1966–1996. Curated by M. Franklin Sirmans and Mora J. Beauchamp-Byrd, New York, 1998.
- Snap me one! Studiofotografen in Afrika, Münchner Stadtmuseum, 1998. Curated by Tobias Wendl and Heike Behrend, Münchner Stadtmuseum (1998); Städtisches Museum Abteiberg, Mönchengladbach; Iwalewa Haus, Bayreuth, Germany; National Museum for African Art, Smithsonian Institution, Washington D.C., US (1999).

1999

- Africa by Africa: A Photographic View. Curated by the Barbican Art Gallery in collaboration with Revue Noire and Autograph, Barbican Centre, London (29 January–28 March 1999).
- Trafique. Curated by Piet Vanrobaeys, S.M.A.K. extra muros, Gent (4 April–16 May 1999).
- Contemporary African Art from the Jean Pigozzi Collection, Sotheby's, London, 1999. Asta presso Sotheby's (24 June 1999).
- South meets West, Berna, 2000. Curated by Bernhard Fibicher, Yacouba Konaté and Yuonre Vera, Accra (10 November–5 December 1999); Berna (6 April–25 June 2000).
- Transatlantic Dialogue: Contemporary Art In and Out of Africa. Curated by Michael D. Harris, Ackland Art Museum (12 December 1999 – 26 March 2000); Washington D.C., Smithsonian Institution (21 May–3 September 2000); Chicago, DuSable Museum of African American History (7 October–31 December 2000).
- Tagewerke: Bilder zur Arbeit in Afrika (All in a day's work: images of work in Africa), Museum für Völkerkunde, Frankfurt am Main, 1999. Curated by Joanna Agathe, Museum für Völkerkunde, Galerie 37, Frankfurt am Main.
- Amabhuku|Amabhuku: Illustrations d'Afrique/Illustrations from Africa, La Joie par les Livres AJPL, Clamart, Francia, 1999. Curated by Marie Laurentin, Viviana Quiñones and Cécile Lebon, Fiera Internazionale del Libro per l'Infanzia, Bologna (8–11 April 1999).

2000

- TransAfricana: Artisti contemporanei, Edizione Lai Momo, Bologna, 2000. Curated by Mary Angela Schroth, Bologna (15 January–24 February 2000).
- Il ritorno dei Maghi: Il Sacro nell'arte africana contemporanea, Edizioni Skira, Milano, 2000. Curated by Sarenco ed Enrico Mascelloni (Orvieto, 8 April–30 June 2000).
- Partage d'Exotisme: Biennale d'Art Contemporain de Lyon, Lione, 2000. Curated by Jean-Hubert Martin.
- Insertion: Self and Other. Curated by Salah Hassan. Apexart, New York (18 April–20 May 2000).
- Continental Shift: A Voyage Between Cultures. An Exhibition of Contemporary Art, Modo Verlag Freiburg, 2000. Contemporaneamente in quattro spazi espositivi: Ludwig Forum for International Art, Aachen; the Bonnefanten Museum, Maastricht (exhibition on Africa curated by Marjorie A. Jongbloed); the National Gallery, Heerlen; the Museum of Modern and Contemporary Art, Liége (21 May–21 September 2000).
- La Cour Africaine: Mobiliers et objets contemporains. Curated by Ibrahim Loutou, L'Afrique en créations, Salle des Malades, Lille (23 October–30 November 2000).
- Dreierkonferenz: Aboudramane, Owusu-Ankomah, Lawson Oyekan. Curated by Peter Herrmann, Galerie Peter Herrmann, Stuttgart (4 November–24 December 2000).
- Mostra Africana de Arte Contemporânea. Curated by Solange Oliveira Farkas, Fundação Cultural Palmares and Associação Cultural Videobrasil, São Paulo, Brasile (16 August–17 September 2000).
- El Tiempo de Africa. Curated by Simon Njami, Centro Atlantico de Arte Moderno (12 December 2000 – 4 February 2001); Madrid, 19 April–31 May 2001.
- EXITCONGOMUSEUM, Royal Museum for Central Africa, Tervuren, 2000. Curated by Toma Muteba Luntumbue, Royal Museum for Central Africa, Tervuren, Belgio.
- Blick-Wechsel: Afrikanische Videokunst, Ifa Gallery, Bonn. Curated by Marcel Odenbach, Ifa Galleries Bonn, Stuttgart, Berlin (2000–01).

2001

- Authentic/Ex-Centric, Forum For African Arts, Ithaca (NY), 2001. Curated by Salah Hassan and Olu Oguibe, exhibition "a latere" 49ª Biennale di Venezia (9 June–30 September 2001).
- Africas: The Artist and the City – A Journey and an Exhibition, Centre de Cultura Contemporania de Barcelona, Barcelona, 2001. Curated by Pep Subiros (29 May–11 September 2001).
- African Styles: Kleidung und Textilien aus Afrika, Iwalewa-Haus, Bayreuth, Germany. Curated by Kerstin Bauer (21 October 2001 – 31 March 2002).
- Unpacking Europe: Towards a Critical Reading, edited by Salah Hassan and Iftikhar Dadi, Museum Boijmans Van Beuningen & NAI Publishers, Rotterdam, 2001. Curated by Salah Hassan and Iftikhar Dadi in collaboration with Chris Dercon and Patricia Pulles, Museum Boijmans Van Beuningen, Rotterdam (13 December 2001 – 24 February 2002).
- Art populaire. Curated by Hervé Chandès in collaboration with Hélène Kelmachter and André Magnin, Fondation Cartier pour l'art, Paris, (21 June–4 November 2001).
- The Short Century: Independence and Liberation Movements in Africa 1945–1994, edited by Okwui Enwezor, Prestel, Munich-New York, 2001. Curated by Okwui Enwezor, Villa Stuck, Munich (15 February–22 April 2001); Haus der Kulturen der Welt, Berlin (18 May–22 July 2001); Museum of Contemporary Art, Chicago (8 September–30 December 2001); P.S.1 Contemporary Art Center and The Museum of Modern Art, New York (10 February–5 May 2002).

2002

- Afrikanische Reklamekunst, Iwalewa-Haus, Bayreuth, Germany. Curated by Otto Frick (24 October 2002 – 16 February 2003).
- Die Welt ist ein Maskentanz: Afrikanische Künstler in der Sammlung Greiffenberger, Iwalewa-Haus, Bayreuth, Germany. Curated by Sigrid Horsch-Albert (9 May–31 August 2002).
- africa apart _ Afrikanische Künstlerinnen und Künstlern konfrontieren Aids. Curated by Arbeitsgruppe Unterbrochen Karrieren, Thomas Michalak, Torsten, Neuendorff, Beate M. Sauer-Dolezal, Sabine Schlenker, Ingo Taubhorn, Neue Gesellschaft für bildende Kunst, Berlin, Germany (14 December 2002 – 9 February 2003).
- Flash Afrique: Photography from West Africa, Steidl, 2002. Curated by Thomas Miessgang, Gerald Matt, Barbara Schröder, Kunsthalle Wien, Vienna, 2002.

2003

- A Fiction of Authenticity: Contemporary Africa Abroad, Contemporary Art Museum, St. Louis – USA, 2003. Curated by Shannon Fitzgerald, Carnegie Mellon University, Pittsburgh USA (20 September 2003 – 3 January 2004).
- Looking Both Ways: Art of the Contemporary African Diaspora, Museum for African Art, New York. Curated by Laurie Ann Farrell, Museum for African Art, New York (14 November 2003 – 1 March 2004); Peabody Essex Museum, Salem, MA (27 March–18 July 2004); Cranbrook Art Museum, Bloomfield Hills, MI (12 September–28 November 2004); Museu Calouste Gulbenkian, Lisboa (1 March 2005); Museum of African Diaspora, San Francisco (March 2006).
- Transferts. Curated by Toma Muteba Luntumbue, Palais des Beaux-Arts, Bruxelles (21 June–14 September 2003), all'interno di Africalia 03.
- Fault Lines: Contemporary African Art Shifting Landscapes, inIVA, London, 2003. Curated by Gilane Tawadros and Sarah Campbell, all'interno della 50ª Biennale di Venezia (15 June–2 November 2003).
- Iwalewa Reload, Iwalewa-Haus, Bayreuth, Germany (15 October 2003 – 22 February 2004).
- Roots & Routes: Afrikaner in Oberfranken, Iwalewa-Haus, Bayreuth, Germany (14 November 2003 – 22 February 2004).
- Correspondances Afriques, Iwalewa-Haus, Bayreuth, Germany. Curated by Artur Elmer (24 April 2003 – 24 August 2003).
- Fuoriluogo 8 / Afritalia. Curated by Mary Angela Schroth, Chiesa San Bartolomeo and Galleria Limiti inchiusi, Campobasso (29 August–20 September 2003)
- NEXT FLAG.Reexistencia cultural generalizada: Exposition d'art contemporain africain – Collection Hans Bogatzke (il titolo della pubblicazione è Next Flag: The African Sniper Reader, edited by Fernando Alvim, Heike Munder and Ulf Wuggenig, Migros Museum für Gegenwartskunst, Zürich, 2005). Curated by Fernando Alvim and Simon Njami, Site de l'Université du Travail Paul Pastur, Charleroi, Belgio (14 March–18 May 2003).

2004

- Africa Remix. Curated by Simon Njami in collaboration with Els van der Plas, David Elliott, Jean-Hubert Martin, Marie-Laure Bernadac, Roger Malbert, Museum Kunst Palast, Düsseldorf (24 July–7 November 2004); Hayward Gallery, London (10 February–17 April 2005); Centre Georges Pompidou, Paris (25 May–15 August 2005); Mori Art Museum, Tokyo (2 May 2006).
- Africa Screams: The Evil in Cinema, Art and popular Culture. Curated by Thomas Miegang and Tobias Wendl, Kunsthalle Wien, Austria (4 November 2004 – 30 January 2005); Iwalewa-Haus, Bayreuth, Germany (29 April–12 September 2004); Kunstverein Aalen (3 April–12 July 2005); Museum der Weltkulturen in Frankfurt (8 July 2005 – 15 January 2006).
- Black Box: Les Afriques. Curated by Laurent Jacob, Espace 251 Nord asbl, 2004; Tri Postal, Lille, Francia (31 March–8 August 2004) durante Lille 2004.
- Les Afriques: 36 artistes contemporains, Editions Autrement, Paris, 2004. Curated by Olivier Sultan, Musée des Arts derniers/Jean-Marc Patras Galerie/Espace CPP, Paris. In occasione della Foire internationale des Arts derniers.
- L'Afrique à venir. Curated by Peter Herrmann, Galerie Peter Herrmann, Stuttgart (24 April–20 June 2004).
- Africani in Africa. Palazzo Pazzi-Ammanti, Firenze (29 December 2004 – 6 March 2005).
- Escape and Memory, Curated by Enrico Mascelloni and Virginia Ryan, Camera dei deputati, Roma, June 2004.
- New Identities. Zeitgenössische Kunst aus Südafrika. Kunstmuseum Bochum, Germany (31 July–7 November 2004).
- Insights: Selections from the contemporary collection. Curated by Kinsey Katchka and Allyson Purpurra, National Museum of African Art, Smithsonian Institution, Washington DC (febbraio-novembre 2004).
- Der Black Atlantic. Haus der Kulturen der Welt, Berlin, Germany (17 September–15 November 2004).
- L'arte africana dall'Algeria al Sudafrica. Curated by "Oltre l'Africa"-Centro Studi e Documentazione Africana, in collaboration with la SUI-Sviluppi Umani Immaginati, Toscana (15 September 2004–)

2005

- Zeitgenössische Kunst aus Afrika und Europa im Dialog. Curated by Dany Keller, Iwalewa-Haus, Bayreuth, Germany (28 April–4 September 2005).
- Plakate in Afrika. Iwalewa-Haus, Bayreuth, Germany (20 October 2005 – 26 February 2006).
- Gleichzeitig in Afrika... [Meanwhile in Africa...]. Curated by Christian Hanussek, Akademie der Bildenden Künste, Nürnberg (3–17 June 2005); Universität der Künste, Berlin (18–28 January 2006).
- Mostra Pan-Africana de Arte Contemporânea. Museu de Arte Moderna da Bahia, Brasile (18 March–17 April 2005).
- Africa Urbis: Perspectives urbaines, edited by Olivier Sultan, Musée des arts derniers, Paris, 2005. Curated by Olivier Sultan, Musée des arts derniers, Paris.
- TEXTures: word and symbol in contemporary African art. Curated by Elizabeth Harney, Smithsonian Museum of African Art, Washington D.C. (2 September 2005).
- African American vernacular photography. Curated by Brian Wallis, International Center of Photography, New York (9 December 2005 – 26 February 2006).
- Arts of Africa: Jean Pigozzi's Contemporary Collection, Skira, Milano, 2005. Curated by André Magnin, Grimaldi Forum, Monaco.
- Mostra Pan-Africana de Arte Contemporanea, Associação Cultural Videobrasil, 2006. Curated by FundaCAo Cultural Palmares, Museu de Arte Moderna Da Bahia, Mam E Sala Walter Da Silveira, Salvador-Ba (18 March–17 April 2005).

2006

- Olvida quién soy/Erase me from who I am, Centro Atlántico de Arte Moderno, Las Palmas de Gran Canaria, Spagna, 2006. Curated by Elvira Dyangani Ose in collaboration with Tracy Murinik, Gabi Ngcobo and Khwezi Gule, CAAM, Isole Canarie (23 February–30 April 2006).
- Africa Nera: Protagonisti dell'arte africana. Curated by Enrico Mascelloni, Franco Riccardo and Sarenco, Castel dell'Ovo, Napoli (18 May–13 June 2006).
- Snap Judgments: New Positions in Contemporary African Photography, International Center of Photography, New York, 2006. Curated by Okwui Enwezor, International Center of Photography, New York (10 March–28 May 2006), Miami Art Central, Miami, Florida (30 June–27 August 2006).
- 100% Africa. Curated by André Magnin, The Guggenheim Museum Bilbao, Spagna (October 2006– February 2007).
- Des Hommes sans Histoire: Histoire et spoliation des biens culturels à travers les œuvres d'artistes contemporains. Curated by Olivier Sultan, Musée des Arts Derniers, Paris (29 June–31 July 2006).
- Distant Relatives/Relative Distance. Curated by Michael Stevenson, Cape Town, Sudafrica (8 June–12 August 2006).
- There & Back: Africa, La Casa Encendida, Obra Social Caja Madrid, 2006. Curated by Danielle Tilkin.

2007

- Africa Today – The dark side of the art. Curated by Luca Faccenda and Marco Parri, La Vetrina di Roma, Rome, Italy, 2007.
- Check List Luanda Pop. Curated by Fernando Alvim and Simon Njami. 52nd Venice Biennale, Venice, Italy (June–July 2007).
- Why Africa? La Collezione Pigozzi, Fondazione Pinacoteca del Lingotto Giovanni and Marella Agnelli, Mondadori Electa, Milano, 2007. Curated by André Magnin, Pinacoteca del Lingotto, Torino, 6 October 2007 – 3 February 2008.
- AfriqueEurope: Reves croises in Ateliers des Tanneurs, Brussels, Belgium. Group exhibition curated by Yacouba Konaté. Artists included: El Anatsui, Nu Barreto, El Berry Bickle and Luis Basto, Frédéric Bruly Bouabré, Dilomprizulike, Mustapha Dime, EL Loko, Tapfuma Gutsa, Annie Haloba, Jak Katarikawe, Jems Robert Koko Bi, Abdoulaye Konaté, Bill Kouelany, Siriki Ky, Ndary Lo, Toyin Loye, Churchill Madikida, Joel Mpah Dooh, Francis Mampuya, Ingrid Mwangi, Robert Hutter, Serigne Niang, Babacar Niang, Samuel Olou, Freddy Tsimba, and Guy Bertrand Wouété.

2009

- Tanzania VS Congo, George Lilanga, Maurus Mikael Malikita, M. Charinda, M.Sagula, (Tanzania) Cheri Cherin, Cheick Ledy, Jean Paul Mika (Congo), Kyo Art Gallery, Viterbo, 2 September 2009 – 26 September 2009. Curated by Massimiliano Del Ninno.

2010

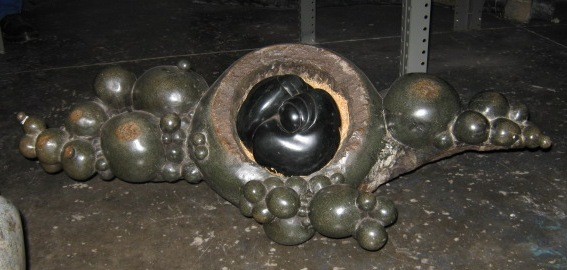
Genesis by Tapfuma Gutsa (2010)

- L'Africa nei loro occhi: Cheri Cherin, Pierre Bodo, Amani Bodo, Jean Paul Mika Nsimba (Repubblica democratica del Congo); George Lilanga (Tanzania); Almighty God (Ghana); Bruce Onobrakpeya, Prince Twins Seven Seven, (Nigeria); Kivuthi Mbuno (Kenia); Ester Mahlangu, Churchill Songezile Madikida (Sud Africa). Curated by Antonella Pisilli, Ex Convento dei Carmelitani Scalzi per la settima edizione di Vitarte, Viterbo, (12–15 March 2010)
- Africa, Assume Art Position! Primo Marella Gallery, Milano, 2010. By Primo Giovanni Marella, curated by Yacouba Konaté with Mounir Fatmi, Cameron Platter, Soly Cissé, Barthélémy Toguo, Abdoulaye Konaté, Joel Andrianomearisoa, Peter Eastman, Nandipha Mntambo, Moridja Kitenge Banza, Stuart Bird, Athi Patra Ruga, Vitshios Mwilambwe Bondo, Primo Marella Gallery, Milano (12 November 2010 – 30 January 2011).
- Who Knows Tomorrow: El Anatsui, Zarina Bhimji, Antonio Ole, Yinka Shonibare, Pascale Marthine Tayou. Nationalgalerie, Berlin. Curated by Chika Okeke-Agulu, Britta Schmitz, Udo Kittelmann (2 June–23 September).
- Events of the Self: Portraiture and Social Identity: Contemporary African Art from the Walther Collection, Neu-Ulm, Germany. Curated by Okwui Enwezor (June 2010–May 2011).
- Colui che non-dimentica, Frédéric Bruly Bouabré, Kyo Art Gallery, Viterbo, 9 October 2010 – 15 November 2010. Curated by Antonella Pisilli.

2011

- Africa, Assume Art Position! Primo Marella Gallery, Milano, 2010. Un progetto di Primo Giovanni Marella, a cura di Yacouba Konaté con Mounir Fatmi, Cameron Platter, Soly Cissé, Barthélémy Toguo, Abdoulaye Konaté, Joel Andrianomearisoa, Perter Eastman, Nandipha Mntambo, Moridja Kitenge Banza, Stuart Bird, Athi Patra Ruga, Vitshios Mwilambwe Bondo, Primo Marella Gallery, Milano (12 November 2010 – 30 January 2011).
- Il Divin saggio, Almighty God, Kyo Art Gallery, Viterbo, 29 April 2011 – 7 May 2011. Curated by Antonella Pisilli.
- Transafricana, Esther Mahlangu (South Africa), George Lilanga (Tanzania), Seni Camara (Senegal), Mikidadi Bush (Tanzania), Kivuthi Mbuno (Kenya), Peter Wanjau (Kenya), Fondazione 107, Torino, 17 June–16 October 2011. Curated by Achille Bonito Oliva.

2012

- Bestiario, Soly Cissé, Kyo Art Gallery, Viterbo, 14 April–14 May 2012. Curated by Antonella Pisilli.
- Making Way: Contemporary Art from South Africa and China. Curated by Ruth Simbao. Albany Museum, Fort Selwyn and the Provost, National Arts Festival, Grahamstown, South Africa (2012)

2013

- Lena, Gavin Rain, Kyo Art Gallery, Viterbo, 28 June–7 July 2013. Curated by Antonella Pisilli.
- Making Way: Contemporary Art from South Africa and China. Curated by Ruth Simbao. Standard Bank Gallery, Johannesburg, South Africa (2013)

2014

- STILL FIGHTING IGNORANCE & INTELLECTUAL PERFIDY, Ben Uri Museum, London, 1–30 March 2014. Curated by Kisito Assangni

Including: Said Afifi (Morocco) | Nirveda Alleck ( Mauritius) | Jude Anogwih (Nigeria) | Younes Baba-Ali (Morocco) | Rehema Chachage (Tanzania) | Saidou Dicko (Burkina Faso) | Ndoye Douts (Senegal) | Kokou Ekouagou (Togo) | Mohamed El Baz (Morocco) | Samba Fall (Senegal) | Dimitri Fagbohoun (Benin) | Wanja Kimani (Kenya) | Nicene Kossentini (Tunisia) | Kai Lossgott (South Africa) | Michele Magema (D.R.Congo) | Nathalie Mba Bikoro (Gabon) | Victor Mutelekesha (Zambia) | Johan Thom (South Africa) | Saliou Traoré (Burkina Faso) | Guy Woueté (Cameroon) | Ezra Wube (Ethiopia).

- SLIP: Igshaan Adams and Mbali Khoza. Curated by Ruth Simbao. Albany Museum, Grahamstown, South Africa (September 2014)
- Ici l'Afrique / Here Africa – L'Afrique contemporaine à travers le regard de ses artistes Georges Adéagbo (Bénin), Omar Ba (Sénégal), Faouzi Bensaïdi* (Maroc), Filipe Branquinho (Mozambique), Frédéric Bruly Bouabré (Côte d'Ivoire), Edson Chagas (Angola), Romuald Hazoumé (Bénin), Pieter Hugo (South Africa), Adelita Husni-Bey (Libye), Nadia Kaabi-Linke (Tunisia), Gonçalo Mabunda (Mozambique), Mustafa Maluka (South Africa), Abu Bakarr Mansaray (Sierra Leone), J. D. 'Okhai Ojeikere (Nigeria), Joshua Okoromodeke (Nigeria), Richard Onyango (Kenya), Idrissa Ouédraogo* (Burkina Faso), Chéri Samba (Congo), Sarkis & Guem & Perdrix* (France/Bénin), Zineb Sedira (Algérie), Malick Sidibé (Mali), Abderrahmane Sissako* (Mauritanie), Yinka Shonibare MBE (UK/Nigéria), Pascale Marthine Tayou (Cameroon), Barthélémy Toguo (Cameroon), 8 May–6 July 2014, Château de Penthes Ch. de l'Impératrice, Genève-Pregny, Commissaire générale Adelina von Fürstenberg.
- Happiness, Lovemore Kambudzi, Kyo Art Gallery, Viterbo, 28 June–1 July 2014. Curated by Antonella Pisilli
- Nouchi City, Aboudia, Galerie Cécile Fakhoury, Abidjan, 26 September 2014 – 15 November 2014
- The Divine Comedy: Heaven, Purgatory and Hell Revisited by Contemporary African Artists

2018

- AfroPunk - Kendell Geers, Didier Claes Gallery, Brussels

2019

- IncarNations - African Art as Philosophy. Curated by Kendell Geers and Sindika Dokolo, BOZAR, Brussels
- The Facade Commission: Wangechi Mutu, The NewOnes, will free Us - The Metropolitan Museum of Art, New York, 9 September 2019 – 1 November 2020

2020

- OrnAmenTum'EtKriMen, Kendell Geers curated by Danillo Eccher, M77 Gallery Milano
- Zanele Muholi - Tate Modern, London, 5 November 2020 – 7 March 2021

2021

- Ibrahim Mahama, Lazarus - White Cube Bermondsey, London, 15 September – 7 November 2021
- Zanele Muholi - Gropius Bau, Berlin, 26 November 2021 – 13 March 2022

2022

- 14th Dakar Biennale (Dak'Art), Ĩ NDAFFA # – Forger – Out of the Fire - Dakar, Senegal, 19 May - 21 June 2022
- William Kentridge - Royal Academy of Arts, London, 24 September – 11 December 2022

2023

- Wangechi Mutu, Intertwined - New Museum, New York, 2 March – 4 June 2023
- A World in Common: Contemporary African Photography - Tate Modern, London, 6 July 2023 – 14 January 2024

2024

- Otobong Nkanga, Cadence - The Metropolitan Museum of Art, New York, 10 October 2024 – 8 June 2025

2025

- Wangechi Mutu, Black Soil Poems - Galleria Borghese, Rome, 10 June – 14 September 2025
- Nigerian Modernism - Tate Modern, London, 8 October 2025 – 10 May 2026

== Collections of essays ==
- Colloquium: Function and Significance of African Negro Art in the Life of the People and for the People, Paris: Presence Africaine, 1968. Conferenza a cura della Society of African Culture (SAC) in collaboration with UNESCO, 30 March–8 April 1966.
- Ethnic and Tourists Arts: Cultural Expressions from the Fourth World, edited by Nelson H. H. Graburn, University of California Press, Berkeley, 1976.
- Modern Konst I Afrika (Modern Art in Africa), edited by Sune Nordgren, Kalejdoskop, Lund (Svezia), 1978.
- Patrimoine Culturel et Création Contemporaine: en Afrique et dans le Monde Arabe, edited by Mohamed Aziza, Dakar: Les Nouvelles Editions Africaines, 1977.
- Airport Art: das exotische Souvenir, Institut für Auslandsbeziehungen, Stuttgart, 1987.
- Kunstreise nach Afrika: Tradition und Moderne, edited by Ronald Ruprecht, Iwalewa-Haus, Universität, Bayreuth, 1988.
- African Art in Southern Africa: From Tradition to Township, edited by A. Nettleton and D. Hammond-Tooke, Johannesburg: A.D. Donker, 1989.
- The Myth of Primitivism: Perspectives on Art, edited by Susan Hiller, London/New York: Routledge, 1991.
- Art, Anthropology and the Modes of Re-Presentation: Museums and Contemporary non-Western Art, edited by Harrie Leyten and B. Damen, KIT Press-Koninklijk Instituut voor de Tropen, Amsterdam, 1993.
- Banque centrale des etats de l'Afrique de l'ouest. BCEAO: Collection d'art contemporain, edited by Ousmane Sow Huchard, BCEAO, Dakar, 1993.
- Creer en Afrique: 2e colloque européen sur les arts d'Afrique noire, Musée National des Arts d'Afrique and d'Océanie, Paris, 23–24 October 1993.
- Global Visions Towards a New Internationalism in the Visual Arts, edited by Jean Fisher, London: Kala Press, 1994.
- Cultural Diversity in the Arts: art, art policies and the facelift of Europe, edited by Ria Lavrijsen, Royal Tropical Institute, Amsterdam, 1993.
- Art Criticism and Africa, edited by Katy Deepwell, Saffron Books, African Art and Society Series, London, 1997.
- Images of Enchantment: Visual and performing Arts of the Middle East, edited by Sherifa Zuhur, The American University in Cairo Press, Cairo, 1998.
- Issues in Contemporary African Art, edited by Nkiru Nzegwu, International Society for the Study of Africa, ISSA Binghamton University, Binghamton, NY, 1998.
- Dialogue of the Present: 18 Contemporary Arab Women Artists, edited by Siumee H. Keelan, Fran Lloyd, London, 1999.
- Reading the Contemporary. African Art from Theory to the Marketplace, edited by Olu Oguibe and Okwui Enwenzor, Institute of International Visual Arts (inIVA) and MIT Press, London, 1999.
- autopsia & desarquivios, edited by Fernando Alvim and Catherine Goffeau Alvim, Espace Sussuta Boé, Bruxelles, 1999.
- Colors of Enchantment: Theater, Dance, and the Visual Arts of Middle East, edited by Sherifa Zuhur, The American University in Cairo Press, Cairo-New York, 2001.
- Anthologie de l'art africain du XX siècle, edited by N'Goné Fall and Jean Loup Pivin, Paris: Éditions Revue Noire, 2001. Raccolta di saggi e schede di artisti.
- Afriche, Diaspore, Ibridi – Il concettualismo come strategia dell'arte africana contemporanea, edited by Eriberto Eulisse, AIEP Edizioni, Bologna, 2003.
- African cultural dynamics: Africalia Encounters in Bamako (01–03/11/2002), curated by Joëlle Busca, Africalia, 2003.
- Repenser la coopération culturelle en Afrique: Rencontre Africalia d'Ostende (27–29/05/2003), Rencontre Africalia de Liège (26–27/06/2003), Rencontre Africalia de Bruxelles (19–20/09/2003), edited by Joëlle Busca, Africalia, 2004.
- Over Here: International Perspectives on Art and Culture, edited by Gerardo Mosquera and Jean Fisher (con il progetto artistico di Francis Alÿs), New Museum of Contemporary Art-New York/The MIT Press-Cambridge Massachusetts & London, 2004.
- Next Flag: The African Sniper Reader, edited by Fernando Alvim, Heike Munder and Ulf Wuggenig, Migros Museum für Gegenwartskunst, Zürich, 2005.
- Hand Grenades From My Heart, Kendell Geers writings, edited by Jérôme Sans, Blue Kingfisher Limited, Beijing, 2013, ISBN 9881506476

== Monographs ==
- Margaret Trowell. African Arts and Crafts: Their Development in the School, London: Longman, 1937.
- Robert Goldwater. Primitivism in Modern Painting, New York: Random House, 1938 (1966, Harvard Belknap Press, Cambridge, MA, 1986).
- Rolf Italiaander. Neue Kunst in Afrika: eine Einführung, Bibliograf. Institut, Mannheim, 1957.
- Evelyn S. Brown. Africa's contemporary art and artists: a review of creative activities in painting, sculpture, ceramics and crafts of over 300 artists working in the modern industrialized societies of some of the countries of sub Saharan Africa, Division of Social Research and Experimentation, Harmon Foundation, New York, 1966.
- Ulli Beier. Contemporary Art in Africa, London: Pall Mall Press, 1968.
- Frank Willet. African Art, London: Thames and Hudson, 1971.
- Marshall Ward Mount. African Art: The Years since 1920, Bloomington: Indiana University Press, 1973 (New York: Da Capo Press, 1989).
- Judith D. Miller. Art in East Africa: A Guide to Contemporary Art, F. Muller, London-Africa Book Service (EA).-Nairobi, 1975.
- Kiure Francis Msangi. The Place of Fine Art in the East African Universities, 18th Annual Meeting
- Bruce Onobrakpeya: Nigeria's Master Printmaker - Wendy Lawrence. Best of Africa - Toronto 1979. of the African Studies Association, San Francisco, 1975.
- Eugene Burt. An Annotated Bibliography of the Visual Arts of East Africa, Bloomington: Indiana University Press, 1980.
- Ulli Beier. Neue Kunst in Afrika: das Buch zur Austellung, Berlin: Reimer, 1980.
- Paulin Hountondji. African Philosophy: Myth or Reality, New York, 1982.
- Jan Vansina. Art History in Africa: An Introduction to Method, London & New York: Longman, 1984.
- Bruce Onobrakpeya: Symbols of Ancestral Groves (Monograph of Prints and Paintings 1978–1985), with introduction by Prof. Babatunde Lawal. 256 pp. 182 b/w, 3 drawings, 60 colour illustrations, essays, interviews, notes and comments, biographical and bibliographical notes. 1985.
- Bennetta Jules-Rosette. The Messages of Tourist Art: An African Semiotic System in Comparative Perspective, Plenum Press, New York, 1984.
- Kojo Fosu. 20th century art of Africa, Zaria: Gaskiya Corporation, 1986 (Accra: Artists Alliance, 1993).
- Sally Price. Primitive Art in Civilized Places, The University of Chicago, 1989. I primitivi traditi: L'arte dei "selvaggi" e la presunzione occidentale, Einaudi, Torino, 1992.
- Johanna Agthe. Wegzeichen: Kunst aus Ostafrika (Signs: Art from East Africa), 1974–98, Museum für Völkerkunde, Frankfurt-an-Main, 1990.
- Bruce Onobrakpeya: The Spirit in Ascent. Introduction by Dele Jegede, 279 pp. Ovuomaroro Gallery production 1992.
- Osa D. Egonwa. African Art: A Contemporary Source Book, Benin City: Osasu Publishers, 1991.
- Jutta Stroeter-Bender. Zeitgenoessische Kunst des "Dritten Welt", Koeln: DuMont Buchverlag GmbH & Co, 1991. L'art contemporain dans les pays du "Tiers-monde", Paris: L'Harmattan, 1995.
- Pierre Gaudibert. L'art africain contemporain, Paris: Editions Cercle d'Art, 1991.
- Betty LaDuke. Africa through the Eyes of Women Artists, Trenton, NJ: Africa World Press, 1991.
- Bruce Onobrakpeya: Sabbatical Experiments 1978–1983 (exhibition of prints and drawings), with an introduction by Prof. Babatunde Lawal. Ovuomaroro Gallery, Lagos, 1983.
- Nicole Guez. Art africain contemporain: Guide, Paris: Editions Dialogue Entre Cultures, 1992 (Association Afrique en Création, 1996).
- Jean Kennedy. New Currents, Ancient Rivers: Contemporary African Artists in a Generation of Change, Smithsonian Institution Press, London-Washington DC, 1992.
- Thomas McEvilley. Art and Otherness: Crisis in Cultural Identity, Documenttext, New York: McPherson and Co., 1992. L'identité culturelle en crise: Art et différence à l'époque postmoderne et postcoloniale, Nîmes, France: Editions Jacqueline Chambon, 1992.
- Paul Gilroy, The Black Atlantic: Modernity and Double Consciousness, London: Verso, 1993
- Robert Atkins. Artspoke, New York: Abbeville Press, 1993.
- Christopher B. Steiner. Africa in Transit, Cambridge (UK): Cambridge University Press, 1994.
- Edward Lucie-Smith. Race, Sex and Gender in Contemporary Art: The Rise of Minority Culture, London: Art Books International; New York: Harry N. Abrams, 1994.
- A Study Exploring Opportunities to Strengthen U.S.-Based Collaborations with Performing Artists of Africa, Asia and Latin America. Prepared with the Support of the Ford Foundation, New England Foundation for the Arts, 3 June 1994. Project director Ceclila Fitzgibbon; Project consultants Elizabeth Peterson and Robert Wisdom (Archivio Ford Foundation).
- Catalogue de la collection d'oeuvres d'artistes contemporains d'Afrique et d'Océanie acquises ou conservées par l'ADEIAO, introduction by Lucette Albaret and Paul Balta, ADEIAO, Paris, 1995.
- Colin Rhodes. Primitivism and Modernism, London: Thames and Hudson, 1995.
- André Magnin and Jacques Soulillou. Contemporary Art of Africa, New York-London: Thames and Hudson, 1996.
- Ulrike Bässler-Pietsch. Das Bild unserer Welt; Afrika: von Kairo bis Kapstadt, aktualisierte Ausg., 1996.
- Betty LaDuke. Africa: Women's Art, Women's Lives, Trenton, NJ: Africa World Press, 1997.
- E. Okechukwu Odita. Diversity in Contemporary African Art: Causes And Effects, Columbus Ohio: The Ohio State University, 1997.
- Wijdan Ali. Modern Islamic Art: Development and Continuity, Gainesville: University Press of Florida, 1997.
- Richard J. Powell. Black Art and Culture in the 20th Century, London: Thames and Hudson, 1997.
- Karl-Ferdinand Schaedler. Afrikanische Kunst: von der Frühzeit bis heute, München: Heyne, 1997.
- Christopher D. Roy. Kilengi. Afrikanische Kunst aus der Sammlung Bareiss, Hanover: Kestner-Ges., 1997.
- Gert. Chesi. Afrika – Asien. Kunst und Ritualobjekte – die Sammlungen im Haus der Völker, Innsbruck: Haymon-Verlag, 1997.
- Sidney Littlefield Kasfir. Contemporary African Art, London: Thames & Hudson, 1999.
- Nicolas Bissek. Les peintres de l'estuaire, Paris: Editions Karthala, 1999.
- Enrico Mascelloni e Sarenco. Dialogo notturno sull'arte contemporanea alla luce del piccolo carro, Verona: Adriano Parise Editore, 1999.
- Joëlle Busca. L'art contemporain africain: du colonialisme au postcolonialisme, Paris: L'Harmattan, 2000.
- Gen Doy. Black Visual Culture: modernity and postmodernity, London: I. B. Tauris, 2000.
- Joëlle Busca. Perspectives sur l'art contemporain africain, Paris: L'Harmattan, 2000. L'arte contemporanea africana, L'Harmattan Italia, 2002.
- Teresa Macrì. Postculture, Maltemi, Roma, 2002.
- Iba Ndiaye Diadji. L'impossible Art Africain, Dakar: Editions Dekkando, 2002.
- Thomas Fillitz. Zeitgenössische Kunst aus Afrika: 14 Künstler aus Côte d´Ivoire und Bénin, Wien: Böhlau Verlag, 2002.
- Onobrakpeya by Richard A. Singletary. 78 pp. 143 colour reproductions. The Ford Foundation, The Institute of International Education, 2002.
- Ivan Bargna. Arte Africana, Jaca Book, Milano, 2003.
- Olu Oguibe. The Culture Game, University of Minnesota Press, Minneapolis/London, 2003.
- Bärbel Küster. Matisse und Picasso als Kulturreisende: Primitivismus und Anthropologie um 1900, Akademie Verlag, Berlin, 2003.
- Michela Manservisi. African Style: Stilisti, mode e design nel continente nero, Cooper & Castelvecchi, Roma, 2003.
- Jean-Loup Amselle. L'art de la friche: Essai sur l'art africain contemporain, Paris: Editions Flammarion, 2005. In Italian: L'arte africana contemporanea, Bollati Boringhieri, Torino, 2007.
- Christophe Domino and André Magnin. L'art africain contemporain, Editions Scala, 2005.
- Hortense Volle. La promotion de l'art africain contemporain et les N.T.I.C, Paris: L'Harmattan, 2005.
- Sophie Perryer (ed.). Distant Relatives / Relative Distance, Cape Town: Michael Stevenson, 2006.
- Sidney Littlefield Kasfir and Gus Gordon. Contemporary African Art, Paw Prints, 2008.
- Regula Tschumi The Buried Treasures of the Ga: Coffin Art in Ghana. Bern: Benteli, 2008.
- Okwui Enwezor and Chika Okeke-Agulu. Contemporary African art since 1980, Bologna: Damiani Editore, 2009.
- André Magnin, Africa? Una nuova storia, Rome: Gangemi, 2009.
- André Magnin and Luca Beatrice, Africa arte contemporanea, Milan: Prearo, 2009.
- Okwui Enwezor, ed., and Chika Okeke-Agulu, Gabrielle Conrath-Scholl, Willis E. Hartshorn, Virginia Heckert, Kobena Mercer, Artur Walther, Deborah Willis. Events of the Self: Portraiture and Social Identity: Contemporary African Art from the Walther Collection, Göttingen: Steidl, 2010.
- Uche Okeke: Art In Development - A Nigerian Perspective. Editor Leclair Grier Lambert. 101 pp. 81 b/w illustrations. Asele Institute Nimo/African American Cultural Centre, Minneapolis, 1982.
- Offerings from the Gods. Text by Dele Jegede 68 pp. 48 b/w illustration. Society of Nigerian Artists, Lagos State Chapter, 1985.
- Africa On Her Schedule Is Written a Change. Barbara Haeger 105 pp. 13 b/w illustrations. African Universities Press, 1981.
- Bruce Onobrakpeya: Sahelian Masquerades. Monograph of prints and paintings Edited by Safy Quel 132 pp. 17 colour and 155 b/w and line pictures, Ovuomaroro Gallery production, 1982.
- Bruce Onobrakpeya: 25 Years of Creative Search. Introduction by C. O. Adepegba, 57 pp. 51 b/w pictures, Ovuomaroro Gallery production, 1984.
- The Zaria Art Society: A New Consciousness. Edited by Paul Chike Dike and Pat Oyelola, with essays by Cornelius O. Adepegba, Oloidi, Don Akatakpo and Jacob Jari. 298 pp. 302 b/w reproductions and 133 colour reproductions. A publication of the National Gallery of Art, 1998.
- Agbarha-Otor 98 and 99: A Catalogue of First and Second Harmattan Workshop Exhibition. 84 pp. 127 b/w and 33 colour reproductions. Curated by Mike Omoighe, Ovuomaroro Gallery Production, 1999.
- Amos Tutuola Show: A Folklore Inspired Art In Honour of the Novelist. Edited by Mudiare Onobrakpeya and curated by Mike Omoighe and Toyin Akinosho; 40 pp. 25 b/w and 32 colour reproductions. Ovuomaroro Gallery production, 1999.
- Bruce Onobrakpeya: Poems and Lithographs, print notes and comments No.9. Introduced by Bruce Onobrakpeya 49 pp. 48 b/w line reproductions; Ovuomaroro Gallery Publications, 1989.
- Glimpses of Our Stars - An Intimate Encounter with Nigerian Leading Artistes by Oji Onoko, 468 pp. 99 B/W reproductions. All Media International Ltd, 1999.
- Forty Years of Bruce Onobrakpeya in Contemporary Visual Art: The Portrait of a Visual Artist. Edited by Mudiare Onobrakpeya and Uche Abalogu with an introduction by Simon Ikpakronyi. A collection of 26 essays on Bruce Onobrakpeya. 70 pp. Ovuomaroro Gallery Production.
- Bruce Onobrakpeya: Portfolio of Art and Literature, Catalogue. Edited by Pat Oyelola. Poems and extracts from various literary works. 56 pp. 30 illustrations in colour and b/w Ovuomaroro Gallery Production, 2003
- Bruce Onobrakpeya: Jewels of Nomadic Images, 196 pp., with essays by Ekpo Udoma, Olu Amoda and Peju Layiwola, 439 b/w and colour illustrations, Ovuomaroro Studio Press, 2009.
- The Divine Comedy: Heaven, Purgatory and Hell Revisited by Contemporary African Artists (Mara Ambrožič, Zdenka Badovinac, Roberto Casati, Johannes Hoff, Achille Mbembe, Simon Njami, Pep Subirós).
- "AniMystikAKtivist - Between Traditional and the Contemporary in African Art" Jens Hoffmann and Z.S. Strother. Yale University Press and MercatorFonds, 2018,ISBN 9780300233230
- "Foundations of Contemporary African Art" by Matthew Stanford, 2009

== Magazines ==
- ADA: Architecture Design Art. Johannesburg, from 1989 to 1996. Founded by Jennifer Sorrell.
- ART AFRICA: A comprehensive editorial content of art from Africa and the diaspora. Quarterly digital and annual print publication founded by Suzette and Brendon Bell-Roberts, Cape Town, South Africa, from 2002 to current.
- Africa e Mediterraneo: Cultura e società. Director Sandra Federici, Cooperativa Lai-Momo, Sasso Marconi (Bologna), from 1992. Please refer in particular to Dossier: Arte africana contemporanea, edited by Giovanni Parodi di Passano, no. 2–3/99, December 1999; "Dossier: Sulla storia dell'arte africana contemporanea", edited by Iolanda Pensa, no. 55, August 2006.
- Africana bulletin. Varsavia, Polonia.
- African Arts. Center of African Studies, UCLA, Los Angeles, USA, 1967.
- Afriche e Orienti. Director Mario Zamponi, AIEP Editore, Bologna, dal 1999.
- Africultures
- Afrik'Art. Dakar, from 2005 and associated with the Dakar Biennale.
- Art nègre. Namur, Belgium. Special issue Vivante afrique, no. 246, 1–53, 9 October 1966.
- Arts d'Afrique Noire, then "Arts Premiers". Arnouville, France.
- Art South Africa: A comprehensive overview of art from South Africa. Quarterly print publication founded by Suzette and Brendon Bell-Roberts, Cape Town, South Africa, from 2002 to current.
- Artthrob. Rivista online founded by Sue Williamson.
- Atlantica Revista de Arte y Pensamiento. Publication of the Centro Atlántico de Arte Moderno (CAAM), Las Palmas de Gran Canaria, from 1990.
- Black Art. Claremont, USA, from 1976.
- Black Orpheus: Journal of African and Afro-American Literature, founded by Ulli Beier, Ibadan, Nigeria (1957–75).
- Chimurenga: Who no know go know. Founded by Ntone Edjabe, Kalakuta Trust, Cape Town, South Africa, from 2002.
- Coartnews.
- Convergences: Revue trimestrielle d'art et de culture. Director Souleymane Bachir Diagne, Dakar, Senegal, from 1996.
- Contemporary Art from the Islamic World then Nafas Art Magazine.
- Critical Interventions: Journal of African art history and visual culture. Founded by Sylvester Okwunodu Ogbechie.
- DiARTgonale: Bimestriel panafricain d'opinions, de formation et de réflexion sur l'art contemporain africain. Founded by Achillekà Komguem, Yaoundé, Cameroon, from 2007.
- Drum Magazine
- Gallery. Delta Gallery Publications, Harare, Zimbabwe, from 1994.
- Glendora, Lagos, Nigeria.
- Journal de la Société des Africanistes, Paris.
- Kunstforum International. Director Dieter Bechtloff. In particular Weltkunst-Globalkultur (no. 118, 1992), Afrika – Iwalewa (n. 122, 1993), Out of Africa (no. 174, 2005).
- Metronome. Founded by Clémentine Deliss, from 1996. From 2005 the magazine has been produced by Metronome Press.
- NKA: Journal of Contemporary African Art. Founded by Okwui Enwezor, USA, from 1994.
- New Culture: A Review of Contemporary African Arts. Founded by Demas Nwoko, New Culture Studios Ibadan, Nigeria, from 1978.
- Objets et Mondes. Musée de l'Homme, Paris.
- Position: Journal on Contemporary African Arts, Director Dapo Adeniyi, from 2001.
- Présence Africaine: Revue Culturelle du Monde Noir. Founded by Alioune Diop, Paris, from 1947.
- Revue Noire. Founded by Jean Loup Pivin, Simon Njami, Pascal Martin Saint Léon, Paris, from 1991 to 1999.
- Staffrider.
- Third Text: Third World Perspectives on Contemporary Art & Culture. Founded by Rasheed Araeen, Kala Press, London, from 1987. In particular Africa Special Issue, no. 23, Summer 1993.
- Transition Magazine: A Journal of the Arts, Culture & Society.

== Databases ==
- AAVAA – The African and Asian Visual Artists' Archive, renamed Diversity Art Forum, London, from 1989.
- Africa Book Centre – Books from and about Africa, London.
- Africaserver, Amsterdam.
- Africinfo, Dakar, Senegal.
- African Colours.
- African Loxo.
- Africa South Art Initiative – ASAI, Cape Town.
- Archive of African Artists, Washington, DC, USA. Warren M. Robbins Library, National Museum of African Art, Smithsonian Institution.
- Artafrica Project.
- Contemporary African Art Collection. The Jean Pigozzi collection.
- Contemporary African Music and Arts Archive
- Devearts: an international platform for contemporary art from developing countries
- Foundation of Contemporary Art-Ghana
- Global Africa Art Market Report : annual analysis on the modern & contemporary African & its diaspora's art market.
- Modern African Art: A Basic Reading List, Washington DC, USA. Curated by Janet L. Stanley, Warren M. Robbins Library, National Museum of African Art, Smithsonian Institution Libraries. Begun in 1995, this annotated reading list is continually updated.
- OCPA Observatory of Cultural Policies in Africa, Maputo, Mozambico.
- Power of Culture, Amsterdam.
- Universes in Universe, Berlin.
- Virtual Museum of Modern Nigerian Art, hosted at the Pan-Atlantic University's web site. Created by Jess Castellote.
- Virtual Museum of Contemporary African Art, Amsterdam. Founded by Fons Geerlings and Maarten Rens, from 2001.

== See also ==
- Anne Zanele Mutema
- El Anatsui
- Fathi Hassan
- Ben Enwonwu
- Aimé Mpane
- Richard Butler Bowdon
- African art
- Philosopher's Legacy (Heirloom) Monumental African art heirloom
- Contemporary art
