= CAAM =

Caam refers to the heddles of a loom.

CAAM may refer to:

== Organisations ==
- University of Puerto Rico at Mayagüez, originally the Colegio de Agricultura y Artes Mecánicas
- Centro Atlántico de Arte Moderno, in Gran Canaria, Spain, producer of the magazine Atlántica
- Civil Aviation Authority (Macau)
- Caam Tech Pvt Ltd (Pakistan)

=== United States ===
- California African American Museum
- Center for Asian American Media

=== China ===
- China Association of Automobile Manufacturers

=== Malaysia ===
- Civil Aviation Authority of Malaysia previously known as the Department of Civil Aviation Malaysia

== Other uses ==
- Communauté d'agglomération Arles-Crau-Camargue-Montagnett, one of the Communes of the Bouches-du-Rhône department

== See also ==
- Caribbean Accreditation Authority for Education in Medicine and other Health Professions (CAAM-HP)
- CAAMFest, a film festival
