= Richard Butler Bowdon =

South African-born contemporary visual artist

- Born: 1957 (age 68–69); Cape Town, South Africa
- Known for: Painting, collage and installation

Richard Butler-Bowdon (born 1957) is a Cape Town-born artist who lives in Melbourne, Australia. His paintings and collages based on portraiture, African identities, migration and people living in the African diaspora. He has uses painting, photography, collage, masks and ritual objects to explore contemporary life in Africa and Western views of Africa.

== Early life and education ==
Bowdon was born in 1957 in Cape Town, South Africa. He has lived in Sudan, Thailand and the Netherlands and ives and works in Melbourne, Australia.

In 1980 to 1984, Bowdon completed a Bachelor of Art in painting at Prahran College of Art. And 1990 to 1993, he completed a Bachelor of Art in Asian Languages at Melbourne University, Victoria. From the year 1993 to 1994, he completed a Graduate Diploma in Asian Studies, including Arabic, Hindi and Islamic Studies. And in 1995 to 1996, he completed a Graduate Diploma in Secondary Education at Victoria University of Technology in Footscray, Victoria with methods in LOTE Arabic and English as a Second Language.

== Career ==
Bowdon's early work was influenced by the Fayyum portraits, Vladimir Tretchikoff, Francis Bacon and Amedeo Modigliani.

In 1993, he started exhibiting as a painter artist in solo and group exhibitions, including at Nexus Multicultural Gallery Lion Arts Centre in Adelaide, Spencer Street Gallery in West Melbourne, and BUS Gallery in Melbourne. In 2013, he exhibited at the 1:54 Art Fair in London which follow his second exhibition In 2014 1:54 Art Fair in London and the Jo'burg Art Fair in Johannesburg. In 2015, he exhibited at the Cape Town Art Fair, Joburg Art Fair and Summa Contemporary Art Fair in Madrid.

In 2021, he exhibited at Nomad Gallery with Allegory & Intent in Brussels and (Looking In) at Ebony Curated in Cape Town. In 2022, Bowdon exhibited at Nomad Gallery and The Solo Project in Brussels. In 2023, he was among the artists included in Africa Supernova, an exhibition of the contemporary African painting collection of Carla and Pieter Schulting at Kunsthal KAdE which ran from 24 September 2023 to 7 January 2024.

In 2024, he was a finalist in the Darling Portrait Prize at the National Portrait Gallery in Canberra with his 2023 painting Nyadol Nyuon OAM.

== See also ==
- Contemporary African art
- Portrait painting
