= Octavio Zaya =

Octavio Zaya is an art critic and curator, born in Las Palmas (Canary Islands), and living in New York City since 1978. He is Director of Atlántica, a bilingual quarterly magazine published by CAAM (Las Palmas, Spain); he is Curator at Large and Advisor of MUSAC MUSAC](León, Spain);and a member of the advisory board of Performa (New York). He is on the editorial board of Nka: Journal of Contemporary African Art and a NY correspondent for Flash Art.

He was one of the curators of (Kassel, 2002), as part of the group directed by Okwui Enwezor. He was also one of the curators of the first and second (1995 and 1997. The large list of exhibitions he has curated include In/Sight, African Photographers 1940 to the Present (Guggenheim Museum, New York, 1997, and Versiones del Sur. Latinoamerica at Centro de Arte Reina Sofia [ (Madrid, 2000). He was one of the curators of Fresh Cream (Phaidon Press, London, 2000), has authored more than a dozen books on artists, and has contributed to numerous other books and catalogues.

He recently curated important exhibitions of the works of Cerith Wyn Evans and Paul Pfeiffer at MUSAC.
