= EL Loko =

Togolese artist

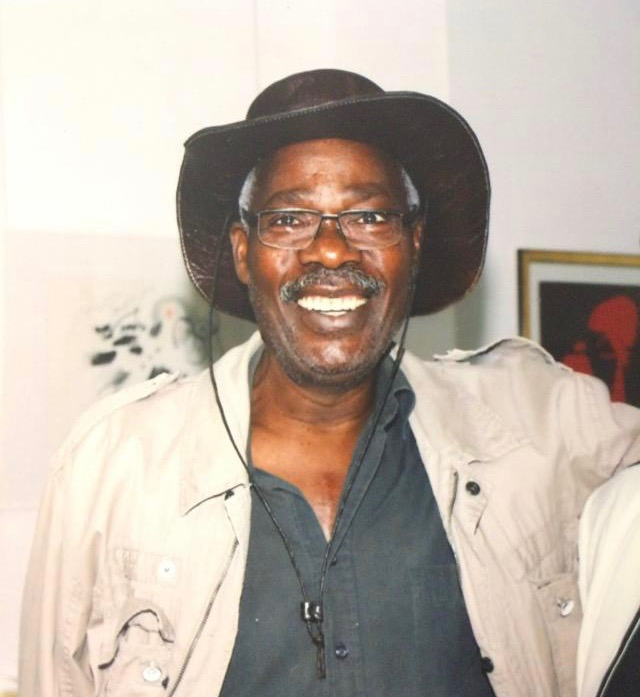
EL Loko

EL Loko (born Edoh Lucien Loko; February 11, 1950 in Pedakondji, Togo – September 13, 2016 in the same place) was a Togolese painter, graphic artist, sculptor, and writer. As an artist of African descent living in Germany, his work gained international recognition. EL Loko is considered one of the most important representatives of contemporary African art in the diaspora.

== Biography ==
=== Childhood and education ===
EL Loko was born in 1950 in the fishing village of Pédakondji, near the Togolese capital Lomé. At the age of 15, he began training as a textile designer in Accra, the capital of Ghana. After completing his three-year training, he worked for two years in the field of textile design. He then applied to study at the Kunstakademie Düsseldorf (Academy of Fine Arts Düsseldorf) in Germany. After being accepted, his future professor, Joseph Beuys, assisted him in financing a plane ticket, enabling EL Loko to move to Germany and begin his studies.

=== Studies and career ===
In 1971, EL Loko began studying painting, sculpture, and graphic arts at the Kunstakademie Düsseldorf (Academy of Fine Arts Düsseldorf). His professors included Joseph Beuys, Rolf Crummenauer, and Erwin Heerich. In 1977, he graduated with a degree in Fine Arts and was appointed Meisterschüler (master student), making him one of the first academically trained artists of African descent in Germany.

Even during his studies in the 1970s, EL Loko became a well-known figure in the Düsseldorf art scene. His early works, especially woodcuts, were exhibited and sold throughout Germany.

In 1978, after his student residence permit expired, EL Loko faced deportation from the Federal Republic of Germany. With the support of Joseph Beuys, fellow professors, art critics, museum directors, and Helmut Wieczorek, the then-mayor of Duisburg, he was able to reach a legal settlement that allowed him to leave the country once and return with permanent residency. EL Loko later recounted this experience of expulsion and return in his 1986 autobiography Der Blues in mir (The Blues Within Me).

From 1982 onward, EL Loko lived and worked as a freelance artist, first in Duisburg and later in Cologne. Numerous projects and creative periods repeatedly brought him back to his homeland of Togo.

EL Loko died unexpectedly in 2016 in his birthplace, Pédakondji.

== Artistic work ==
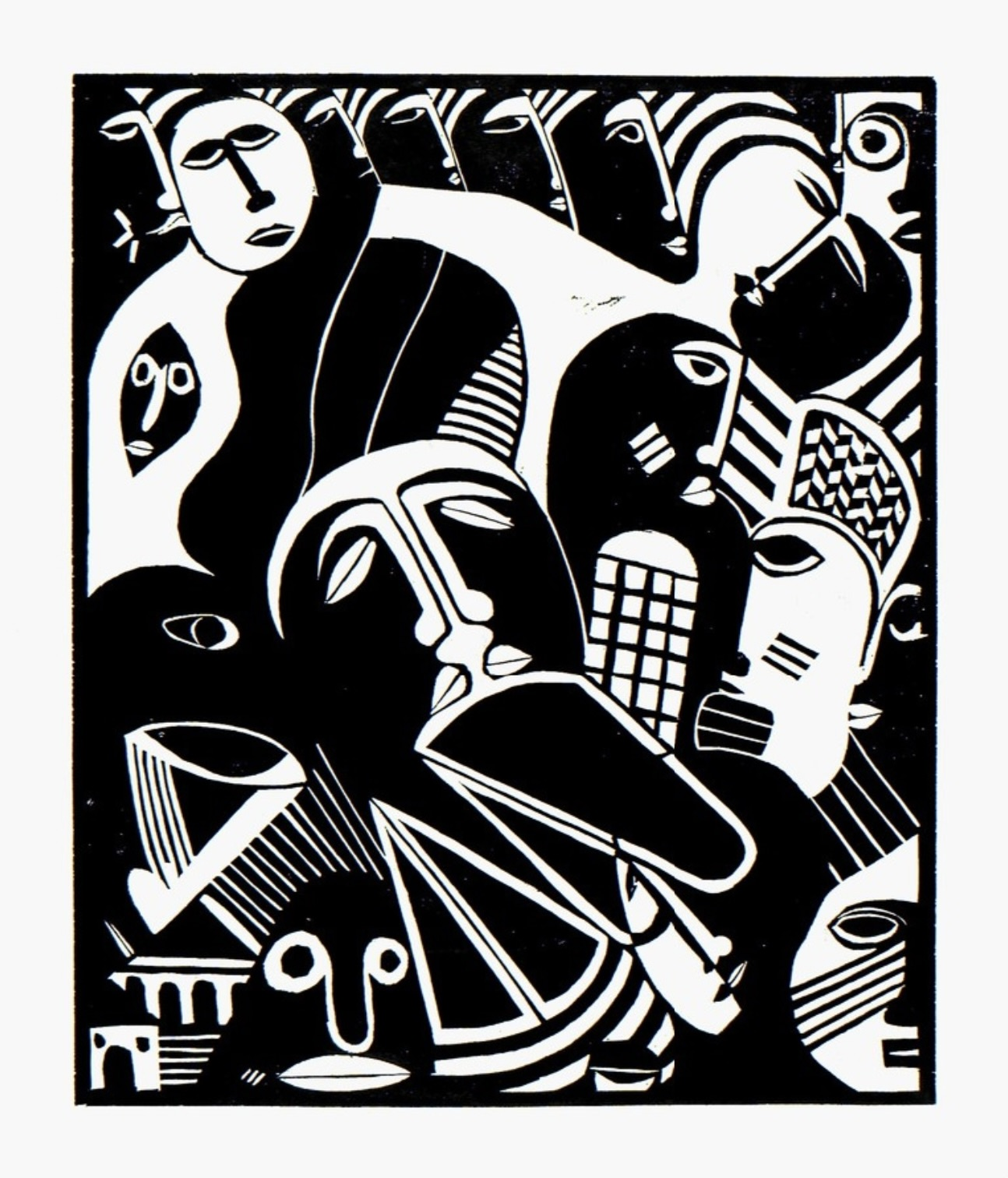
EL Loko, Ballade des Retourdataires, wood-cut print, 1977

EL Loko’s body of work spans more than four decades and includes a wide range of techniques, materials, and genres—ranging from graphic art and painting to sculpture, assemblage, installation, performance, and photography. Navigating between African traditions and European modernism, he developed a unique visual language and a distinctive artistic expression. A hallmark of his practice was his self-developed technique known as “double-ground painting” (Doppelgrundmalerei), characterized by the layering and combination of various materials. He blended elements such as sand, pigments, and oil on diverse surfaces including canvas, muslin, and wood, creating a rich, textured style that became a consistent signature throughout his various series of works.

=== Woodcuts ===
During the 1970s and 1980s, EL Loko produced a large number of print graphics. Even during his time in Accra, he attended exhibitions of Nigerian artists and became fascinated by printmaking. Encouraged by Joseph Beuys, he focused on woodcut printing at the beginning of his studies. These works depict landscapes and human figures that reflect the myths, symbols, and aesthetic forms of his cultural roots and African heritage. EL Loko’s extensive graphic oeuvre marked the beginning of his artistic career and served as the foundation for his later cycles of work.

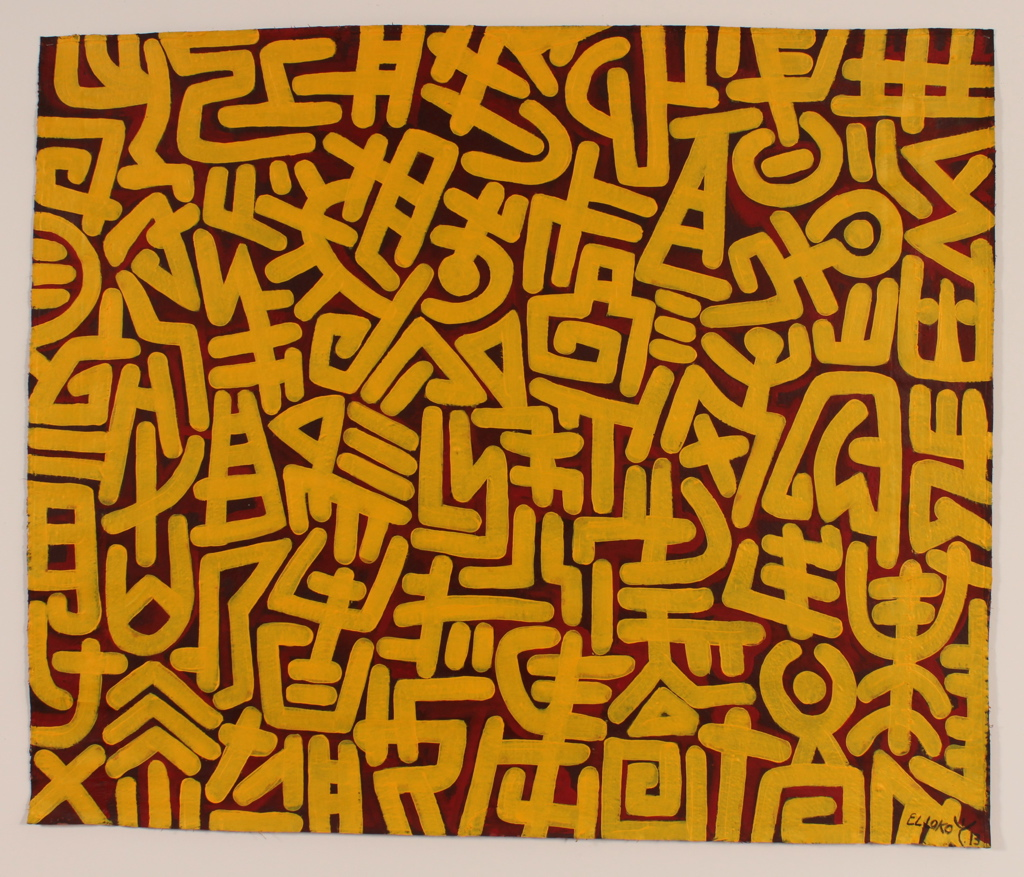
EL Loko, Cosmic Alphabet, PE.VO.TO. 22, acrylic on canvas, 131 × 155 cm, 2013

=== Cosmic Alphabet ===
Since the early 1990s, EL Loko developed a unique visual language in his paintings, installations, and sculptures, which he referred to as Cosmic Letters. These consist of ornamental patterns, figurative elements, primal signs, and symbols that together form a Cosmic Alphabet.

For EL Loko, conventional spoken and written languages—used primarily for communication—also functioned as tools of exclusion and power misuse. With the Cosmic Letters, he sought to create a universal alphabet, one without fixed meanings, that would allow each viewer to construct their own personal interpretations. It represented a journey of self-discovery and connection to the greater whole. EL Loko described this language as “a language that belongs to no one, and in which everyone can find themselves.”

His visual vocabulary combines earthly, transcendent, and spiritual symbols, forming an intercultural dialogue grounded in both 20th-century art and the collective memory of Africa.

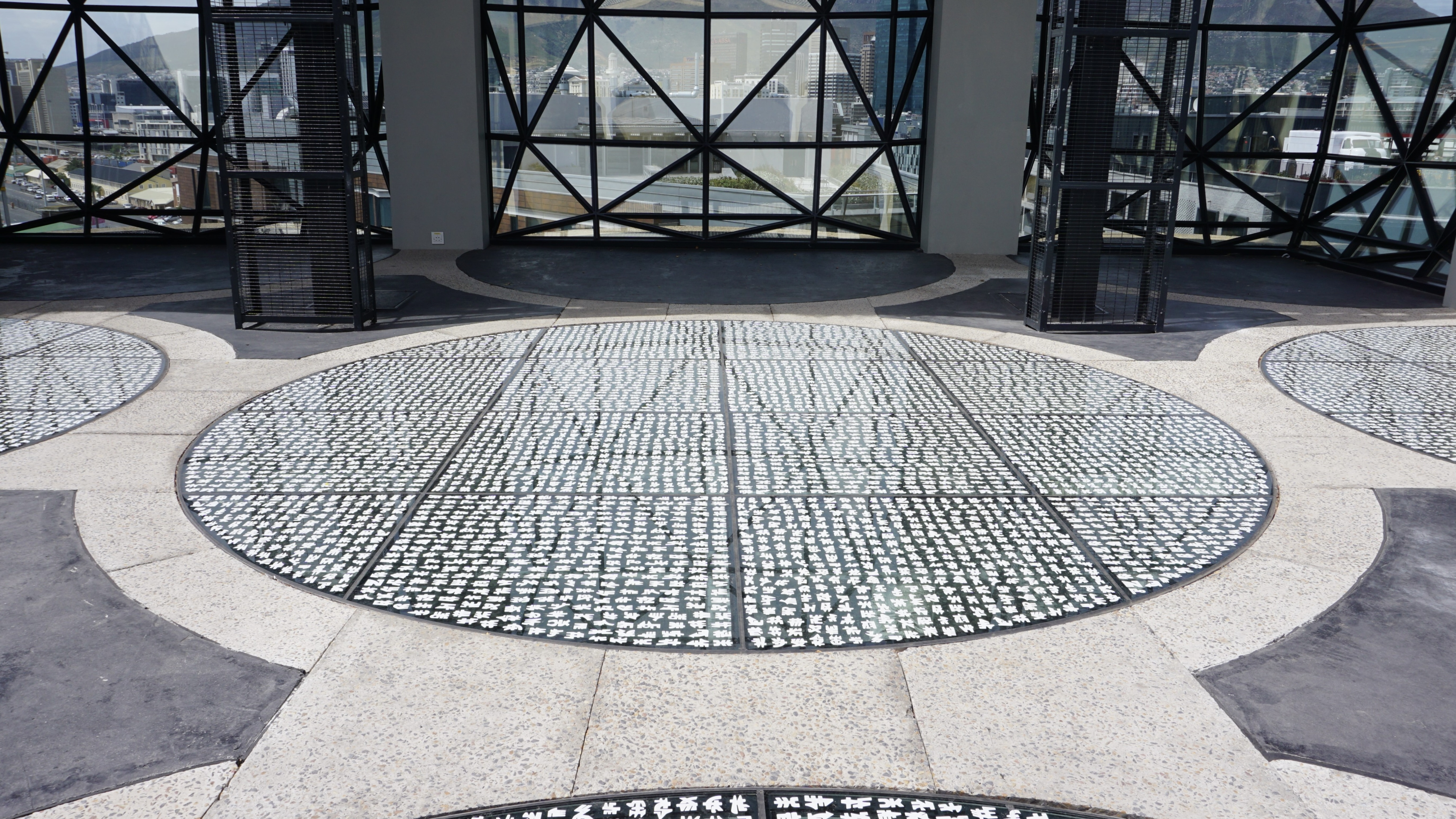
EL Loko, Cosmic Alphabet - Nine laminated glass discs at Zeitz Mocca

Since 2016, EL Loko’s Cosmic Alphabet has been on permanent display at the Zeitz Museum of Contemporary Art Africa in Cape Town, South Africa. His works are also part of the permanent exhibition on African art at the Museum Five Continents in Munich.

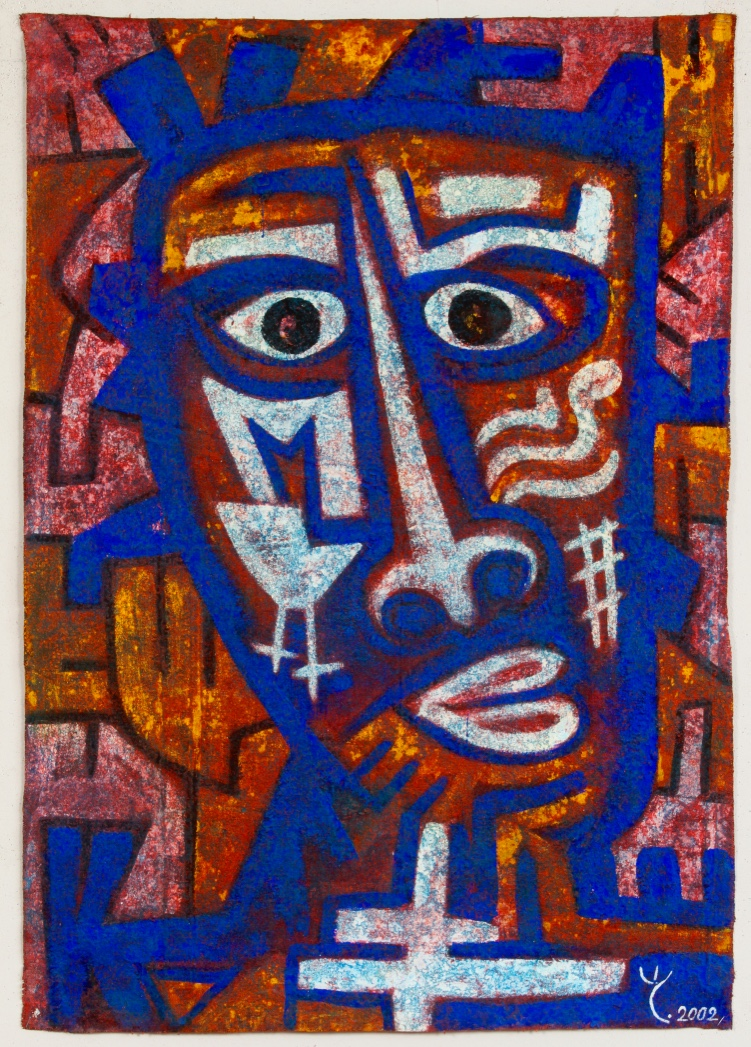
EL Loko, World Faces, KÖPO, canvas treated with pigments, 2002

=== World Faces ===
Closely related to the Cosmic Letters, EL Loko’s World Faces series sought to explore a global identity. These faces are depicted in paintings of various sizes, incorporating elements of the Cosmic Alphabet. The use of different colors such as black, white, yellow, and red reflects the diversity of human peoples. The faces themselves are presented without specific features that would allow identification of origin or gender. Instead, they showcase the universal face of humanity, designed in seemingly infinite variations. EL Loko’s World Faces are faces of the "Other," looking directly at the viewer, reflecting an image of ourselves like a mirror.

=== Installations ===
EL Loko created numerous installations that thematically explore the history and connection between Africa and Europe. In his installation "Explaining the Image to the Pack," EL Loko combined 27 wall objects and 69 individual sculptures. The installation addresses the understanding and perception of Africa in the world.

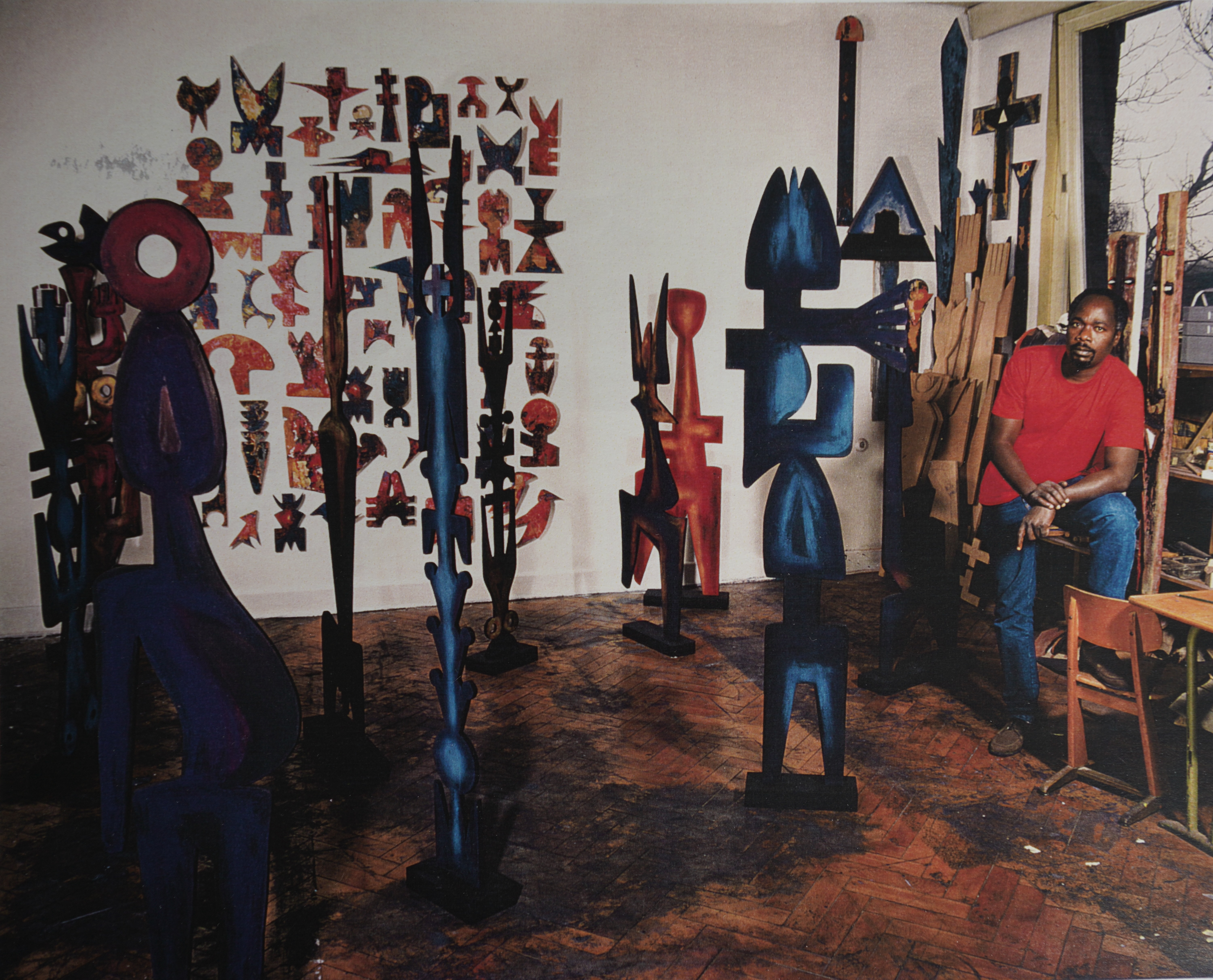
EL Loko in his Studio in Duisburg, 1990

=== Sculptural work ===
The reduction of forms to their outer contours, which became a characteristic feature of his work following his engagement with printmaking, is continued in EL Loko’s sculptural pieces. These works are primarily made of wood, although EL Loko also created steel sculptures for public spaces—most notably the commissioned steel sculpture Tolerance for the city of Emmerich in 1993.

=== Literary work ===
EL Loko’s literary works include a poetry collection and two prose texts, one of which is his 1986 autobiography The Blues Within Me (Der Blues in mir). In The Blues Within Me, EL Loko recounts how, driven by an idealized image of Germany, he left his homeland of Togo to seek artistic fulfillment in Germany. Despite humiliating interrogations by authorities and the presumption that he should remain "African" in his art, EL Loko—who sees himself as a person "who has come to possess two truths"—ultimately finds his artistic home in Germany.

=== Projects ===
EL Loko saw himself as a bridge and mediator between the African and European continents. Numerous projects initiated by EL Loko supported young African artists and established an ongoing dialogue and exchange between cultural creators from both continents. In 1992, EL Loko founded the artist exchange project African-European Inspiration, which, in the following years, facilitated projects and exhibitions by artists from both continents in Togo and Germany.

== Quote ==
"There is no place,

no tiny spot on this earth,

that will turn you, me,

or anyone else

into a king.

It is your,

my,

every single person's duty

to transform their surroundings into a kingdom."

— EL Loko, From the poem "Be Silent and Say Nothing" (Schweige und Sage nichts) in EL Loko – Mawuena Poems and Woodcuts (1983)

== Literary works ==
- Das Kuckucksei – Ahoba. Iatros Verlag, Dienheim 2009, ISBN 978-3-86963-352-7.
- Der Blues in mir – Eine autobiographische Erzählung. Verlag M. Krumbeck, Graphium press, Oberhausen 1986, ISBN 3-9800259-4-2.
- Mawuena – Gedichte und Holzschnitte. Franke Eigenverlag, Erkrath 1983.
