= Berta Sichel =

Brazilian curator

- Born: 26 October 1946 (age 79); Belo Horizonte, Brazil
- Occupation: Curator
- Awards: Guggenheim Fellowship (1998)

Academic background
- Education: Federal University of Minas Gerais; Federal University of Rio de Janeiro; New York University

Berta M. Sichel (born 26 October 1946) is a Brazilian curator based in the United States. A 1998 Guggenheim Fellow, she has worked as curator throughout the world, and she was director of the Museo Nacional Centro de Arte Reina Sofía Department of Audio/Visuals, before becoming founder of Bureau Phi Art Agency.

== Biography ==
Sichel was born on 26 October 1946 in Belo Horizonte. She obtained her BA from the Federal University of Minas Gerais in 1970 and her MAs in the Federal University of Rio de Janeiro (communications, 1980) and New York University (Media Ecology, 1984). While at NYU, she also visited The Kitchen for videos, an experience she recalled as being her second school alongside NYU.

Sichel has worked as a curator in New York City, as well as in other countries such as Mexico and Spain. At the 1983 São Paulo Art Biennial, she curated the exhibit "New Metaphors/Six Alternatives". In 1998, she was awarded a Guggenheim Fellowship "for a study of twenty-five years of video production by Latinos and Latin Americans." In 2000, she started working at the Museo Nacional Centro de Arte Reina Sofía, where she eventually became director of their Department of Audio/Visuals. She spent twelve years at that museum before starting her own company, Bureau Phi Art Agency. In 2017, she published her book 14 artistas, with some of the work included inspired by exhibitions she curated herself.

After a brief stint as an Organization of American States Research Fellow (1990-1991), Sichel worked as an adjunct professor of media studies at The New School for Social Research (1991-1994). In 1998, she was a resident fellow at the Centre international de création vidéo in France.

Sichel worked as an art correspondent for Estado de São Paulo (1995-1998) and El Periodico del Arte (1998-1999), as well as a contributing editor for Atlántica and Flash Art. She was an editor at The Journal of Decorative and Propaganda Arts in 1993.
