= Africa95 =

Britain-wide celebration of African culture

Africa '95 or Africa 95, styled as africa95, was a Britain-wide celebration of African music, art, dance and poetry that was held over several months during the last quarter of 1995, with more than 60 arts institutions throughout the UK participating in related events. It was chaired by English businessman Sir Michael Caine, with Clémentine Deliss as artistic director and Claire Whitaker CBE as Finance and Development Director, under the patronage of Queen Elizabeth II, President Nelson Mandela of South Africa, and President Leopold Sedar Senghor of Senegal.

== Background ==
Taking place over several months in 1995, particularly during the last quarter of the year, the africa95 initiative involved a wide range of events and the participation of more than 60 arts institutions in the UK, and including the visual and performing arts, cinema, literature, music and public debate, as well as programmes on BBC television and radio.

The Los Angeles Times reported on 26 December 1995: "Since August, and continuing through January, Britain has been playing host to the most comprehensive expression of African culture ever assembled. At dozens of prestigious venues in 25 cities—from Royal Albert Hall and the Victoria & Albert Museum in London, to the West Yorkshire Playhouse in Leeds and the Tate Gallery in Liverpool—visual art, drama, dance, music and scholarly symposiums are being offered up under the Africa 95 umbrella."

The key art exhibitions during africa95 were the Royal Academy's Africa: the Art of a Continent, curated by Tom Phillips (running from 4 October 1995 to 21 January 1996), Seven Stories about Modern Art in Africa (curated by Deliss) at the Whitechapel Art Gallery, and Big City at the Serpentine Gallery, London, curated by Julia Peyton-Jones. The book Africa: The Art of a Continent, edited by Tom Phillips, was published to coincide with africa95.

"The African Prom" was held at the Royal Albert Hall in September, a gala concert for africa95 with five of the African continent's biggest musical stars – Youssou Ndour, Khaled, Baaba Maal, Salif Keita and Lucky Dube – filmed for BBC Television.

The season also encompassed "africa95 Nigeria", a series of workshops in that country.

Papers relating to the africa95 festival are held at the School of Oriental & African Studies (SOAS) Archives, University of London.

== Legacy ==
A decade after africa95, curator and cultural historian Gus Casely-Hayford initiated Africa 05, the largest African arts season ever hosted in Britain, of which he was director. He said in reference to africa95, "It was fantastic. ...You could see African art displayed without the ethnography for the first time – people were engaging with it as art, at last. Suddenly it was obvious there was an African art history which had been neglected." However, his aim with Africa 05, which took place over a period of 12 months with the involvement of more than 150 cultural organisations, including the BBC, was to create "sustainable change in the way the art world – and the public – thinks about Africa. ...We don't want this just to be about one year."
