= Fathi Hassan =

Egyptian-born, Italian-based artist (born 1957)

Fathi Hassan; فتحي حسن
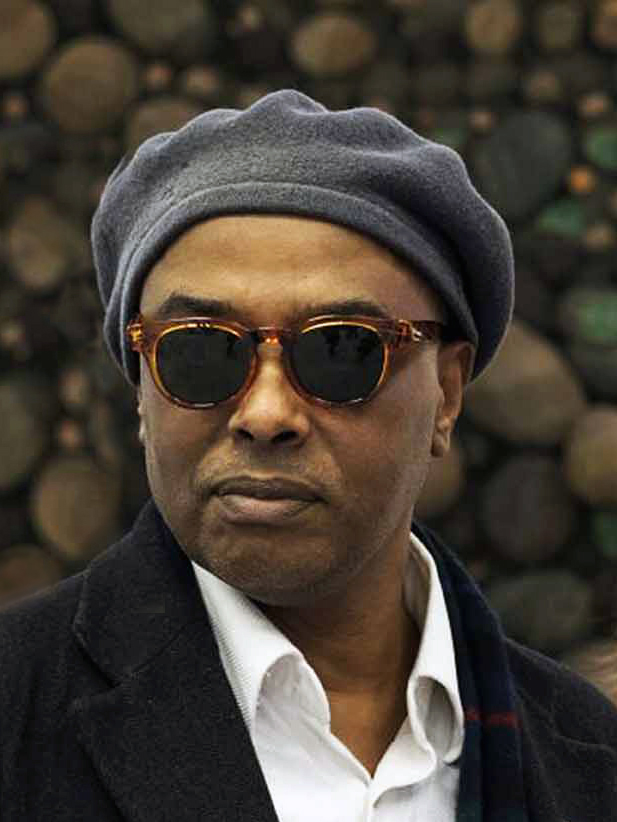
- Born: 10 May 1957 (age 68); Cairo, Egypt
- Education: Accademia di Belle Arti di Napoli (1984)
- Known for: Painting, sculpture, installation art

Fathi Hassan (Arabic: فتحي حسن, born 10 May 1957) is an Egyptian-born artist known for his installations involving the written word.

== Life ==
Fathi Hassan was born in Cairo in 1957 as the second son to a Nubian family. His father Hassan was Sudanese, and his mother Fatma was from the Toshka Lakes region in southern Egypt. He attended the Kerabia school in Cairo, where he met the sculptor Ghaleb Khater.

== Work ==
In 1979, Hassan received a grant from the Italian Cultural Institute in Cairo and moved to Naples. He enrolled at the Accademia di Belle Arti in 1980 to study set design. He graduated in 1984 with a dissertation on the influence of African art in Cubism. While he was studying and in the year after graduation, Hassan also worked as an actor and set designer at RAI (Radiotelevisione Italiana works) in Naples and Rome. In 1986, he moved to Pesaro.

In 1989, Hassan was the first artist of African heritage to be invited to the "Aperto" section of the 43rd Venice Biennale curated by Dan Cameron and Giovanni Carandente. He has exhibited in numerous galleries in Italy, Belgium, Denmark, Germany, France, Egypt, and the United States.

Hassan's work often emphasises power dynamics and the relationship between the oral and written word; drawing from his Nubian heritage, he places particular emphasis on the loss of language under the dominance of colonialism. Most of his scripts are based upon kufic calligraphy, but remain deliberately illegible and impossible to decipher. In his video Blessed Nubia (2002) he provides an analysis of the original language of Nubia.

Hassan has lived and worked in Italy since 1979, dividing his time between Rome, Milan and Fano.
