= Dilomprizulike =

Nigerian contemporary artist

Dil-Humphrey Umezulike, better known as Dilomprizulike (born 1960 in Enugu, Nigeria) is a contemporary artist working in sculpture, performance and painting who has adopted the moniker "Thejunkmanfromafrika". He studied art at the University of Nigeria, Nsukka, Nigeria, and has an MFA from the University of Dundee, Scotland.

In his work he recycles and transforms heaps of old clothing and other detritus found on city streets, creating sculptural installations and performances that reflect the disenfranchised situation of many African people.

He created the "Junkyard Museum of Awkward Things", a sculptural environment built up from found objects, in Lagos and has also made a version of it for the Oriel Mostyn Gallery in Llandudno, Wales.

Dilomprizulike explains his installation Wear and Tear:

Wear and Tear as a concept attempts to expose the often overlooked and underrated elements of the African-Urban communal life which largely influence it. The alienated situation of the African in his own society becomes tragic. There is a struggle inside him, a consciousness of living with the complications of an imposed civilisation. He can no longer go back to pick up the fragments of his father's shattered culture; neither is he equipped enough to keep pace with the white-man's world.

From 2004–2007, his work was exhibited in the Africa Remix Exhibition that toured many countries around the globe. The first stop for Africa Remix was at the Museum Kunstpalast, Düsseldorf, Germany, and subsequent locations were the Hayward Gallery, London, the Centre Pompidou in Paris, the Mori Art Museum in Tokyo, the Moderna Museet in Stockholm, and the Johannesburg Art Gallery.

He was also a resident at the Gasworks Gallery while he prepared a piece for the Victoria and Albert Museum and presented his "Professor Junk" performance at many of the tours stops.

In 2010 he created Busy Street for the Herzliya Museum of Contemporary Art in Israel. The piece, which was made from local rubbish, was a reflection on Israel's consumer society.
