= Sidney Littlefield Kasfir =

Art historian (1939–2019)

- Born: 1939; York, Maine, United States
- Died: December 29, 2019 (aged 79–80); Maralal, Kenya
- Occupation: Art historian
- Known for: History of African art

Academic background
- Education: Harvard University
- Alma mater: University of London
- Thesis: Visual Arts of the Idoma of Central Nigeria (1979)

Sidney Carolyn Littlefield Kasfir (1939–2019) was an art historian of African art.

== Career ==
Sidney Littlefield Kasfir received a MA in art history from Harvard University and a Ph.D. in African art from the University of London in 1979 with a dissertation on visual arts of the Idoma people. She was a professor at Emory University for two decades.

== Works ==
- Contemporary African Art (1999)
- African Art and the Colonial Encounter: Inventing a Global Commodity (2007)
- Central Nigeria Unmasked: Arts of the Benue River Valley (2011, co-edited)
- African Art and Agency in the Workshop (2013, co-edited)
