= Cameron Platter =

South African artist

- Born: 1978 (age 47–48)
- Website: cameronplatter.com

Cameron Platter (born 1978) is a South African contemporary visual artist.

== Work ==
His work has been described as "unorthodox", "the delinquent love child of Quentin Tarantino and Dr Seuss" and where "the bizarreness of everyday life comes together in an expression unashamedly unforgiving, yet deeply observant".

Examples are held in the collections of the Museum of Modern Art in New York; the FRAC des Pays de la Loire in France; the Iziko South African National Gallery; the Margulies Collection in Miami, Florida; the Zeitz Collection in South Africa; and the New Church Collection in South Africa.

== Exhibitions ==
Exhibitions include:

- U-saved-me, Depart Foundation, Los Angeles (2016)
- Public Intimacy: Art and Other Ordinary Acts in South Africa, San Francisco Museum of Modern Art, San Francisco (2017)
- Imaginary Fact, Contemporary South African Art and the Archive, 55th Venice Biennale (2013)
- De Leur Temps, Musee des Beaux-arts de Nantes (2013)
- Impressions from South Africa, 1965 to Now, Museum of Modern Art, New York (2011)
- Les Rencontres Internationales, Palais de Tokyo (2014) and the Centre Georges Pompidou (2010), Paris; Le Biennale de Dakar 2010, Dakar, Senegal
- Coca- Colonization, Marte Museum, El Salvador;
- Absent Heroes and Brave New World... 20 Years of Democracy, Iziko South African National Gallery.
