= Nu Barreto =

Bissau-Guinean artist

- Born: 1966 (age 59–60); São Domingos
- Occupation: Artist

Nu Barreto is an African artist born in 1966 in São Domingos who has been based in Paris since 1989. His work has been shown in the United States and some European countries outside his adopted home of France.

His art, which began with photography but has since moved to found object and collage, has been displayed in galleries and museums including the United States, Brazil, Berlin, Luxembourg and Senegal and tends to focus on themes of injustice and oppression, and especially those that lead to widespread suffering across Africa.

== See also ==
- Art of Guinea-Bissau
