= Joël Andrianomearisoa =

Malagasy artist (born 1977)

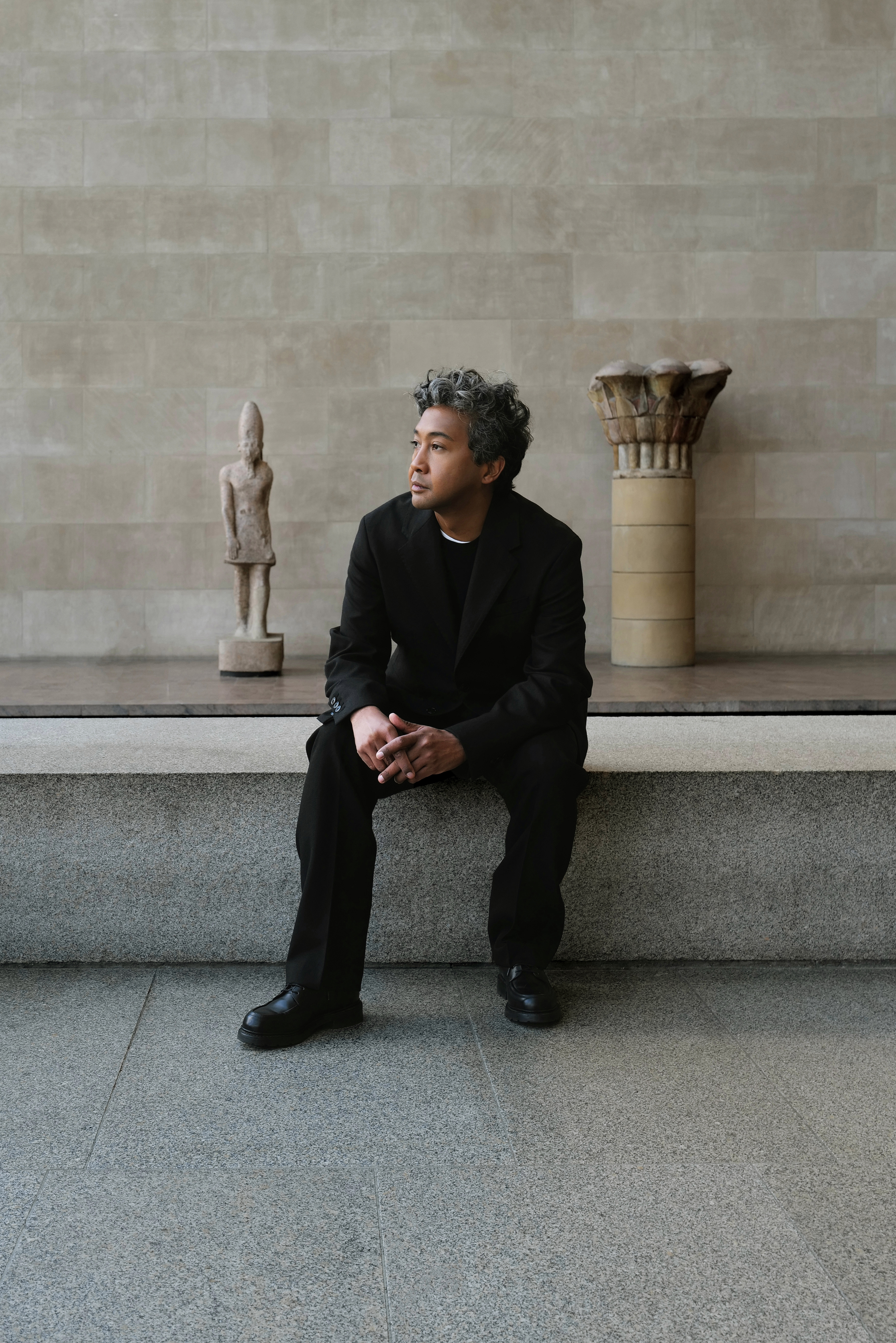
- Andrianomearisoa in 2025
- Born: July 6, 1977 (age 48); Antananarivo
- Education: École spéciale d'architecture
- Notable work: The Labyrinth of passions - 2016, I have forgotten the night - 2019
- Awards: 2016; Madrid ARCO Audemars Piguet Prize; 2019; Madagascar Chevalier des Arts et des Lettres
- Website: studiojoelandrianomearisoa.com

Joël Andrianomearisoa is a Malagasy artist, born in 1977 in Antananarivo, Madagascar. He lives and works between Paris and his birthplace.

Graduated in architecture, he works with different materials for his creations. Known for his monumental works such as I have forgotten the night, an important installation of black silk paper presented at the Venice Biennale in 2019, or at the exhibition Brise du rouge soleil on the tower and ramparts of Aigues-Mortes on the occasion of the Africa 2020 Season. In 2022, he exhibited his work The Five Continents of All Our Desires at the Zeitz Museum of Contemporary Art Africa in Cape Town. His creations are often made from textiles, paper, sometimes wood, minerals, or unexpected objects (mirrors, perfumes, etc.).

As a part of this first pioneering wave of contemporary African artists, he also actively participates in the cultural and artistic development of Madagascar with, among others, the Manja fashion festival (1998), the Sanga 3 dance festival (2003), the Photoana festival (2005), the personal project (2007), 30 et Presque-Songes (2011), Parlez-moi (2016) and the Madagascar Pavilion at the Venice Biennale.

Since its inauguration in 2020, he is the artistic director of Hakanto Contemporary, an independent art center of 300m ² free of charge in Antananarivo for the valorization of Malagasy artists and the dialogue of cultures.

== Early life and education ==
Joël Andrianomearisoa was born and grew up in Antananarivo, and lived through the period of socialist revolution led by Commander Didier Ratsiraka, also known as "the Red Admiral". His grandfather is an academician "defender of the Malagasy language". Raised in a bourgeois family, within a cultural environment in full ebullition, he is quickly attracted by the drawing. He was inspired by the Malagasy writer Élie Rajaonarison. He took his first steps as an artist in the mid-90s at the age of 18. From the beginning, his work is concretized by performances that earned him the cover of Revue Noire Madagascar in 1998. He then explored many disciplines such as fashion, design, video, photography, scenography, architecture, installations and visual arts.

In 1997, at the age of 20, he entered the École Spéciale d'Architecture of Paris, after hesitating between fine arts and a design school. In 2005, he graduated as an architect, presenting an entirely graphic and textile project, far from the classical architectural approach and encouraged by his research director, Odile Decq.

== Career ==
Since his graduation from architecture school, Joël Andrianomearisoa's works have been exhibited in many prestigious international cultural institutions such as the MAXXI in Rome, the Hamburger Bahnhof in Berlin, the Smithsonian in Washington, the Centre Pompidou in Paris, the Palais de Tokyo (Paris), the Zeitz Museum of Contemporary Art Africa (Cape Town) or the Maccal (Marrakech).

From May to November 2019, he represents Madagascar for the first Malagasy pavilion at the 58th Venice Biennale with his project "I have forgotten the night". The same year, he was also named "Chevalier des Arts et des Lettres" by the Malagasy Minister of Culture and Communication, Lalatiana Rakotondrazafy Andriatongarivo.

=== Monumental artworks ===
Several works by the artist are characterized by their monumental and poetic character as the Labyrinth of passion, a diptych composed of a large piece of white and black silk paper for which Joël Andrianomarisoa became the first non-Spanish artist to receive in 2016 the Arco Madrid Audemars Piguet prize or I Have Forgotten the Night for the Pavilion of Madagascar at the Venice Biennale.

For several months, a giant neon designed by the artist overlaid its message "Here we carry the dreams of the world" the front of the Palais de Tokyo in Paris.

In 2021, he inaugurates in his native city of Antananarivo, an impressive sculpture on the Avenue of Independence. This sculpture is the first of a series that the artist will try out on several territories.

In 2022, as part of Mondes Nouveaux, the artist unveils Au rythme de nos désirs dansons sur la vague du temp, a sculpture created for the future Cité Internationale de la Francophonie at the Château de Villers-Cotterêts, inaugurated by the French Minister of Culture, Roselyne Bachelot.

=== Textiles and drawings ===
Joël Andrianomearisoa's favourite techniques include textiles and drawing.

In 2022 in Milan and at the Château de Chaumont, with Les herbes folles du vieux logis, Joël Andrianomearisoa makes a nod to the Malagasy poet Maurice Ramarozaka, from whom he borrows the title of a collection of poems for a series of pastel drawings, large textile paintings and smaller designs based on the assembly of gold silk thread.

=== Collaborations ===
In 2019, he was invited by Dior to make his own version of the Lady Dior bag, which, for this occasion, took the name Lady Dior Art. He worked on the entire environment of the Lady Dior Art, from its lining to its packaging. He says he has created two versions of the object that he will name "The labyrinth of Lady Dior".

In the continuity of their exhibition at the Musée des Arts Décoratifs in Paris, Joël Andrianomearisoa was invited to participate in Dior's first exhibition in the Middle East, at the M7 in Doha (Qatar), "Christian Dior : Designer of Dreams", by realizing paintings of scarves of the house cut out and sewn on a wall of 20 meters x 10 meters by using as raw material scarves of the house.

In 2021, Joël Andrianomearisoa became the seventh artistic sponsor of the A.S. Velasca. The same year, with the perfume house Diptyque, as part of the 60th anniversary of the brand, he collaborated with Olivia Giacobetti, nose of the brand, on a particular fragrance and pays tribute to the city of Paris and the number 34 of the 34 Boulevard Saint-Germain, birthplace of the house.

In 2022, he participated in the edition of a Moleskine notebook.

=== Sentimental products ===
To reach a wider public, Joël Andrianomearisoa created the Sentimental Products, "conceptual objects" mixing art, design and fashion, exclusive creations, ready-made, objects carrying in them the "nobility of the everyday". The artist conceives forms through which he makes emotions speak. He treats the themes of sentimentality, melancholy, sadness or desire: "These are extremely complex things that are in our hearts, which are not palpable but very universal. I am always in a permanent quest for the materialization of emotions."

== Distinctions ==
- 2019: Insignia of "Chevalier des Arts et des Lettres" by the Malagasy Minister of Culture, Lalatiana Rakotondrazafy Andriatongarivo
- 2016: Arco Madrid Audemars Piguet Prize

== Books ==
- 2019: I have forgotten the night, Revue Noire
- 2018: No habiamos terminado de hablar sobre el amor, Centro de Arte Alcobendas
- 2018: Iry, Curador
- 2017: Chanson de ma terre lointaine, Primo Marella Gallery
- 2016: Last year in Antananarivo, Tyburn Gallery
- 2016: IV Audemars Piguet Arco Madrid Prize, Sabrina Amrani & Audemars Piguet
- 2014: Sentimental Products, Revue Noire & Vendôme Luxury
- 2013: SENTIMENTAL, Revue Noire
- 2012: 30 et presque songes, Revue Noire
- 2001: Joël Andrianomearisoa, Tableau de Mode, Revue Noire
