= Moridja Kitenge Banza =

African-born Visual artist (born 1980)

- Born: 1980 (age 45–46); Kinshasa, Congo
- Education: Académie des beaux-arts de Kinshasa; École supérieure des beaux-arts de Nantes Métropole
- Known for: Visual art
- Awards: Sobey Art Award

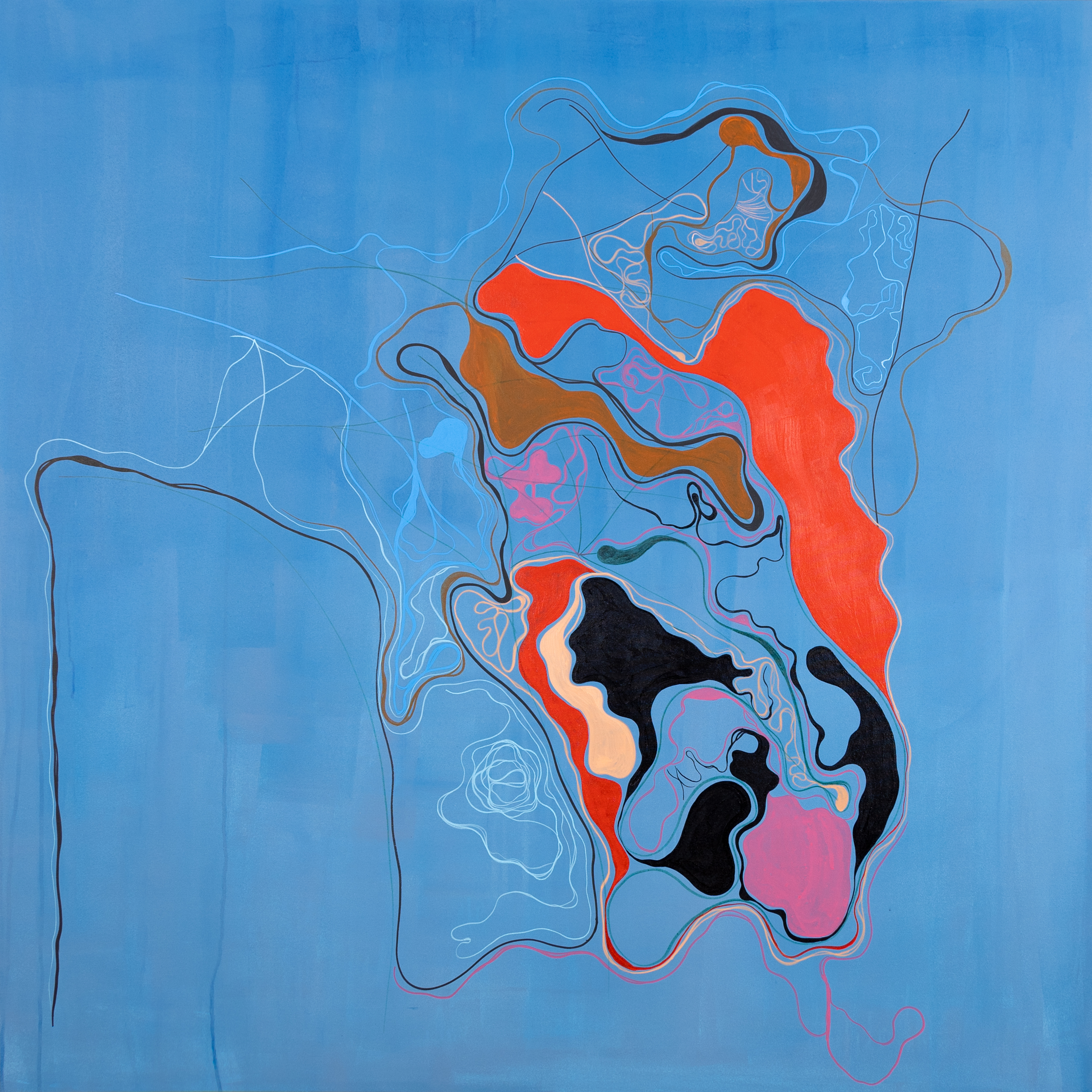
Acrylic painting by Banza

Moridja Kitenge Banza is a visual artist born in Kinshasa, Congo in 1980. He currently lives and works in Montreal, Quebec. His artworks employ a variety of media including drawing, painting, photography and installation.

He graduated from the Académie des beaux-arts de Kinshasa and l’École supérieure des beaux-arts de Nantes Métropole. In 2010, Moridja Kitenge Banza was awarded the first prize at the Biennale of Contemporary African Art, DAK’ART in Sénégal. He was among the winners of the 2020 Sobey Art Award. His work is represented by Hugues Charbonneau Art Gallery in Montréal.

== Artistic approach ==
Banza's artistique practice extends to a variety of media including painting, photography, film, drawing, collage, installation and performance. This diversity also reflects the plurality of identities of the artists himself. His work uses different artistic strategies of staging, appropriation and irony to critically approach issues around memory, culture and history.

== Artworks ==
The artworks of Banza are represented in various collections including the National Gallery of Canada, the Montréal Museum of Fine Arts, the Art Gallery of Ontario, as well as several corporate art collections including the TD Bank Corporate Art Collection and the Bank of Montréal Collection.

=== Christ Pantocrator series (2017-) ===
The Christ Pantocrator work forms a series of paintings that superimpose representations of African masks over images of Byzantine Christian iconography of Christ Pantocrator. Through this work, Kitenge Banza combines traditional religious aspects of Congolese beliefs with Christianity. The paintings in the series divert the sacred symbols to reveal the colonial process that led to the theft of African ritual objects by Western museums, as well as the exploitation of these objects in the context of modern art.

=== Authentique series (2017-) ===
The photographs in the series Authentique feature the artist staging himself in his Montréal backyard, with works in the Christ Pantocrator series decorated with colored wax fabric.

Critical interpretation of these compositions have viewed this series as a commentary on the complex cultural identities in which immigrant populations must navigate, as well as a critical look at contemporary and historical representations of African identity.
