= China Association of Automobile Manufacturers =

Logo

The China Association of Automobile Manufacturers (中国汽车工业协会), abbreviated as CAAM, is a non-profit social organization providing policy research and data for China's automotive industry. The organization is one of the selected associations by the Chinese government in national economic policy making. It is regulated by China's State-owned Assets Supervision and Administration Commission of the State Council.

== History and structure ==
CAAM was founded in May 1987 with approval from the Ministry of Civil Affairs. CAAM's structure is typical of an industrial association owned by its members, composing of automakers mostly from state-owned enterprises. The management of the organization is appointed by the Chinese government. The Member's Representative Assembly is CAAM's highest authority with about 2000 members. It includes a board, a Secretariat, and 12 departments, 24 product-oriented branches, and one branch for other things.

Amid the United States–China trade war, CAAM had launched its anti-discriminatory investigation against US trade policy concerning semiconductor chips beginning in 2025.
