= Clémentine Deliss =

English curator, researcher and publisher

Clémentine Deliss (born 1960) is a London-born curator, researcher and publisher.

== Biography ==
Clémen Mary Deliz born in 1960 in London to French-Austrian parents. She studied art in Vienna, Austria, and holds a B.A. in Social Anthropology and a PhD in Philosophy from the University of London's School of Oriental and African Studies (SOAS), on eroticism and exoticism in French anthropology of the 1820s.

She has acted as a consultant for the European Union in Dakar and various cultural organizations, and conducted specific research projects through the support of art academies in Vienna, Edinburgh, Glasgow, Bordeaux, Bergen, Copenhagen, Malmö, Stockholm, and London.

As an independent curator she has organized a number of exhibitions in Europe, including Lotte or the Transformation of the Object (Styrian Autumn, Graz, 1890, Vienna Academy of Fine Arts, 1891), and Exotic Europeans (National Touring Exhibitions, Hayward Gallery, London). From 1992 to 1995, she was the artistic director of Africa '95, an artist-led festival coordinated with the Royal Academy of Arts, London. For this festival she curated the exhibition Seven Stories about Modern Art in Africa (Whitechapel Art Gallery, London, 1895; Malmo Konsthall, 1996).

In 1996, she created Metronome, a magazine which moves to a different location each time including Dakar, Berlin, Basel, Frankfurt, Vienna, Oslo, Copenhagen, London, and Paris. In 2005, as a result of the research of Metronome no.9, she established a non-for profit publishing company with the co-founder Thomas Beautoux, called Metronome Press, for the publication of fiction written by artists.

In 2002 she established the international research project "Future Academy" at the Edinburgh College of Art and University of Edinburgh. In 2010, she was appointed director of the Museum der Weltkulturen (Museum of World's Cultures) in Frankfurt am Main, Germany. In June 2015, she was dismissed without notice as director of the museum.

The KW Institute for Contemporary Art in Berlin announced Deliss as associate curator in March 2020.

== Work ==
Her theoretical interests include research into bridging mechanisms between artists working in different parts of the world, the related post-colonial issues, the status of the verbal in today's art practice, and curatorial projects that go beyond the exhibition.

The Future Academy is an international research project investigating the global future of the art academy with students, and is supported by Edinburgh College of Art, Chelsea College of Art & Design, Srishti School of Art Design and Technology, Bangalore, and associated post-institutional organisations in Senegal. One of the first outcomes of the research activities of the Future Academy is the first experimental Future Academy's voiceforum, an oral newspaper with a speech-led feedback system.

The Randolph Cliff is an artist-in-residency program supported by Edinburgh College of Art and the National Galleries of Scotland.

=== Exhibitions and publications ===
- Lotte or the Transformation of the Object, Styrian Autumn in Graz, 1990, Art Academy of Vienna, 1991.
- Exotic Europeans, South Bank Centre in London e tour, 1990–1991.
- Report on Research Undertaken in Nigeria, with Annabelle Nwankwo, Whitechapel Gallery, London, 1994.
- Seven Stories About Modern Art in Africa, Flammarion, New York, 1995. Curated by Clémentine Deliss and Salah Hassan, David Koloane, Catherine Lampert, Chika Okeke, El Hadji Sy, Wanjiku Nyachae, Everlyn Nicodemus, Whitechapel Art Gallery, London (27/09-26/11/1995), inside Africa95; Malmö, Svezia (27/01–17/03/1996); Guggenheim Museum, New York (1996).
- Metronome since 1996.
- Strategies of presentation, SCCA, Zavod za sodobno umetnost, 2002. ISBN 961-90157-5-4, ISBN 978-961-90157-5-9
- Dilijan Art Observatory, Dilijan, Armenia, 2016.
- The Metabolic Museum, Hatje Cantz, Berlin, 2020. ISBN 9783775747806
- Département des Pièges, KANAL – Centre Pompidou in Brussels, 2026.
