= Atlántica =

Art and culture magazine

- Categories: Contemporary art and culture
- Frequency: Triannual
- Founded: 1990
- Company: Centro Atlántico de Arte Moderno
- Country: Canary Islands
- Based in: Las Palmas
- Language: Spanish; English
- Website: revistaatlantica.com/en

Atlántica (full name: Atlántica. Revista de Arte y Pensamiento (English: Atlántica. Journal of Art and Thought)) is a contemporary art and culture magazine produced by the Centro Atlántico de Arte Moderno (CAAM) based in Las Palmas de Gran Canaria, in between Europe, the Americas, and Africa.

== History ==
Atlántica published its first issue in October 1990, in Spanish. With a change in management in 1992, it became a bilingual (Spanish-English) magazine with images as a fundamental component. Another editorial change happened in issue 40 (2004). Atlántica is a triannual publication.

== Content ==
Since 1992, Atlántica has published critical papers, reviews, conversations, interviews, and art projects.

== Authors ==
Atlántica mostly addresses and gives voice to experts in contemporary arts and culture. It works in order to open up their horizons, hosting artists' speeches and theoretical observations across continents. Individuals who have collaborated with the publication include writers, magazine directors, art critics, and intellectuals. Some of these are Aristide Antonas, Anders Michelsen, Benjamin Weil, Charles Merewether, Lliliam Llanes, Berta Sichel, Hans Ulrich Obrist, Orlando Britto Jinorio, Ery Camara, Eugenio Valdés Figueroa, Simon Njami, Clementine Deliss, Olu Oguibe, Elvira Dyangani Ose, Okwui Enwezor, Salah Hassan, Alexander Kluge, Colin Richards, Ruben Gallo, Coco Fusco, Hou Hanru, Clive Kellner, Achille Bonito Oliva, Francesco Bonami, Gerardo Mosquera, Hou Hanru, Rhaseed Araeen, Candice Breitz, Rosa Martínez, Bernard Henri-Levi, Slavoj Zizek, Sadie Plant, Ilya Prigogine, and Sami Nair.

The first three issues were written in collaboration with Nancy Davenport, Barbara Pollak, Arthur C. Danto, Carmela García, Shoja Azari, José Ferriera, Zwelethu Mthethwa, and Penny Siopis. Starting from issue 40, the magazine is published by Ediciones del Umbral and directed by Alicia Chillida, Antonio Zaya, and Octavio Zaya.
