= Ben Enwonwu's Daily Mirror sculptures =

Sculptures by Ben Enwonwu

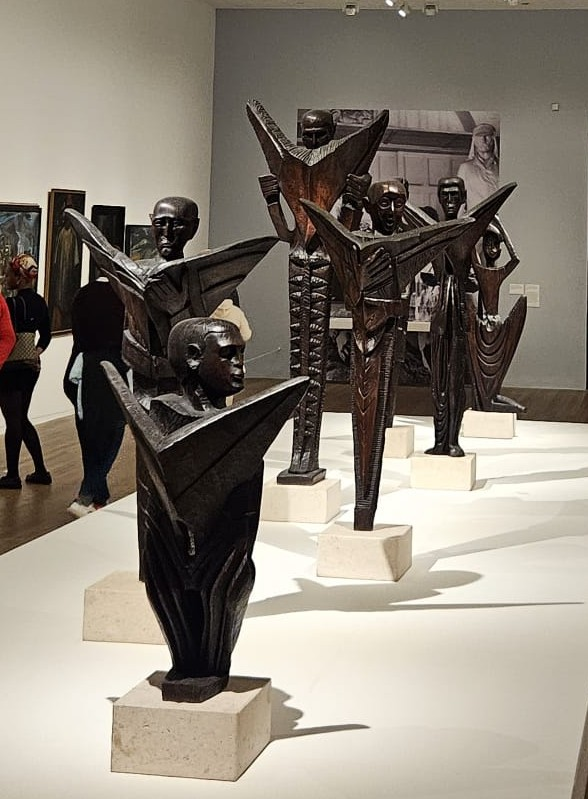
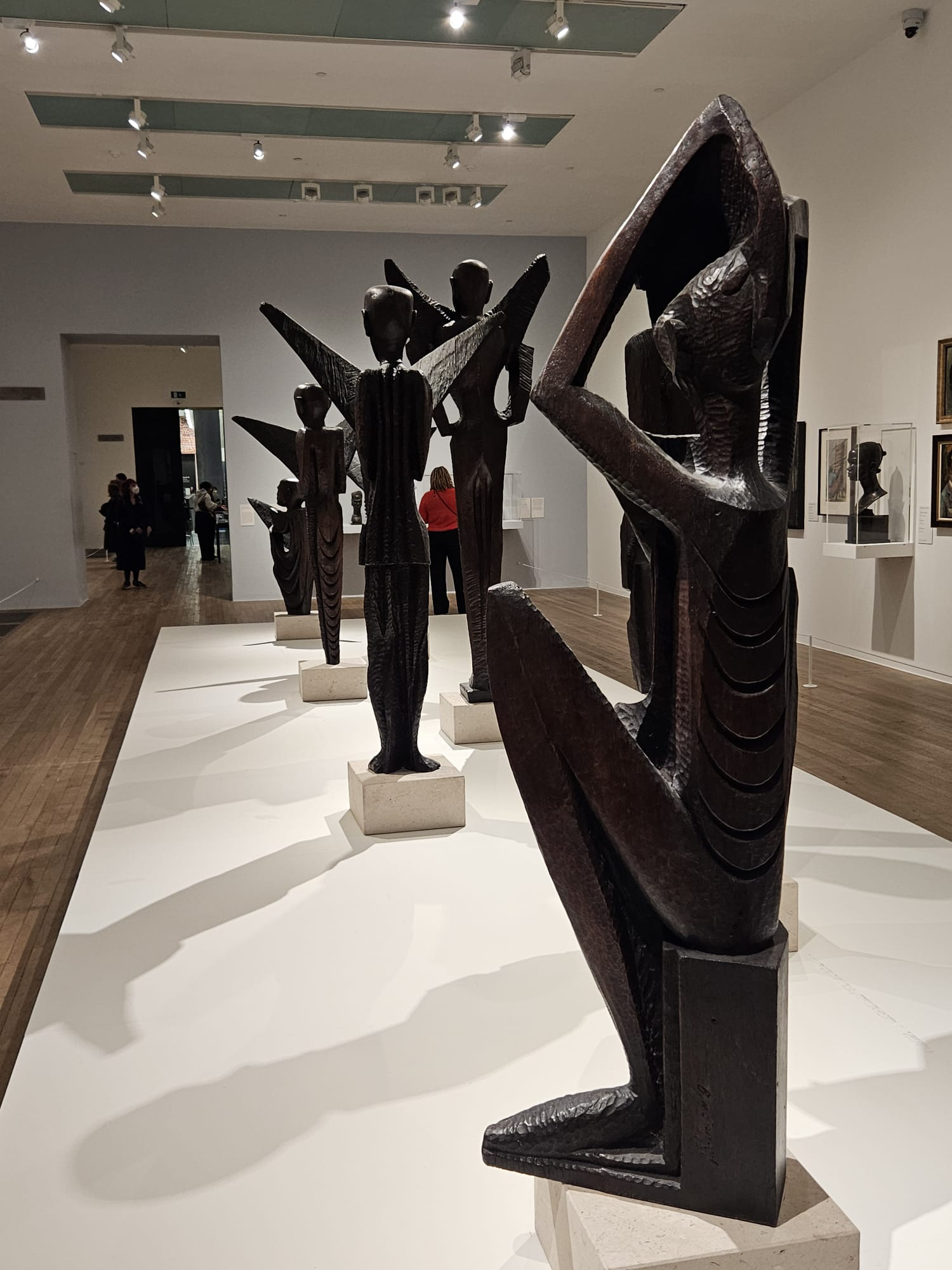
Enwonwu's seven sculptures exhibited at Tate Modern in 2026

The Nigerian artist Ben Enwonwu created a series of wooden sculptures for the London headquarters of the Daily Mirror in 1961. The sculptures subsequently disappeared from the newspaper's headquarters and were rediscovered and sold at auction in 2013.

Enwonwu had a prominent public reputation at the time of the Daily Mirror commission following the successful reception of his 1956 sculpture Anyanwu for the Nigerian National Museum and his 1957 statue of Queen Elizabeth II for the Nigerian House of Representatives. Enwonwu created seven sculptures in the Daily Mirror series. The sculptures were commissioned by the Daily Mirror to be installed in the forecourt of their new headquarters at Holborn Circus, into which they moved in 1961. The statues were featured on page 3 of the Daily Mirror on 6 September 1961 in an article titled "When News Takes Wings". The sculptures attracted crowds of visitors upon their installation; they were able to walk through the series of figures and so were able to become an interactive part of the sculptural scene. Enwonwu was featured in an interview on the BBC following the unveiling of the pieces.

Enwonwu's biographer, Sylvester Ogbechie, described the series as having been unveiled to "unanimous praise" upon their installation.

The pieces were rediscovered in 2013 having disappeared from the Daily Mirror's headquarters in the 1960s. The sculptures were found at a garage in the Bethnal Green Academy in East London. The pieces were put up for auction at Bonhams in New Bond Street in May 2013 and sold for £361,250 (including fees), establishing an auction record for Enwonwu.

== Form and interpretation ==
The seven sculptures are carved from African hardwood. Five are depicted standing. Each is holding a broadsheet newspaper, the newspapers in their hands have been likened to wings or hymn books. The seven figures are all depicted with individual expression and stances, the tapering of the figures from their base to their torso has been likened to Enwonwu's sculpture Anyanwu. The aesthetic stance of the figures is reminiscent of the wooden carving and sculptural traditions of the Igbo people.

Enwonwu stated in a 1961 interview with the Daily Mirror that he had tried in the creation of the piece to "... represent the wings of the Daily Mirror, flying news all over the world ... The group forms a sort of chorus. It is almost a religious group. All art, I believe, has a religious feeling – a belief in humanity".
