= Anyanwu (sculpture) =

Statue in Lagos, Nigeria

Anyanwu (English: The Awakening) is a bronze sculpture created by the Nigerian artist Ben Enwonwu between 1954 and 1955. It is a representation of the Igbo mythological figure and earth goddess Ani. It was created to mark the opening of the Nigerian National Museum in Lagos in 1956 and is still on display outside the museum. A life size version of the piece was presented to the United Nations by Nigeria in 1966 and is displayed in the Headquarters of the United Nations in New York City. Several subsequent smaller editions of the piece have since been created.

== Form and interpretation ==
The sculpture is a representation of the female Igbo mythological figure and earth goddess Ani. The piece was perceived by critic Ayodeji Rotinwa writing in the Art Newspaper as emblematic of the sculptural traditions of the Igbo people and of the art of Benin. The piece references the saluting of the rising sun, in veneration of the supreme Igbo deity Chukwu. Ani rises out of the ground to salute the Sun and arches toward the sky. She wears a headdress and jewellery made of coral, the traditional regalia of the Edo people. Her head is modelled after an Edo portrait sculpture of a Queen Mother. She is adorned with matching hoops bracelets on her wrists.

Enwonwu claimed that his vision for the piece came to him in a dream, describing it as a "supple graceful female form arising out of the sun in a brilliant shower of light...she loomed towards him in a wide curvilinear arch...the classic Ethiopianized features of the face and the decorative horizontal slats of the lower torso that receded into the horizon, tapering off to a point...". His biographer Sylvester Ogbechie has perceived parallels between Anyanwu and the central figure in a 1946 painting by Enwonwu from his series Song of the City. Ogbechie believes that Enwonwu appropriated the visual form of Anyanwu from the 1921 work Ethiopia Awakening by the American sculptor Meta Vaux Warrick Fuller. Enwonwu rejected comparisons between the slender form of Anyanwu and the sculptures of Alberto Giacometti, claiming that Giacometti and other European modernists had themselves appropriated the aesthetic norms of African art.

The critic Ayodeji Rotinwa has described the piece as "lithe and seemingly in movement" and manifesting the Négritude movement and the notion of motherhood in relation to the creation of Nigeria as an independent nation. Oliver Enwonwu, the artist's son, has described the piece as "[defining] the aspirations of the African people" and that it was "...still very relevant when it comes to the advancement of black people" in contemporary racial discourse.

The sculpture is the symbol of The Ben Enwonwu Foundation, established to promote Enwonwu's work and legacy. The foundation describes the piece as "one of Ben Enwonwu's greatest works that best illustrates his pioneering contributions to modern art in Nigeria and Africa through the invention of a new visual language that engaged nationalist and Pan-Africanist ideals" and that "...the sculpture's power derives from [Enwonwu's] successful fusion of indigenous aesthetic traditions drawn from his Edo-Onitsha heritage with Western techniques and modes of representation".

The United Nations describes the sculpture as "symbolic of the rising sun of a new nation" and that it "symbolizes the sun's various aspects - the light of the day, dawn, rebirth, a new day, hope and awakening" and that the woman depicted is wearing the regalia of the Kingdom of Benin.

== History ==
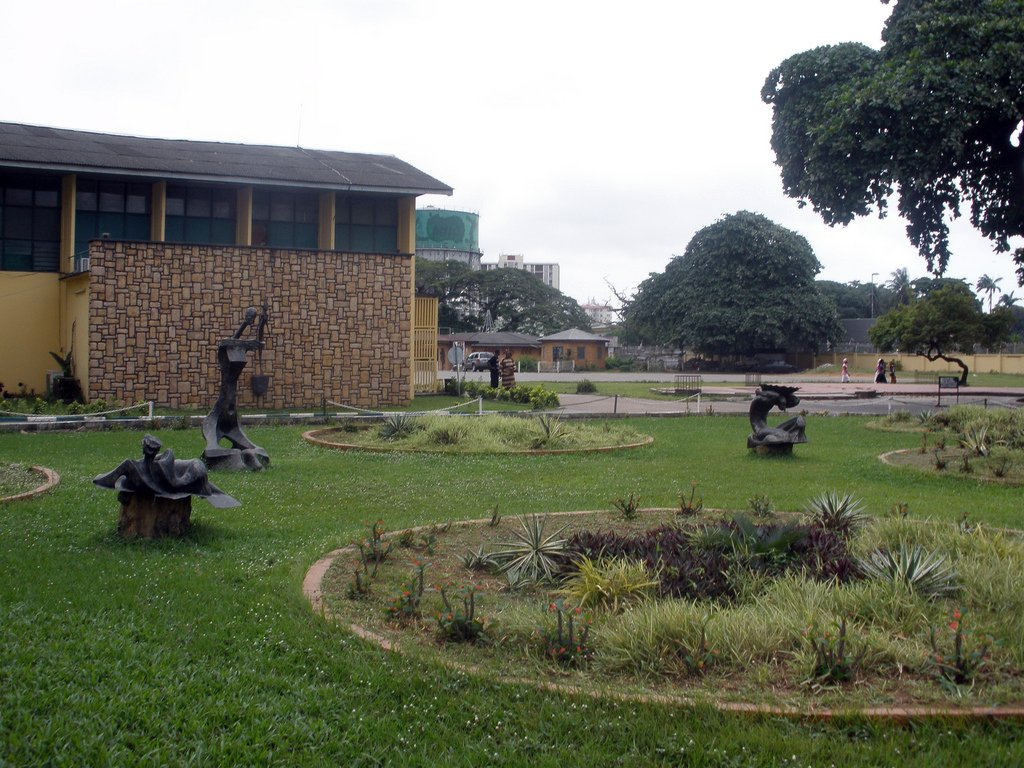
The Nigerian National Museum in 2009

The sculpture was originally created between 1954 and 1955 as a commission from the government of Nigeria to mark the establishment of the Nigerian National Museum in Lagos. The original version is still in situ, displayed outside the museum.

Enwonwu stated that his aim in creating Anyanwu was to "...to symbolise our rising nation", feeling that he had:

... Tried to combine material, crafts and traditions, to express a conception that is based on womanhood – woman, the mother and nourisher of man. In our rising nation, I see the forces embodied in womanhood; the beginning, and then, the development and flowering into the fullest stature of a nation – a people! This sculpture is spiritual in conception, rhythmical in movement and three dimensional in its architectural setting – these qualities are characteristic of the sculptures of my ancestors.

=== 1956 version ===
A second full size version of Anyanwu was cast in 1956 by Enwonwu in the London studio of the British sculptor William Reid Dick. Enwonwu had created his statue of Queen Elizabeth II in the same studio that same year. It was subsequently bought from Enwonwu himself by a friend in 1970, and had remained part of their private collection until its 2017 auction by Bonhams in February 2017 for £353,000.

=== 1966 version ===
A third full size version of Anyanwu was presented to the United Nations in a formal ceremony on October 5, 1966. It is part of the United Nations Art Collection. It was presented by the permanent representative of Nigeria to the United Nations, Chief Simeon Adebo, to the Secretary-General of the United Nations, U Thant shortly after the sixth anniversary of the establishment of the Federation of Nigeria and the end of British colonial rule. It is 6 feet, 10 inches in height and stands on a marble base. The sculpture is located in the Conference Building between the Security Council and Trusteeship Council.

=== Smaller editions ===
At least four subsequent smaller editions of the sculpture have been produced, typically with bronze or gold patination. Prices have increased substantially in the 21st century, a 2005 sale at Christie's of a 1975 bronze edition of Anyanwu sold for £360, and in 2012 an edition was sold at Arthouse Contemporary in Nigeria for £110,000 (with fees), establishing a record for the most expensive work of art sold at auction in Nigeria. An edition of Anyanwu sold for £237,000 (with auction fees) in March 2021 at Bonhams in London.

In a 2021 article for The Art Newspaper, Ayodeji Rotinwa wrote that "each time" an edition of Anyanwu appears on the art market "...it is attended by fanfare, only for it to go quietly into the possession of its new owner to be hardly discussed again until the appearance of another example" and that the original sculpture at the National Museum in Lagos "lies on a lawn badly in need of manicuring and is visited infrequently by disinterested [sic] children on school trips". Rotinwa notes that none of the smaller editions of the piece have been acquired by Nigerian public museums.

The President of Nigeria, Shehu Shagari, presented a small edition of Anyanwu to Elizabeth II and Prince Philip, Duke of Edinburgh, on the occasion of his state visit to the United Kingdom in 1981. It is part of the Royal Collection of the British royal family.

The smaller later editions of Anyanwu were cast at the Burleighfield foundry in High Wycombe, Buckinghamshire, England.
