= Omenka Gallery =

- Location within Lagos
- Established: 2003
- Location: 24, Ikoyi Crescent, 00176-0000 Ikoyi, Lagos
- Coordinates: 6.463779°N 3.434243°E
- Type: Art Gallery
- Director: Oliver Enwonwu

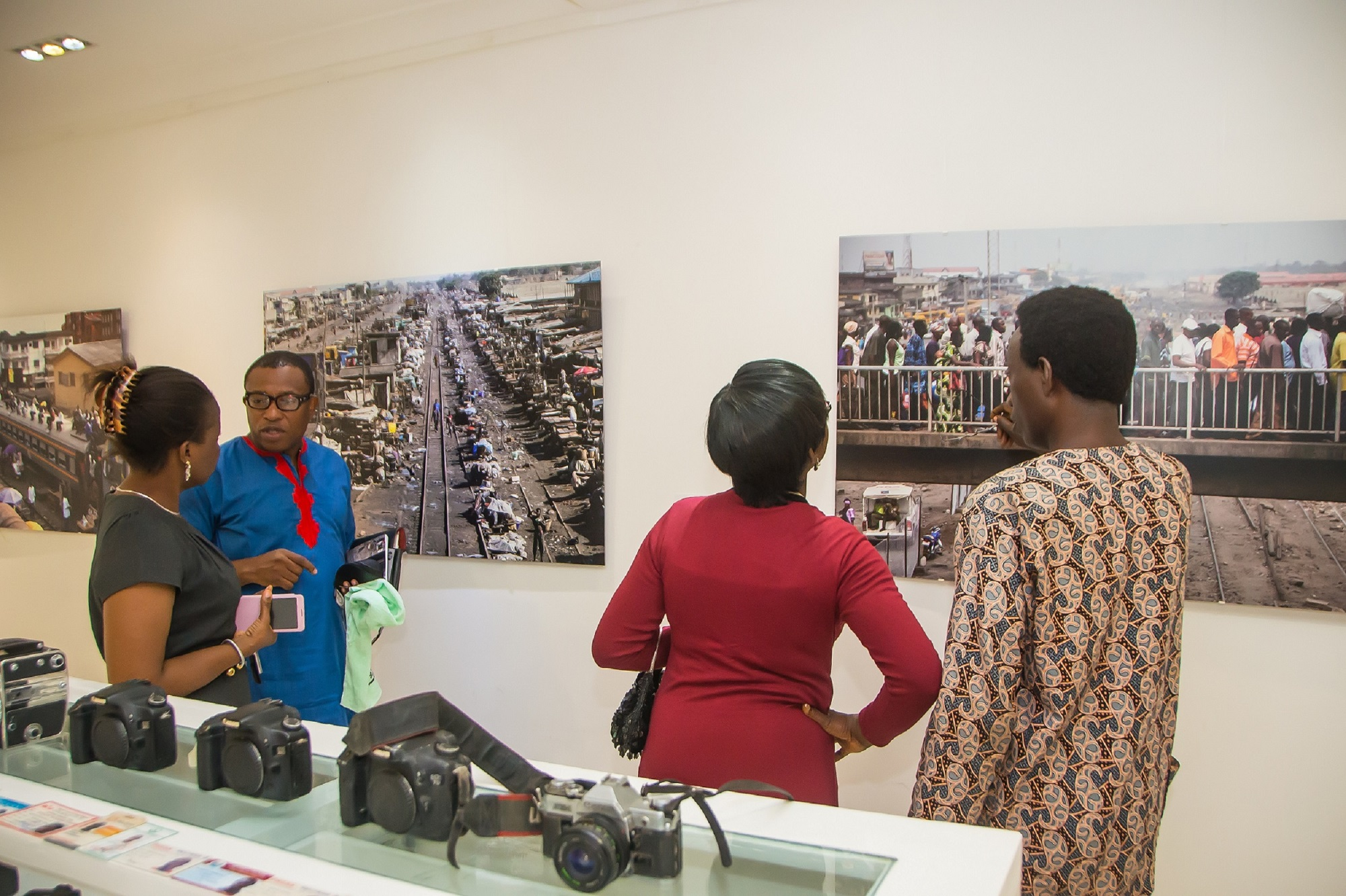

Omenka Gallery is a Nigerian contemporary art gallery, which represents Nigerian and international artists at its exhibition space in Lagos.

== History ==
Omenka Gallery was founded in Lagos in 2003 by Nigerian artist, curator and art administrator Oliver Enwonwu. Enwonwu's father, Ben Enwonwu, (1917-1994) was one of Nigeria's leading, 20th-century, modernist artists.

== Exhibitions ==
Since 2003, Omenka Gallery's programme of solo and group exhibitions has introduced new work by established and emerging Nigerian and international artists. Exhibitions, like the 2009 show, A perspective on contemporary Nigerian photography, focused public attention on developing trends in the Nigerian artworld by featuring new talents, like George Osodi (b.1974), alongside renowned masters such as J.D. ‘Okhai Ojeikere (1930-2014). Omenka gallery also hosted 'Insanity' the first Hyperrealism group exhibition in Nigeria which featured hyperrealists like Arinze Stanley, Ken Nwadiogbu and Ayo Filade. In the following decade, the gallery's programme developed its international profile, with exhibitions such as Having Travelled Far, which showcased a group of established, Europe-based artists of African heritage: Godfried Donkor (b.1964), Owusu-Ankomah (b. 1956), Manuela Sambo (b. 1964), EL Loko (b. 1950), and Ransome Stanley (b. 1953). The gallery has also participated in international art fairs, including Art15 in London, Art Dubai in the United Arab Emirates , and The Armory Show in New York.

== List of represented artists ==
- Abass Kelani (b. 1979)
- Cedric Nunn (b. 1957)
- Dominique Zinkpè (b. 1969)
- Duke Asidere (b. 1961)
- Ebenezer Akinola (b. 1968)
- Gary Stephens (b. 1952)
- Ima Mfon (b. 1989)
- Joel Mpah Dooh (b. 1956)
- Kimathi Donkor (b. 1965)
- Nathalie Mba Bikoro (b. 1985)
- Nnenna Okore (b. 1975)
- Olufemi Oyewole (b. 1986)
- Wallace Ejoh (b. 1966)
