= Enwonwu (crater) =

Crater on Mercury

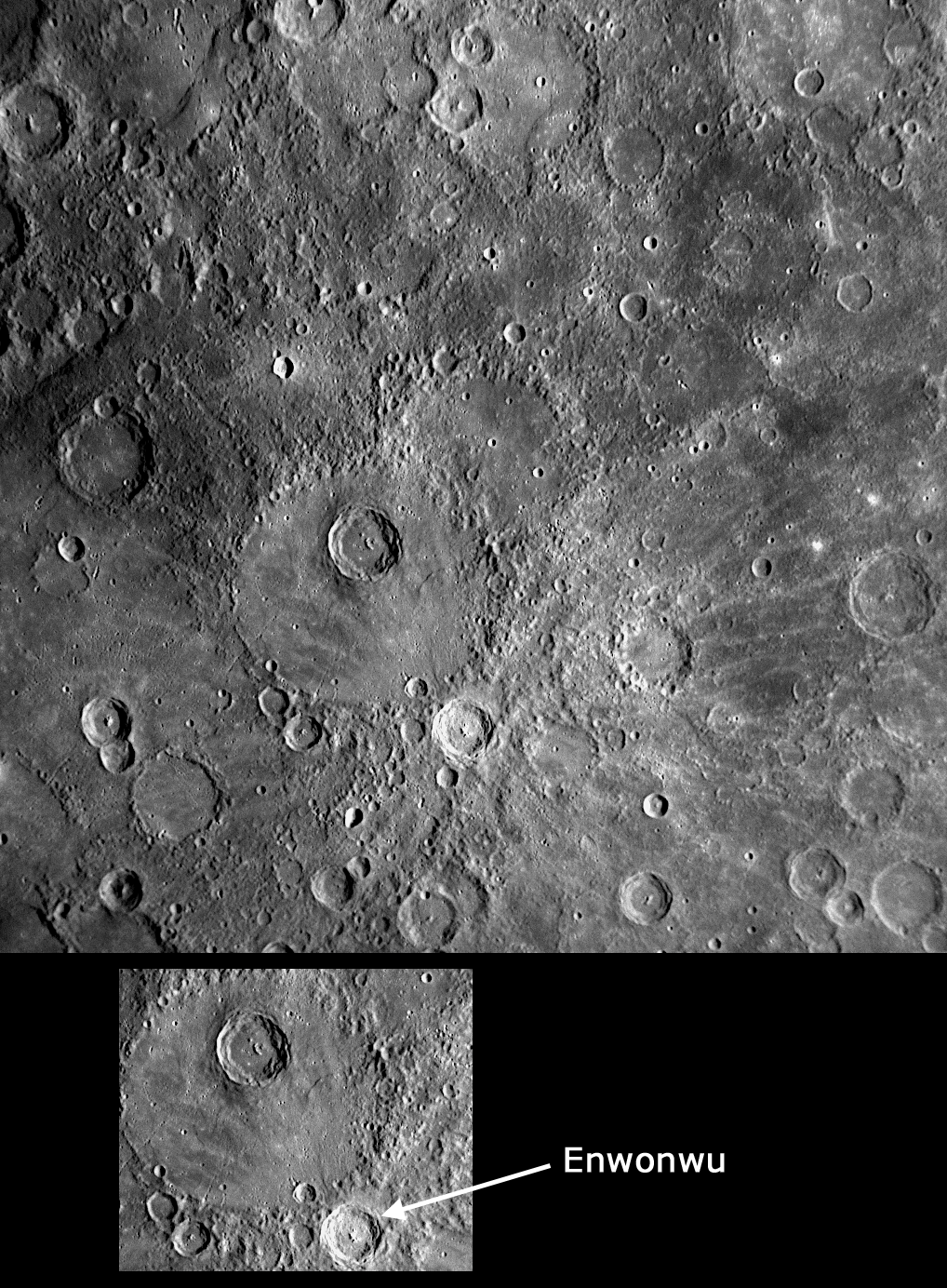
- MESSENGER image
- Feature type: Impact crater
- Location: Eminescu quadrangle, Mercury
- Coordinates: 9.9°S 238.4°W
- Diameter: 38 km (24 mi)
- Eponym: Ben Enwonwu

Enwonwu is an impact crater on the planet Mercury. It is named in honor of Ben Enwonwu, the modernist Nigerian sculptor and painter. The crater displays a central peak and a set of bright rays emanating from the crater rim. The rays cross the surrounding surface and neighboring craters, indicating that Enwonwu crater was formed comparatively recently in Mercury's history. The brightness of the rays also suggests relative youth, as over time rays darken and disappear on Mercury's surface.

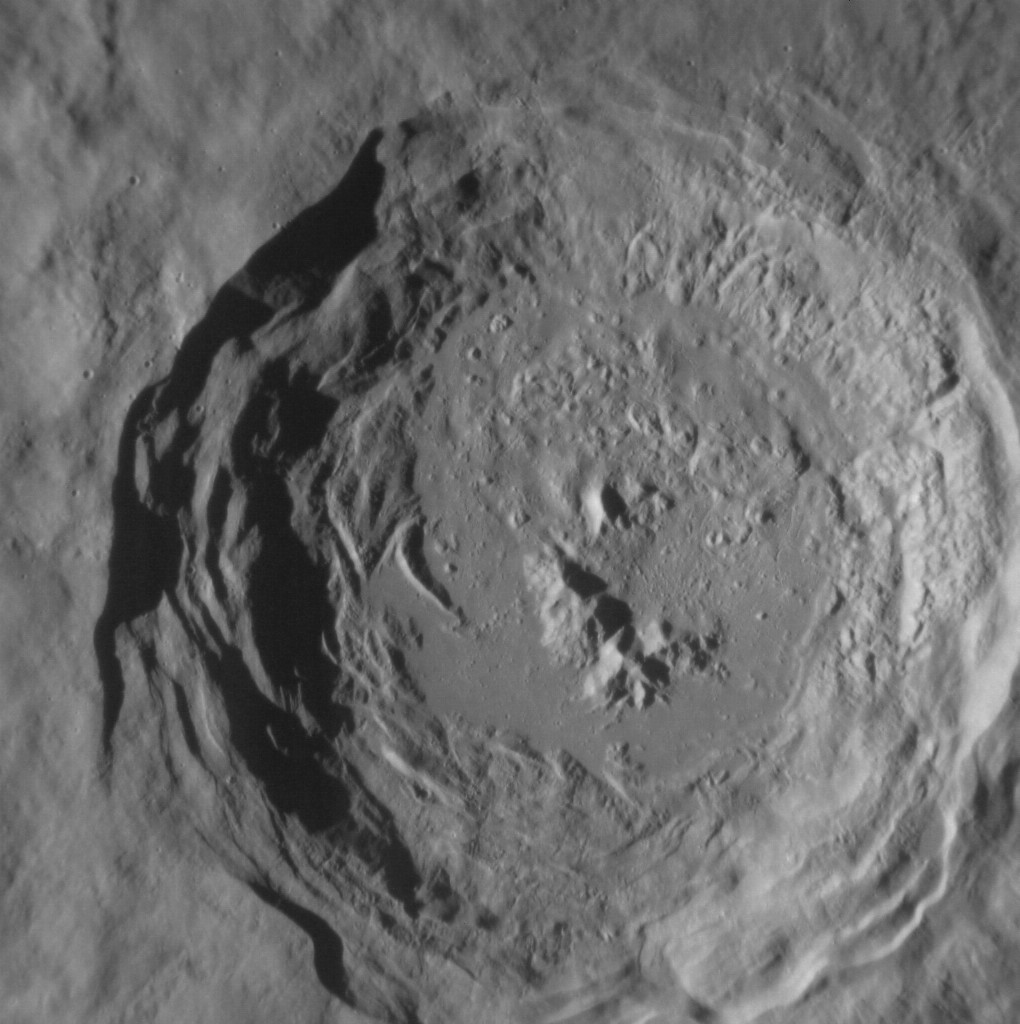
MESSENGER NAC image

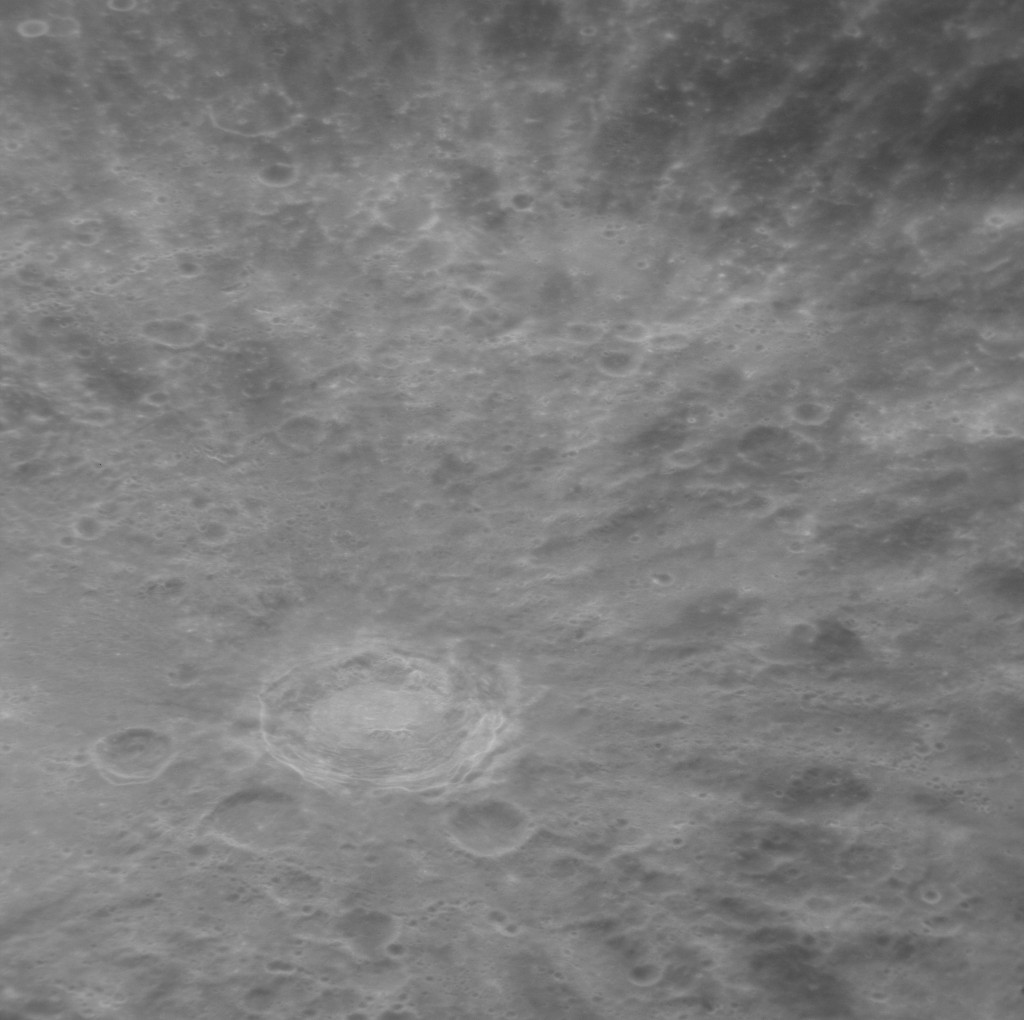
Oblique view with north at left

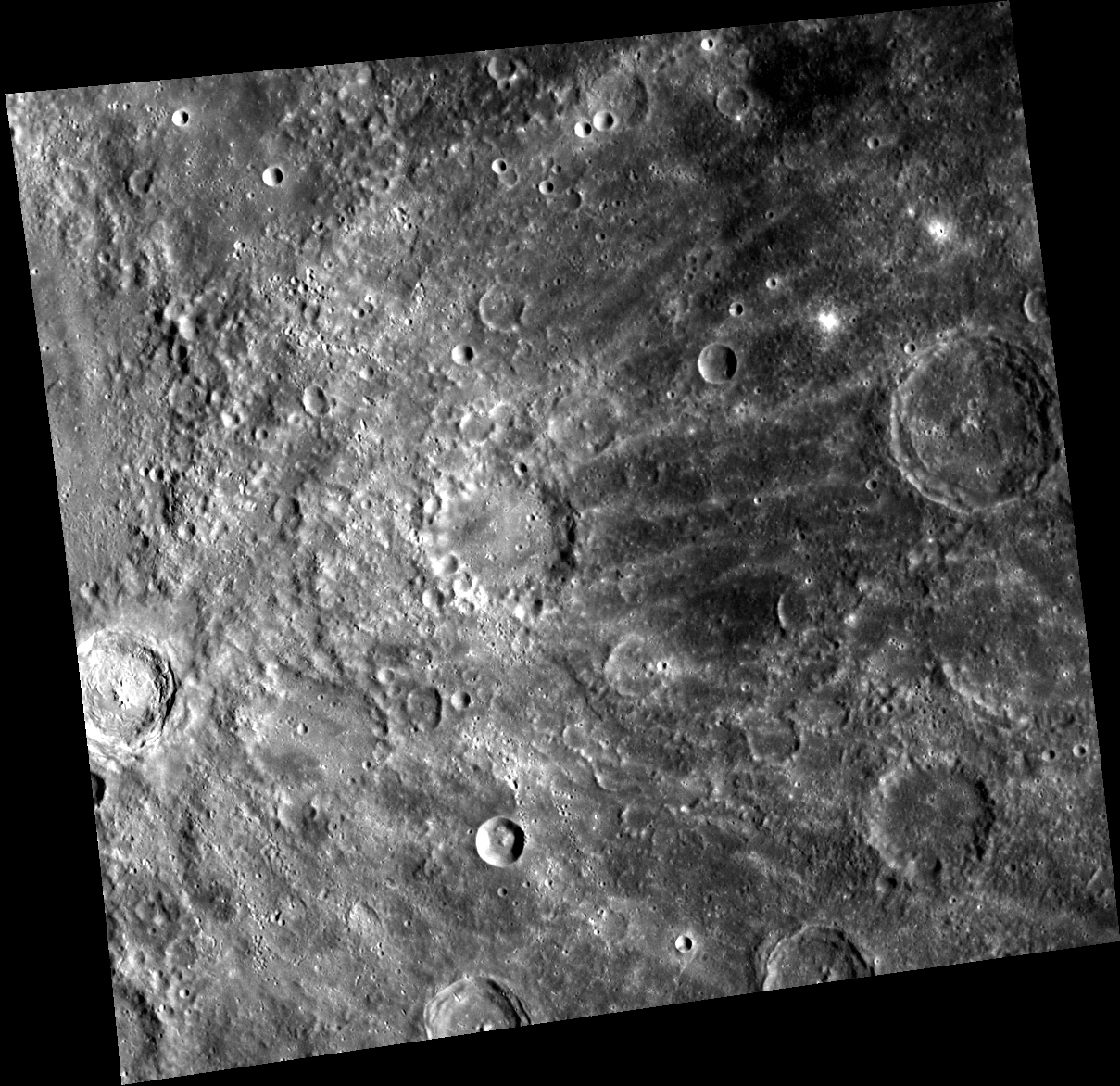
Enwonwu crater rays
