= Ken Nwadiogbu =

Nigerian multidisciplinary artist

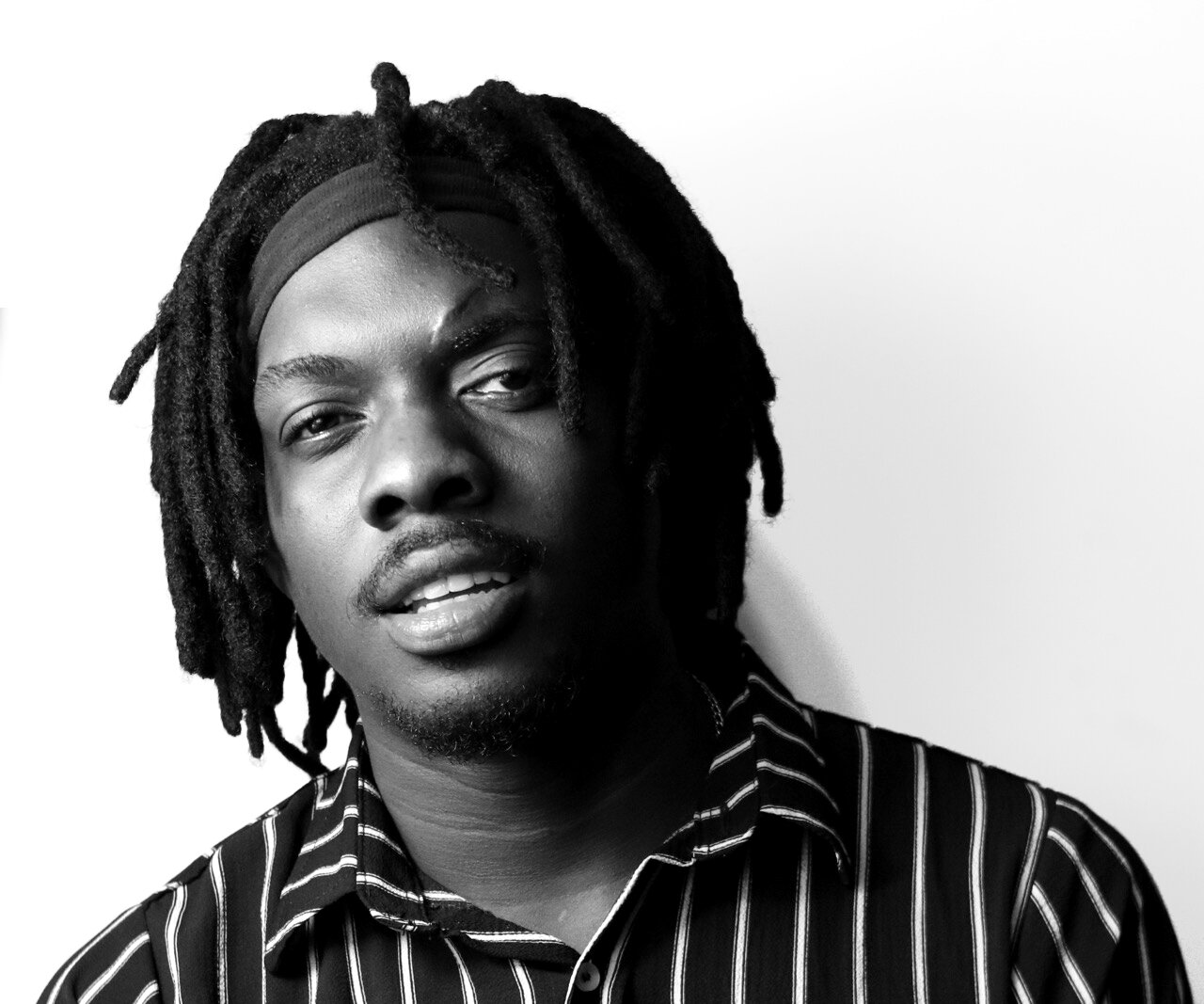
- Born: Kenechukwu Emmanuel Nwadiogbu; 1994 (age 31–32); Lagos, Nigeria
- Education: University of Lagos; Royal College of Art
- Occupation: Multidisciplinary artist
- Notable work: "Journey Mercies"; "The Migrant"; "Packages in Brown Skin"; "Fragments of Reality"
- Style: Contemporealism; Hyperrealism
- Movement: Contemporary art
- Awards: The Future Awards Africa (2019); Logitech Diversity Scholarship, RCA (2023); RBA Rising Star Award (2025); Young Generation Art Award (2026)
- Website: www.kennwadiogbu.com

Ken Nwadiogbu (born Kenechukwu Emmanuel Nwadiogbu, 1994) is a Nigerian-born, London-based multidisciplinary artist working across painting, sculpture, installation, and video art. Trained initially as a civil engineer at the University of Lagos, he transitioned fully into fine art, first building a reputation through hyperrealistic charcoal portraiture before expanding into a wider conceptual practice. He coined the term "contemporealism" to describe his view that hyperrealism alone cannot capture the full depth of lived experience — that an image of a moment is not the moment itself. By merging realism with other forms of contemporary art, contemporealism seeks to represent not just the appearance of an experience but its emotion, mood, and feeling.

A graduate of the Royal College of Art (MA Painting, 2023), where his studies were supported by the Logitech Diversity Scholarship in Art and Design, and a holder of the UK Global Talent Visa (Exceptional Talent), Nwadiogbu has exhibited widely across Europe, North America, Africa, and Asia. His work has been shown at institutions including the Royal Academy of Arts, Somerset House, and the Saatchi Gallery in London, as well as the Museum of Contemporary African Diasporan Art in New York, and has featured at international art fairs including ART SG in Singapore, the 1-54 Contemporary African Art Fair, SCOPE Miami Beach, and Prizm Art Fair.

In 2019, Nwadiogbu received the Future Awards Africa Prize for Art, one of the most prominent recognitions in the Nigerian creative industries. The same year, he was named among the "Outstanding Personalities of 2019" by Guardian Life. In 2025, he was awarded the Royal Society of British Artists Rising Star Award in recognition of his growing profile within the British art world. In February 2026, he was named the winner of the Young Generation Art Award, an international prize established by Degussa in partnership with the German art magazine Monopol, having been selected by a jury that included Yilmaz Dziewior, Director of Museum Ludwig in Cologne.

== Early life and education ==
Kenechukwu Nwadiogbu was born in 1994 in Lagos, Nigeria. He grew up in a family that placed strong emphasis on professional careers, with expectations that its children would pursue paths in law, medicine, or engineering. Despite this, he discovered drawing during his time at university and began developing his skills independently, without formal art training.

Nwadiogbu enrolled at the University of Lagos, where he studied Civil and Environmental Engineering. As his skill in drawing developed, encouragement from friends and peers deepened his commitment to art. After completing his engineering degree, he committed fully to fine art.

He was subsequently accepted onto the MA Painting programme at the Royal College of Art, moving to London in 2022. His studies were supported by the Logitech Diversity Scholarship in Art and Design Award, a full-fees scholarship. He graduated with an MA in Painting in 2023. During his studies, he visited the studio of British abstract painter Frank Bowling through the RCA BLK community, an experience he has described as pivotal in shaping his subsequent engagement with abstraction.

== Style of art ==
Nwadiogbu's practice is rooted in the relationship between image and experience. Working primarily in oil and acrylic on canvas, he builds his compositions by first pouring and dripping paint onto the surface, responding to colour, movement, and the psychological atmosphere of the studio, before painting figures on top in precise, heightened detail. The result places meticulous figuration against gestural abstract grounds, a tension he has described as representing the spiritual dimension of experience - the feeling that remains after a moment has passed.

His use of colour is deliberate and conceptually driven. A recurring body of work renders figures in vivid yellow, a chromatic choice rooted in the question: "What if Black were the brightest thing in the room?" The palette challenges conventional assumptions about visibility and race, honouring Black subjects by placing them at the luminous centre of the composition. Elsewhere, warm shades of orange and yellow evoke the aesthetic of thermographic cameras, reinforcing his view that memory survives as energy long after the visual experience has faded.

Nwadiogbu has also extended his material practice to include Akwete cloth, a traditional handwoven fabric from south-eastern Nigeria. He paints on the reverse side of the fabric, treating its existing geometric designs as artworks in their own right and creating what he describes as double artworks - a gesture that connects his Nigerian heritage with his London-based fine art practice.

== Notable works ==
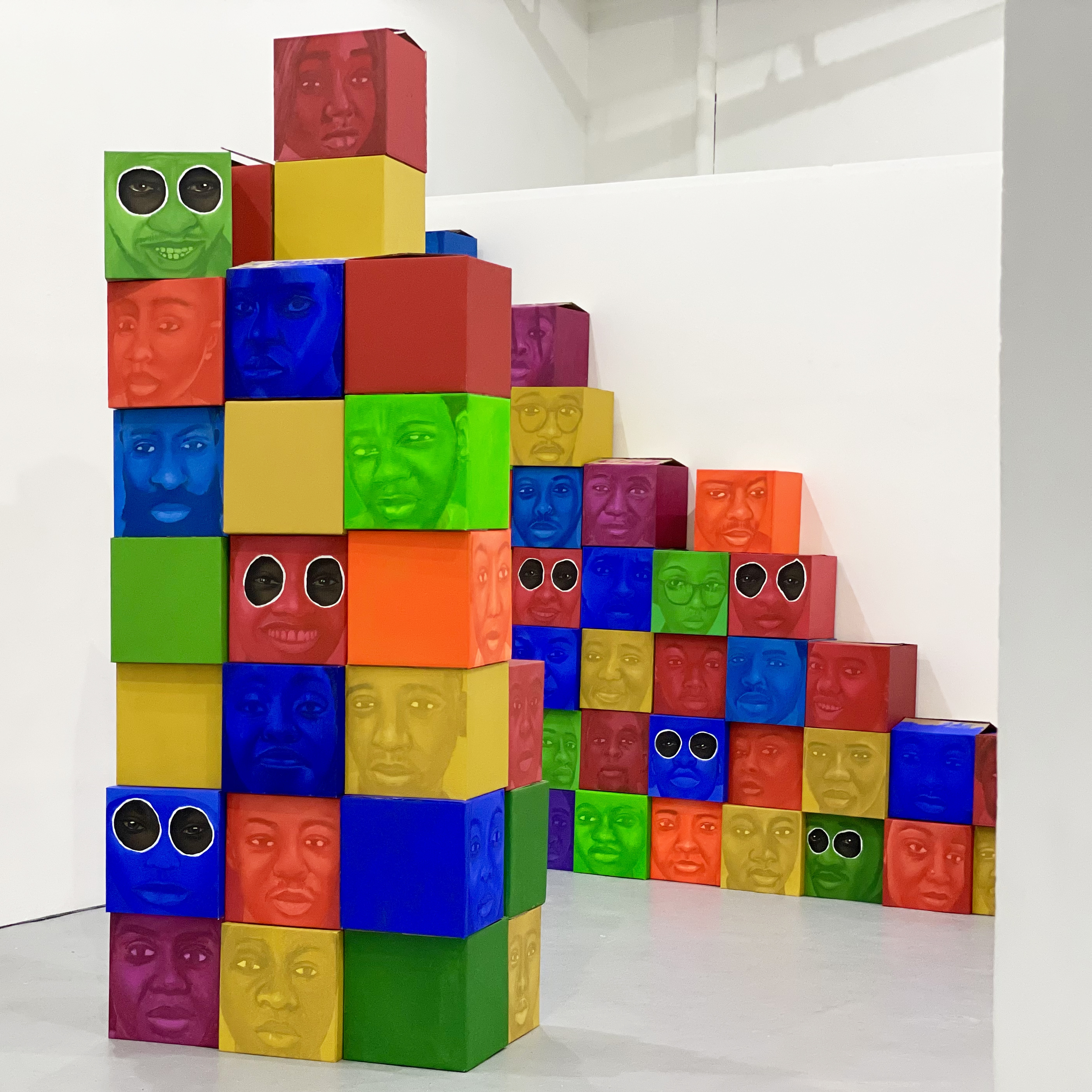

=== Journey Mercies (2021) ===
Journey Mercies was first exhibited as a solo show at Bomb Factory Art Foundation, London, in 2021. The installation used painted cardboard boxes as metaphors for Black migrant bodies, drawing on the historical resonance of bodies transported across oceans while interrogating the dehumanising logics of contemporary migration politics. The boxes were painted in colours referencing traditional African woven fabrics, commenting on the cultural richness carried by those in motion.

The title references a Nigerian custom of prayers said on behalf of those about to undertake a long journey - a phrase that carries both trepidation and hope. The work was later presented as part of A Different Perspective at Retro Africa Gallery, Abuja, in 2022, where it was described as combining dramatic staging with collective play-out in its interrogation of migration politics.

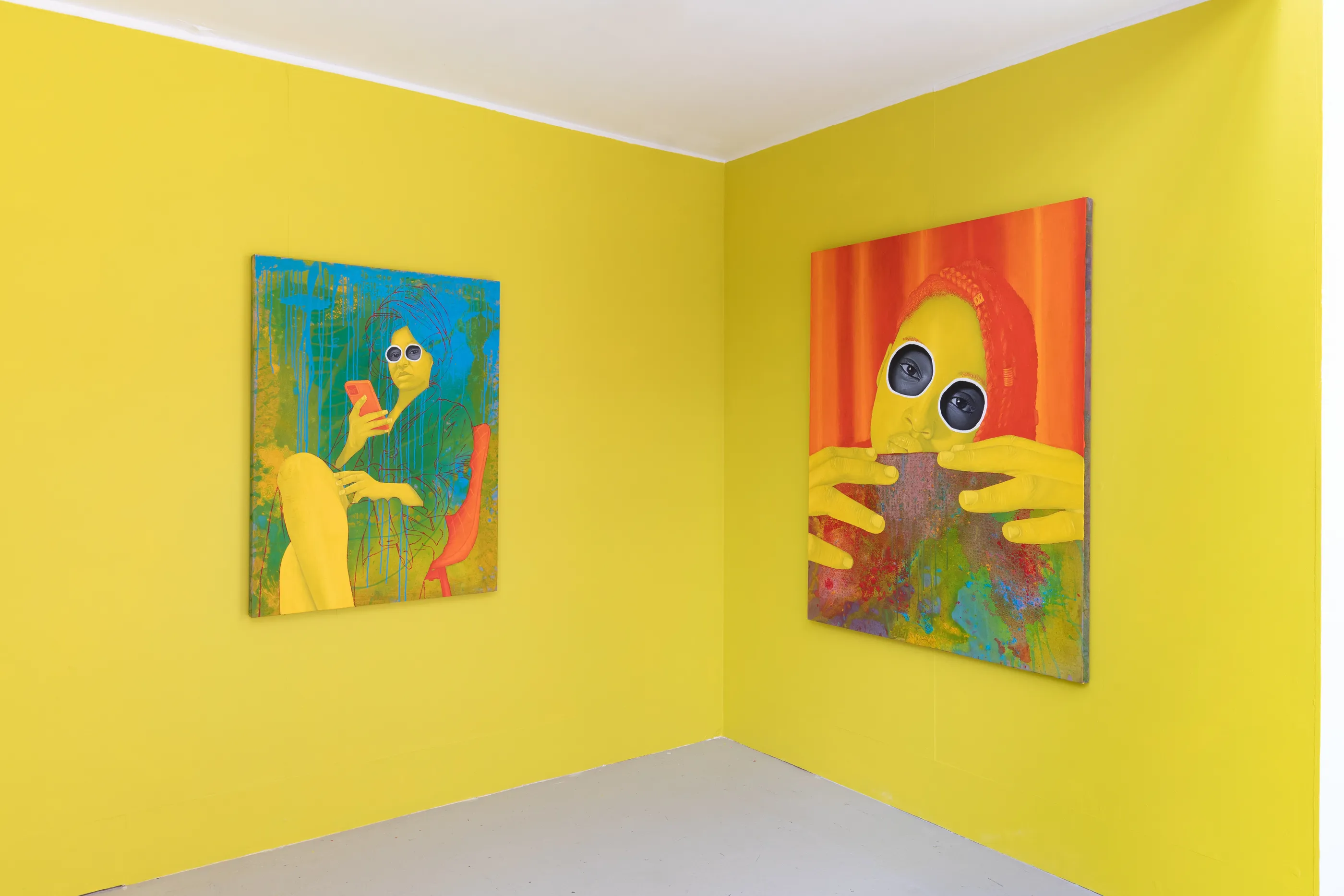
Ken's paintings at Kristin Hjellegjerde Gallery, London bridge

=== Fragments of Reality (2023) ===
Fragments of Reality was Nwadiogbu's first solo exhibition at Kristin Hjellegjerde Gallery, London Bridge, opening on 7 October 2023 during Frieze Week and running until 25 November 2023. Curated by Dolly Kola-Balogun in collaboration with Retro Africa, the exhibition drew from photographs the artist had taken in the United Kingdom - portraits of friends, family, and members of the Black immigrant community - rendered in a blazing palette of red, orange, and yellow against textured abstract grounds. The show was listed among the best London art exhibitions of the 2023 autumn season by Forbes.

== Community work ==
In 2016, Nwadiogbu co-founded Artists Connect Africa, a pan-African initiative designed to build professional networks and provide platforms for emerging African visual artists. The organisation facilitates collaborative projects and events that use creativity as a vehicle for dialogue, wellbeing, and social connection. The second edition of the initiative was held in March 2025 at Nordic Hotel, Lagos, bringing together visual artists from across Africa for exhibitions, panel discussions, and keynote addresses.

== Brand collaborations ==
In 2023, Nwadiogbu collaborated with heritage fashion brand GANT as one of three artists invited to reinterpret the brand's iconic Varsity Jacket for a limited-edition capsule collection titled Blank Canvas. His design fused elements of his Nigerian heritage with his contemporealism aesthetic, using a palette of orange, yellow, and green as a reference to royalty in Africa. One hundred per cent of the proceeds from his jacket were donated to a charity of the artist's choice.

In 2024, Nwadiogbu was selected by Absolut Vodka and Hypebae as one of five artists to participate in Absolut Warhol: The Other Half, an exhibition held at the Saatchi Gallery, London, in partnership with the Andy Warhol Foundation for the Visual Arts. The programme invited artists to create original works inspired by Andy Warhol's 1985 Absolut Warhol painting. Nwadiogbu described the experience as "a major win", noting the opportunity to tell his story on the same platform as artists including Warhol, Damien Hirst, and Keith Haring.

Nwadiogbu has also collaborated with Martell Cognac, for whom he created The Blue Experience, a digital film, in 2022. He created album artwork for Grammy Award-winning musician Burna Boy in the early stages of his career, a commission that helped build his creative profile prior to his transition into formal fine art training.

== Awards and recognition ==
- 2019: The Future Awards Africa Prize for Art (Visual/Applied).
- 2019: Named among the "Outstanding Personalities of 2019" by Guardian Life.
- 2023: Logitech Diversity Scholarship in Art and Design Award, Royal College of Art.
- 2024: Named among "8 Painters to Watch in 2024" by Artnet News.
- 2025: Royal Society of British Artists Rising Star Award.
- 2026: Young Generation Art Award (Monopol / Degussa), Berlin

== Exhibitions ==
=== Solo exhibitions ===
- 2019: CONTEMPOREALISM, Brick Lane Gallery, London.
- 2021: Journey Mercies, Bomb Factory Art Foundation, London.
- 2021: UBUNTU, Thinkspace Projects, Los Angeles.
- 2022: A Different Perspective, Retro Africa Gallery, Abuja, Nigeria.
- 2023: Fragments of Reality, Kristin Hjellegjerde Gallery, London Bridge.
- 2024: I Belong Here, Kristin Hjellegjerde Gallery, Berlin.
- 2025: Yellow is the New Black, Kristin Hjellegjerde Gallery, London.

=== Group exhibitions ===
- 2016: Insanity, Omenka Gallery, Ikoyi, Lagos, Nigeria.
- 2017: It's Not Furniture, Omenka Gallery, Ikoyi, Lagos, Nigeria.
- 2018: Moniker Art Fair, Greenpoint Terminal Warehouse, Brooklyn, New York.
- 2018: Art X Lagos, Federal Palace, Lagos, Nigeria.
- 2019: LAX-SFO, Heron Arts, San Francisco, California.
- 2019: LAX-MSY, Red Truck Gallery, New Orleans, Louisiana.
- 2019: LAX-LHR, Osborn Street, London.
- 2019: Art X Lagos, Federal Palace, Lagos, Nigeria.
- 2020: Art of Diversity, Yinka Shonibare studio, London.
- 2020: 1-54 Contemporary African Art Fair, New York.
- 2020: The Cookout: Kinfolk and Other Intimacies, MoCADA, New York.
- 2020: Prizm International Art Fair (8th Edition), Miami.
- 2021: POW! WOW! The First Decade: From Hawai'i to the World, Bishop Museum, Honolulu.
- 2021: Ruth Borchard Self-Portrait Prize Exhibition, Coventry Cathedral, Coventry.
- 2021: Real Life Is Fragile, Thinkspace Projects, Los Angeles.
- 2021: 1-54 Contemporary African Art Fair, New York.
- 2022: Freedom Protesters, Thinkspace Projects, Los Angeles.
- 2022: UNITY, Volery Gallery, Dubai, UAE.
- 2022: Across the Pond, Espacio Gallery, London.
- 2022: The Migrant, SCOPE Art Fair, Miami Beach (curated by Roger Niyigena Karera).
- 2023: RA Summer Exhibition, Royal Academy of Arts, London.
- 2023: Portrait of a Top Boy (Netflix commission), Embankment Galleries, Somerset House, London.
- 2023: Lucid Borders, Art Exchange, University of Essex, London.
- 2023: We Are Enough, 193 Gallery, Paris, France.
- 2024: Journey Mercies: A Migration Symphony, ART SG, Focus section, Marina Bay Sands Convention Centre, Singapore.
