= Tutu (painting) =

Series of portrait paintings by Ben Enwonwu

Tutu is a series of three portraits painted by the Nigerian artist Ben Enwonwu of the Ifẹ princess Adetutu Ademiluyi ('Tutu') in 1973. The three paintings have been missing since 1975; the second version was rediscovered in 2017 in London and sold at auction in 2018 for over £1 million.

The portrait was painted in the wake of the Nigerian Civil War and was seen a symbol of reconciliation between the government and Biafran separatists. An image of the portrait was displayed at Enwonwu's funeral. Enwonwu painted three versions of the portrait; all were subsequently lost until the 2017 discovery.

Mark Brown, writing in The Guardian described the painting as "a national icon in Nigeria, with poster reproductions hanging on walls in homes all over the country".

The subject of the portrait, the Ife princess Adetutu Ademiluyi, was believed to still be alive at the time of the sale of the second portrait in 2018. The first version was stolen just before Enwonwu's death in 1994.

== Discovery ==
The location of any of the three paintings had not been known since 1975, when one of the portraits was exhibited at the Italian embassy in Lagos. The director of modern African art at the London auction house Bonhams, Giles Peppiatt, was regularly sent images of 'Tutu' paintings, none of which were authentic, and were prints of Enwonwu's original work. Peppiatt was approached by a family in north London in late 2017 to evaluate a painting which they claimed was by Enwonwu, and Peppiatt confirmed it as authentic, describing it as "...an enormous surprise. It is a picture, image-wise, that has been known to me for a long time, so it was a real lightbulb moment; I thought: 'Oh my god, this is extraordinary'". The painting had been bought by the father of the family and they were unaware of its value. The novelist Ben Okri described the portrait as "the most significant discovery in contemporary African art in over 50 years. It is the only authentic Tutu, the equivalent of some rare archaeological find. It is a cause for celebration, a potentially transforming moment in the world of art".

It was subsequently sold at auction at Bonhams in February 2018 for £1,205,000.
