= Oliver Enwonwu =

Nigerian artist, curator, art administrator, writer, and publisher

- Education: University of Lagos, University of Benin
- Occupations: Artist, author, curator, art administrator, publisher
- Organization(s): Omenka Gallery, Revilo
- Known for: Nigerian Curator, Founder of Omenka Magazine, Omenka Gallery
- Father: Ben Enwonwu

Oliver Enwonwu is a Nigerian artist, curator, art administrator, writer and publisher, who comes from a long line of artists; his grandfather was a reputable traditional sculptor, and his father, Ben Enwonwu (1917–1994), was a renowned Nigerian painter and sculptor. He is the founder and CEO of Revilo, a Lagos-based visual arts and cultural communications company, publishers of Omenka, Africa's first arts, business, and luxury lifestyle magazine; and past president of the Society of Nigerian Artists (SNA).

Oliver Enwonwu's work is centred on elevating Black culture to challenge racial injustice and systemic racism by celebrating the cultural, political, and socio-economic achievements of Africans through an examination of African spirituality, Black identity and migration, contemporary African politics, pan-Africanism, and the global Africa empowerment movement.

== Early life and education ==
Oliver was born in 1975 in Nigeria. He had his secondary school at King's College, Lagos. He obtained his first university degree in biochemistry from the University of Lagos. He holds master's degrees in applied geophysics and visual arts from the same university.

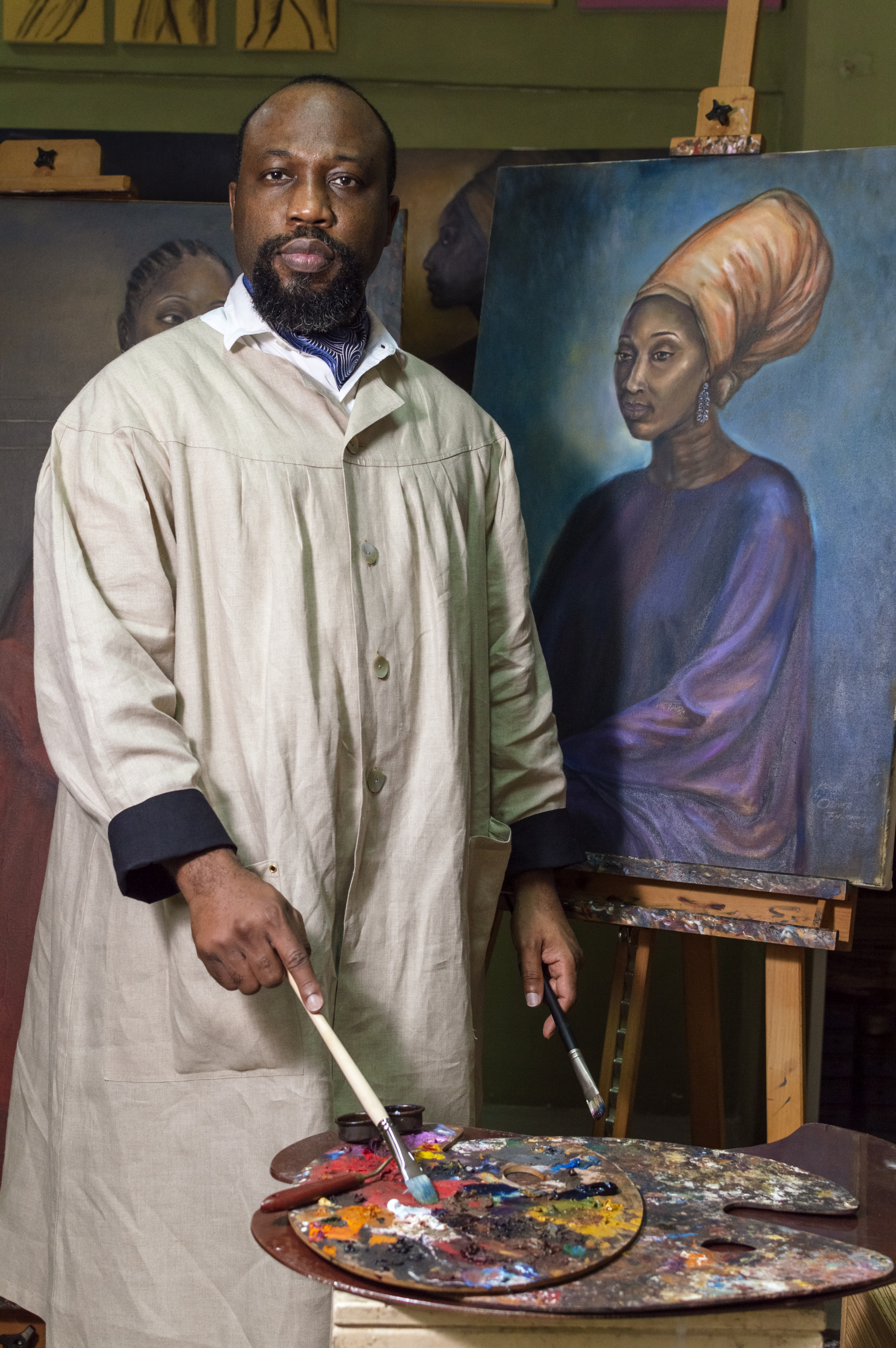
Oliver Enwonwu

== Career ==
Oliver learnt the fundamentals of drawing and painting from his father, Ben Enwonwu. However, the younger Enwonwu opted to study biochemistry in the university; having learned the fundamentals from his father, he perceived that visual art would not be as challenging as his desired course of study.

In 2003, he founded the Omenka Gallery, a Nigerian contemporary art gallery that represents Nigerian and international artists at its exhibition space in Lagos.

In 2009, Enwonwu became president of the Society of Nigerian Artists (SNA), which was established in 1963 as the professional body of visual artists in Nigeria, a position he held until July 2021.

In May 2024, he hosted an exhibition titled Oliver Enwonwu: A Continued Legacy, at the Mall galleries, London. The exhibition featured paintings, sculptures, and drawings by Oliver, as well as works by his father, Ben Enwonwu. The exhibition, which lasted from 21 May until 1 June, featured Oliver's works that deviated from his father's "personal aesthetic that increasingly focused on the temporal and spiritual forms engendered in the context of indigenous rituals." His unique approach was an interrogation of women, ideas of nationhood, the female body, gesture, dance, hair, and items of clothing as sophisticated strategies of resistance, evidenced by stylish, colourful attire and a strong sense of regality, autonomy, and self-assertiveness.

Oliver was also named the first beneficiary of King Charles's artist-in-residence programme for African, Caribbean, and Diaspora artists, hosted at Dumfries House, the King's Scottish Estate. The residency aims to give international artists the opportunity to gain inspiration from the Dumfries House headquarters, while also affording them access to The King's Foundation's vast range of specialist workshops, expertise, and skilled craftspeople.

In August 2025, Enwonwu was a participant in the Nigeria Art Society UK's exhibition The Carnivalesque: Body, Mind & Spirit.
