= Statue of Elizabeth II, Lagos =

Statue in Lagos, Nigeria, by Ben Enwonwu

Statue of Elizabeth II
- Ben Enwonwu with Queen Elizabeth II and his bronze statue of her
- Artist: Ben Enwonwu
- Year: 1956
- Medium: Bronze sculpture
- Subject: Elizabeth II
- Location: Lagos, Nigeria

A bronze sculpture of Elizabeth II by the Nigerian sculptor Ben Enwonwu was commissioned by the Queen on her visit to Nigeria in 1956, and she sat for Enwonwu in London in 1957. It was completed by Enwonwu in London and exhibited by him at the Royal Society of British Artists exhibition in London in November 1957. The over life-sized statue depicts the Queen seated with her hands in her lap.

== Background and creation ==
The proposal for the sculpture originated with Enwonwu who contacted Alan Lennox-Boyd, the British government's Secretary of State for the Colonies. Enwonwu intended the piece to mark Elizabeth's visit to Nigeria during January and February 1956. It was intended that the completed statue would sit in the Nigerian House of Representatives prior to the independence of the Federation of Nigeria and the end of British colonial rule in 1960. The Federation of Nigeria had been a protectorate under British rule since 1954. Following the announcement of the commission in November 1956 the West African Review wrote that it "sets the royal seal on the renown of West Africa’s most famous artist".

The initial sittings were held in Buckingham Palace in March 1957. A studio was created for Enwonwu at the palace; he would spend an hour sketching and modelling with clay in the studio on a daily basis. Enwonwu later worked in a studio belonging to the Sculptor in Ordinary for Scotland, William Reid Dick, in Maida Vale in west London due to the growing size of the sculpture. Elizabeth sat for Enwonwu on 12 occasions; eight sittings were held at the palace and four at Reid-Dick's Maida Vale studio.

Enwonwu created his initial preparatory sketches of the Queen in watercolours; showing her in frontal poses and capturing her various profiles. Enwonwu also created a bust of Elizabeth to use as a scale model to help develop her final pose and to aid with the depiction of her regalia. It was cast in bronze by Giulio Galicie in London; a second life size version was cast in epoxy resin and was the one displayed at the exhibition of the Royal Society of British Artists in London in November 1957.

Enwonwu's biographer, Sylvester Ogbechie, felt that he "reworked the Queen's physical features using forms derived from his experiments in sculpture" and created an "interesting hybrid that amalgamated the distinctive features" of the Queen with "the serene expression" of his Head of a Yoruba Girl sculpture. Ogbechie extensively analysed the sculpture in terms of the subversion of the white gaze, and colonial perceptions of black male sexual dominance.

== Reception ==
Upon its exhibition at the Royal Society of British Artists exhibition in 1957, The Times commented that the statue "...conveys the requisite sense of regal dignity which will probably not be fully effective until it is seen from a distance in the sort of public setting for which it was commissioned. In the comparative intimacy of a gallery however the boldly semi abstract treatment of the lower folds of the dress not only directs attention upwards, as designed, to the more conventional realism of the head but it underlines in this and other important, detailed passages of the figure a general feeling of constraint and lack of vitality". Enwonwu was interviewed by the BBC at the exhibition and a news report on him and the sculpture was broadcast on 11 November. The Queen attended the exhibition as its patron and was escorted around the exhibition by Enwonwu.

The sculpture was unveiled on 5 November 1959 before the start of the fifth session of the Nigerian House of Representatives in Lagos. The Governor-General of Nigeria, James Wilson Robertson sent a message to the Queen in which he stated that the statue "...will always be a reminder of the happy occasion just over three years ago when your Majesty and the Duke of Edinburgh honoured the House by your presence and by your Majesty's gracious speech". The Queen replied in a message in which she said that "I too shall long recall the memorable occasion of my visit to the House three years ago. I send my good wishes to all the members of the House as it enters upon another session and take this opportunity of expressing my confidence that the tradition of parliamentary democracy, which has been so quickly absorbed and developed by Nigerians, will be maintained when Nigeria becomes an independent member of the Commonwealth".

The Queen subsequently commissioned Enwonwu to create a bust of her eldest son, Prince Charles. Enwonwu gave her his small portrait bust of her.
