= Sylvester Ogbechie =

Nigerian-American art historian, artist, and curator

Sylvester Okwunodu Ogbechie is a Nigerian-American art historian, artist, and curator. He is Professor of History of Art and Architecture at the University of California, Santa Barbara. His research examines African and African Diaspora arts, modern and contemporary art, cultural informatics, and African cultural patrimony. Ogbechie founded the journal Critical Interventions: Journal of African Art History and Visual Culture, and organized the first conference in the United States to explore the Nigerian film industry in 2005. He is a 2022 Guggenheim Fellow in Fine Arts Research as well as a Fellow/Consortium Professor of the Getty Research Institute, senior fellow of the Smithsonian Institution, Fellow of the Rockefeller Foundation, and Fellow of the Institute of International Education. His publications include Ben Enwonwu: The Making of an African Modernist (2008) and Making History: African Collectors and the Canon of African Art Collection (2011).

== Early life and education ==
Sylvester Okwunodu Ogbechie was born in Nigeria. He obtained his master's degree at the University of Nigeria. In the 1980s, the American-style university adopted a more conceptual approach to art education, expanding beyond the traditional art school curriculum. This program produced a generation of influential critics, curators, and artists, including Ogbechie. He obtained his Ph.D. from Northwestern University.

== Career ==
Ogbechie has contributed to and published extensively in various academic journals, including African Arts, Art Journal, and Nka: Journal of Contemporary African Art. He also founded and edited Critical Interventions: Journal of African Art History and Visual Culture, a peer-reviewed journal that explored African and African Diaspora art, cultural identities, and the politics of commodification in the global economy. The journal, which ceased publication in 2021, also examined African cultural patrimony, intellectual property rights, and the transmission of indigenous knowledge systems.

In June 2005, Ogbechie organized the First International Nollywood Convention and Symposium in Los Angeles, which "evaluated new media in contemporary African Visual Culture from the perspective of the internationally acclaimed Nigerian Video Film Industry." The following year, he established the Nollywood Foundation to advance the formal study of this phenomenon and organized annual international Nollywood conventions from 2005 to 2009. Ogbechie has stated that Nollywood is "the first global pan-African film medium to cut across social, cultural, economic and national boundaries" and asserts that the films played "a major role in the social and economic recovery of Liberia after its civil war".

In his 2011 book Making History: African Collectors and the Canon of African Art, which examines the Femi Akinsanya collection in Nigeria, Ogbechie highlighted the overlooked role of African collectors in the creation of art collections.

Ogbechie has received numerous fellowships, including the Daimler Fellowship from the American Academy in Berlin, a Fellowship and Consortium Professorship at the Getty Research Institute, and fellowships from the Rockefeller Foundation and the Institute for International Education. In 2016, he received a Smithsonian Institution Senior Fellowship Award to work on a book titled Rethinking African Art History: Indigenous Arts, Modernity, and Discourses of the Contemporary. The project examines the divide between pre-colonial African art and art shaped by colonial, postcolonial, urban, and global influences. In 2022, Ogbechie received a Guggenheim Foundation award for his book project, The Curator as Culture Broker: Representing Africa in Global Contemporary Art. The book employs historiographical, art historical, and social network analysis to explore how African artists and artworks are represented within the global discourse of contemporary art.

Ogbechie is a member of the College Art Association, and has served on the board of the African Studies Association, the Arts Council of the African Studies Association (where he served as president), and the American Association of University Professors.

Ogbechie is the founder and director of Aachron Knowledge Systems, which engages in art management and equity consulting.

Ogbechie has recounted the challenges he faced in obtaining a ten-day German visa to attend Documenta, one of the world's premier contemporary art exhibitions. "At the German [consulate] in Los Angeles, it took me three days to explain to the officials there why I, an art historian and professor in a major department of art history at a major American university, should be interested in attending the most important contemporary art exhibition on the planet." Addressing the barriers faced by African artists, he questioned: "what kind of exchange occurs when African artists and scholars are actively denied a chance to engage their counterparts in the West by being subjected to stringent applications requirements for a visa? What does this do to the production of knowledge about their spaces of practice?"

=== Views ===
Ogbechie has highlighted and critiqued recent trends that frame contemporary African arts primarily as diasporic, often neglecting artistic practices within the continent. He has pointed to Nollywood and underground movements as embodying the concept of art as performance in a modern context. He critiques the preference for Western-based African artists in exhibitions, which he believes marginalizes artists living and working on the continent. Ogbechie highlights how this trend prevents scholars from engaging with the complexities of African art in its local contexts. In his essay The Curator as Culture Broker, he critiques the tendency of Okwui Enwezor, a prominent curator of contemporary African art, to position Africa primarily within a diaspora context. He argues that this framing dislocates African visual culture, leading to a perception of Africa as "everywhere but nowhere," effectively rendering it a non-location within art discourse. He asserts that the diaspora cannot serve as a substitute for Africa, as its members possess distinct histories and experiences shaped by their specific circumstances.

Ogbechie criticizes art-historical narratives for refusing to acknowledge modern African art as coeval with European modernism, despite both emerging around the turn of the 20th century through similar acts of appropriation and transformation of traditional aesthetics. He contends that "the unequal power relationship engendered by Africa's colonization" has sidelined African modernity, framing it as a by-product of European colonization rather than an independent artistic movement.

== Awards and recognitions ==
Ogbechie received the Melville J. Herskovits Award for his book Ben Enwonwu: The Making of an African Modernist. This award is given annually to the best English-language scholarly work on Africa published and distributed in the United States in the preceding year.

In 2019, Ogbechie was awarded the Teshome H. Gabriel Distinguished Africanist Award from the African and African-American Studies Research Center at UC San Diego.

== Bibliography ==
=== As author ===
- Ogbechie, Sylvester Okwunodu (2008). Ben Enwonwu: The Making of an African Modernist. Rochester Studies in African History and the Diaspora. Vol. 37 (Illustrated ed.). University Rochester Press. ISBN 978-1580462358.
- Ogbechie, Sylvester Okwunodu (2012). Making History: African Collectors and the Canon of African Art (1st ed.). 5 Continents Editions. ISBN 978-8874395712.

=== As editor ===
- Offoedu-Okeke, Onyema; Ogbechie, Sylvester Okwunodu (2012). Artists of Nigeria. 5 Continents Editions. ISBN 9788874395477.
- Udondian, Victoria-Idongesit (2023). How Can I Be Nobody?. Hirmer Verlag. ISBN 9783777442570.

== Selected publications ==
- Ogbechie, Sylvester Okwunodu (1997). "Uzo Egonu: An African Artist in the West". Nka: Journal of Contemporary African Art (6–7): 62–65.
- Ogbechie, Sylvester Okwunodu (2000). "The Art of Ben Enwonwu: A Pan-Africanist Perspective". Ijele: Art eJournal of the African World. 1 (1): 1–15.
- Ogbechie, Sylvester Okwunodu (2002). "Aesthetics and Artistic Identity in Modern Nigerian Art". Nka: Journal of Contemporary African Art (16/17): 24–31. doi:10.1215/10757163-16-17-1-24.
- Ogbechie, Sylvester Okwunodu (2002). "Are We There Yet?". African Arts. 35 (1): 1, 4–7. doi:10.1162/afar.2002.35.1.1.
- Ogbechie, Sylvester Okwunodu (2005). "The Historical Life of Objects: African Art History and the Problem of Discursive Obsolescence". Critical Interventions (1): 4–20.
- Ogbechie, Sylvester Okwunodu (2005). "Ordering the Universe: Documenta XI and the Apotheosis of the Occidental Gaze". Art Journal. 64 (1). College Art Association: 80–89. doi:10.1080/00043249.2005.10791160.
- Ogbechie, Sylvester Okwunodu (2007). "Is African Art History?". Critical Interventions. 1 (1): 4–13. doi:10.1080/19301944.2007.10781312.
- Peffer, John; Ogbechie, Sylvester Okwunodu (2010). "History of Photography Special Issue on Africa". History of Photography. 34 (2). Taylor & Francis.
- Ogbechie, Sylvester Okwunodu (2010). "The Curator as Culture Broker: A Critique of the Curatorial Regime of Okwui Enwezor in Contemporary African Art". Art South Africa. 9 (1): 34–37.
- Ogbechie, Sylvester Okwunodu (2019). "Momentum Builds for the Restitution of African Art". Current History. 118 (808). University of California Press: 194–196. doi:10.1525/curh.2019.118.808.194.
- Ogbechie, Sylvester Okwunodu (2021). "African Cultural Heritage: Erasure, Restitution, and Digital Image Regimes". In Paquette, Catha; Kleinfelder, Karen; Miles, Christopher (eds.). In and Out of View: Art and the Dynamics of Circulation, Suppression and Censorship. New York: Bloomsbury Publishing. pp. 236–246.
- Ogbechie, Sylvester Okwunodu (2021). "Of Yoruba Orisha, Sacred Groves, and Modernist/Contemporary Gesamtkunstwerk: The Olorisa Project". In Ocherbauer, Eva Maria (ed.). OLORISA. Graz/Berlin/Lagos: FotoFactory.Lagos. pp. 43–49.
- Ogbechie, Sylvester Okwunodu (2021). "Ulli Beier, Cultural Brokerage and Cold War Parapolitics". In Franke, Anselm; Ghouse, Nida; Guevara, Paz; Majaca, Antonia (eds.). Parapolitics: Cultural Freedom and the Cold War. Berlin: Haus der Kulturen der Welt and Sternberg Press. pp. 541–555.
- Ogbechie, Sylvester Okwunodu (2022). "Review of The Brutish Museums: The Benin Bronzes, Colonial Violence and Cultural Restitution, by Dan Hicks". American Anthropologist. 124 (2). American Anthropological Association: 245–247.
- Ogbechie, Sylvester Okwunodu (2024). Costache, Irina D.; Kunny, Clare (eds.). The Global Contexts of Modern African Art: Negotiating Blackness, Modern Art and African Identities in Paris. New York: Routledge. pp. 204–216.
