= John Jurko II =

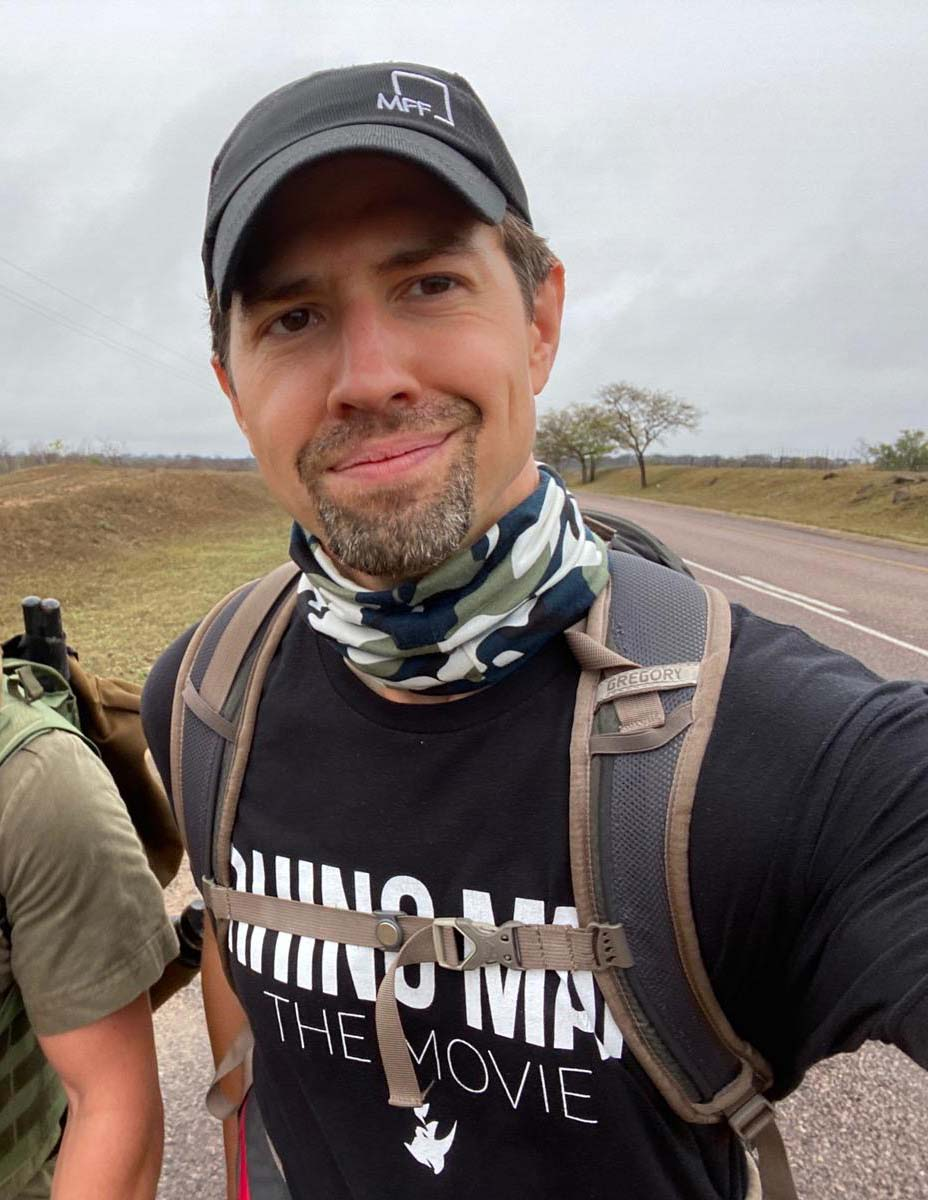
- Jurko in 2020
- Born: April 24, 1982 (age 44); Yankee Lake, Ohio, U.S.
- Education: Bowling Green State University (BA)
- Occupations: Filmmaker, podcaster
- Website: www.johnjurko.com

John Jurko II (born April 24, 1982) is an American filmmaker and podcaster, best known as the producer and director of the documentary Rhino Man, which focuses on South African rangers protecting rhinos.

== Early life and education ==
John Ambrose Jurko II was born on April 24, 1982, in Yankee Lake, Ohio. He received a B.A. in both Film Production and Philosophy from Bowling Green State University in Ohio.

== Career ==
=== Filmmaking ===
After college, Jurko began work on a documentary about his family’s role in the development of Yankee Lake, Ohio. The film was intended to explore the history of his great-grandfather, John Jurko (Ioan Jurka), a Romanian immigrant who ran a bootlegging operation during Prohibition and established a resort and ballroom that hosted big jazz bands. The documentary also planned to feature his grandfather, Paul Jurko, who founded the village of Yankee Lake and served as its first mayor at the age of 21.

Before completing the documentary, Jurko moved to Los Angeles in 2012, where he worked in the camera department of various independent films, including Bone Tomahawk, Stevie D, and Some Kind of Hate.

In 2018, Jurko joined the Atlanta-based production company Friendly Human as their production director. It was there that he met Matt Lindenberg, the Founder and Executive Director of the Global Conservation Corps. The two organizations were collaborating on the documentary Rhino Man, and Jurko eventually took on the role of lead producer and director.

On July 26th, 2022, as Rhino Man neared completion, Anton Mzimba, the lead ranger featured in the documentary and a friend of Jurko's, was murdered at his home in South Africa. This event led to Jurko’s introduction to United for Wildlife, an organization founded by Prince William of Wales, which combats illegal wildlife trade. Jurko, along with Lindenberg and others, was invited to the 2022 United for Wildlife Global Summit in London, where he met Prince William and spoke about Mzimba's death and the Rhino Man project.

The developing collaboration led to a world premiere at a private screening hosted by United for Wildlife, attended by Prince William of Wales and Duchess Sophie of Edinburgh. The event took place on June 13th, 2023 at the Cinema in the Battersea Power Station, London. Jurko introduced the film to an audience of 150 officials from finance, transportation, law enforcement, and NGOs involved in combating illegal wildlife trade.

=== Podcasting ===
From 2014 to 2016, Jurko hosted Odyssey & Muse, a long-form interview podcast focusing on creativity and adventure.

In 2022, as a way to promote Rhino Man, Jurko began producing and hosting The Rhino Man Podcast, which focuses on rhino conservation, the poaching crisis, the importance of rangers, and community engagement. His interviewees have included figures such as David Fein, former U.S. Attorney and Chair of the United for Wildlife Financial Taskforce, Olivia Swaak-Goldman, Executive Director of the Wildlife Justice Commission, and Chris Galliers, President of the International Ranger Federation.

Jurko has also appeared on podcasts such as National Park After Dark, Pull the Thread: The Wild Life, and Voices of Nature.

== Personal life ==
In 2014, Jurko embarked on a two-month unsupported solo cycling trip from Vancouver, Canada to Ensenada, Mexico covering over 2,000 miles along the West Coast.

Jurko currently resides in Atlanta, Georgia.
