= Black mamba (disambiguation) =

The black mamba (Dendroaspis polylepis) is a venomous snake.

Black Mamba or The Black Mamba may also refer to:

== Entertainment ==
=== Film ===
- Beatrix Kiddo or Black Mamba, a character in Kill Bill better known as The Bride
- Black Mamba (film), a 1974 horror film
- The Black Mamba (film), a 2011 short film about basketball player Kobe Bryant

=== Music ===
- "Black Mamba" (song), by Aespa
- "Black Mamba", a song from the album Almost Here by The Academy Is...
- Black Mamba, a 2008 album by Mani Spinx
- The Black Mamba (band), a Portuguese band

=== Other entertainment ===
- Black Mamba (character), a supervillain from Marvel Comics

== Nickname ==
- Kobe Bryant (1978–2020), American basketball player
- Roger Mayweather (1961–2020), American boxer
- Sandra Naujoks (born 1981), German professional poker player
- De'Anthony Thomas (born 1993), American football player
- John Butler Walden (1939–2002), Tanzanian military officer

== Military ==
- Black Mamba Anti-Poaching Unit, a South African ranger unit founded in 2013
- Black Mamba (group), an anti-terrorism group in Uganda

== Other uses ==
- Black Mamba (roller coaster), a roller coaster in Phantasialand in Germany
- Black Mamba, a UK brand name for a synthetic cannabinoid
- Black Mamba, a nickname for the roadster bicycle in parts of East Africa
- Black Mamba, a flavor of Venom Energy

== See also ==
- Black Mambas (disambiguation)
