= Mamba (disambiguation) =

Mamba is a genus of snakes.

Mamba may also refer to:

== Arts and entertainment ==
- Mamba (film), 1930 film
- Mamba (band), a Finnish band founded in 1984
- Mamba, the name of a board game in the horror film Open Graves
- MAMBA, the Buenos Aires Museum of Modern Art

== Military and aviation ==
- Mamba APC, an armoured personnel carrier
- Mamba (pistol), Rhodesian 9 mm automatic pistol
- Armstrong Siddeley Mamba, an aircraft engine
- Mamba, a variant of the Cobra anti-tank missile
- MAMBA, the British designation for ARTHUR, a counter-battery radar system
- MAMBA, the French Air Force designation for SAMP/T, a mobile surface-to-air missile system.
- IAC Mamba, a prototype Australian light aircraft of the 1990s.

== Places ==
- Mamba, Tibet, a town
- Kingdom of Mamba, former Chagga state.
- Mamba (Tanzanian ward), a ward in Tanzania
- Mamba, a village in Ancharakandy, Kannur, in Kerala, India
- Mamba Point, zone in Monrovia, Liberia, north of Cape Mesurado

== Other uses ==
- Mamba (deep learning architecture), a deep learning architecture
- Mamba (website), a Russian social dating website
- Mamba (roller coaster), in Missouri, US
- Mamba (surname), a surname (including a list of people with the name)
- Mamba (candy), a fruit flavored candy manufactured by August Storck KG
- Mapungubwe Mambas, South Africa field hockey club
- Saskatoon Mamba, Canadian basketball team

== See also ==
- Black mamba (disambiguation)
- White Mamba (disambiguation)
- Red Mamba, nickname of Matt Bonner
- Mambo (disambiguation)
