= Edgardo Buscaglia =

Italian scholar

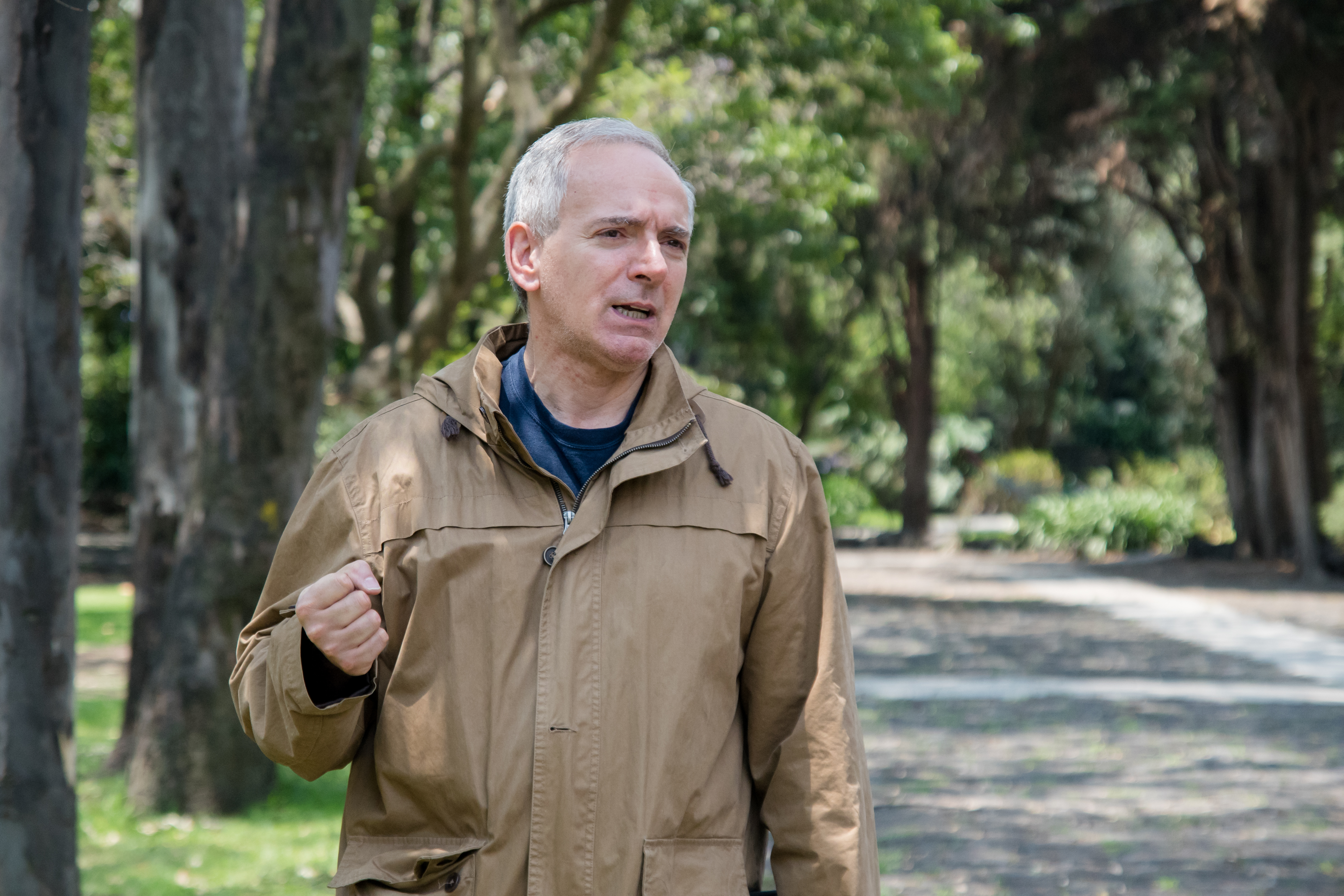
- Born: 25 November 1960 (age 65)
- Known for: senior academic and policy adviser specialised in law and economics, author, philanthropist, civil society leader

Edgardo Buscaglia is a scholar and practitioner within the field of law and economics. Buscaglia is also an international philanthropist and civil society leader engaged in supporting non-governmental organizations in their combat and prevention of organized crime, including his support for combatting wildlife trafficking at the Wildlife Justice Commission or his philanthropic and technical support for preventing human trafficking in Mexico and Central America as Director of the International Law and Economic Development Center.

== Main ideas ==
Buscaglia has concentrated his academic and government-related field work on the economic analysis of organized crime and Corruption within the private and public sectors i.e. complex crimes such as human trafficking, arms trafficking, political corruption, drugs trafficking or acts of terrorism, among nineteen other types of crimes which have a negative impact on the stability of a political system in general and of a democracy in particular.

Buscaglia coined the concept "paradox of expected punishment", understood as the pernicious effect of combating criminal enterprises within the State and private sector by only applying military/police punishment. In an academic peer-reviewed publication Buscaglia empirically demonstrates that organized crime and public sector corruption will both increase if the State only applies more police and military force against criminal networks without at the same time reducing money laundering, without combatting political corruption and without applying social prevention policies against organized crime among the youth and other segments of the population at risk.

Buscaglia's scholarly jurimetrics research empirically verifies the impacts of the United Nations Convention against Corruption and the United Nations Convention against Transnational Organized Crime on key indicators of Organized crime.

Buscaglia's research identified the systemic roots of Political corruption within the nature and structure of electoral systems worldwide and by delving into political campaign financing linked to the vertical integration of legal businesses subject to Money laundering

Buscaglia's law and economics ideas and institutional public policy proposals focused on strengthening the exercise of human rights also overlap with his pro bono work as an internationally renowned philanthropist. Buscaglia's academic peer-reviewed publications have empirically shown that when a population endures the widespread and systemic lack of access to public goods and services considered as human rights in International human rights law (such as the access to justice, the access to water or the access to health services) then organized crime networks will engage in social control of the local population by occupying these state vacuums in order to gain de facto social authority to become "social providers" of public goods.

== Professional career ==
Buscaglia graduated from the University of Buenos Aires. He received his post-doctoral training in Jurisprudence and the Social Policy Program at the University of California at Berkeley Law School. He also received a master's in law and economics and a Ph.D. in economics from the University of Illinois at Urbana-Champaign. Since 1990, he has lectured in law and economics and held visiting professorships at Georgetown University, Washington College, at the Instituto Tecnologico Autonomo de Mexico; Mexican National Autonomous University (UNAM, México), Ghent University (Belgium), Hamburg University (Germany), University of Virginia in Charlottesville (USA), Universidad Nacional del Sur, Universidad de San Andrés and National University of Buenos Aires (Argentina).

Since 1990, Buscaglia has studied the impact of legal and judicial frameworks on economic development and the economic analysis of organised crime and associated corruption. He has participated in field research and provided assistance for international organizations on the economic analysis of judicial and civil society sectors in several countries within Africa, Asia, Latin America and the Middle East

He is currently a Senior Research Scholar in Law and Economics at Columbia University since 2005 and from 1991 until 2008 he was institutionally affiliated as a Fellow with the Hoover Institution at Stanford University. Also, he serves pro-bono as President of the Citizens' Action Institute (Instituto de Acción Ciudadana), a civil society organization aimed at establishing international networks for rescuing and protecting victims of trans-national organized crimes. Buscaglia co-founded this non-governmental organisation in 2007.
