= Damien Mander =

Australian anti-poaching activist

Damien S Mander
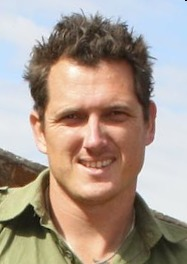
- Damien Mander, in 2010
- Born: 11 December 1979 (age 46); Mornington, Australia
- Organization: International Anti-Poaching Foundation
- Spouse: Briana Evigan
- Children: 1
- Awards: Winsome Constance Kindness Trust Gold Medal (2019)
- Website: www.iapf.org

Damien Mander (born 11 December 1979 in Mornington, Australia) is an anti-poaching activist and the founder of Akashinga (formerly the International Anti-Poaching Foundation (IAPF)). He is a former Australian Royal Navy Clearance Diver and Special Operations military sniper. He is also a director of the Conservation Guardians. In 2019, he received the Winsome Constance Kindness Trust Gold Medal.

== Military career and work ==
Mander joined the Royal Australian Navy in 1999 at age 19, where he trained and qualified as a Naval Clearance Diver. In 2003 he was selected for the Tactical Assault Group (East), an elite direct-action and hostage-recovery unit within the Australian Army's Special Forces 2nd Commando Regiment, as a special operations sniper.

Mander then spent three years in Iraq working for several Private Military Organisations concerned with the protection of Australian diplomats, and was involved in the training of Iraqi Police. Mander went on to project-manage the Iraqi Special Police Training Academy in northern Baghdad, where up to 700 cadets at a time received paramilitary training. The Civilian Police Assistance Training Team (CPATT) project, made up of multinationals, was part of the US-led coalition's effort to develop the Ministry of Interior (MOI) and its Forces. Mander also worked alongside the US Army's Corps of Engineers involved with Iraq's reconstruction efforts. His responsibility was to protect key personnel and to conduct reconnaissance missions on key infrastructure across Iraq.

Mander left Iraq in 2008. He is also a vegan and has spoken publicly about veganism.

== Africa ==
In 2009 Mander traveled to South Africa, Botswana, Namibia, Zambia and Zimbabwe to escape the death and destruction he had seen in Iraq.

After learning about poaching in Southern Africa and the criminal networks that used military equipment and tactics to poach for profit, Mander was convinced that his specialised military skills, personal finances, and experience could contribute significantly to wildlife protection and conservation.

Working as a volunteer with an anti-poaching unit in the Zambezi National Park (Victoria Falls, Zimbabwe), Mander gained first-hand experience of anti-poaching work and the effect of poaching on wildlife. He began writing training packages that would later form the basis of the IAPF's ranger training course.

== International Anti-Poaching Foundation (IAPF) ==
Using his life savings and funds raised from the liquidation of his investment properties acquired through nine years of military service and private military employment, Mander founded the International Anti-Poaching Foundation 2009. He personally funded the start-up and initial running costs, built a ranger training academy at Victoria Falls, Zimbabwe, and bought a two-seater aircraft as well as vehicles for anti-poaching work.

At the IAPF, Mander has operated in South Africa, Kenya, Australia, Zimbabwe, and Mozambique, establishing crack anti-poaching units by putting local indigenous forces through specialist tactical training programs. Since 2015, Mander's work has focused on a community-oriented approach to anti-poaching efforts, and introducing local African women into the workforce through the use of wildlife ranger training and positions as part of Akashinga. He has also provided Ted Talks on his work with the organisation.

== Conservation Guardians ==
Mander is a director of Conservation Guardians, an association that seeks to protect and conserve wildlife.

== Media ==
Mander's anti-poaching and environmentalism work has been featured in National Geographic, Africa Geographic, 60 Minutes, The Guardian Newspaper, BBC, France 24, CBS News, Le Figaro, PBS News, Animal Planet, Al Jazeera, Voice of America, Forbes, Sunday Times, and Good Weekend Magazine.

In 2013, Mander gave a presentation about conservation at TEDx Sydney titled "Modern Warrior". And another at TEDxJacksonHole, titled "From Sniper to Rhino Conservationist".

Mander featured, both as a narrator and as a cast member, in Unity, a feature-length documentary. The subject of the film focuses on humanity's propensity for apathy and empathy, it is divided into four parts: Body, Mind, Heart and Soul. He has also appeared in the documentaries Vegan 2018, The Game Changers, and Last of the Longnecks. The Game Changers covers his life and advocacy as a vegan.

== See also ==
- International Anti-Poaching Foundation
- Anti-poaching
- List of Vegans
