= Deborah Calmeyer =

Founder of safari company Roar Africa

- Occupation: Chief executive officer
- Organization: Roar Africa

Deborah Calmeyer is the founder and chief executive of Roar Africa, an African travel and safari operator.

Calmeyer was born in Zimbabwe and grew up on a farm. She founded Roar Africa in 2005. The company offers safaris and other trips in African countries, including what Roar Africa calls "The Greatest Safari on Earth." Her company's tours have also included visits with the Black Mamba Anti-Poaching Unit.

In 2019, Condé Nast Traveler included Calmeyer in its inaugural "Women Who Travel Power List." Calmeyer contributed an itinerary to African Adventures: The Greatest Safari on Earth, featuring photographs and published by Assouline. In 2025, she contributed to Town & Country's travel adviser roundtable for its hotel awards.

In 2026, Calmeyer launched a culinary trip in Botswana's Okavango Delta, partnering with Michelin-starred Argentine chef Francis Mallmann.
