= IAPF =

IAPF may refer to:

- Inter-American Peace Force established during the Dominican Civil War
- International Anti-Poaching Foundation - IAPF
