= Lone Target =

- Also known as: Manhunt
- Genre: Reality; Documentary
- Starring: Joel Lambert
- Country of origin: United States
- Original language: English
- No. of seasons: 2
- No. of episodes: 12

Production
- Production company: Discovery Studios

Original release
- Network: Discovery Channel
- Release: January 1, 2014 – July 28, 2015

Lone Target, released in the US as Manhunt, is an American television series produced by Discovery Studios. The show follows ex-Navy SEAL Joel Lambert as he attempts to evade mock manhunts organized by various law enforcement and military units around the world.

== Production ==
Each episode pits Lambert against a different law enforcement or military unit (dubbed the "Hunter Force Unit"), in the location where it usually operates; both sides are aware of each other as this is treated as a training exercise. He is dropped off some distance from the designated extraction point with a basic survival kit, together with a cameraman and sometimes a warn dog. Once the Hunter Unit discovers an infiltration within their borders; the exercise begins and Joel must then covertly make his way to the extraction point within a limited amount of time, while avoiding his pursuers, who are tasked with finding and capturing him; simultaneously dealing with mother nature, as well as other unexpected events. A separate camera crew follows the pursuing unit.

== Episodes ==
No.	Title	Pursuers (Hunter Force Unit)	Original release date	U.S. viewers (millions)
1	"South Africa: Safari Survival"	International Anti-Poaching Foundation	January 1, 2014	0.88
Ex-Navy SEAL Joel Lambert is hunted across a private game reserve in South Africa as he faces off against one of the most specialized forces yet, the International Anti-Poaching Foundation (IAPF). With the reserve full of deadly animals including lions, leopards, elephants, and rhinos, Joel must be hyper aware of both the hunter force behind him – and the dangerous game ahead. Composed of ex-military and ex-poachers, the IAPF’s keen tracking skills allow them to spot even the faintest hint of Joel, without the aid of high tech assets. But when the IAPF finds a pride of lions on the prowl, the hunt changes to a life-and-death rescue mission.
2	"Arizona: Testing the Eagle"	US Army	January 8, 2014	0.85
Ex-Navy SEAL Joel Lambert faces off against the U.S. Army's Phantom Recon unit--a battle-tested group of trackers, supremely skilled in hunting down the most elusive of enemy targets. Their turf in southern Arizona is the harsh 75,000 acres of terrain surrounding Fort Huachuca military base, an area home to mountain lions and bears--and a much-favored route of illegal aliens and heavily armed drug smugglers trying to gain passage into the United States. If Phantom Recon weren't intimidating enough, Joel is also being monitored by a squadron of sophisticated unmanned aerial drones, whose cameras have locked in on his every move. With Joel pitted against both top-notch trackers and the latest aerial spyware. In the episode Joel reached the first extraction point just to learn that a real situation elsewhere forced a no flight zone in the area and he need to reach a second extraction point. The Phantom recons closing on him but he managed to get off from the other extraction point by helicopter.
3	"Philippines: Escape the Jungle"	1st Scout Ranger Regiment, Philippine Army	January 15, 2014	0.72
Ex-Navy SEAL Joel Lambert faces off against the Philippine Army Scout Rangers, with just 48 hours to escape the dense jungle. Over a distance of 25 kilometers, and with two trucks as their only assets, the Scout Rangers prove they are among the world’s best at jungle tracking as they utilize their unique skill set to stay hot on Joel’s trail. But the harsh heat and humidity of the Philippine jungle--and an unfortunately timed typhoon--push Joel, the hunter unit and crew to the brink.
4	"Poland: Race to the Bridge"	Polish Border Guard	January 22, 2014	N/A
Ex-Navy SEAL Joel Lambert has just 36 hours to escape and evade Poland’s elite border guard, the Straz Graniczna. Over a distance of 25 kilometers, the border guard deploys all their assets, including thermal camera helicopters, ATV’s, motorcycles, tracking dogs and world class field units, in an attempt to intercept Joel before he reaches his extraction point. As the Straz Graniczna mobilizes dozens of troops, Joel is forced to utilize all of his deception tactics--not to mention, make his way down a 20 meter cliff, and risk a daring truck ride--to attempt to save himself in this battle of Polish pride vs. Joel’s rigorous training.
5	"Panama: Swim to Survive"	National Borders Service of Panama	January 29, 2014	N/A
Panama's elite anti-drug trafficking unit SENAFRONT has just 36 hours to track, hunt and capture ex-Navy SEAL Joel Lambert through the jungles of Isla San José, situated 60 miles off the coast. Joel battles for his freedom through thick rainforest, rocky shorelines, and some surprising wildlife, while SENAFRONT unleash their full arsenal, using ATV patrols, boat units, and ground trackers to pressure Joel from all sides. But when Joel decides to use the natural terrain to conceal his trail, SENAFRONT turns the tables by using one of Joel’s signature moves against him.
6	"South Korea: Hiding in Plain Sight"	Korean National Police	February 5, 2014	0.65
Ex-Navy SEAL Joel Lambert takes on the South Korean National Police (KNP) SWAT unit in a challenge like he’s never faced before--an urban evasion. Situated on the heavily populated and highly trafficked tourist island of Jeju, Joel must alter his tactics to escape the KNP’s web of over 5,000 closed-circuit television cameras, in addition to their boat, air and mobile assets. Nothing is off-limits to Joel as he tries to avoid physical capture through the back alleys of the city. But when the pressure of the KNP becomes too much for Joel, he leads them out into the wilderness on a wild path of deception and near misses.
7	"New Zealand"	Māori Warriors	June 23, 2015	N/A
8	"Mexico"	Procuraduría General de Justicia del Estado (Baja California)	June 30, 2015	N/A
9	"South Carolina"	Aiken County Sheriffs Bloodhound Dog Tracking Team	July 7, 2015	N/A
10	"Scotland"	Scottish Ghillies	July 14, 2015	N/A
11	"Mongolia"	Mongolian Hunters	July 21, 2015	N/A
12	"Florida"	Wampus Cats Hunting Club	July 28, 2015	N/A
