= Black Mambas =

Black Mambas may refer to:

- Black Mambas F.C., a Zimbabwean football club based in Harare, Zimbabwe
- Members of the Black Mamba Anti-Poaching Unit, an environmental organisation in South Africa
- Dendroaspis polylepis, also known as the Black mamba, a venomous snake

== See also ==
- Black mamba (disambiguation)
