= Maison Assouline =

Bookstores run by Assouline Publishing

Maison Assouline is a boutique bookstore run by Assouline Publishing. It has two flagship stores: one on Piccadilly, in London, England, and a second in the Dubai Mall in Dubai, United Arab Emirates.

== Locations ==
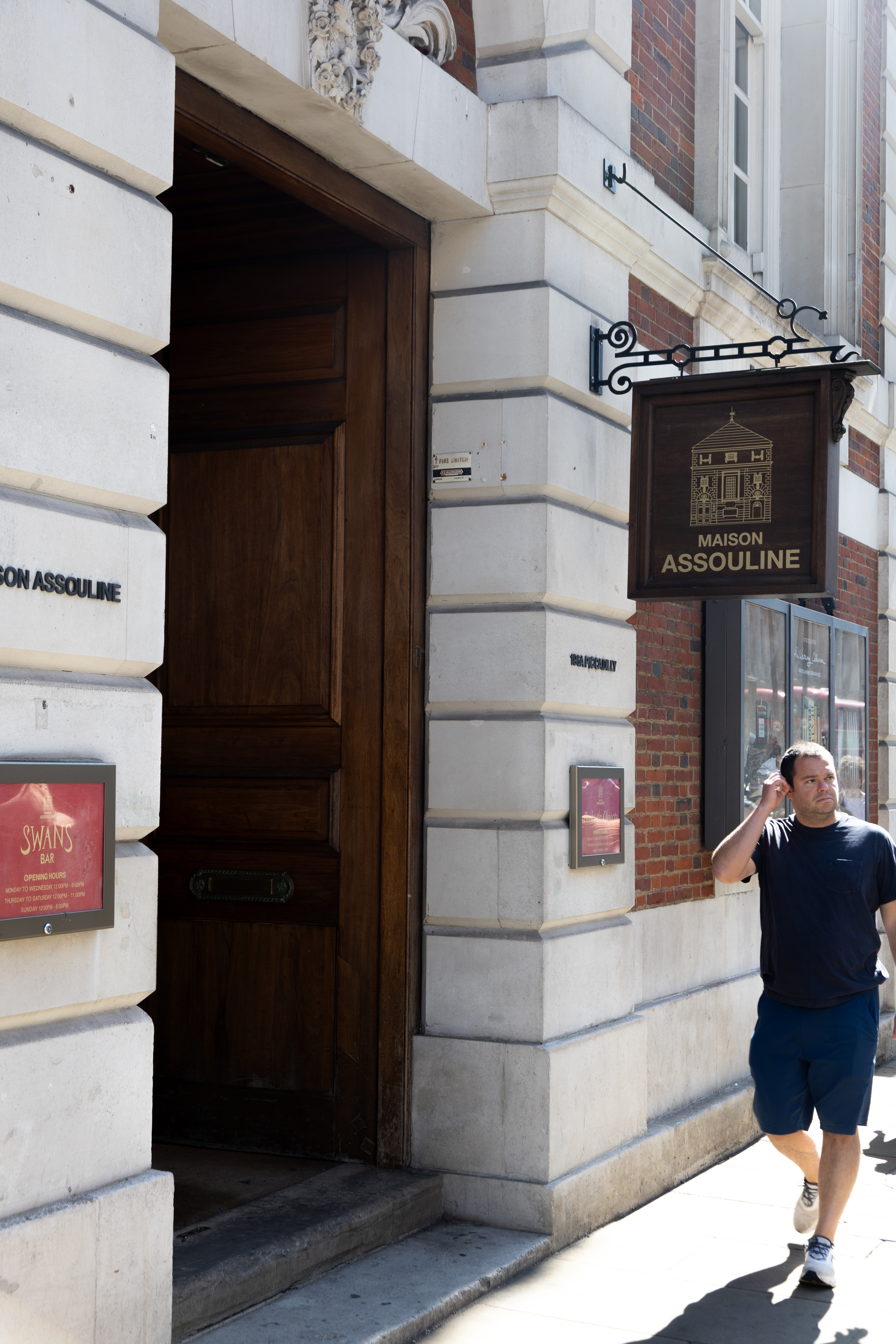
The storefront in London.

=== London ===
The London location, opposite of the Royal Academy of Arts, has three floors and resides in an "old banking hall" designed by Edwin Lutyens. It opened in 2014 and has since hosted numerous book launches and private parties in its bookstore and adjoining bar, the Swans Bar.

Assouline co-founder Alex Assouline intended for it, the very first Maison Assouline, to be "an oasis of culture through books, but to also curate objects and furniture from various eras or regions," while additionally having a hospitality component with an elevated cocktail and dining experience. The Week called it "an art gallery, bookshop, cafe, museum, cocktail bar and cabinet of curiosities all rolled into one." Gucci dubbed it a "must-visit" location in London.

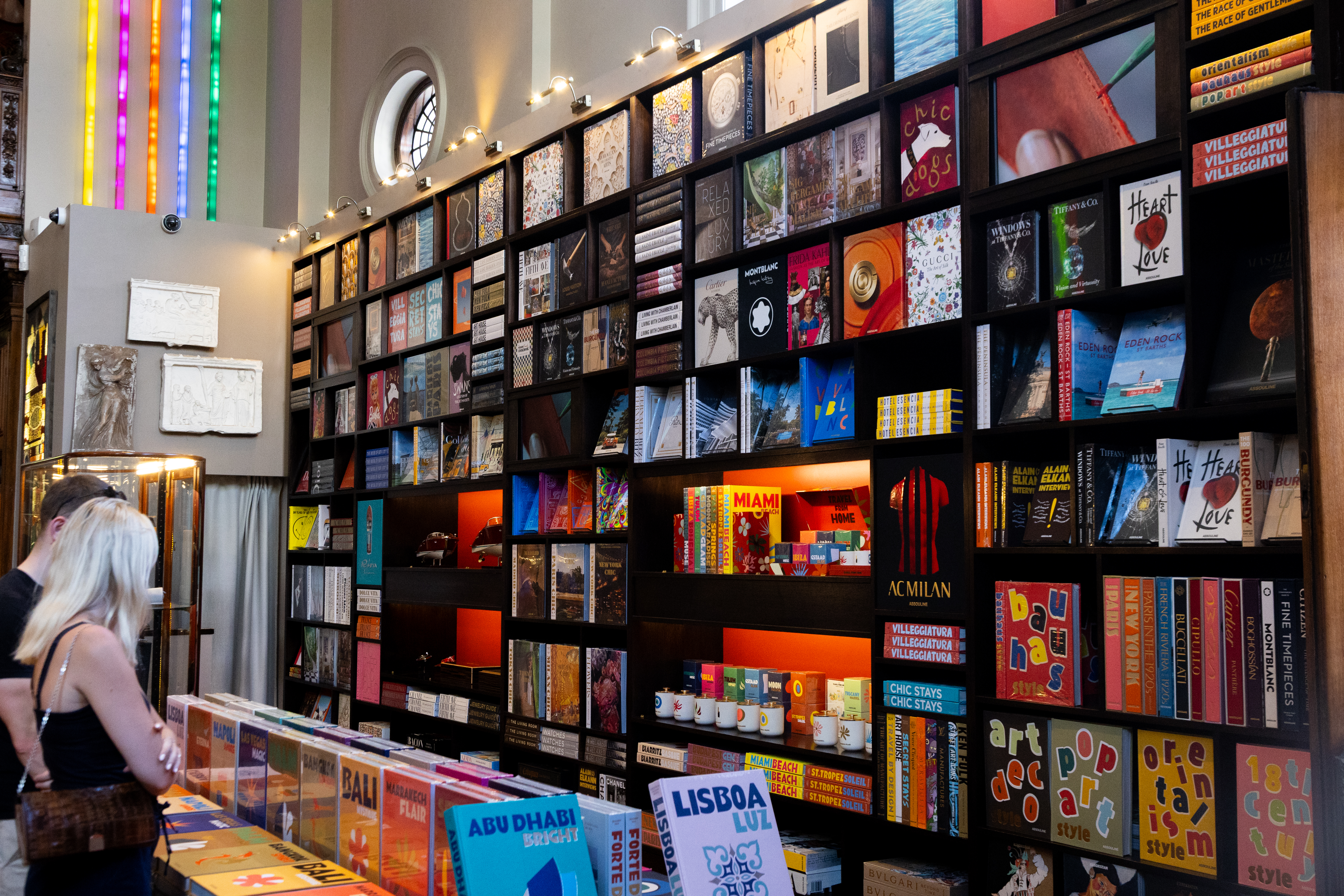
The inside of the London location.

Many have used the Maison Assouline space in London to host their events. In 2015, Louis Vuitton collaborated with Maison Assouline by making 35 displays to launch the haute book, Louis Vuitton Windows. In 2019, Condé Nast Traveller editor in chief Melinda Stevens and fashion director Martha Ward hosted a dinner party at Maison Assouline to celebrate a Christian Louboutin product launch. In May 2025, Gucci launched the book, Gucci: The Art of Silk, at the Maison Assouline; several high-profile guests like Jazzy de Lisser and Suzy Menkes attended. In June, Connaught mixology director Agostino Perrone debuted the Martini Icons show at the Maison Assouline.

=== Dubai ===
In 2018, the second Maison Assouline opened in the Fashion Avenue part of the Dubai Mall. Like the London location, it sells books, gift items, and furniture, with its very own Swans Bar, but Assouline co-founder Martine Assouline also intended for it to be "the company's first culture concept store in the world." Regularly, it hosts pop-up events for "exclusive items" in the Assouline brand.
