= Assouline Publishing =

Book publisher and luxury lifestyle company

- Founded: 1994
- Founders: Martine and Prosper Assouline
- Country of origin: United States
- Headquarters location: 3 Park Avenue, New York City
- Publication types: Books
- Nonfiction topics: Fashion, Travel, Design, Art, Architecture and Cuisine
- Official website: www.assouline.com

Assouline Publishing is a book publisher and luxury lifestyle company founded in 1994 by Prosper and Martine Assouline. It has published more than 2,000 titles on various subjects, including architecture, art, design, fashion, gastronomy, lifestyle, photography, and travel. Beginning in the 2010s, the company branched out to designing, producing, and selling furniture, accessories, and luxury gifts, as well as creating bespoke furnished and accessorized libraries for individuals and hotels.

== History ==
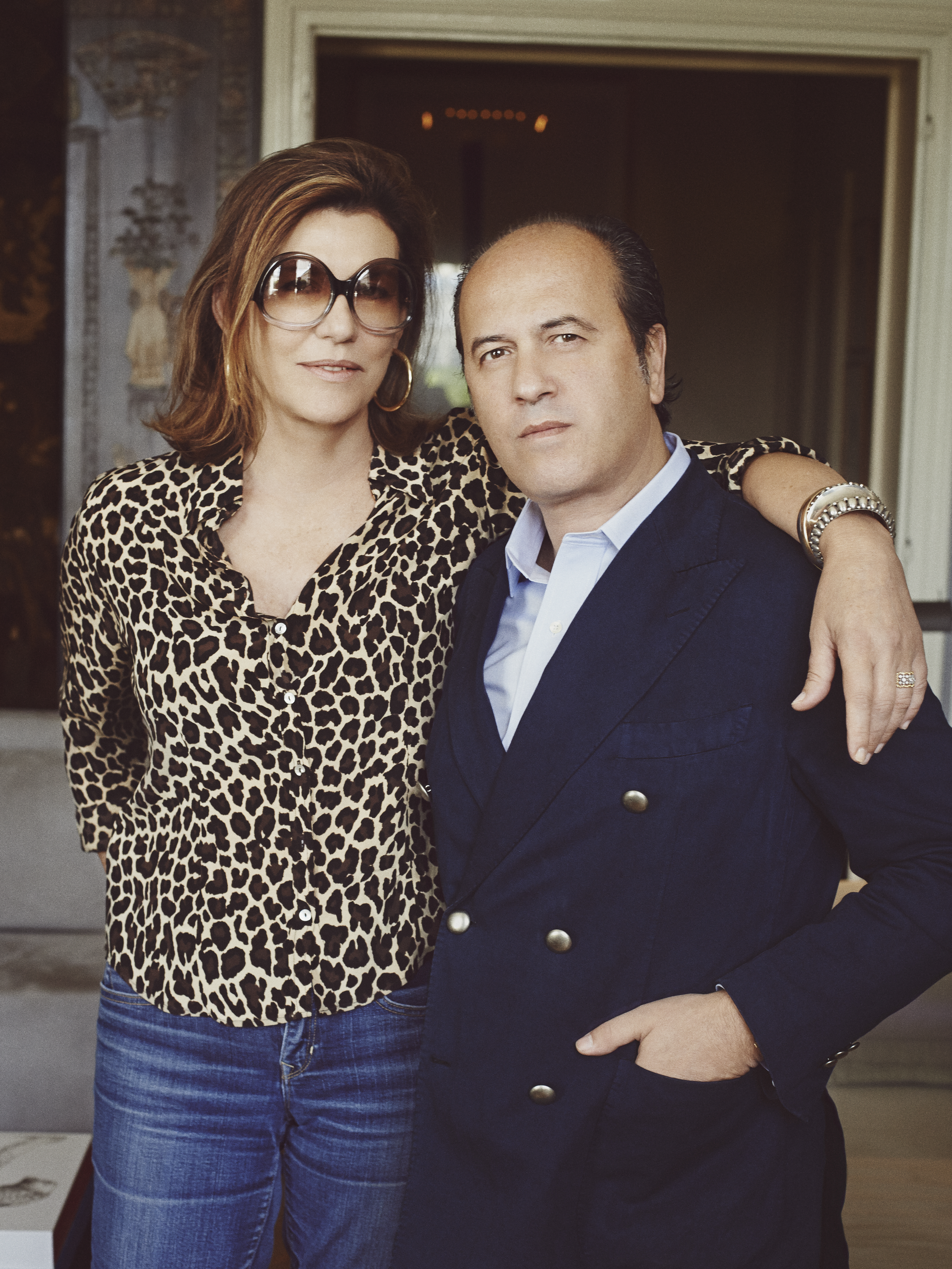
Martine and Prosper Assouline

The publishing house began as a family company in the basement of Martine and Prosper’s apartment in Paris. One year later, the firm opened its first office on rue Danielle Casanova in Paris. The couple’s first published book was La Colombe d'Or (1994) which covers the history of their favorite hotel in the South of France, including photographs by Prosper and text by Martine.

The company went on to establish its first book series in 1996, composed of books focusing on individuals and companies in fashion, jewelry, design, and art.

In 2007, the company owners relocated to New York City, and that same year they began to partner with the Council of Fashion Designers of America. In 2011 Prosper Assouline was awarded the Chevalier des Arts et des Lettres from the French Ministry of Culture for his work in publishing. In 2012, Assouline produced a waterproof book on the subject of the South Pole, as well as Gaia, a book of photos taken on the International Space Station by Guy Laliberté. In 2016, the French Institute Alliance Française awarded the Assoulines with the Art de Vivre award for their publications.

In 2013, LVMH acquired a minority stake in the company. By 2020, Assouline had published more than 1,700 books.

As of the 2020s, Assouline is known for its collections, including its extensive and colorful travel series, its Handcrafted Ultimates collection, its Classics collection, and its signed limited editions such as the special edition of its book on Versailles.

Martine and Prosper's son Alex has been at the company since 2014. As of 2022, he is chief of operations, brand, and strategy.

In 2023, Assouline published its first-ever safari book, African Adventures, about "The Greatest Safari on Earth" in collaboration with Roar Africa's Deborah Calmeyer.

In 2024, The New York Times called Assouline "the Birkin Bag of the book world." The company launched two soccer coffee table books ahead of the 2026 World Cup.

== Boutiques and flagship stores ==
In 2003, Assouline opened a corner boutique in the Bergdorf Goodman Building. The company opened its first standalone boutique in Paris in 2006. Assouline has opened several flagship stores, including a London store entitled Maison Assouline that opened in 2014, which includes a restaurant called the Swans Bar. The company has subsequently opened stores in Spain, Monaco, South Africa, Ukraine, Greece, Bolivia, Manila, and elsewhere.

== Luxury lifestyle brand ==
Since 2011, the company has also been building itself into a luxury lifestyle brand. In addition to books, Maison Assouline in London sells furniture, rare objects, and luxury gifts, and some of Assouline's stores in other locations do as well.

In 2015, Assouline launched an "Haute Couture" furnishings collection called "Assouline Interiors." Assouline also produces accessories, bookbags, and bindery. Assouline has collaborated with global luxury brands including Zara, Oliver Peoples, and Gucci.

The company also creates custom libraries for individuals and hotels including interior design, furniture, vintage objects, and accessories.
