= Operation Corded =

- Part of Anti-Poaching operations.
- Location: Malawi and Zambia
- Planned by: 11th Infantry Brigade and Headquarters South East
- Objective: To provide training to national forces and assist in the suppression and apprehension of the illegal wildlife trade.
- Date: 2018 –
- Executed by: United Kingdom
- Casualties: 1 killed

Operation Corded is the code name for the British military anti-poaching operation to help tackle the ongoing illegal wildlife trade in sub-Saharan Africa. In March 2022 Operation Corded was awarded the Sanctuary Award by the Defence Infrastructure Organisation.

== Background ==
Launched in May 2018 and funded by the Department for Environment, Food and Rural Affairs, the operations' main objective is to train and support local park rangers who are responsible for the day-to-day protection of the national and wildlife parks. Training is provided in tracking, bush craft, investigations and intelligence analysis to improve the interception of poachers. Training is provided by Royal Military Police, army medics and infantry

Patrols are conducted by grouping British servicemen with local rangers in order to ensure the successful retention of training provided.

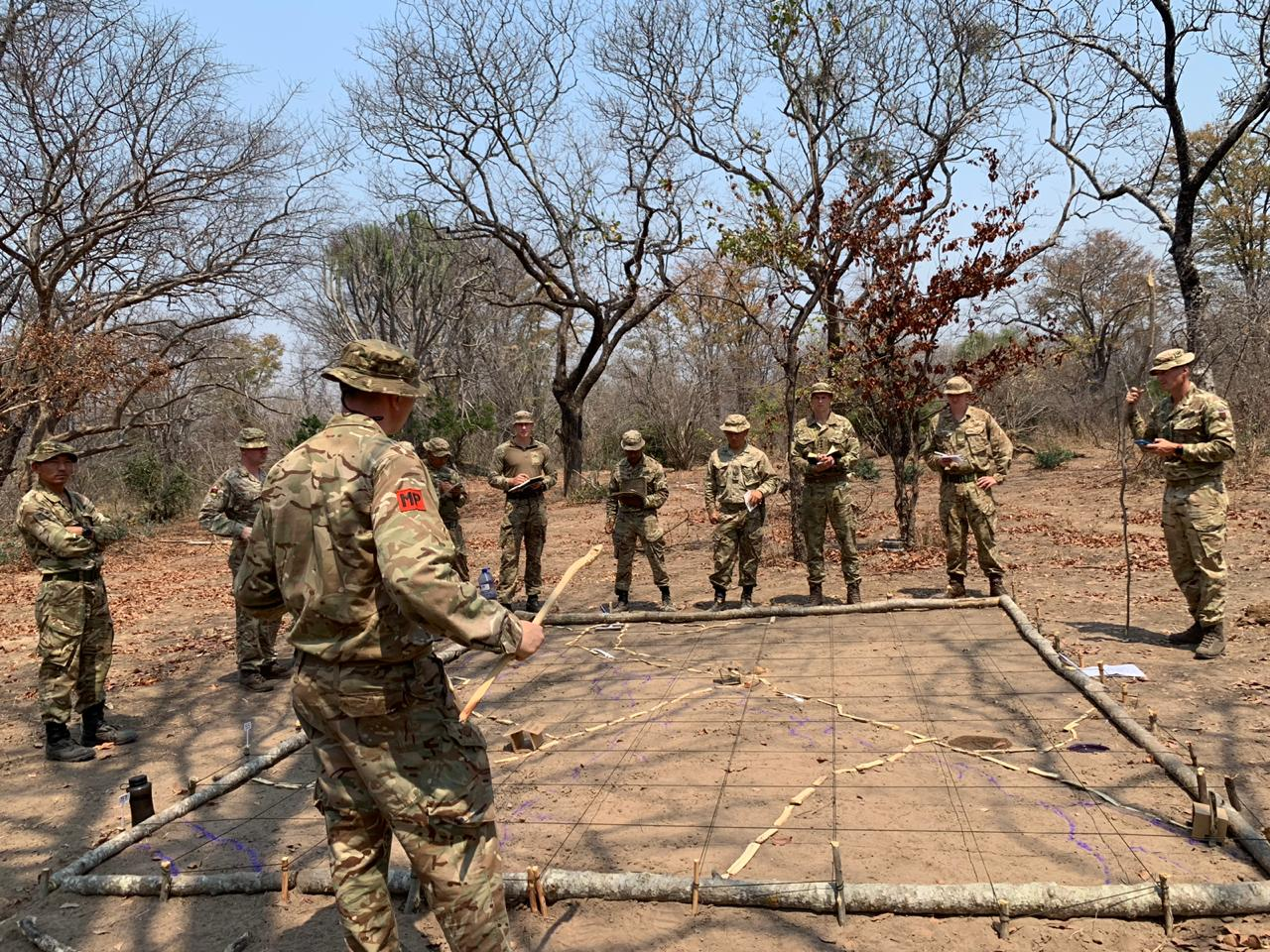
Soldiers deployed on Op Corded being briefed.

== Fatalities ==
On 5 May 2019, whilst patrolling in Liwonde National Park, Guardsman Matthew Talbot was charged by an African elephant and died as a result of injuries sustained, despite medics working on him for 4 hours and 17 minutes.

His body was returned to the United Kingdom on 14 May 2019.

== Controversy ==
As a result of the death of Gdsm Talbot, both Ministry of Defence and coroners enquiries have been conducted. Both have found the military risk assessment and medical timeline strategies to be inefficient, as from the point of injury Gdsm Talbot was approximately 7 hours from the nearest hospital and had not received any pain relief before his death.
