= White Mamba (disambiguation) =

White Mamba is the nickname of:

- Brian Scalabrine (born 1978), American basketball player
- Eli, a fictional character from the video game Metal Gear Solid V: The Phantom Pain
- Diana Taurasi (born 1982), American basketball player

== See also ==
- Mamba (disambiguation)
