= How Many Elephants =

Anti-poaching conservation charity

- Formation: 2019
- Founder: Holly Budge
- Type: Nonprofit organization
- Legal status: UK Registered charity
- Purpose: Conservation
- Headquarters: United Kingdom
- Key people: Holly Budge
- Website: howmanyelephants.org

How Many Elephants is an anti-poaching conservation charity based in the United Kingdom. The charity supports female and mixed ranger teams in Africa.

== History ==
How Many Elephants charity was founded by British adventurer and conservationist Holly Budge in 2019.

== Accomplishments ==
The charity has brought awareness to the plight of elephants in Africa and has also raised support and standards of equality for the female rangers that are protecting the elephants.

=== Campaigns ===
To raise awareness and support How Many Elephants, founder Holly Budge has participated in several events. She skydived Mount Everest in -40 degree temperatures. She crossed Mongolia on horseback. Her newest exploration will be hiking the entire Great Wall of China.

=== Exhibitions ===
Budge also raises awareness around the world through art and design in How Many Elephants exhibitions.

=== Awareness day ===
Spending several weeks with both the Black Mambas and Akashinga inspired How Many Elephants to launch World Female Ranger Week to celebrate female rangers globally that are protecting wildlife.

== See also ==
- Black Mamba Anti-Poaching Unit
- Akashinga
