= Black Mamba Anti-Poaching Unit =

Mostly female conservation effort in South Africa

The Black Mamba Anti-Poaching Unit
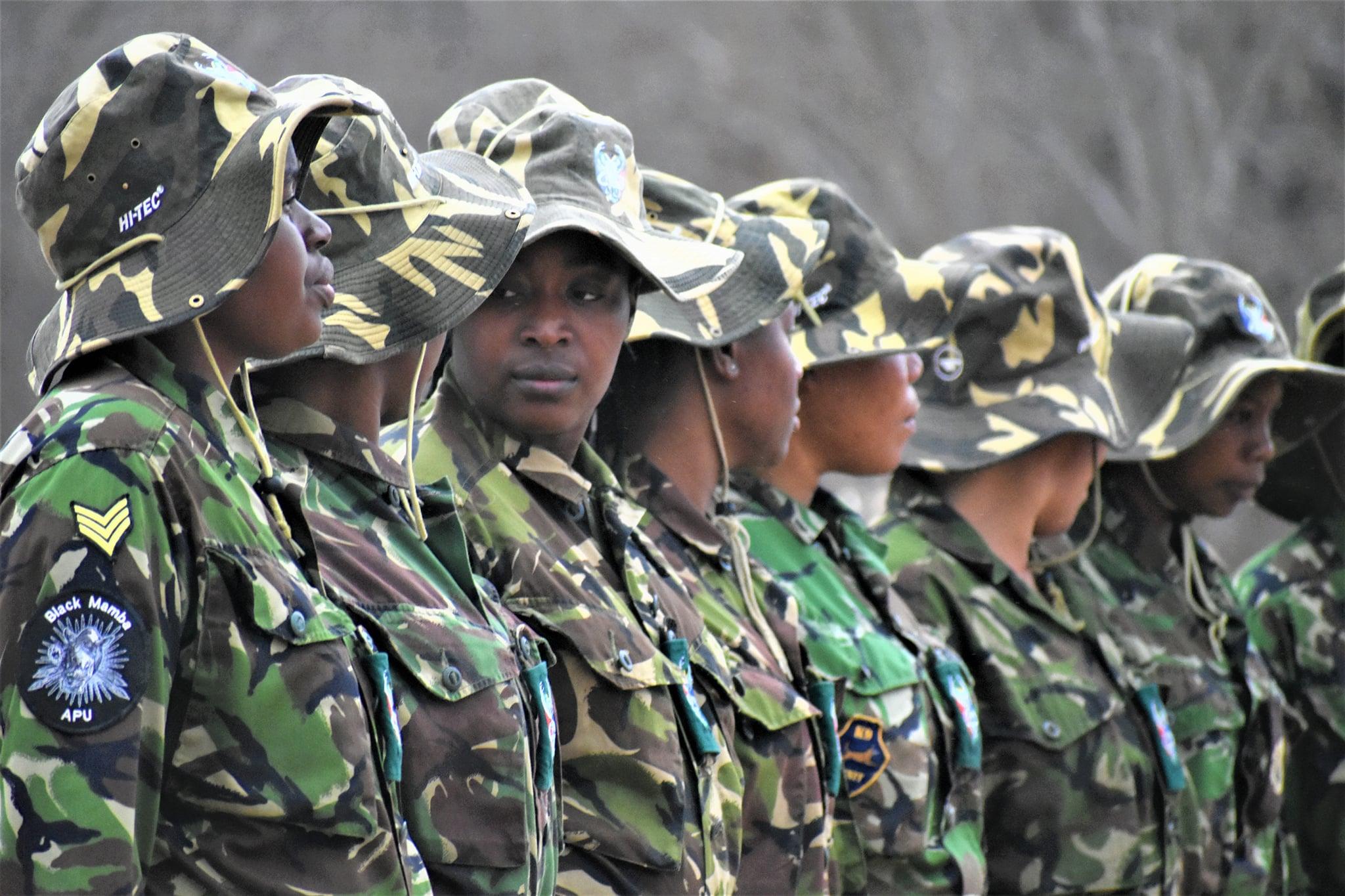
- Black Mambas Women Rangers
- Abbreviation: Black Mamba APU
- Named after: Black mamba
- Formation: 2013
- Founder: Craig R. Spencer
- Type: Non-governmental organisation
- Purpose: Conservation. Education. Women Empowerment
- Headquarters: Greater Kruger Area
- Region served: South Africa
- Staff: 42
- Website: transfrontierafrica.com

The Black Mamba Anti-Poaching Unit (Black Mamba APU) is the world's first officially-formed, registered and recognised all-female wildlife ranger unit, founded in 2013, with the purpose of protecting wildlife in the regions of the Olifants West Nature Reserve, and the buffer zone in the Greater Kruger of South Africa. The Black Mamba APU was awarded the Champions of the Earth Award, in 2015, by the United Nations Environment Program (UNEP). In the period between 2013 and 2022, the Black Mamba APU has won 10 International awards, for innovative approach to wildlife conservation.

== About ==
The unit was created by Craig R. Spencer, the current warden of Olifants West Nature Reserve, and Amy Clark from Transfrontier Africa. The group started out with six members. The Unit is named after the deadly snake, the black mamba snake (Dendroaspis polylepis). There are currently forty two staff members in the Black Mamba APU team, with thirty five of them being women rangers. Each member spends 21 days a month patrolling the reserves. They start each day, military style, with a parade and then issued orders before patrols leave on their missions. Each of the rangers is trained in tracking and combat, but work unarmed, and they protect the animals by creating a

"visible police presence, like a British bobby.

— Jeffrey Barbee

The Mambas come from the local communities near the Greater Kruger area. For many Black Mambas, becoming a ranger is a major step in life, right after high school. The Unit had been part of the nationwide Environmental Monitor program, that received 30% subsidy from the Department of Fisheries, Forestry and Environmental Affairs, South Africa. Due to internal financial issues, the department stopped the subsidy in March 2022. From April 2022, Transfrontier Africa NPC relies solely on fundraising, grants, and donations to support the project. Currently, a newly formed Black Mamba Alliance, which consists of a group of companies, sponsor 100% of the salaries of The Black Mambas and its sister project The Bush Babies Environmental Education Program.

The unit assisted in several arrests of poachers, shut down five poacher camps, and reduced snaring of wildlife in its deployment areas by 62% within its first year. The Mambas are trained to find and remove snares before animals get trapped. During 2015, there was a ten-month period when no rhinos were poached at all.

At first people were sceptical that "women could do this traditionally male job and be good at it." Now, within their communities, the Black Mambas have become village heroes. Photographer Julia Gunther, who has been documenting the Black Mambas APU, says of the women that "For all of them, the love for nature and its conservation runs deep. Their ethos is to protect this heritage of wildlife." The rangers face dangers not only from poachers but also from large wildlife; Ranger Siphiwe Sithole said, "I don't know when I am going to face a lion." Another member, Leitah Mkhabela, said regarding poachers, "I am not afraid. I know what I am doing and why I am doing it."

In July 2015, the Black Mamba APU won the Best Conservation Practitioner category in the South African Rhino Conservation Awards. Later that year, they won the Champions of the Earth Award from UNEP.

In June 2023, Leitah Mkhabela joined a delegation of rangers and film crew members at the private premiere of the documentary Rhino Man, hosted by Prince William of Wales and his United for Wildlife conservation network. Leitah represented women rangers on this international platform, showcasing the work of the Black Mambas.

== Awards won ==
The unit has won the following awards:

- 2015 - Best Conservation Practitioner of the Year by Rhino Conservation Award.
- 2015 - Champions of the Earth by the United Nations
- 2017 - Eco-Warrior Silver Award
- 2019 - Change Maker in Tourism Craig R. Spencer by Global Travel and Tourism Resilience Council
- 2019 - Resilient Efforts Through Cultural Diversity and Environmental Sensitivity by Global Travel and Tourism Resilience Council
- 2020 - Ranger of the Year (Supervisor Leitah Mkhabela) by the International Paradise Foundation, China
- 2020 - Earth Care Award by the Sierra Club, USA
- 2021 - Highly Commended Ranger (Sergeant Nkateko Mzimba) by IUCN
- 2022 - Pioneers with Purpose by Scientific Exploration Society, UK
- 2022 - Highly Commended Ranger Team by IUCN
- 2023 - Best Field Ranger (Sergeant Nkateko Letti Mzimba) by African Conservation Awards

== In popular culture ==
The Black Mambas are the subject of the book The Black Mambas: The World's First All-Woman Anti-Poaching by Kelly Crull, which was included in Rise: A Feminist Book Project's Top Ten of 2026.

== See also ==
- Akashinga
- How Many Elephants
- Holly Budge
- Kruger National Park
