= Akashinga =

Zimbabwean anti-poaching group

- Formation: 2017
- Founder: Damien Mander
- Purpose: Anti-poaching
- Region served: Zimbabwe
- Parent organization: International Anti-Poaching Foundation
- Website: www.akashinga.org

The Akashinga Rangers is an all-female anti-poaching group in Zimbabwe. The group is the subject of a 2020 documentary titled Akashinga: The Brave Ones.

== History ==
Akashinga was founded in 2017. The women of Akashinga were recruited by Australian conservationist Damien Mander, founder of Akashinga (formerly the International Anti-Poaching Foundation). The original 16 Akashinga were recruited to be conservation officers for Phundundu Wildlife Park. The word Akashinga means "the brave ones" in Shona. The Akashinga Rangers are an arm of Akashinga (formerly the International Anti-Poaching Foundation).

== Operations ==
In contrast to other all-female anti-poaching groups such as the Black Mamba Anti-Poaching Unit in South Africa, the rangers of Akashinga are armed. Since 2017, the group has arrested hundreds of poachers.

== Rangers ==
Many of the Akashinga Rangers are vegan. Many of the Akashinga are survivors of domestic abuse and/or sexual assault.

In March 2017, two rangers and a male trainer drowned while crossing a river.

=== Notable former rangers ===
- Tariro Mnangagwa

== Akashinga: The Brave Ones ==
The short documentary Akashinga: The Brave Ones was directed by Maria Wilhelm. It was produced by Kim Butts, Drew Pulley, and Wilhelm and was executive produced by James Cameron. Akashinga: The Brave Ones premiered in 2020 at the EarthXFilm Festival. It was an official selection of the Tribeca Film Festival and was later broadcast on National Geographic. Akashinga is also available to stream on YouTube.

== See also ==
- Black Mamba Anti-Poaching Unit
- How Many Elephants
- Holly Budge
