= Anton Mzimba =

South African field ranger (1980–2022)

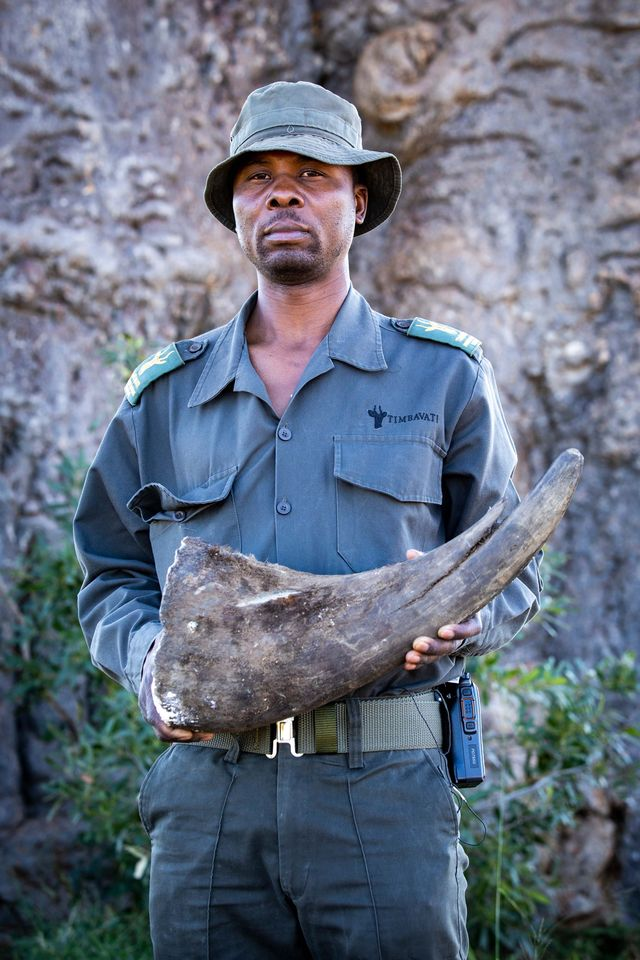
- Born: February 11, 1980; Mozambique
- Died: July 26, 2022 (aged 42); Edinburgh, South Africa
- Cause of death: Murder
- Education: Southern African Wildlife College
- Occupations: Field Ranger; Head of Ranger Services; Technical Advisor
- Years active: 1997–2022
- Employer: Timbavati Private Nature Reserve
- Organization: Global Conservation Corps
- Awards: IUCN/WCPA International Ranger Award, African Conservation Award, Rhino Conservation Award

Anton Mzimba (February 11, 1980 – July 26, 2022) was a South African field ranger who spent his 25 year career working at the Timbavati Private Nature Reserve. He was murdered in an attack widely believed to be connected to his work as a ranger preventing rhino poaching in the Kruger National Park region.

== Career ==
In June 1997, Mzimba began his conservation career as an erosion fieldwork team member at the Timbavati Private Nature Reserve. In April 1998, he passed his basic field ranger training and became one of the youngest field rangers within the unit. In 2003, he was promoted to Full Corporal Instructor, overseeing a training program to maintain his team's physical and mental fitness. In 2008, Mzimba was promoted to Head of Ranger Services for the Timbavati Private Nature Reserve, overseeing the ranger team and security operations of the entire reserve, where he remained until his death.

Mzimba also served as a technical advisor to the Global Conservation Corps (GCC) contributing to the development of their Future Rangers Program, which provides conservation education and career pathways.

== Death ==
On 26 July 2022, after months of receiving threats, gunmen appeared at Mzimba's home. According to police, they said their car had broken down and asked for help. When they approached Mzimba, they shot him and his wife. Mzimba did not survive his wounds, but his wife made a full recovery. As of 27 August 2024, no arrests have been made in connection with his murder.

Mzimba's death brought recognition and calls to action from many in the conservation space, including Barbara Creecy, then Minister of Forestry, Fisheries and the Environment, South Africa, and Prince William of Wales, the Founder and President of United for Wildlife, who called for justice in a Tweet.

== Movie ==
Mzimba's life, death, and career as a ranger are documented in Rhino Man, a film that covers the rhino poaching crisis and the role of rangers in South Africa. Anton's murder took place during post-production, and was later incorporated into the story. It premiered on 13 June 2023, at a private screening hosted by United for Wildlife at the Cinema in the Battersea Power Station, London, attended by Prince William, Prince of Wales and Duchess Sophie of Edinburgh.

== Awards ==
In 2016, Mzimba won the Best Field Ranger award at the Rhino Conservation Awards run by the Game Rangers Association of Africa (GRAA).

Posthumously, Mzimba won the Best Game Ranger award at the GRAA 2022 African Conservation Awards, and in 2023 he won an IUCN/WCPA International Ranger Award.

== Podcasts ==
Anton Mzimba and his story have been featured in several podcasts.

- 2024 - Pull The Thread - The Wild Life, Season 1, Episode 4: Incorruptible
- 2022 - National Park After Dark - 92: People of the Parks - Rhino Man with John Jurko II
- 2022 - The Rhino Man Podcast - Ep 6: Anton Mzimba - Life of a ranger at the Timbavati Private Nature Reserve
- 2022 - Voices of Nature Podcast - Episode 22: Rhino Man Behind the Scenes with the Rangers and Filmmakers
- 2021 - Voices of Nature Podcast - Episode 2: Anton Mzimba and the Life of a Ranger

== See also ==
- List of environmental killings
