= Julia Gunther =

- Born: Berlin, Germany
- Education: University of the Arts, London
- Known for: Photography
- Notable work: Proud Women of Africa
- Website: juliagunther.com

Julia Gunther (born 1979) is a photographer and cinematographer who makes documentary projects. From 2003 to 2008, Gunther worked as electrician or lighting assistant on films such as Black Book (2006) and Nothing to Lose (2008). Since then she has made an ongoing photography series called Proud Women of Africa. She lives in Amsterdam but travels for her photography.

== Life and work ==
Gunther was born in 1979 in Berlin, Germany. She graduated from University of the Arts, London in 2003 with a degree in Film and Video studies.

Gunther has an ongoing photography series called Proud Women of Africa, based on her experiences in Cape Town. It portrays African women who have endured many hardships but do not see themselves as victims of oppression. Installments of this project include Ruthy Goes to Church (2012), Rainbow Girls (2013), Maternity Ward (2013), Chedino & Family (2015), and The Black Mambas: An All-Female Anti-Poaching Unit (2015).

In 2016, she traveled to Tanzania on an assignment for Sightsavers and documented the stories of four children with cataracts. This project includes Haji's Story, Paulo's Story, Baraka's Story, and Magda's Story.

She has been a blogger for The Huffington Post since 2016.

== Film contributions ==
- Deuce Bigalow: European Gigolo (2005) – lighting assistant
- Black Book (2006) – assistant electrician (as Julia Günther)
- Nothing to Lose (2008) – electrician
