= Park ranger =

Person who protects and preserves parklands

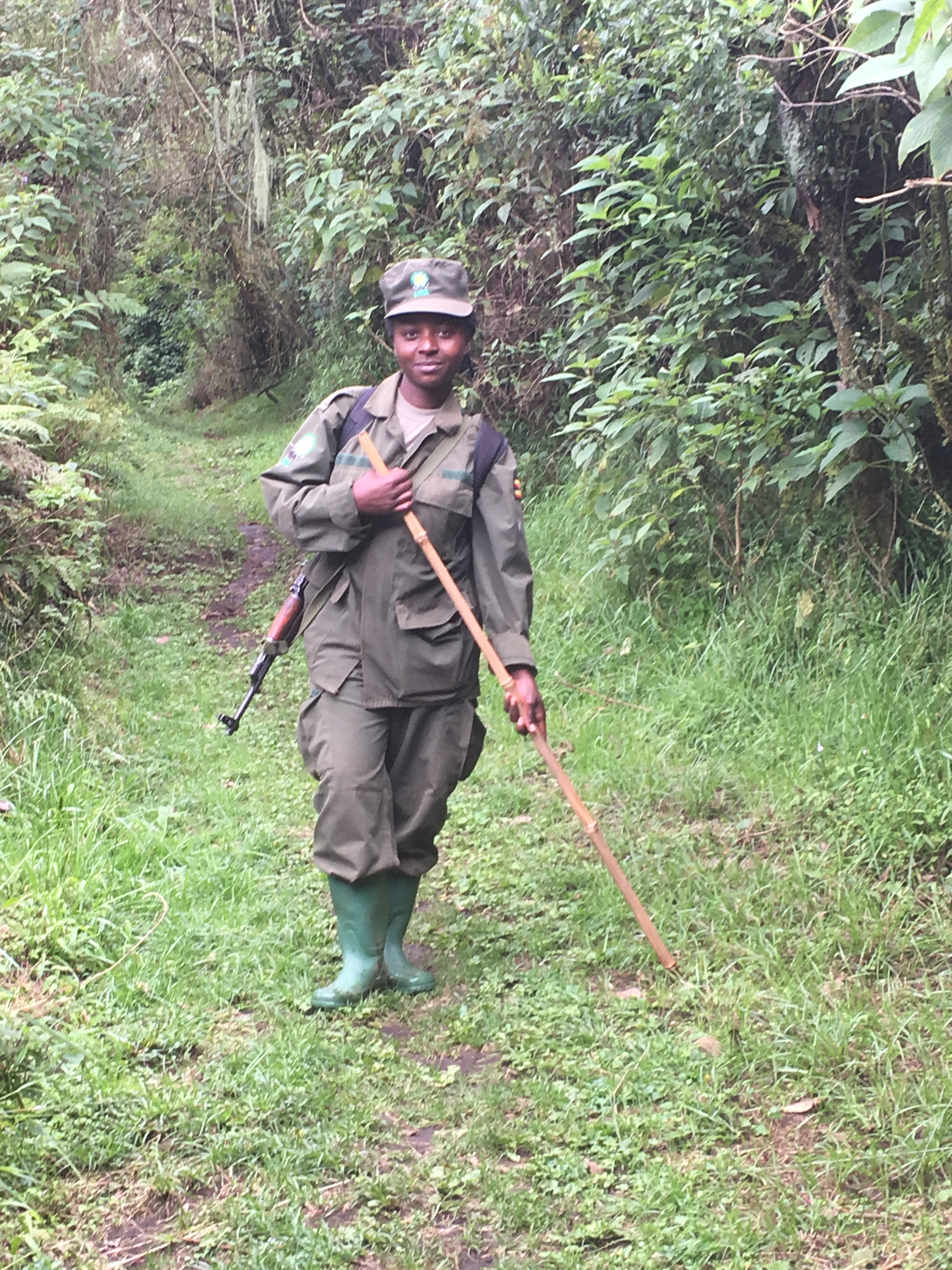
Park ranger in Uganda

A ranger (also known as park ranger, park warden, field ranger, or forest ranger) is a person entrusted with protecting and preserving parklands and protected areas – private, national, state, provincial, or local parks.

Rangers perform a broad range of duties that vary by jurisdiction, agency, and specific park needs. These responsibilities typically encompass law enforcement, wildlife and natural resource management, community engagement and education, maintenance of recreation areas, and emergency response, including firefighting. Common tasks include patrolling protected lands, monitoring wildlife populations, removing snares and invasive species, confronting poachers, enforcing conservation regulations, and addressing human-wildlife conflicts. Many rangers hold law enforcement authority, allowing them to investigate violations, issue citations, and make arrests.

In addition to protection and enforcement roles, rangers often serve as interpreters and educators. They lead guided tours, deliver programs on natural and cultural history, staff visitor centers, and promote public understanding of environmental stewardship. They also maintain trails, facilities, and infrastructure while supporting search-and-rescue operations and visitor safety. The role requires diverse skills in ecology, public safety, communication, and resource management.

Duties and training standards for rangers differ significantly around the world and have evolved in response to changing pressures on natural and cultural areas, including poaching, habitat loss, climate change, and rising visitor numbers.

== Description ==
"Parks" in this context may be broadly defined by some systems in this context and may include forests, wildlife preserves, deserts, beaches, and even protected culturally/historically important manmade environments and monuments. Park rangers are not limited to working in the natural environment.

Different countries use different names for this occupation. Warden is the favored term in Canada, Ireland, the United Kingdom, and many other Commonwealth countries. The profession includes a number of disciplines and specializations, and park rangers are often required to be proficient in more than one.

The nomenclature is more complex in the United States. The National Park Service refers to the position as Park Ranger for all law enforcement, interpretive, and fee collection booth rangers. Similarly, within the Bureau of Land Management, interpretive staff members are called Park Rangers while law enforcement staff are referred to as LE Rangers. District Rangers in the U.S. Forest Service do not perform the same duties, instead focusing on administration/management of “Ranger Districts”, large subunits of National Forests. Few other positions in the U.S. Forest Service are officially titled "Ranger", but there are several positions that perform similar or identical outdoor work including those with the titles Forester, Forestry Technician, and Law Enforcement Officer. Many are referred to colloquially as "rangers" such as Wilderness Rangers, Climbing Rangers, Snow Rangers, Recreation Rangers, and Forest Protection Officers even though they are all officially categorized as Forestry Technicians.

== History ==
In medieval England, rangers, originally called under-foresters, were the most junior officials employed to "range" through the countryside enforcing the forest law imposed by William the Conqueror to protect the "vert and venison". Their duties were originally confined to seeing that the Forest Law was enforced in the borders, or purlieus, of the royal forests. Above them were the Foresters-in-Fee (later called Woodwards), then the Verderers, then the Justices in Eyre. Their duties corresponded in some respects with that of a mounted forester.

The term ranger seems to correspond to the Medieval Latin word regardatores which appeared in 1217 in the Charter of the Forest. Regardatores was later rendered as rangers in the English translations of the Charter. Others translate it as regarders. For example, the fifth clause of the Charter of the Forest is commonly translated: "Our regarders shall go through the forests making the regard as it used to be made at the time of the first coronation of the aforesaid King Henry [II] our grandfather, and not otherwise." A "regard" is considered to be an inspection of the forest.

The earliest letters patent found mentioning the term refers to a commission of a ranger in 1341. Documents from 1455 state that England had "all manner and singular Offices of Foresters and Rangers of our said Forests".

One of the first appearances of ranger in literature is in Edmund Spenser's poem The Shepheardes Calendar from 1579: "[Wolves] walk not widely, as they were wont, for fear of rangers and the great hunt."

The office of Ranger of Windsor Great Park appears to have been created in 1601.

=== North America, 17th–19th centuries ===
In North America, rangers served in the 17th through 18th-century wars between colonists and Native American Indian tribes. Rangers were full-time soldiers employed by colonial governments to patrol between fixed frontier fortifications in reconnaissance providing early warning of raids. During offensive operations, they acted as scouts and guides, locating villages and other targets for task forces drawn from the militia or other colonial troops. During the Revolutionary War, General George Washington ordered Lieutenant Colonel Thomas Knowlton to select an elite group of men for reconnaissance missions. This unit was known as Knowlton's Rangers, and was the first official Ranger unit for the United States; it is the precursor of the modern day Army Rangers.

=== Early conservation in the United States, 1866–1916 ===
The word was resurrected by Americans in the 19th and 20th centuries from the old idioms used for the wardens – royally appointed – who patrolled the deer parks and hunting forests in England.

There is much debate among scholars about which area was the world's first national park (Yosemite or Yellowstone), so there is little agreement about who was the first National Park service ranger. Some argue that Galen Clark was first when, on May 21, 1866, he became the first person formally appointed and paid to protect and administer Yosemite, thus become California's and the nation's first park ranger. Clark served as the Guardian of Yosemite for 24 years. Others point to Harry Yount who worked as a gamekeeper in Yellowstone National Park in 1880–1881. Prophetically, Yount recommended "the appointment of a small, active, reliable police force...[to] assist the superintendent of the park in enforcing laws, rules, and regulations." The first permanent appointment of rangers in a national park occurred on September 23, 1898, when Charles A. Leidig and Archie O. Leonard became forest rangers at Yosemite National Park.

One of the earliest uses of the term ranger was on badges with the title "Forest Reserve Ranger" which were used from 1898 to 1906 by the U.S. Department of the Interior. These badges were presumably issued to rangers working in the national parks as well as those in the national forests, since both were known as Forest Rangers at that time.

The term ranger was also applied to a reorganization of the Fire Warden force in the Adirondack Park after 1899 when fires burned 80,000 acres (320 km^{2}) in the park. The name was taken from Rogers' Rangers, a small force famous for their woodcraft that fought in the area during the French and Indian War in 1755.

== Duties, disciplines and specializations ==
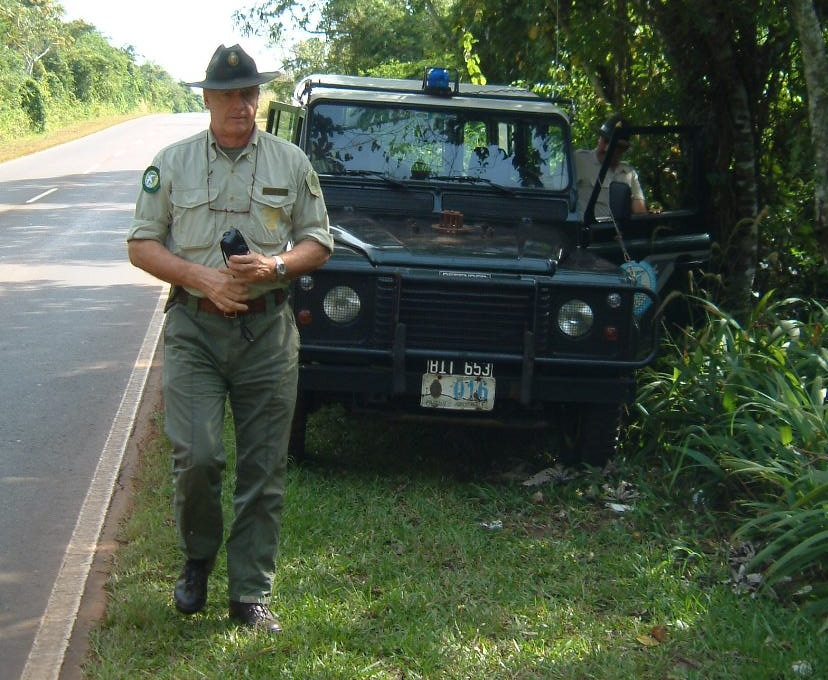
Jorge Cieslik, a park ranger in the Iguazú National Park in Argentina, on the border with Brazil and Paraguay

The duties of the modern park ranger are as varied and diverse as the parks where they serve and in recent years have become more highly specialized. Regardless of the regular duties of any one discipline, the goal of all rangers remains to protect the park resources for future generations and to protect park visitors. This goal is accomplished by the professionalism and sometimes overlapping of the different divisions. For example, an interpretive ranger may perform a law enforcement role by explaining special park regulations to visitors and encouraging them to be proper stewards of natural and cultural history. Law enforcement rangers and other park employees may contribute to the mission of the interpretive ranger by providing information to park visitors about park resources and facilities. The spirit of teamwork in accomplishing the mission of protecting the parks and people is underscored by the fact that in many cases, for the U.S. National Park Rangers in particular, all park rangers share a common uniform regardless of work assignment. Similarly, in the U.S. Forest Service, due to the broad landscapes and relatively fewer employees, any field going employee (that meets the background and training requirements) can be certified as an unarmed Forest Protection Officer with the authority to write federal citations even though they are not armed/sworn Forest Service Law Enforcement Officers.

- Law enforcement: Law enforcement rangers have police powers and enforce national, state, provincial, and/or local laws as well as park regulations. In some developing countries, the park rangers patrolling natural preserves may be heavily armed and function as paramilitary organizations against organized poachers or even guerrillas. (Too, some are armed with machine guns to protect expeditions from rhinos and elephants.) In many other developing countries, park rangers have law enforcement authority and do carry firearms as they seek to achieve respect for nature by building good relationships with local communities and the visiting public. In units of the U.S. National Park System, Law Enforcement Rangers are the primary police agency; their services may be augmented by the US Park Police, particularly in the Washington, DC and San Francisco metropolitan areas. The U.S. National Park Service also has a section of "Special Agents" who conduct more complex criminal investigations. According to U.S. Department of Justice statistics, National Park Service Law Enforcement Rangers suffer the highest number of felonious assaults, and the highest number of homicides of all federal law enforcement officers. The City of New York has a uniformed division of Park Rangers called the New York City Parks Enforcement Patrol who are responsible for patrolling the city parks, pools and beaches.
- Interpretation and education: Park Rangers provide a wide range of informational services to visitors. Some Rangers provide practical information—such as driving directions, train timetables, weather forecasts, trip-planning resources, and beyond. Rangers may provide interpretive programs to visitors intended to foster stewardship of the resources by the visitor as a method of resource protection. Interpretation in this sense includes (but is not limited to): guided tours about the park's history, ecology, or both; slideshows, talks, demonstrations; informal contacts, and historical re-enactments. Rangers may also engage in leading more formalized curriculum-based educational programs, meant to support and complement instruction received by visiting students in traditional academic settings and often designed to help educators meet specific national and/or local standards of instruction. All uniformed rangers, regardless of their primary duties, are often expected to be experts on the resources in their care, whether they are natural or cultural.
- Emergency response: Rangers are often trained in wilderness first aid and participate in search and rescue to locate lost persons in the wilderness. Many national parks require law enforcement rangers to maintain certification as Emergency Medical Responders, Emergency Medical Technicians, or Paramedics. Depending on the needs of the park where assigned, rangers may participate in high-angle rescue, swift-water rescue, may be certified scuba divers, and can become specially trained as helicopter pilots or crew members.
- Firefighting: Rangers are often the first to spot forest fires and are often trained to engage in wildland firefighting and in some cases structural fire fighting. Rangers also enforce laws and regulations regarding campfires and other fires on parklands. In the face of a fire outside their control, rangers will call for help and evacuate persons from the area pending the arrival of additional firefighters.
- Dispatcher: Some rangers work as park protection dispatchers, answering emergency calls and dispatching law enforcement rangers, park fire fighters or Park EMS crews by radio to emergency calls for service. Park Dispatchers provide pre-arrival instructions to callers to help them stay alive until responding units arrive. Dispatchers coordinate multi-agency responses to emergencies within the park boundaries and utilize computer systems to check for criminal histories of subjects stopped by park law enforcement rangers. Park Dispatchers typically perform other duties such as taking lost-and-found reports, monitoring CCTV surveillance cameras and fire alarms. Dispatchers are assigned to the Park Protection Division.
- Scientists and scholars: Rangers are responsible for protecting the natural resources or cultural sites for which they work. This includes obtaining and preserving knowledge about the area. As such, many different types of historians and scientists are employed as rangers. Some scientific positions often filled by rangers include archaeologist, many different types of biologist, ecologist, geologist, hydrologist, paleontologist, soil scientist, volcanologist, etc. Rangers in these positions are expected to study, monitor, and inform others (in the form of published, peer-reviewed scientific papers as well as internally) about their findings. These people add to the knowledge dispersed in interpretive and educational programs, and provide information needed by managers and others to more effectively protect the resource.

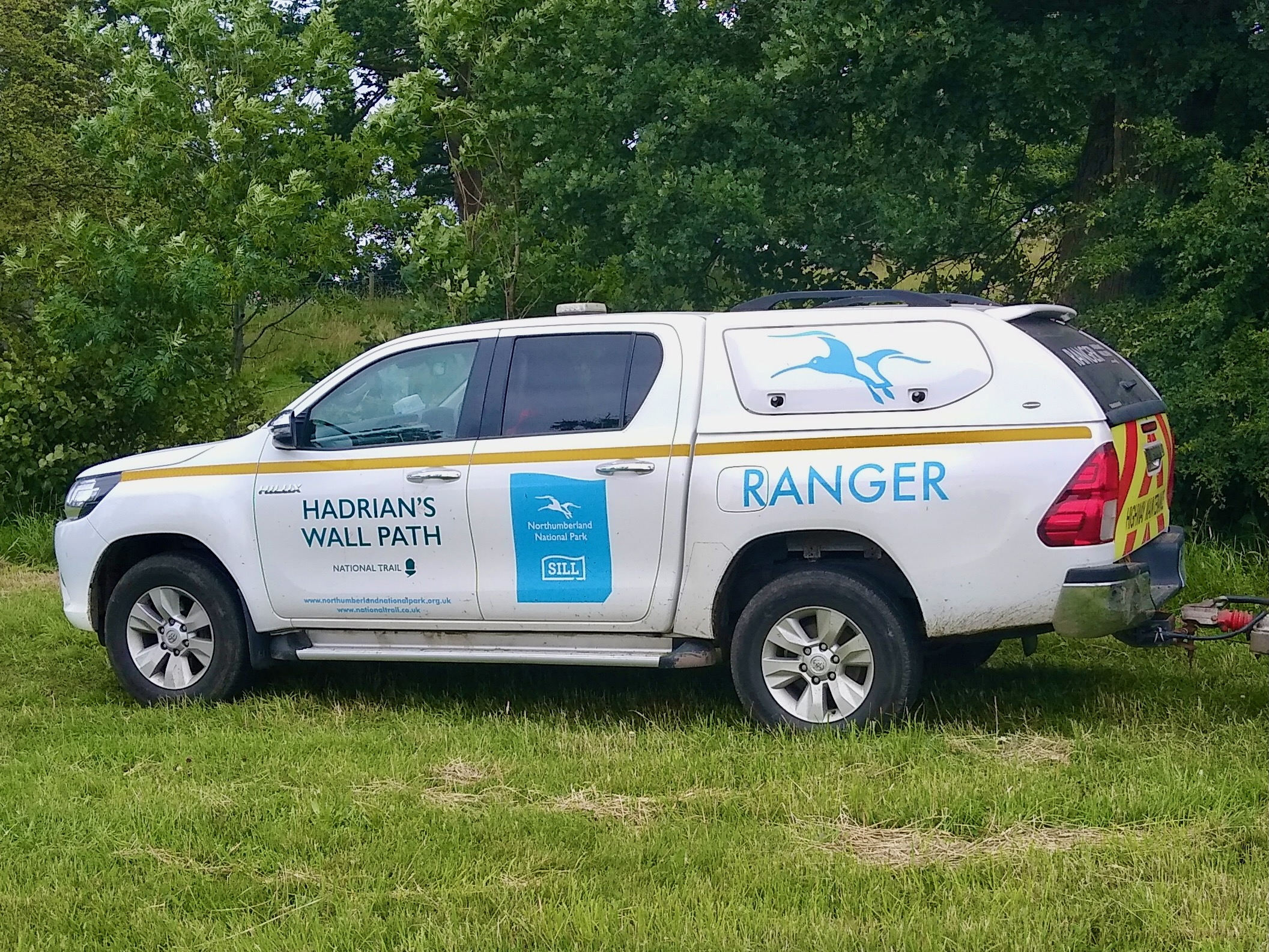
A vehicle used by rangers responsible for maintaining Hadrian's Wall Path in the north of England.

- Maintenance: Some rangers perform regular maintenance on infrastructure or equipment such as fire rings as part of their duties — especially in preparing for winter closures and spring reopenings. Rangers are often the first to discover vandalism or weather-related damage to park roads, trails and campgrounds.
- Administration: In many cases administrative staff members are categorized officially as park rangers and may wear the distinct park ranger uniform while working "behind the scenes" to ensure the continued operation of the parks. These rangers may set policy for the parks, or handle park budgets, computers and technology, human resources, or other fields related to the administration of parks. In the case of management these positions are usually filled by individuals who have moved up from other field-based positions. These individuals are often heavily cross trained in order to allow for a knowledge of all other areas and duties under their authority.
- Combat wildlife poaching: The Sabah state government in Malaysia has recruited and trained local rangers to respond to real-time alerts, perform ad hoc operations, support investigations and wildlife conservation efforts to combat wildlife poaching, trafficking and illegal wildlife trade in Sabah.

== Worldwide deficit in developing countries ==
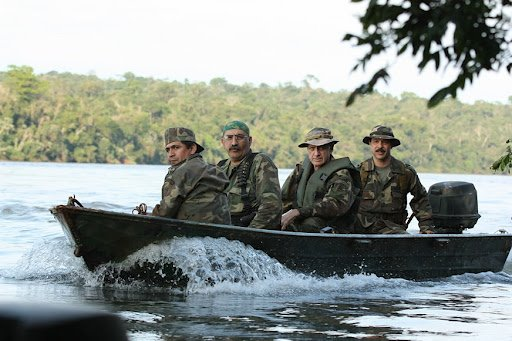
Park Rangers (guardaparques, in Spanish) patrolling in the Iguazú National Park in Argentina, on the border with Brazil and Paraguay

The Adopt A Ranger Foundation has calculated that worldwide about 150,000 rangers are needed for the protected areas in developing and transitioning countries. There is no data on how many rangers are employed at the moment, but probably less than half the protected areas in developing and transition countries have any rangers at all and those that have them are at least 50% short. This means that there would be a worldwide ranger deficit of 105,000 rangers in the developing and transition countries.

Dr. Kenton Miller, a former director general of the International Union for Conservation of Nature (IUCN), stated about the importance of rangers: "The future of our ecosystem services and our heritage depends upon park rangers. With the rapidity at which the challenges to protected areas are both changing and increasing, there has never been more of a need for well prepared human capacity to manage. Park rangers are the backbone of park management. They are on the ground. They work on the front line with scientists, visitors, and members of local communities."

Adopt A Ranger claims that the ranger deficit is the single greatest limiting factor in effectively protecting nature in 75% of the world. Currently, no conservation organization or Western country or international organization addresses this problem. Adopt A Ranger has been incorporated to draw worldwide public attention to the most urgent problem that conservation is facing in developing and transition countries: protected areas without field staff. Specifically, it will contribute to solving the problem by fund raising to finance rangers in the field. It will also help governments in developing and transition countries to assess realistic staffing needs and staffing strategies.

== In popular culture ==
In popular culture, a stereotype of American park rangers has been created by children's media such as the Yogi Bear cartoon series (Ranger Smith), as well as Disney's Ranger Woodlore and the anthropomorphic character Ranger Rick from the magazine of the same name.

Park rangers appear in Grand Theft Auto V in the form of the San Andreas Park Rangers.

== Movies featuring Rangers ==
- Akashinga: The Brave Ones
- Rhino Man
- The Elephant Whisperers
- We Are Guardians
- Virunga

== See also ==
- Park police
- Camera trap: for detecting which animals are present in an area
- Conservation officer
- Ecotourism in Africa
- Game warden
- Gunfire locator: locating of (illegal) hunting activity
- Preventive horn removal
- Hatching out eggs using an incubator
- Invasive species eradication
- Lumberjack
- Moving out ivory stockpiles (burning, sale, ...): increases park ranger safety
- Protected area
- Rewilding: reintroduction of lost native species (especially keystone species and predators) into an area
- Sea turtle hatcheries
- The Thin Green Line

== Sources ==
- "POSITION CLASSIFICATION STANDARD FOR PARK RANGER SERIES, GS-0025 (also "TS-75")" (PDF). Washington, D.C.: United States Office of Personnel Management. November 1985.
