= Black Mamba (group) =

Ugandan anti-terrorism organization

Black Mamba is a government anti-terrorism organization in Uganda, under President Yoweri Museveni.
