= Mamba (surname) =

Mamba is a surname. Notable people with the surname include:

- Alberto Mamba (born 1994), Mozambican middle-distance runner
- Manuel Mamba (born 1958), Filipino politician
- Mzwandile Mamba (born 1981), Swazi politician
- Ndumiso Mamba, Swazi government minister
- Priscilla Mamba (born 1972), Swazi long-distance runner
- Virginie Mamba (born 1980), Democratic Republic of the Congo handball player

== See also ==
- Hugo Mamba-Schlick (born 1982), Cameroonian triple jumper
