= Rhino Man =

Documentary film about rangers

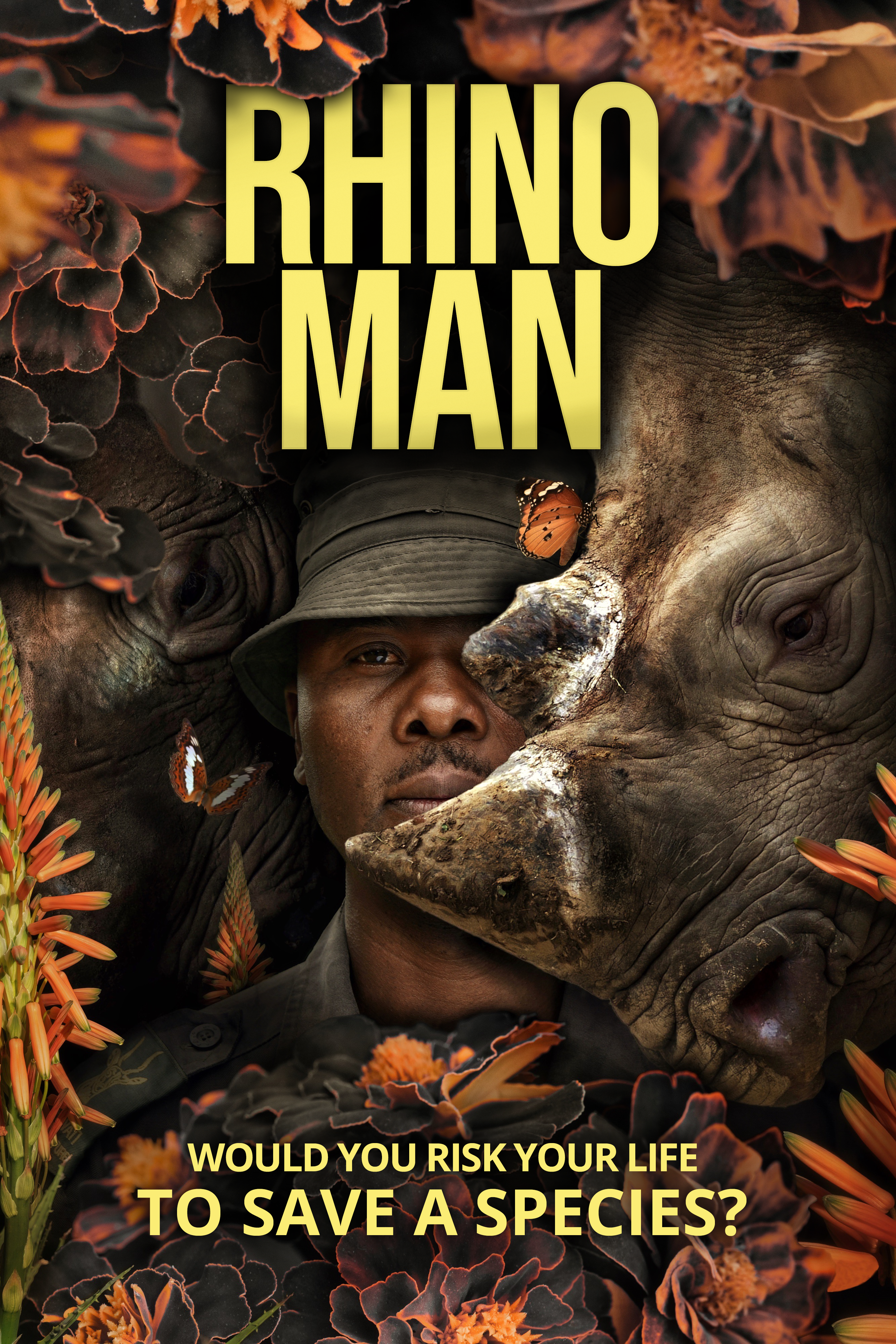
- Directed by: John Jurko II; Matt Lindenberg; Daniel Roberts
- Produced by: Matt Lindenberg; Justin Walker; John Jurko II
- Starring: Anton Mzimba; Martin Mthembu; Ruben De Kock; Marianne De Kock; William, Prince of Wales
- Cinematography: Nick Smith; John Jurko II
- Edited by: Jacob Ross; Cristian Lora Troncoso
- Music by: Simón Wilson
- Production companies: Global Conservation Corps; Friendly Human
- Release date: July 26, 2024
- Running time: 96 minutes
- Countries: United States; South Africa
- Languages: English; Xitsonga; Zulu; Afrikaans

Rhino Man is a feature-length documentary about South African field rangers protecting rhinos from poaching by crime syndicates. It's a film by the Global Conservation Corps produced by Friendly Human and directed by John Jurko II, Matt Lindenberg, and Daniel Roberts. It features the late, Anton Mzimba, the Head of Ranger Services at the Timbavati Private Nature Reserve, who was murdered in 2022 as the film was being completed.

== Background ==
With over 1,200 rhinos killed in a year, 2014 became the height of the rhino poaching crisis in South Africa. It was also the year the ranger trainer, Martin Mthembu, died in a car accident. Martin trained rangers during his life while working with his business partners, Ruben and Marianne De Kock, at the African Field Ranger Training Services, which became a part of the Southern African Wildlife College (SAWC).

Co-director Matt Lindenberg studied at the Southern African Wildlife College and trained rangers with Martin and Ruben. When Martin died, Matt began efforts to continue his work by founding the Global Conservation Corps in 2015. The organization's first project, Rhino Man, focused on documenting the stories of rangers.

== Production ==
The production of Rhino Man began in 2015 when South African conservationist, Matt Lindenberg of the Global Conservation Corps (GCC), partnered with Friendly Human, an Atlanta, Georgia based video production company.

From 2015 to 2018, the team made five trips to South Africa, capturing interviews and developing the story. In February 2018, John Jurko II took a position at Friendly Human. Two months later he began leading the completion of Rhino Man along with Matt.

In July 2018, Matt and John raised funds through GCC for a two week production trip to South Africa. On that trip they captured the ranger selection which appears in the film, along with additional footage of Anton Mzimba. They also met filmmaker Phillip Hattingh, who donated archival footage of the late Martin Mthembu.

In 2020, the Global Conservation Corps took full ownership of the project. John Jurko II flew to South Africa in March to further develop the storyline when he was locked down with Matt for nine months because of the COVID-19 pandemic.

The Rhino Man team partnered with composer Simón Wilson to create an original score for the film. In addition, they partnered with Sipho Mchunu and Mandisa Dlanga, two musical artists from Johnny Clegg's South African bands, Juluka and Savuka, respectively. Working with Sipho and Mandisa, they created Rhino Man's title track, "Who Will Step Up?"

== Anton Mzimba murder ==
On the night of July 26, 2022, after months of threats, Anton Mzimba, was gunned down at his home in front of his family. The killers also shot Anton's wife in the stomach, and took shots at his children. Anton died on the way to the hospital due to his wounds. His wife made a full recovery. No one has been arrested for his murder as of August 27, 2024.

Anton's murder occurred as the production of Rhino Man was nearing completion. The GCC team organized a fundraiser to support his family and future conservation education opportunities by creating the Anton Mzimba Education Trust (AMET).

Following this event, Rhino Man gained the attention of Prince William, Prince of Wales, who previously spoke with Anton in November 2021. Eight months later, when Anton was murdered, Prince William tweeted, "I'm deeply saddened to learn of the killing of Anton Mzimba who I spoke to in November...Those responsible must swiftly be brought to justice." Soon after John Jurko II and Matt Lindenberg were invited to the United for Wildlife Global Summit in London, where they spoke about the loss of Anton and his story encapsulated within the movie.

== Premieres ==
Rhino Man had its world premiere at a private screening with Prince William of Wales and Duchess Sophie of Edinburgh hosted by the Prince's organization United for Wildlife, a program of The Royal Foundation. This took place on June 13, 2023 at the Cinema in the Battersea Power Station, London to an audience of 150 officials from finance, transportation, law enforcement, and NGOs working together to combat illegal wildlife trade. Orlat Ndlovu, who took Anton Mzimba's place as the Head of Ranger Services at the Timbavati Private Nature Reserve, spoke to the audience about the loss of Anton and the continued efforts of the rangers in the face of threats to their lives.

On the 25th of September 2023, Rhino Man hosted a pre-release screening at the 2023 Jackson Wild Media Awards. The film was also selected as a finalist in the categories of Conservation Long - Form and People & Nature.

On the 2nd of March 2024, Rhino Man had its festival premiere at the Boulder International Film Festival at the Adventure Pavilion in Grace Commons church.

The Rhino Man team organized a four-city international premiere tour with the rangers starting in Hoedspruit, South Africa on the 13th of June 2024. They continued on to present at screenings in NYC, Toronto, and Atlanta.

Rhino Man released on Apple TV, Google Play, and Vimeo on Demand on the 26th of July 2024 to commemorate the 2nd anniversary of the death of Anton Mzimba. One week later on the 2nd of August 2024, Rhino Man was released on Amazon Prime Video to commemorate the 10th year anniversary of the death of Martin Mthembu.

== Awards and nominations ==
- 2024 - Wildscreen: Nominated for a Panda Award in the Impact Category
- 2024 - New Media Film Festival: Winner of Best Socially Responsible Film
- 2024 - Arizona International Film Festival: Winner of Special Jury Award for Activist Filmmaking
- 2024 - Memorial Maria Luísa International Nature Photo and Video Contest: Winner of Best Environmental Documentary
- 2023 - Jackson Wild Media Awards: Finalist in categories of Conservation Long - Form and People & Nature
- 2023 - African Conservation Awards: Winner of Best Conservation Supporter
