= Mani Spinx =

- Born: Mads Peter Brøbech Jørgensen; 31 July 1975 (age 51)
- Origin: Silkeborg, Denmark
- Genres: Multiple
- Occupations: Musician, artist
- Instrument: Multi-instrumentalist
- Label: Warner Music
- Website: www.manispinx.com

Mani Spinx (born Mads Brøbech Jørgensen; 31 July 1975) is a solo-artist, producer and songwriter. Mani Spinx released his highly critically acclaimed debut album Post Modern Panic Attack in 2006. Mani Spinx has supported big international acts such as The Sounds and Gnarls Barkley.

The Mani Spinx song "Last Night in America" features American guitar-player Peter Stroud who has been lead-guitarist with Sheryl Crow for many years.

== Art ==
Besides being a musician Mani Spinx is also an illustrator and painter who makes cartoons/drawings/paintings for magazines and CD inlay-covers. Mani Spinx does most of his own artwork, but has also worked with fx the Danish artist Anika Lori who made the cover for his debut album. David Shrigley also made a mini poster to advertise the release of a Mani Spinx album. Spinx has done commercial artwork for companies like Diesel and Psycho Cowboy, and has also done charity campaigns for Save The Children raising money for reception centres for former child soldiers in Uganda.

== Acting ==
Mani Spinx has acted in a Theatre-concert directed by famous Danish actor and instructor Lars Kaalund. The show was built upon Mani Spinx' own songs and was set at the Gasværket theatre in Copenhagen. Throughout 2009 - 2011 Spinx acted on stage in the world's first officially endorsed The Beatles theatre-concert by Nikolaj Cederholm.

Mani Spinx has instructed several music and art-videos and is also a remixer for bands such as Are We Brothers? and Nelson Can.

Mani Spinx was a talented football (soccer) player in his early youth, but decided to go for a career in music instead. He taught himself to play guitar at age 14. Today Mani Spinx plays multiple instruments both in the studio and on stage.

== Discography ==
=== Albums ===
- Post Modern Panic Attack (2006)
- Paper Cuts EP (2007)
- Black Mamba (2008)
- Cry Candy Cry (2010)
- Cry Candy Cry (Vinyl Bonus Tracks) EP (2010)

=== Singles ===
- "Last Night in America" (2006)
- "Smoke a Flower" (2006)
- "How Do You Want It?" (2007)
- "All Right" (2007)
- "Rock n Roll Randsom" (2007)
- "Make a Nice Man" (2008)
- "I'm with You" (2008)
- "The Underground" (2008)
- "C'mon" (2008)
- "Goodbye My Love" (2009)
- "True" (2010)
- "Broken Windows" (2010)
- "Calvin's Song" (2010)
