= Wildlife Justice Commission =

International wildlife NGO

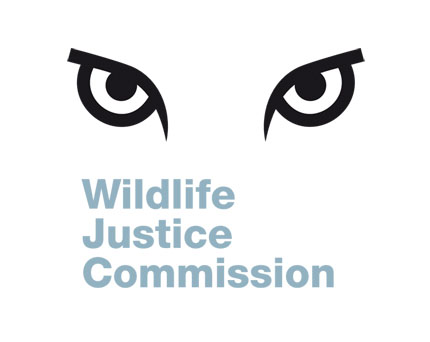
- Founded: 3 March 2015
- Type: Non-Profit Foundation
- Website: wildlifejustice.org

The Wildlife Justice Commission (WJC) is an international non-governmental organisation established in 2015 and headquartered in The Hague, the Netherlands. Operating worldwide, its mission is to disrupt and dismantle organised transnational criminal networks involved in the illegal trade of wildlife, fish, and timber. The WJC conducts intelligence-led investigations to gather evidence, which it shares with law enforcement to facilitate arrests and secure convictions.

== Mission and scope ==
The Wildlife Justice Commission (WJC) supports the arrest and prosecution of high-level traffickers and works to dismantle the criminal networks that purchase, transport, and sell wildlife products. Its law enforcement approach includes the use of undercover operatives, intelligence analysis to identify suspects, and the publication of briefings and reports to strengthen the global knowledge base. The organisation also shares intelligence with governments to enhance enforcement efforts. Beyond operational support, the WJC collaborates with governments and law enforcement agencies to ensure wildlife crime is treated as a priority. It also engages with policymakers, intergovernmental bodies, and civil society to advance wildlife justice and promote long-term solutions.

The WJC’s mission is to strip the profit from trafficking in wildlife, fish, and timber by exposing perpetrators, ensuring they face prosecution, and assisting authorities in seizing illegal shipments.

== Achievements ==
WJC law enforcement efforts have led to 18 convictions, with a further 28 cases pending in court.

== Funding ==
The WJC funding comes primarily from lotteries, foundation grants and individual donations.
