= Anti-poaching =

Organized activities to combat the illegal poaching of wildlife

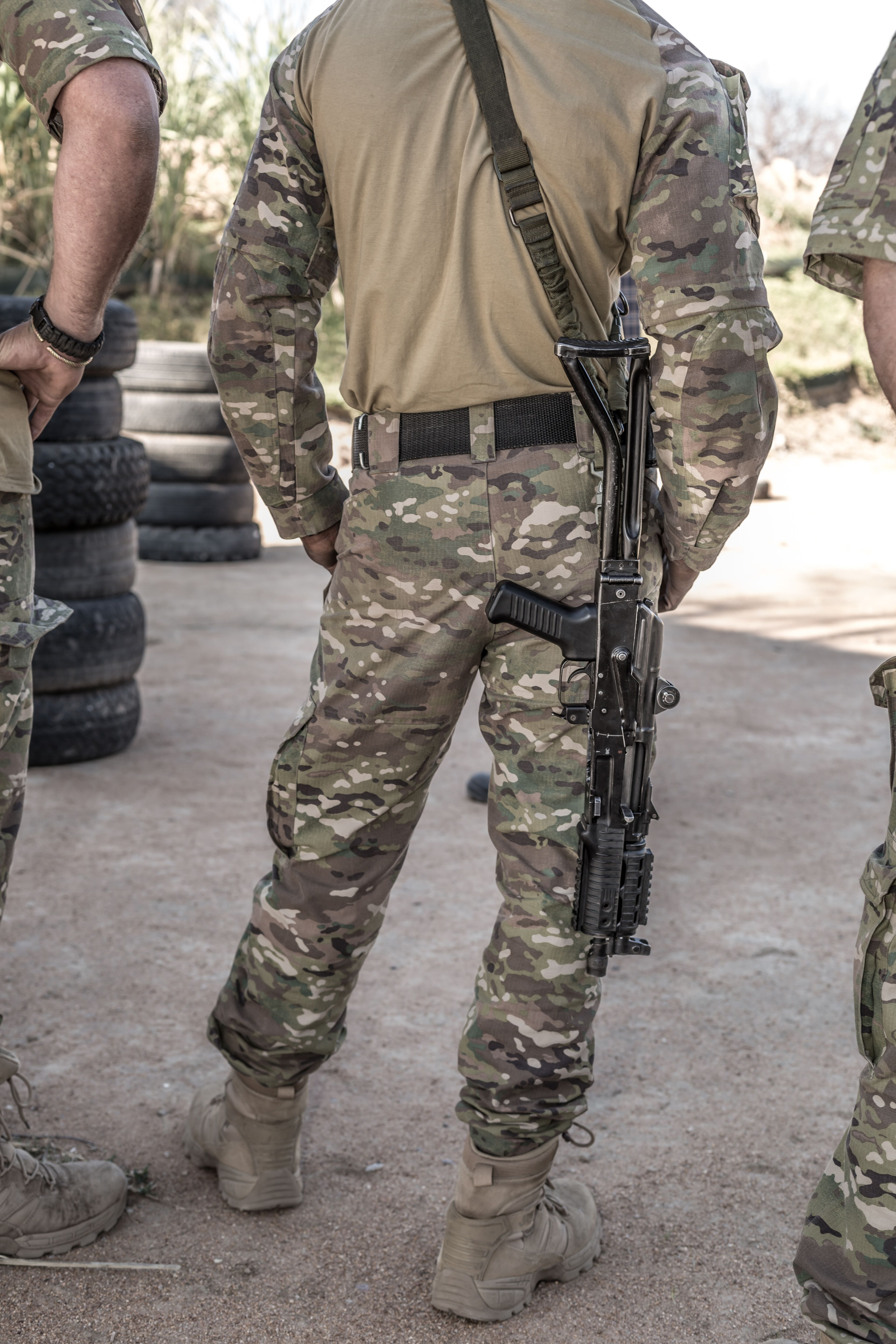
Armed anti-poaching ranger among squad members

Anti-poaching is the organised act to counter the poaching of wildlife. However, it is generally used to describe an overall effort against the illegal wildlife trade. The act of anti-poaching is normally carried out by national parks on public land and by private security companies on privately owned land. Anti-poaching takes many forms and depends mainly upon the habitat being protected. Typically, it is the act of actively patrolling land in an effort to prevent poachers from reaching the animals.

== Rangers ==
The most basic level of anti-poaching is the on-site rangers. They are thought of as the first line of defence against the illegal wildlife trade. Rangers typically form squads, usually four men, filling complementary roles. These roles vary depending on the sophistication of the squads. In most situations, rangers are equipped with the bare necessities; a firearm, and a simple uniform. However, in recent times due to the popularity of wildlife protection many organisations have been able to obtain the funding to equip their rangers.

Rangers perform varied tasks in their daily duties. Patrols make up the majority of a ranger's time. Different organisations adopt different strategies to patrols, which are typically based on the animals under their protection. Rangers only protecting a few animals may be tasked with protecting one per squad. This only occurs for large mammals as generally other animals are difficult to track each new day; to make this task easier tracking devices are employed. For smaller animals, or to protect all animals in a given area rangers patrol the boundaries of the area.

== Technology ==
Technology is important to most anti-poaching groups as they are used as a force multiplier to protect large areas with only a small employ. A broad array of technological solutions has been trialed particularly in private game reserves and the Kruger National Park. Camera traps are commonly used throughout the world by rangers as a way to monitor wildlife and detect poacher presence. These provide critical post-hoc data to understand poaching routes and intensity; however increasingly in recent times they are deployed as connected units to provide real-time updates from the protected areas to ranger units.

== Military operations ==
The British Army launched Operation Corded in 2018 to provide support to rangers and anti-poaching programs in Southern Africa.

== Notable anti-poaching organisations ==
The Kenya Wildlife Service (KWS) is a Kenyan state corporation that was established in 1989 to conserve and manage Kenya's wildlife. It is established under an Act of Parliament Cap 376 (The Wildlife Conservation and Management (Amendment 1989) Act) with the mandate to conserve and manage wildlife in Kenya, and to enforce related laws and regulations. It manages the biodiversity of the country, protecting and conserving the flora and fauna.

The Sea Shepherd Conservation Society (SSCS) is a non-profit, marine conservation organization based in the United States however operating globally throughout International waters to prevent illegal fishing and whaling. The tactics of Sea Shepherd have been opposed, even by some who denounce whaling, such as Greenpeace.
