= International Anti-Poaching Foundation =

Environmental organization in Australia

- Founded: 2009
- Founder: Damien Mander
- Type: Not-For-Profit
- Purpose: Conservation
- Location: Africa
- Website: www.IAPF.org

Akashinga, (formerly the International Anti-Poaching Foundation (IAPF)) is a non-profit organisation registered in Australia, predominantly operating on the African continent. The group initially created a structured military-like approach to conservation, employing tactics and technology generally reserved for the modern-day battlefield, and has since moved to a community oriented approach. This has included the training of local women as rangers.

== History ==
The organisation was founded by Damien Mander, after a trip to Africa where he intended to use his naval experience for conservation. He observed the problems that front-line rangers and wildlife experienced, and founded the IAPF in 2009.

In 2010, the TV program 60 Minutes filmed IAPF operations in Victoria Falls, Zimbabwe, which focused on conservation efforts for the black rhinoceros. In 2012, 60 Minutes then filmed the IAPF using unmanned drones in Mozambique's Niassa National Reserve.

In 2015 the IAPF transitioned away from military tactics towards community-oriented strategies for their anti-poaching work, attempting to incentivize locals to join the conservation effort. Part of this effort was to train women to become rangers, helping both wildlife conservation and women empowerment efforts. The first program that the IAPF set up for women was Akashinga in the Lower Zambezi Valley and Phundundu, Zimbabwe. The initial outreach for candidates focused on "victims of sexual assault or domestic violence; who were single mothers or abandoned wives; or who were Aids orphans", according to the BBC.

They have also set up training programs for women in South Africa. Over its first year, the female anti-poaching unit was able to make about 70 arrests over the first year. 60 Minutes filmed for a third time in 2018, covering the Akashinga program in Zimbabwe's Lower Zambezi Valley, which is the first nature reserve in the world to be managed and protected by women. Jane Goodall was a patron of the organization.

== Operations ==
IAPF operates an anti-poaching unit, protecting the breeding program of black rhinos on the Stanley & Livingstone Private Game Reserve. No rhinos have been killed during the time IAPF has operated there. IAPF also provides free training in Zimbabwe for rangers. The IAPF's rangers are taught skills including ambush, patrolling, arrest, crime scene preservation, and camouflage and concealment.

Some skills are an adaptation of military courses, adjusted to suit conservation efforts. Some convicted poachers have been rehabilitated and sent out to work as rangers. In South Africa the IAPF co-developed of the nation's Anti-Poaching Ranger qualification standard.

== IAPF recognition ==
In 2013, three nominations at The Humane Society of the United States' 28th annual Genesis Award covered the IAPF.
