= LensCulture =

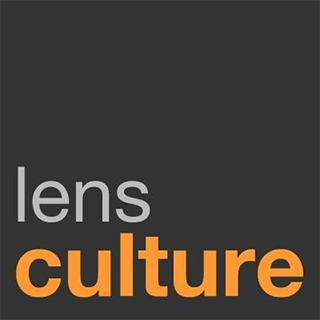
- Website type: Online Magazine
- Founded: 2004
- Editor: Jim Casper
- Industry: Photography
- Website: www.lensculture.com
- OCLC number: 439727151

LensCulture is a photography network and online magazine about contemporary photography in art, media, politics, commerce and popular cultures worldwide. It is based in Amsterdam, Netherlands.

LensCulture sponsors international photography awards and grants several times per year, as well as traveling exhibitions of photography. It published its first publication, The Best of LensCulture, Volume 1, in 2017.

== Management ==
The organization was founded in 2004 by its editor Jim Casper, who moved its editorial offices to Paris from Berkeley in 2005. As of 2018, its staff is spread across Amsterdam, Berkeley, California and other locations around the world.

== Reception ==
Will Coldwell, writing in The Independent in 2013, described LensCulture as one of the ten best photography websites, calling it a "definitive resource for anyone who wants to keep up with the latest trends and debates in contemporary photography." Critic Sean O'Hagan, writing in The Guardian in 2012, listed it among the eight best photography websites or online publications, calling it "one of the most authoritative and wide-ranging sites."

== Awards and grants ==
The 2014 Exposure Awards exhibition was held at London College of Communication, University of the Arts London. More recent exhibitions include ones held at Photo London, SF Camerawork, The Photographers' Gallery, Klompching Gallery, and more. Furthermore, award-winners have been screened at the Voies Off Festival at Rencontres d'Arles in Arles, France 2014.

=== LensCulture Exposure Awards winners ===
- 2009: Portfolio Category - grand prize, Marco Vernaschi. Single Image Category - grand prize, Brad Moore; second prize, Stella Johnson; third prize, Laura Pannack
- 2010: Portfolio Category - grand prize, Jessica Hines; second prize, Carolle Benitah; third prize, Louisa Marie Summer. Single Image Category - grand prize, Martine Fougeron; second prize, Albertina d'Urso; third prize, Anne Berry
- 2011: Portfolio Category - grand prize, Michael Marten; second prize, Rachelle Mozman; third prize, Jody Ake. Multimedia Category - grand prize, Olga Kravets, Maria Morina, and Oksana Yushko; second prize, Florence Royer; third prize, Markel Redondo. Single Image Category - grand prize, Kerry Mansfield; second prize, S. Gayle Stevens; third prize, Andrey Ivanov-Eftimiopulos and Sasha Shikhova
- 2012: Portfolio Category - grand prize, Kyoko Hamada; second prize, Annalisa Brambilla; third prize, Matilde Gattoni. Multimedia Category - grand prize, Amanda Zackem; second prize, Ed Kashi; third prize, Elena Bulygina. Single Image Category - grand Prize, Jim Kazanjian; second prize, Michelle Sank; third prize, Andrea Stultiens
- 2013: Portfolio Category - first prize, David Favrod; second prize, Yijun Liao; third prize, Richard Tuschman. Single Image Category - first prize, Chee Keong Lim; second prize, Julia Gunther; third prize, Zoran Marinovic
- 2017: Series Category - first place, Elena Anosova; second place, Areg Balayan; third place, Antoine Bruy. Single Image Category - first place, Jonathan Bachman; second place, Susan Copen Oken; third place, Sandra Mehl.
- 2020: Series Category - first place, Agnieszka Sosnowska; second place, Enayat Asadi; third place, Alex Vasyliev. Single Image Category - first place, Oye Diran; second place, Majid Khaleghi Moghaddam; third place, Justin Keene.

=== LensCulture Portrait Awards winners ===
- 2014: Portfolio Category: first prize, Marius Schultz; second prize, Hossein Fatemi; third prize, Tsutomu Yamagata. Single Image Category: first prize, Clare Benson; second prize, Marc Thirouin; third prize, Ulrik Tofte.
- 2018: Series category: first place, Robin de Puy; second place, Adam Ferguson; third place, Bruce Polin. Singles category: first place, Kremer Johnson; second place, Peter Zelewski; third place, Juul Kraijer.
- 2021: Series category: first place, Oded Wagenstein; second place, Lina Geoushy; third place, Alberto Giuliani. Singles category: first place, Lauren Forster; second place, Kristina Varaksina; third place, Vanessa Leroy.
- 2025: Series category: first place, Daesung Lee; second place, Jan Banning; third place, Barbara Peacock. Singles category: first place, Emily Neville Fisher; second place, Kat Green; third place, Slava Pirsky. Jurors’ picks: Hannah Mittelstaedt, Magnus Laupa, Niccolò Rastrelli, Shin Ono, Kyle Lui, Majid Farahani, Stefanie Langenhoven, Sander Vos Finalists: Alejandro Martinez, Breana Helders, Frederic Aranda, Janelle Lynch, Kevin Smith, Maryam Firuzi, Nancy Borowick, Sabrina Santiago, Yuliya Germanovich, André Ramos-Woodard, Brian Hodges, Giovana Schlüter Nunes, Jon Cospito, Leon Foggitt, Melissa Ann Pinney, Olivier Lavenac, Sasha Maslov, Boris Joseph, Eliza Bell Schweizbach, Hanna Wolf, Josefine Rauch, Lorraine Turci, Muir Vidler, Piotr Skubisz, Toby Binder.

=== LensCulture Street Photography Awards winners ===
- 2017: Series category: first place, Hakan Simsek; second place, Alberte A Pereira; third place, Antonio Privitera. Single Image category: first place, Moin Ahmed; second place, Artyt Lerdrakmongkol; third place, Ilan Burla.
- 2018: Series category: first place, Sowrav Das; second place, İlker Karaman; third place, Cocoa Laney. Single Image category: first place, Maciej Dakowicz; second place, Barry Talis; third place, Jingsheng Nie.
- 2019: Series category: First-place, Kevin Fletcher; second-place, Toby Rinder; third-place, Michael McIlvaney. Single Image category: first-place, Gabi Ben Avraham; second-place, Stuart Paton. Finalists: Barry Talis, Elizabeth Brooks, Cyrus Cornut, Hugo de Melo, Dougie Wallace, Laird Kay, Moises Levy, and Sebastian Steveniers.

=== LensCulture Emerging Talent Awards winners ===
- 2016: Jurors' picks: Weronika Gesicka, Yoshikatsu Fujii, Wiktoria Wojciechowska, Ben Thomas, Gesche Würfel, Johnny Miller, Tine Poppe, Zachary Roberts.
- 2017: Jurors' picks: Aleksi Poutanen, Thomas Freteur, Giovanna Petrocchi, Turjoy Chowdhury, Matthew Genitempo, J Fredric May, Michael Vince Kim, Daren You.
- 2018: Jurors' picks: Aaron Vincent Elkaim, Diego Moreno, Leah Kennedy, Alice Mann, Bastard Turpin, Barbara Peacock, Ronghui Chen, Marta Blue. General category: Adrian Hoellger, Alex Vasyliev, Ana Vallejo, Andrew O'Carroll, Anna Reivilä, Camille Gharbi, Camilo Leon-Quijano, Charles Xelot, Dean West, Dominique Teufen, Ezra Acayan, Fiona Struengmann, Gabriel Romero, George Marazakis, Giorgio Negro, Gwen Solomon, Hakim Boulouiz, Hashem Shakeri, Ilias Lois, Isabella Ståhl, Jill Booker, Joel Jimenez, Julie Beauchemin, Keisuke Togawa, Leah Schretenthaler, Lena Gudd, Louise Amelie & Aljaž Fuis, Luciana De Donato, Mélanie Wenger, Mia Collis, Milad Safabakhsh, Nanna Keitmann, Oded Wagenstein, Paul Shiakallis, Sanni Saarinen, Sebastian Sardi, Shahab Naseri, Tadas Kazakevicius, Tamar Granovsky, Ty Stedman, Yoshi Hase, Yurian Quintanas Nobel.
- 2019: Jurors' picks: Hajar Benjida, Silvia De Giorgi, Terra Fondriest, Matei Focseneanu, Jon Henry, Felipe Jacome, Guanyu Xu, Marvel Harris. General category: Rafael Heygster, Denelle and Tom Ellis, Jana Sophia Nolle, Brendon Kahn, Karoliina Paatos, Julie Poly, Max Miechowski, Azad Amin, Marcus Desieno, Daniel Szalai, Greg Turner, Todd Antony, Vikram Kushwah, Simon Lehner, Bowei Yang, Juan Brenner, Soraya Zaman.

=== LensCulture Art Photography Awards ===
The Art Photography Awards were held in 2018, 2019, 2021, and 2023.

=== Critics' Choice ===
- 2020: For the inaugural Critics' Choice award, 20 critics selected three personal favourites, resulting in 48 winners.

The Critics' Choice award was held in 2023, 2024 and 2025.

==== LensCulture Summer Open Awards winners ====
- 2022: Winners: Adetona Omokanye, Andrew Kung, Chantal Pinzi, Debe Arlook, Emma Sarpaniemi, Gil Bartz, John T Pedersen, Jon Feinstein, K Young, Laura Chen, Ken Buslay, Christoph Morlinghaus, Maria Plotnikova, Sahar Hasanzadeh, Shane Rocheleau, Sue Palmer Stone, Spiros Zervoudakis, Takako Kido, Synchrodogs, Zhou Chengzhou.
