= David Goodsell =

American structural biologist and scientific illustrator

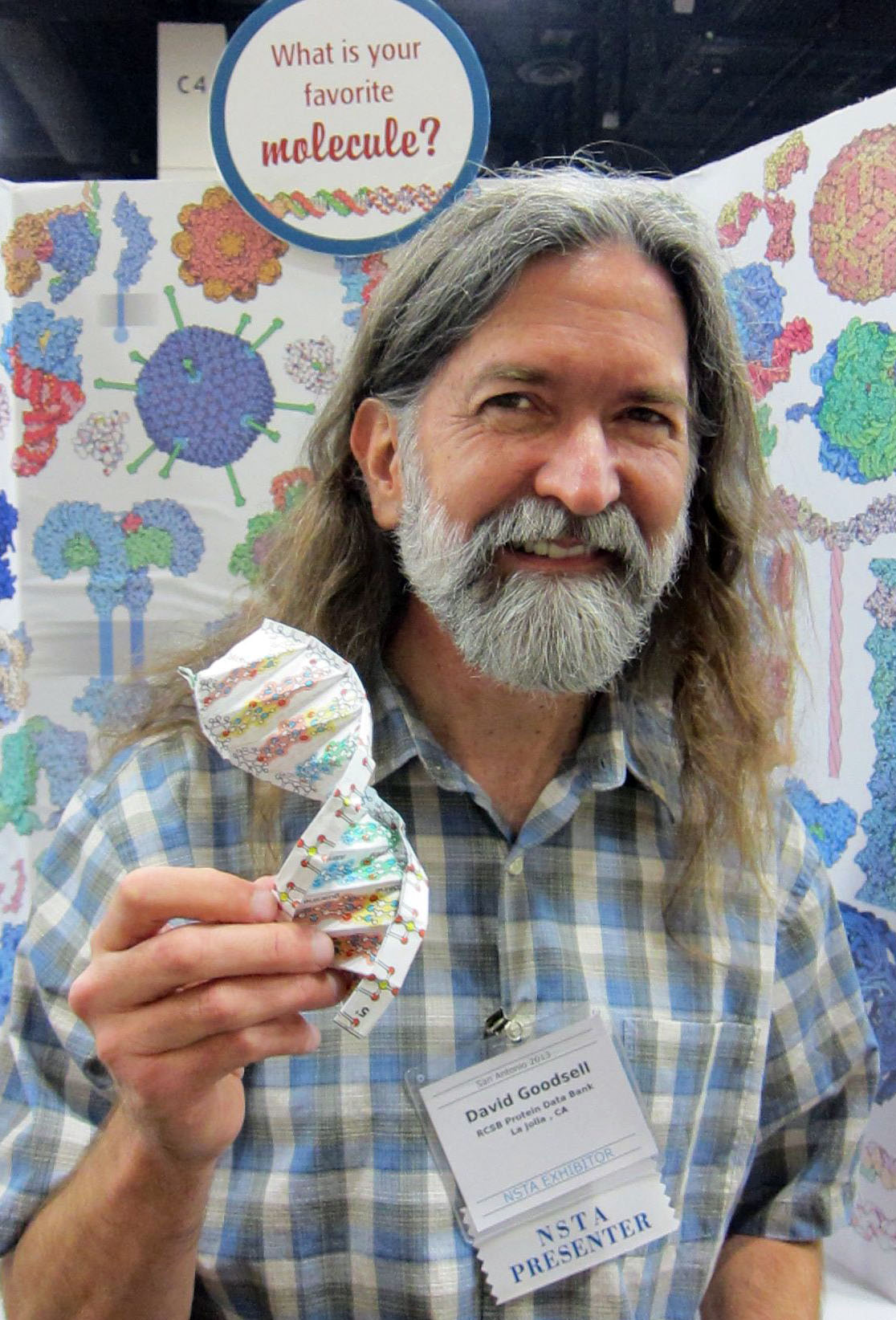
- Born: 1961 (age 64–65); Honolulu, Hawaii, U.S.
- Education: UC Irvine (BSc, 1982); UCLA (PhD, 1987)
- Known for: Scientific illustration; Watercolor cell landscapes; PDB's of Molecule of the Month
- Awards: Wellcome Image Award (2016); Carl Branden Award (2022); I. Fankuchen Award (2022)
- Scientific career
- Fields: Structural biology
- Institutions: Scripps Research Institute; Rutgers University; Protein Data Bank
- Thesis: X-ray crystallography of nucleic acids (1987)

David S. Goodsell is an American scientific illustrator and biologist who is an associate professor at the Scripps Research Institute and research professor at Rutgers University, New Jersey (dual appointment). Goodsell is especially well known for his watercolor paintings of cell interiors, and for the creation of an enormous repertoire of educational resources as the founder of RSCB Protein Data Bank's Molecule of the Month.

== Career and research ==
Goodsell obtained a Bachelor's of Science in both biology and chemistry from the University of California Irvine in 1982. After this, he completed a PhD in X-ray crystallography of DNA at the University of California Los Angeles in 1987. Since completing his PhD he has worked as a structural biologist at the Scripps Research Institute (with a 2-year period in University of California in 1992–94).

His research topics have included the use of structural biology and molecular dynamic simulations to investigate symmetry in protein oligomers, protein–protein interactions and for computer-aided drug design. In particular he is a developer of AutoDock, the most widely used program used for molecular docking. His main research focus areas are HIV drug resistance and structure and function of bacterial cells.

Goodsell's illustrations are frequently used as teaching tools, in textbooks, in scientific publications, and as journal cover art. In graduate school, Goodsell became interested in scientific illustration while writing molecular graphics programs to visualize protein and DNA structures. His images of individual proteins are typically computer generated, cell-shaded space-filling representations of proteins, often with cut-aways to show internal binding sites and cofactors.

By contrast, Goodsell's watercolor paintings of cell interiors illustrate various dense molecular landscapes, which feature common cellular processes such as synaptic transmission, cytoskeletal remodeling, and viral uptake. Goodsell's artwork typically depicts a molecular snapshot of the inside of a cell, filled with highly simplified protein structures in a approachable style in order to capture overall organization of intracellular protein complexes without overwhelming detail.

Goodsell's cell interiors are often displayed at an effective 1,000,000x magnification for consistency. The paintings therefore share a consistent style, aiming to make interpretation easy and as intuitive as possible. Many of his illustrations are published in the "Molecule of the Month" series by the Protein Data Bank (PDB), an archive of protein structures.

== Illustration ==
=== Process ===
For individual proteins, Goodsell's illustrations are directly generated from solved protein structures deposited in the PDB using custom computer renderings that he wrote in Fortran (now released as an online illustration tool). Representations of large macromolecular complexes or crowded cellular environments require interpretation and synthesis of multiple different types of scientific imaging. These include X-ray crystallography and NMR for protein components, cryo electron tomography for larger complexes, and super-res light microscopy and electron microscopy for the cellular environment. In these cases, the focus is on portraying the relative scales, orientations and interactions between the components.

Animations by David Goodsell
Animation of the small subunit of the Thermus thermophilus ribosome. RNA shown in orange, protein in blue.

Animation shows the multiple rotational states of bacterial ATP synthase, which have been revealed by cryoelectron microscopy.

Animation of the large subunit of the Haloarcula marismortui ribosome. RNA shown in orange, protein in blue.

Animation shows the allosteric motion of hemoglobin, with heme shown in red and oxygen shown in blue.

== Gallery ==
Molecular Landscapes by David S. Goodsell

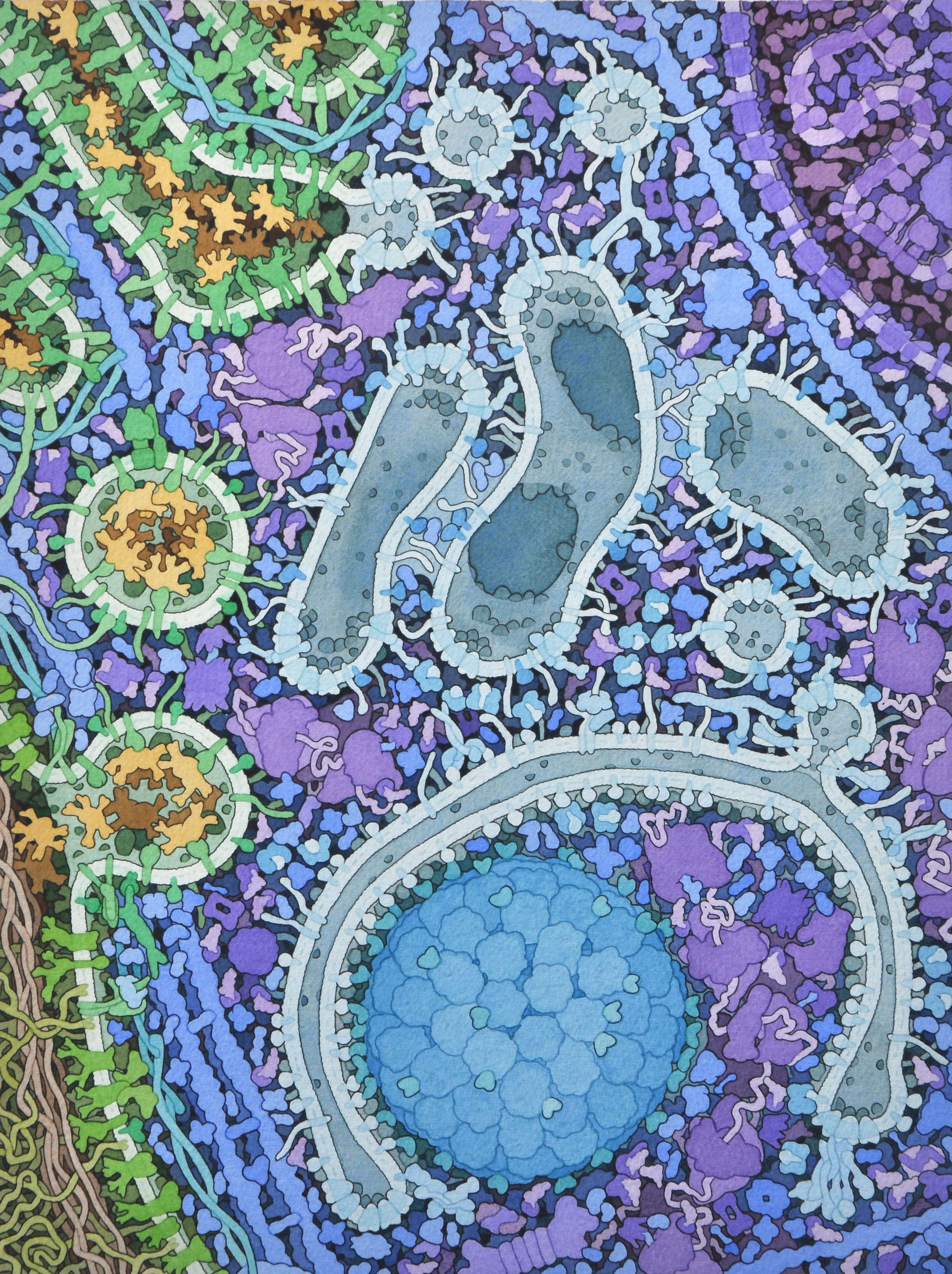

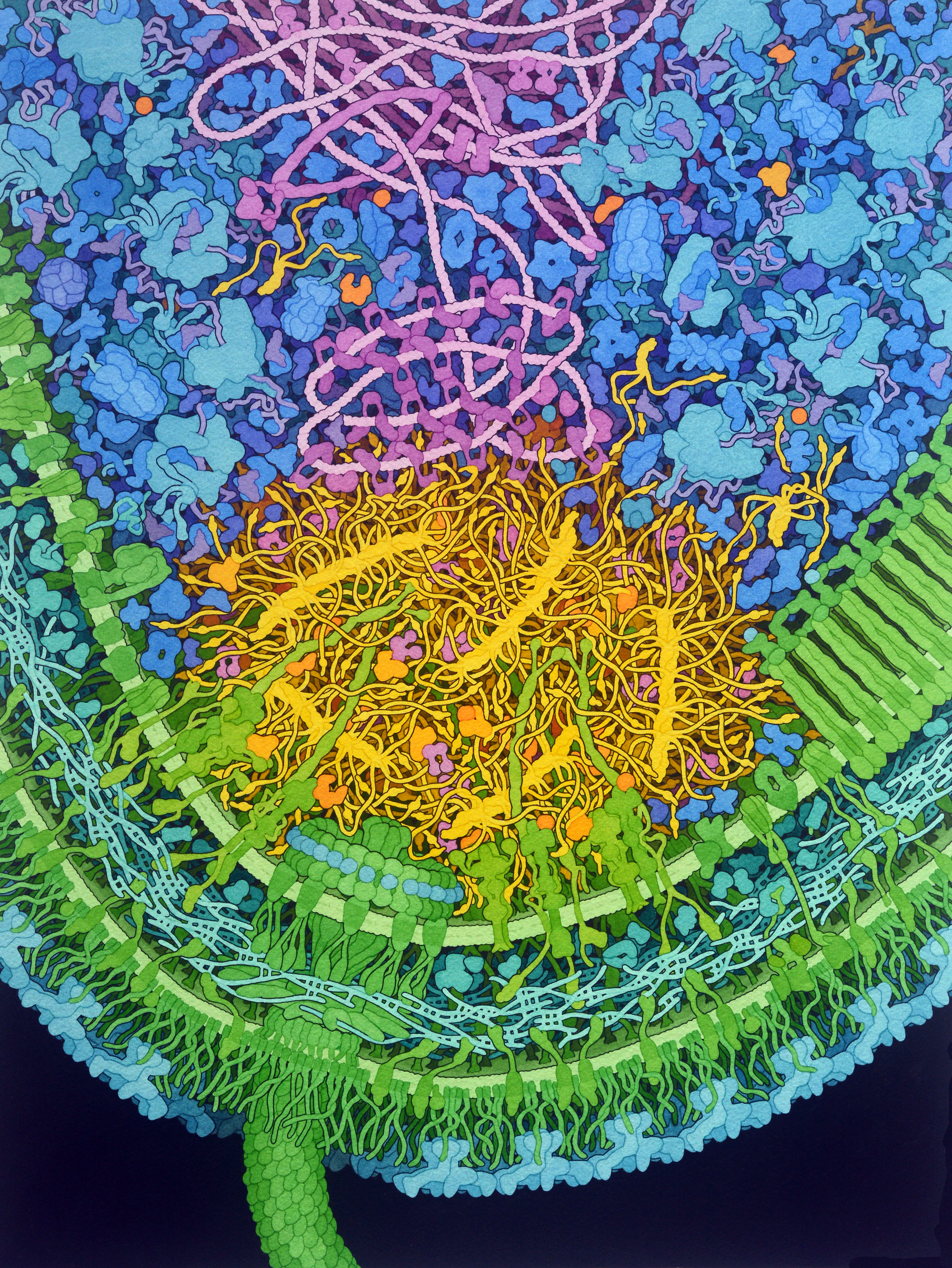

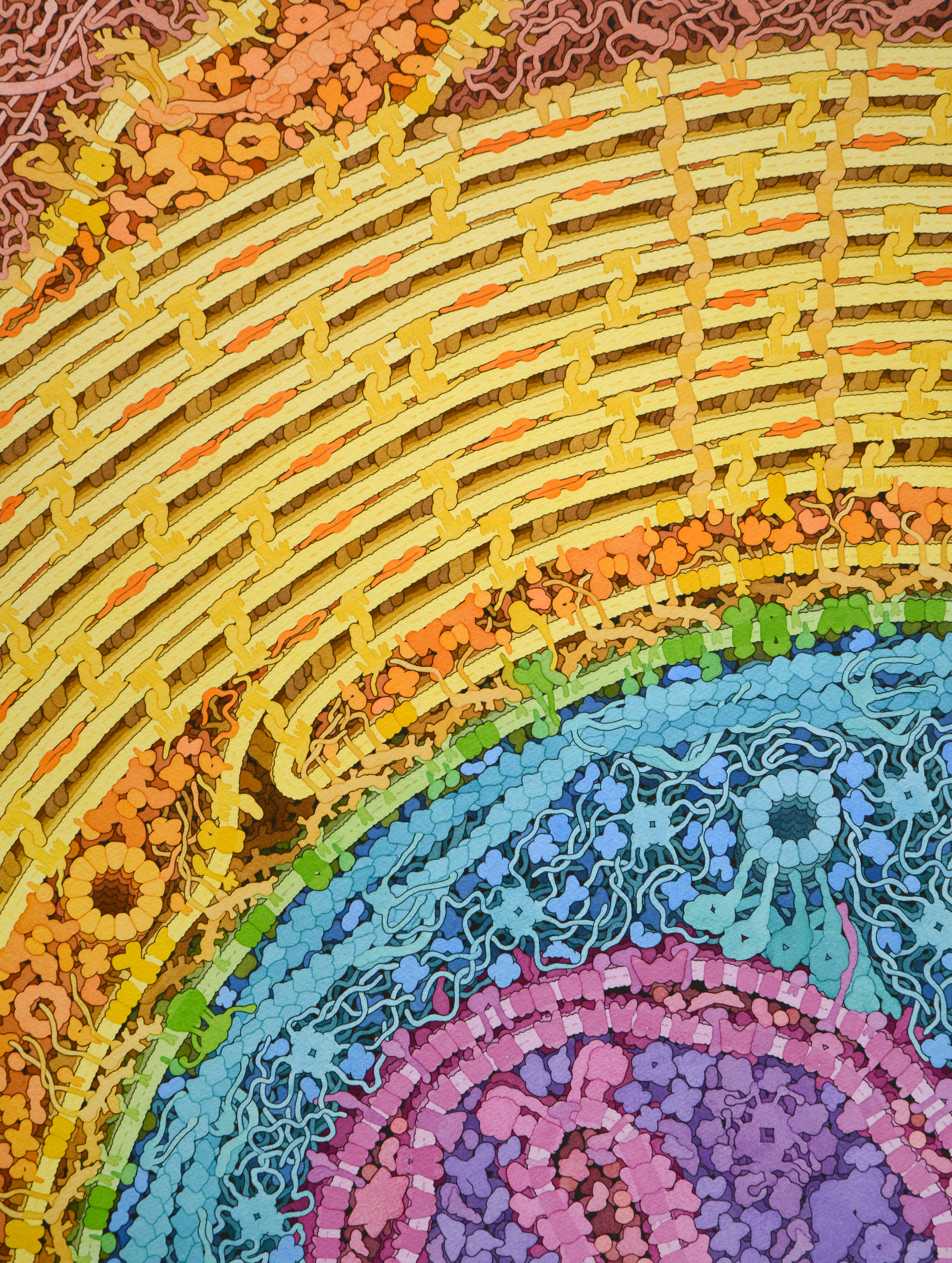
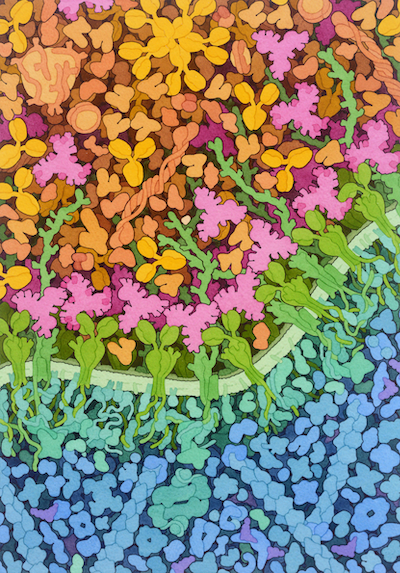

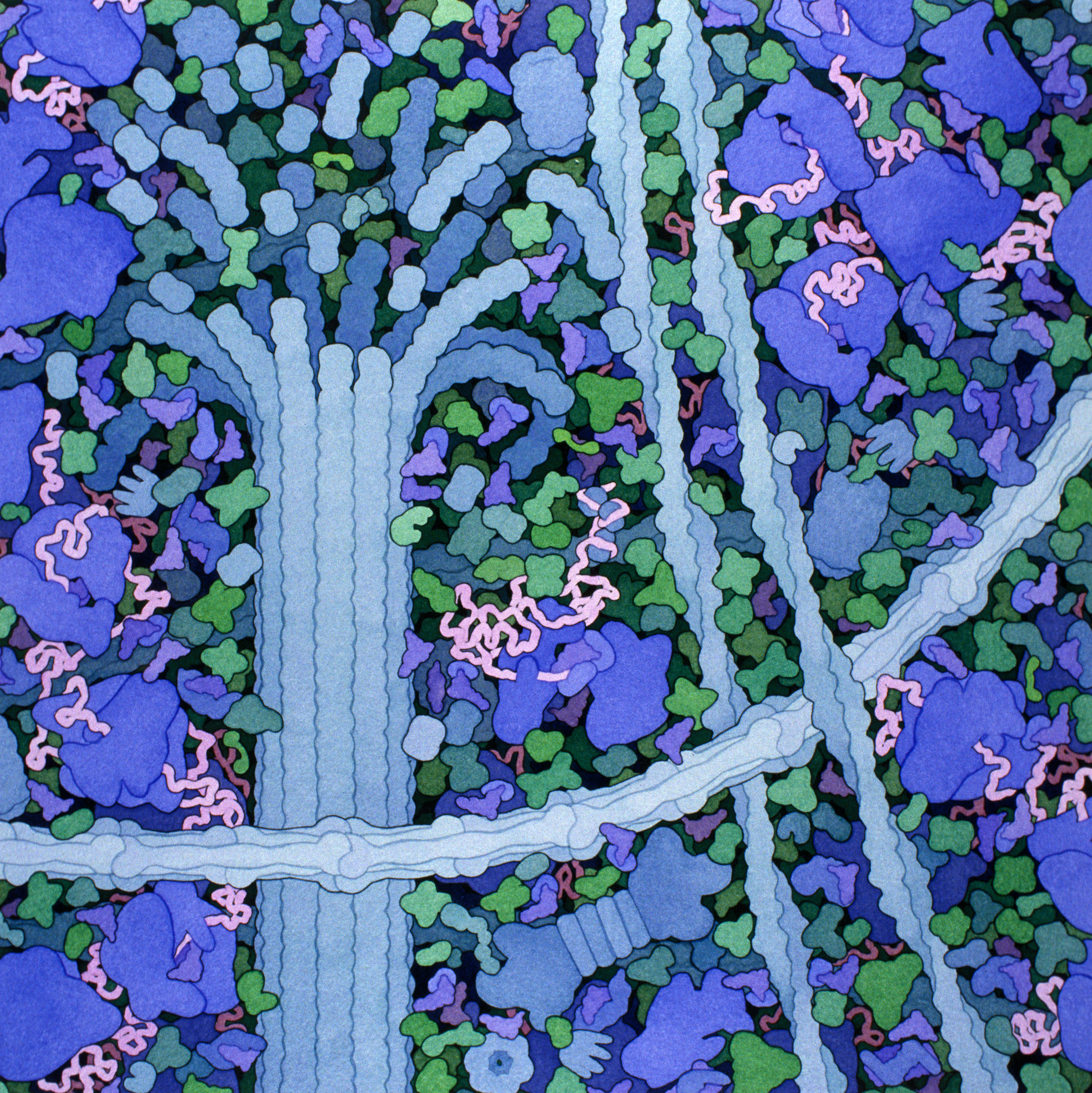

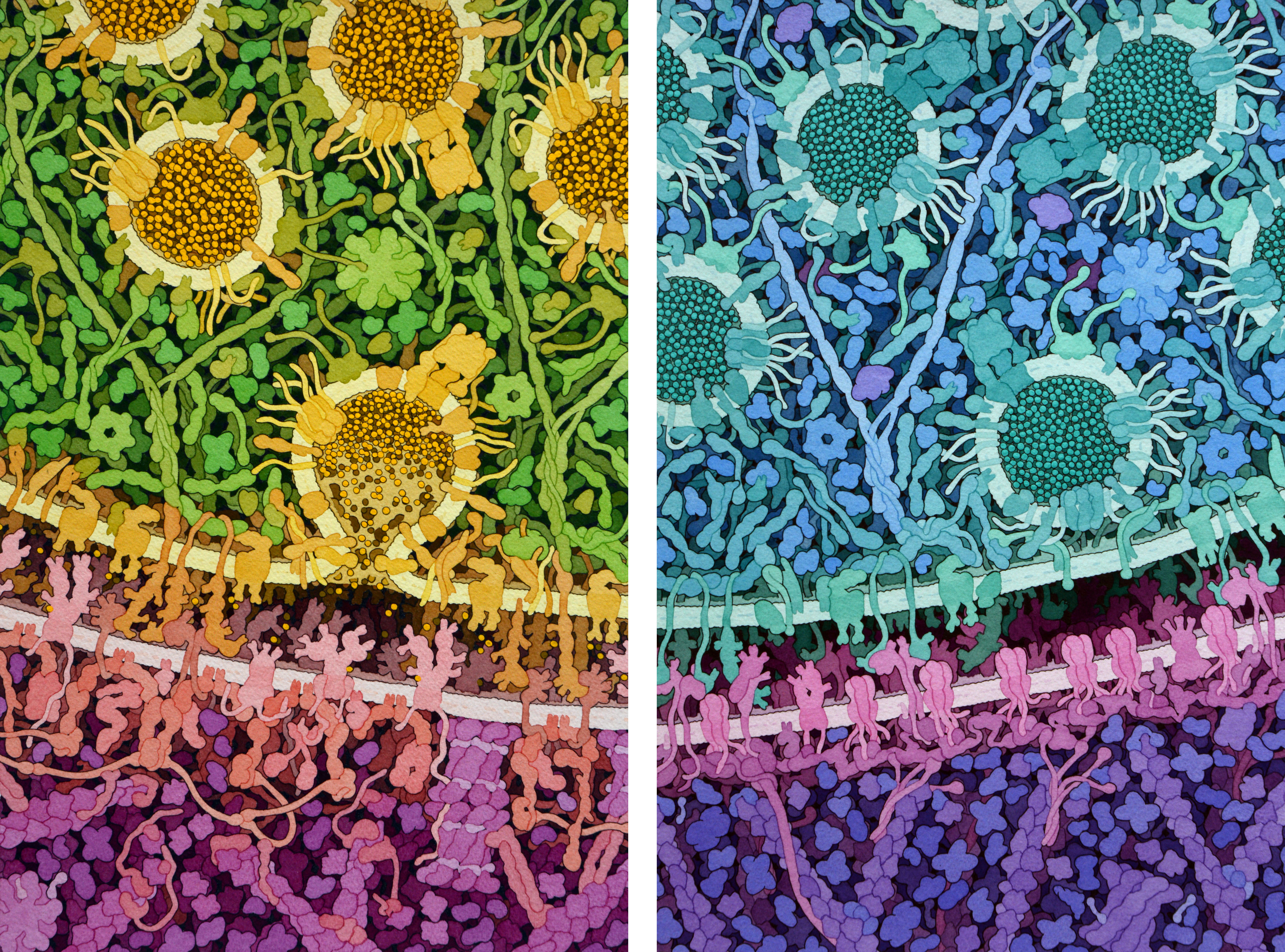

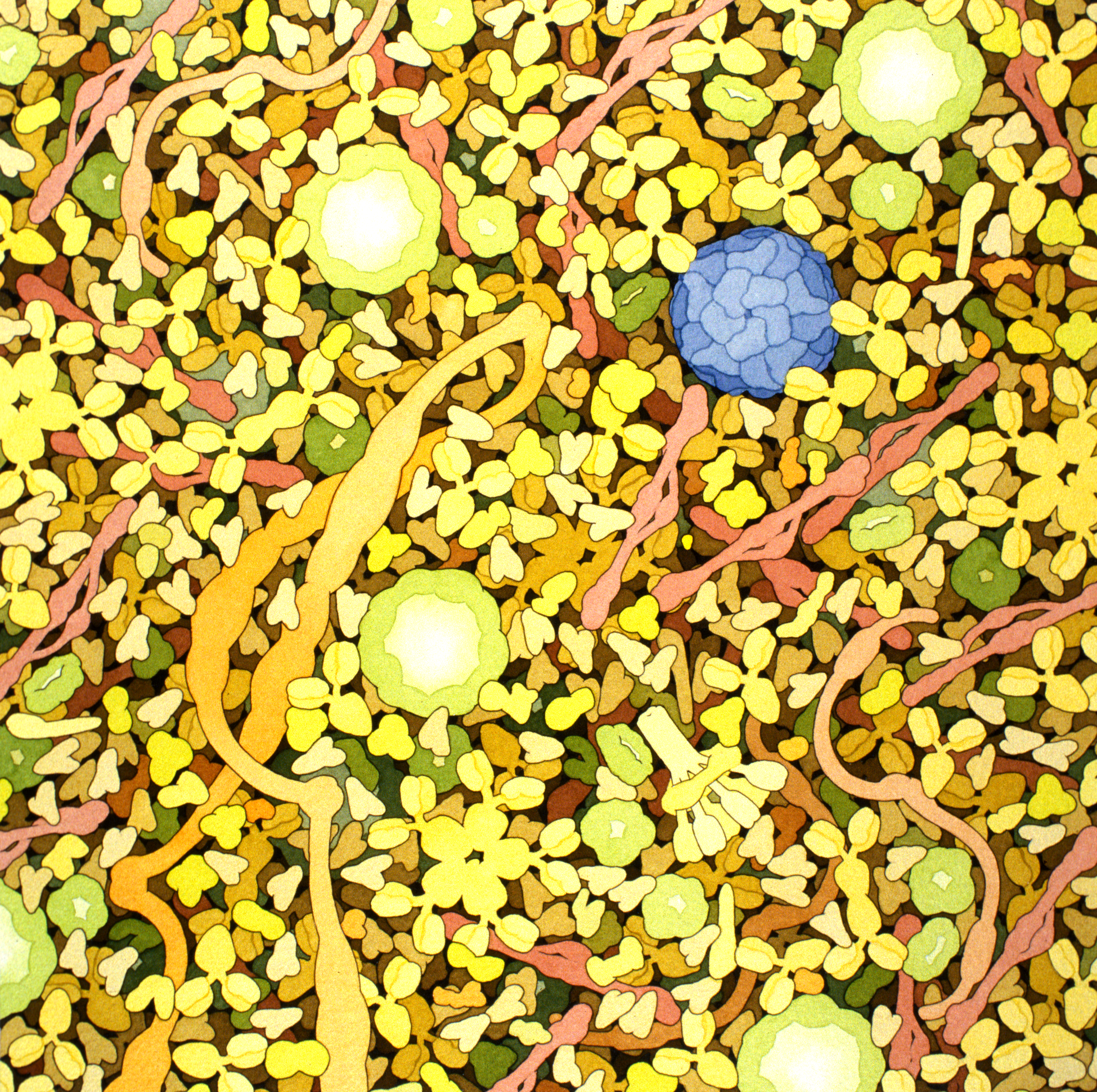
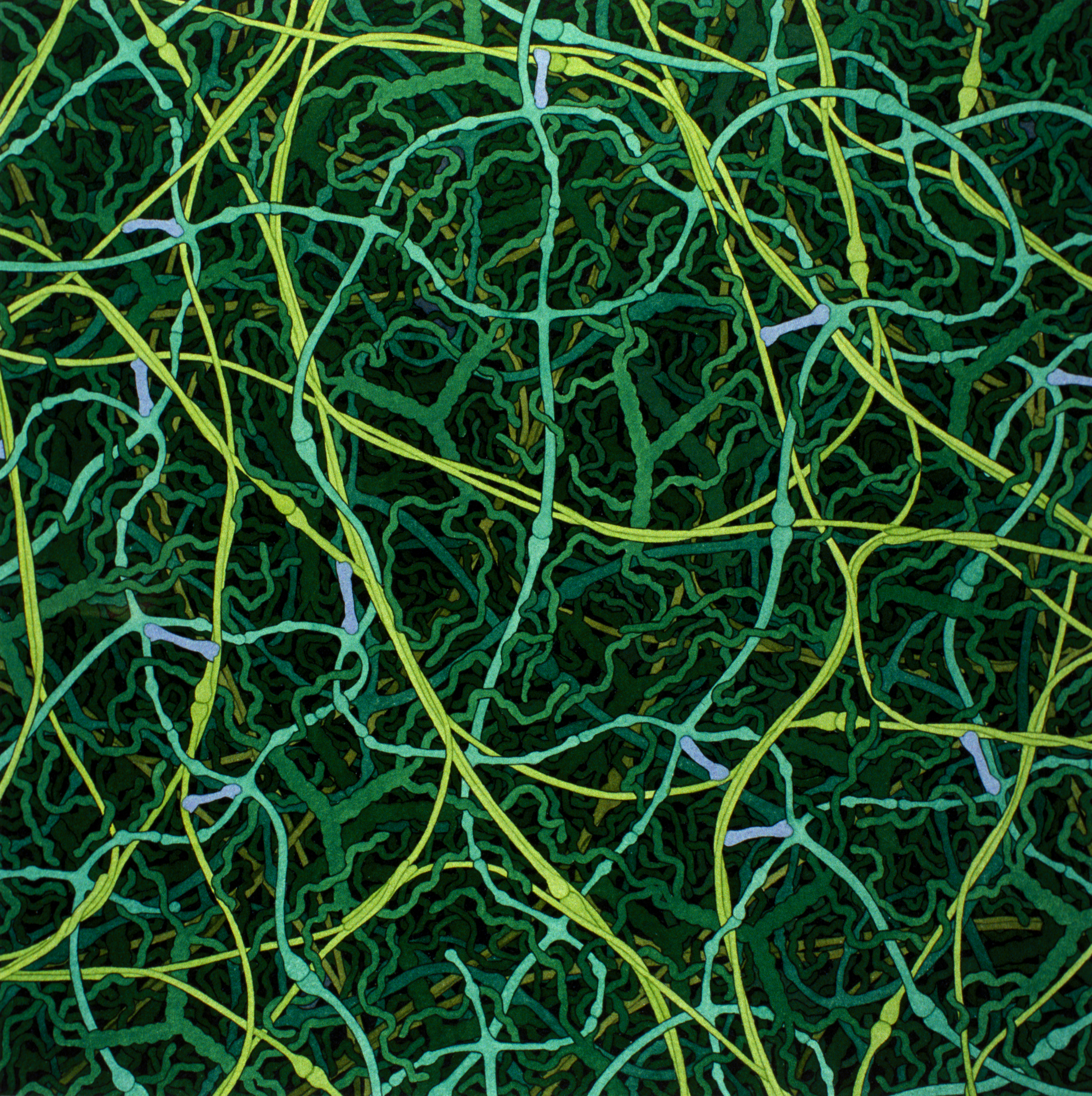

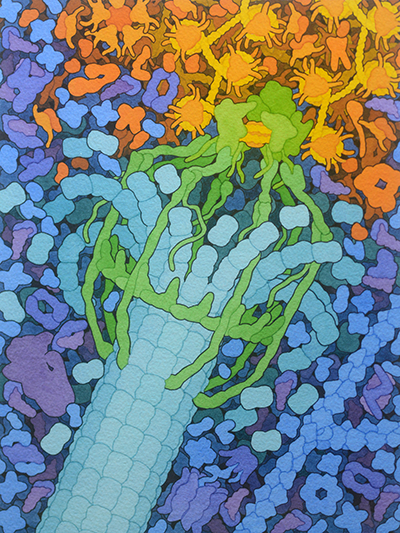

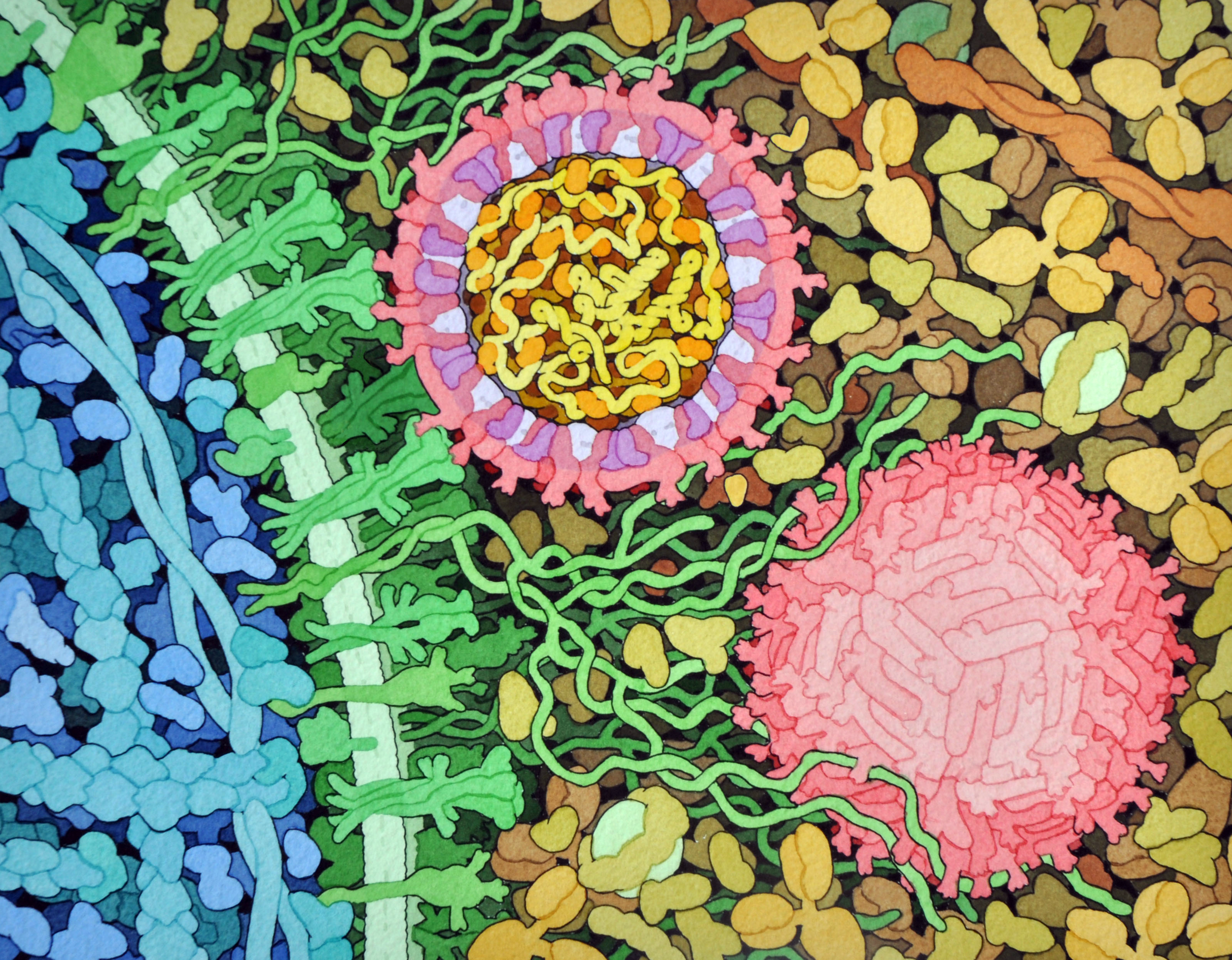
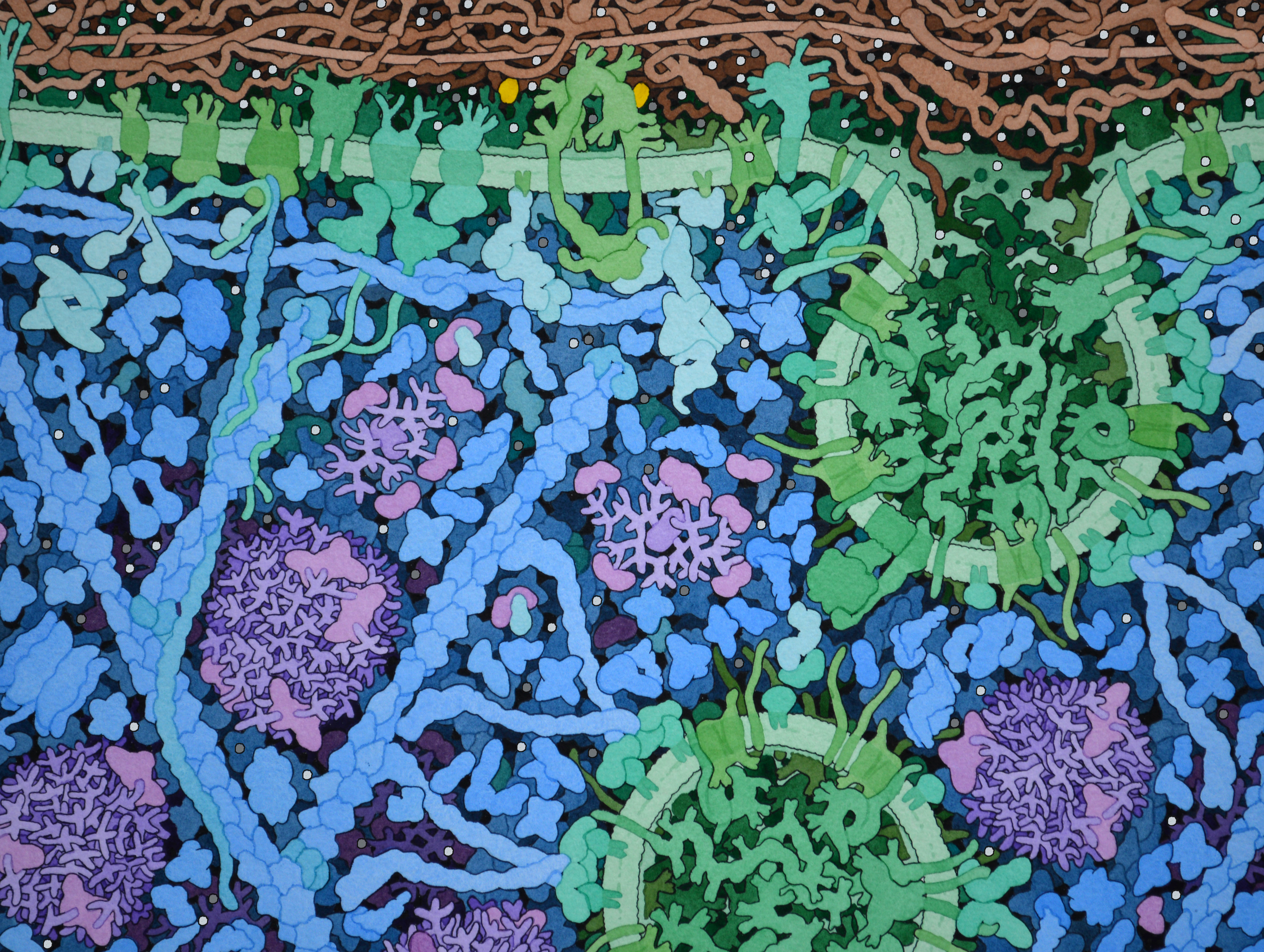

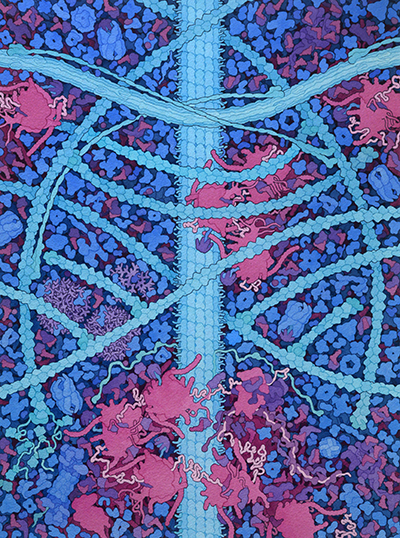

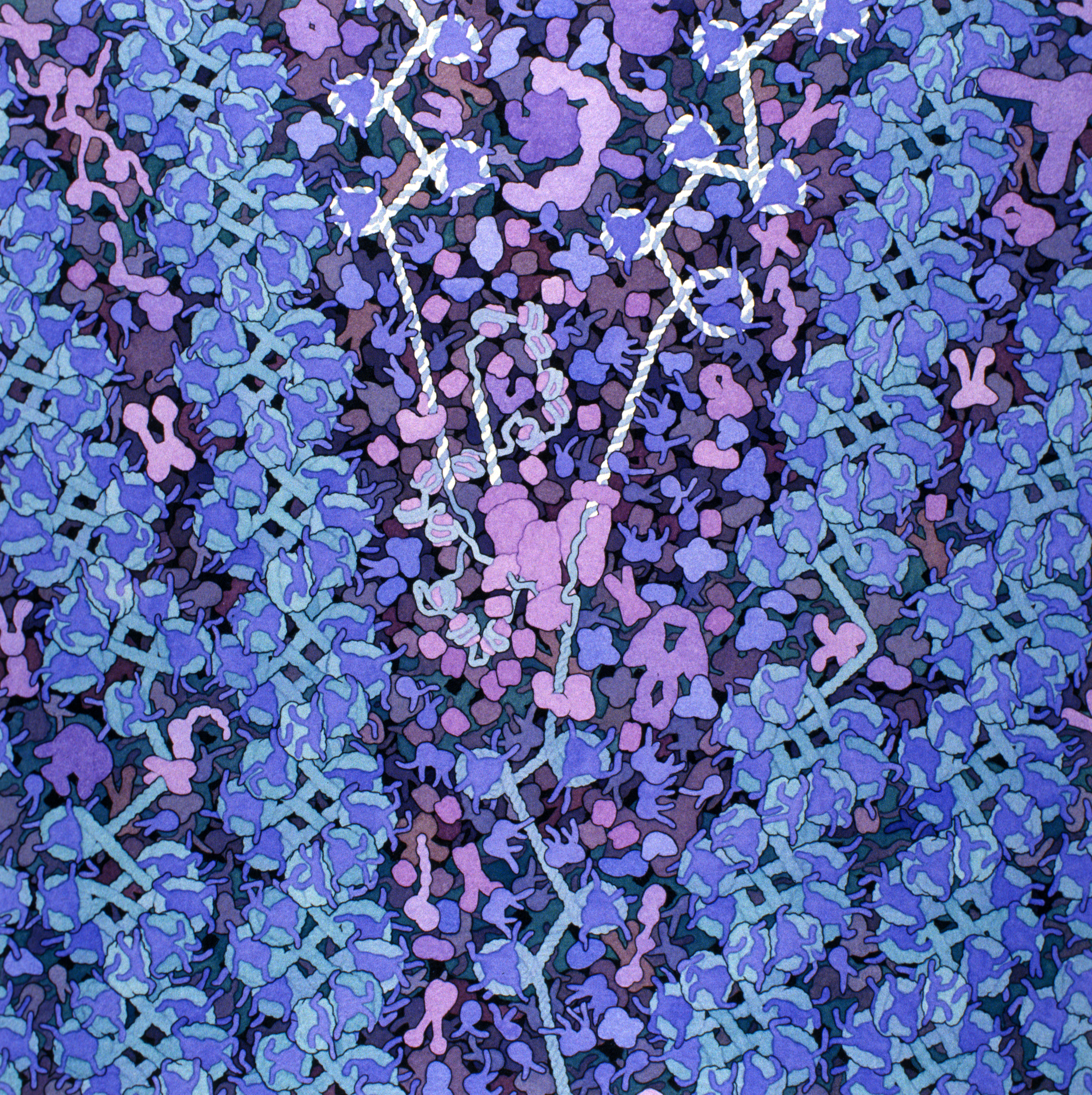
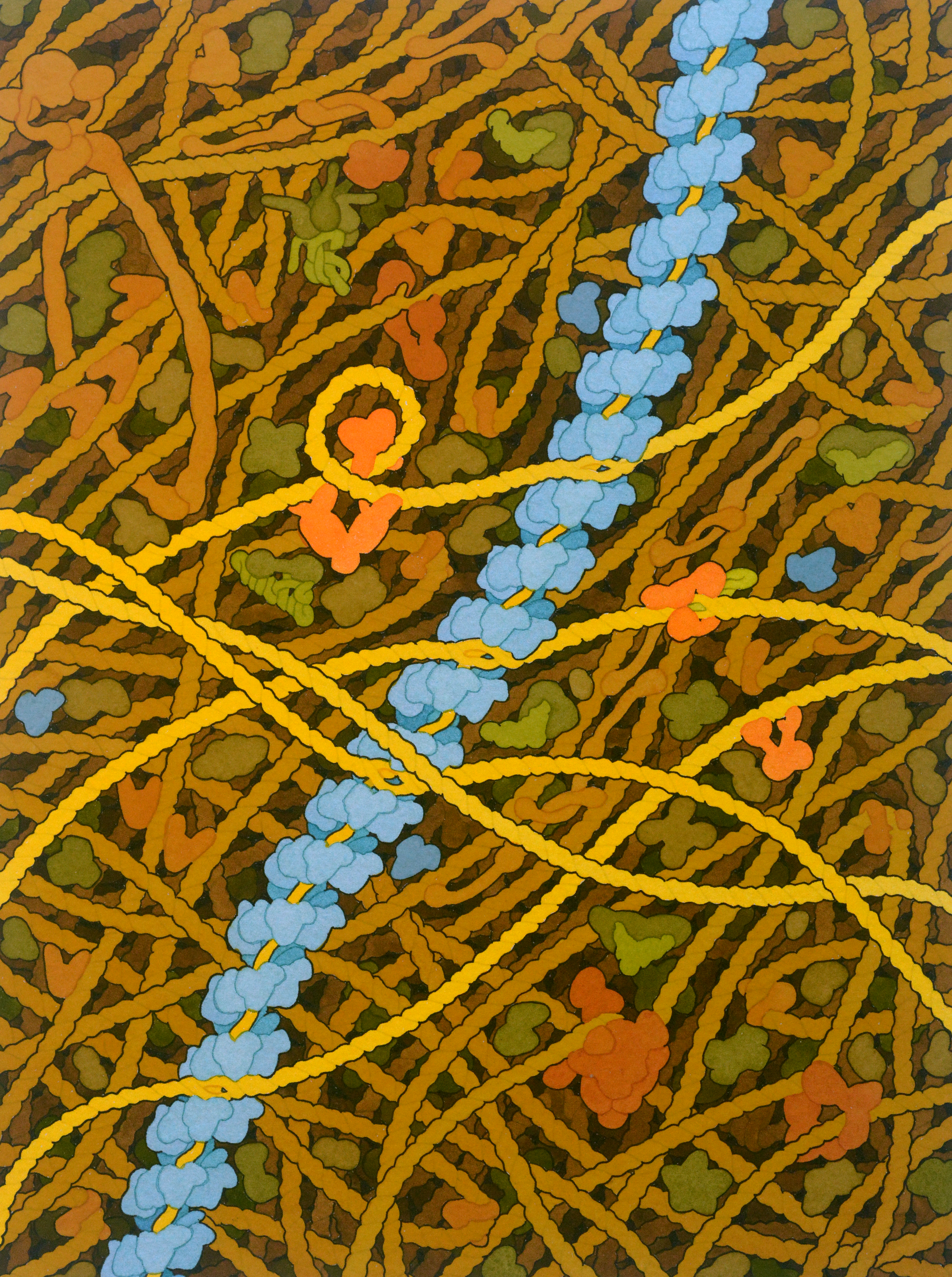

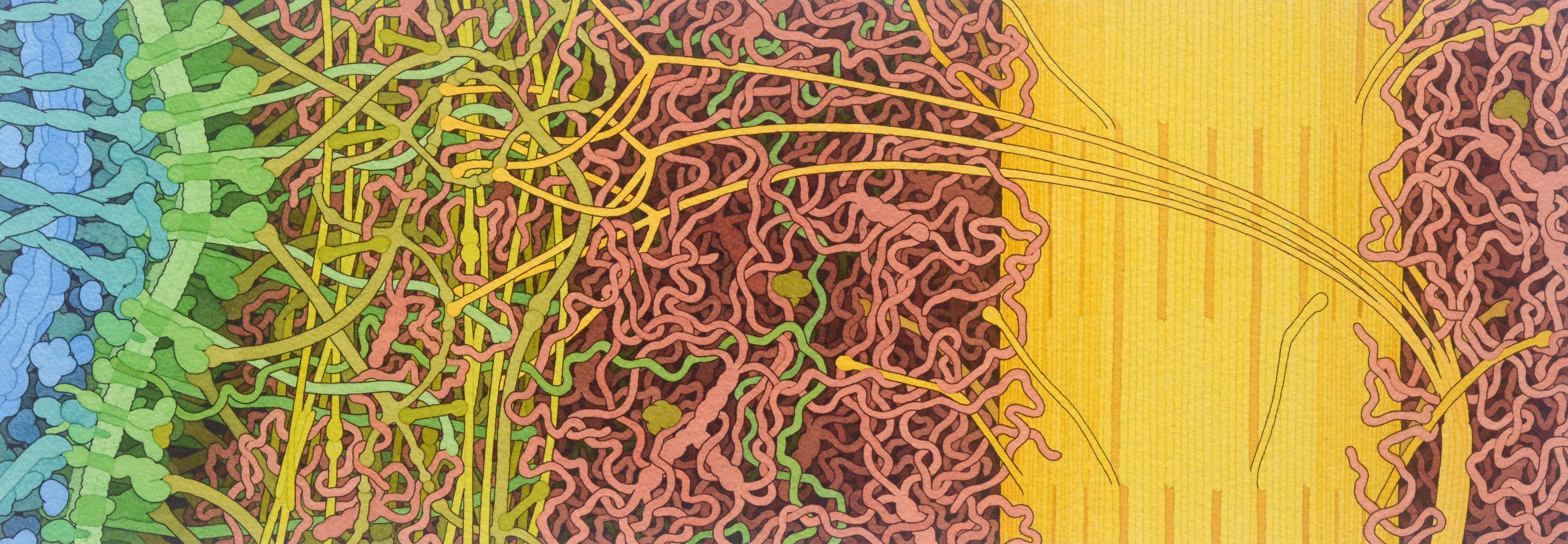
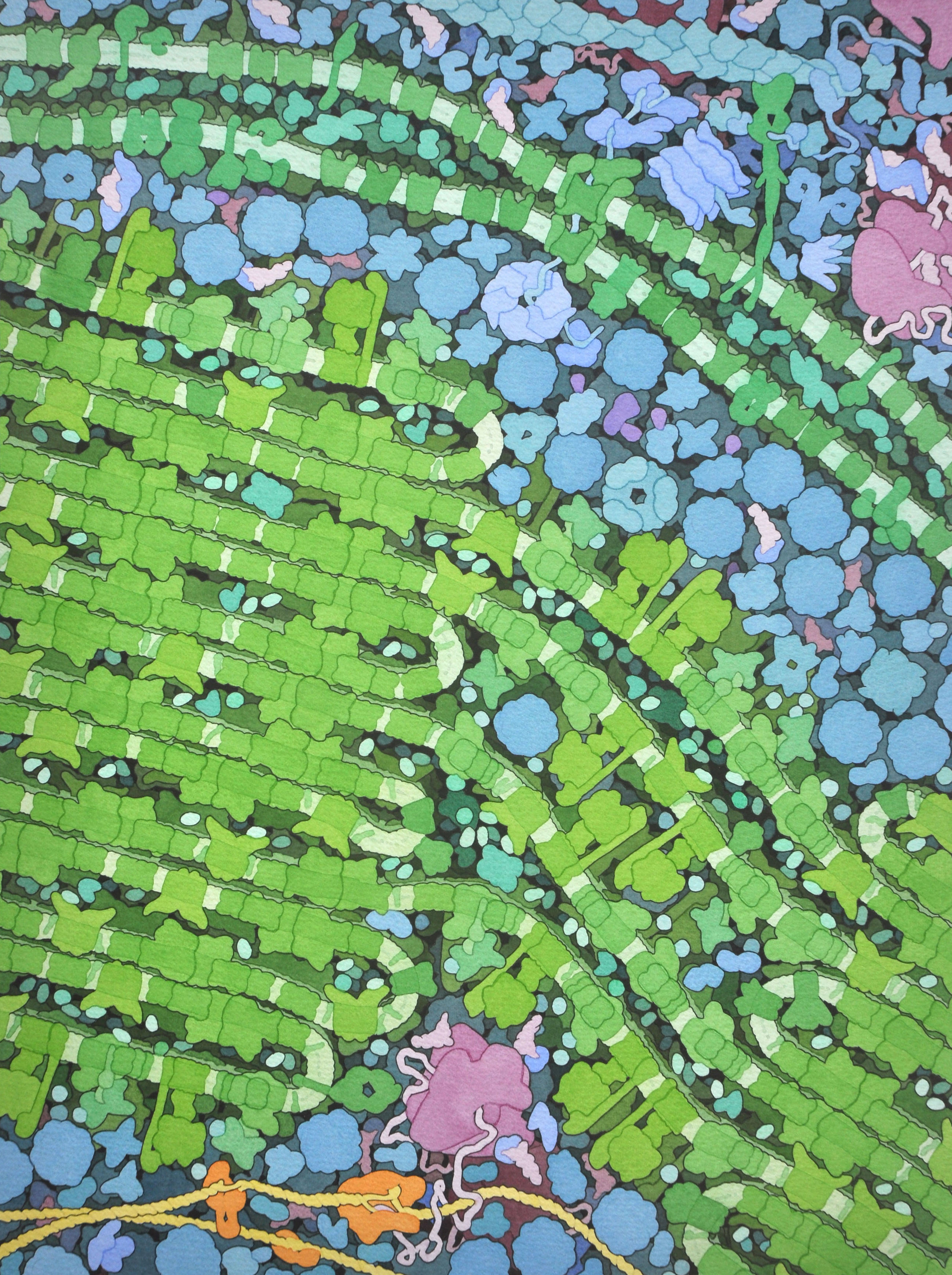

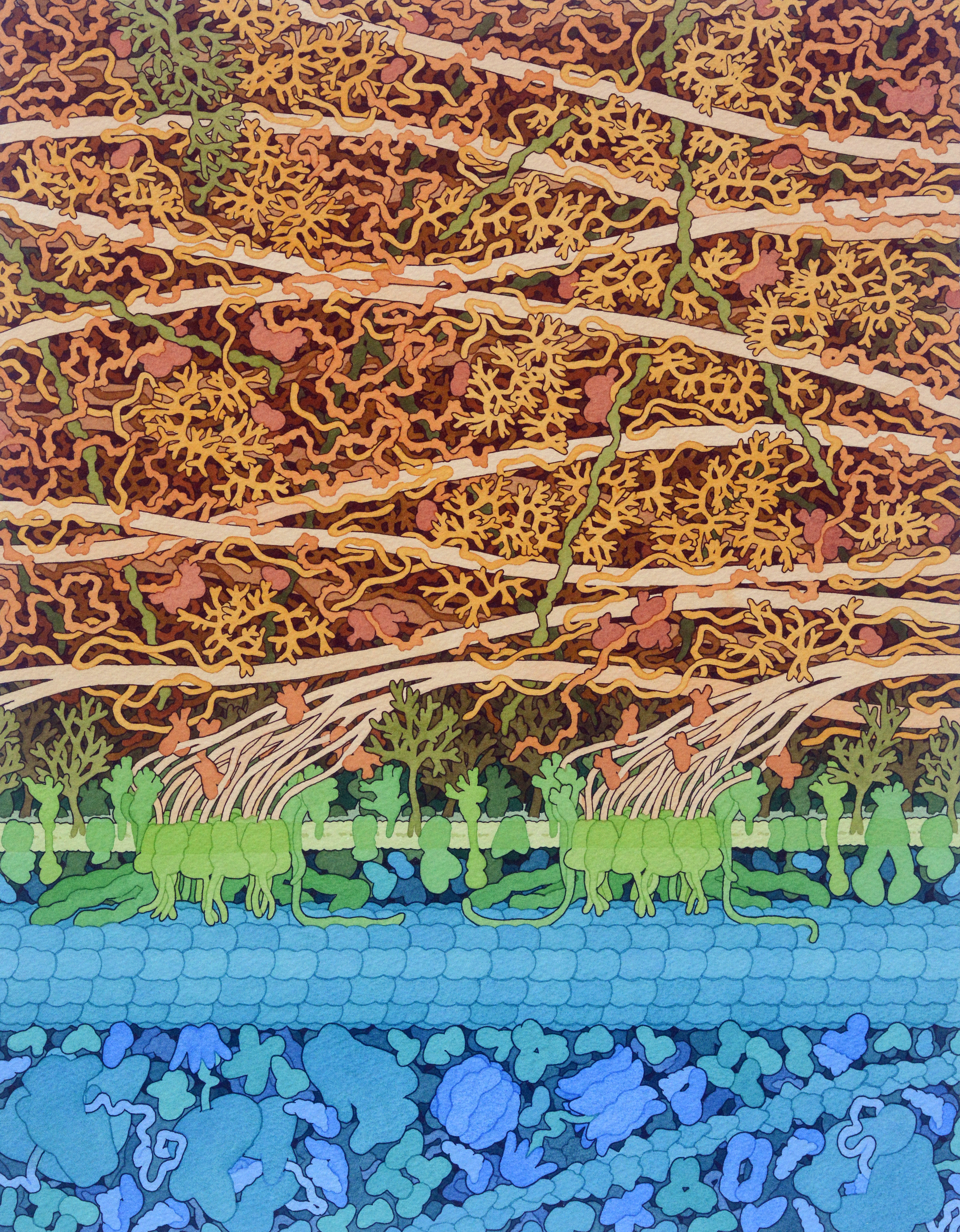

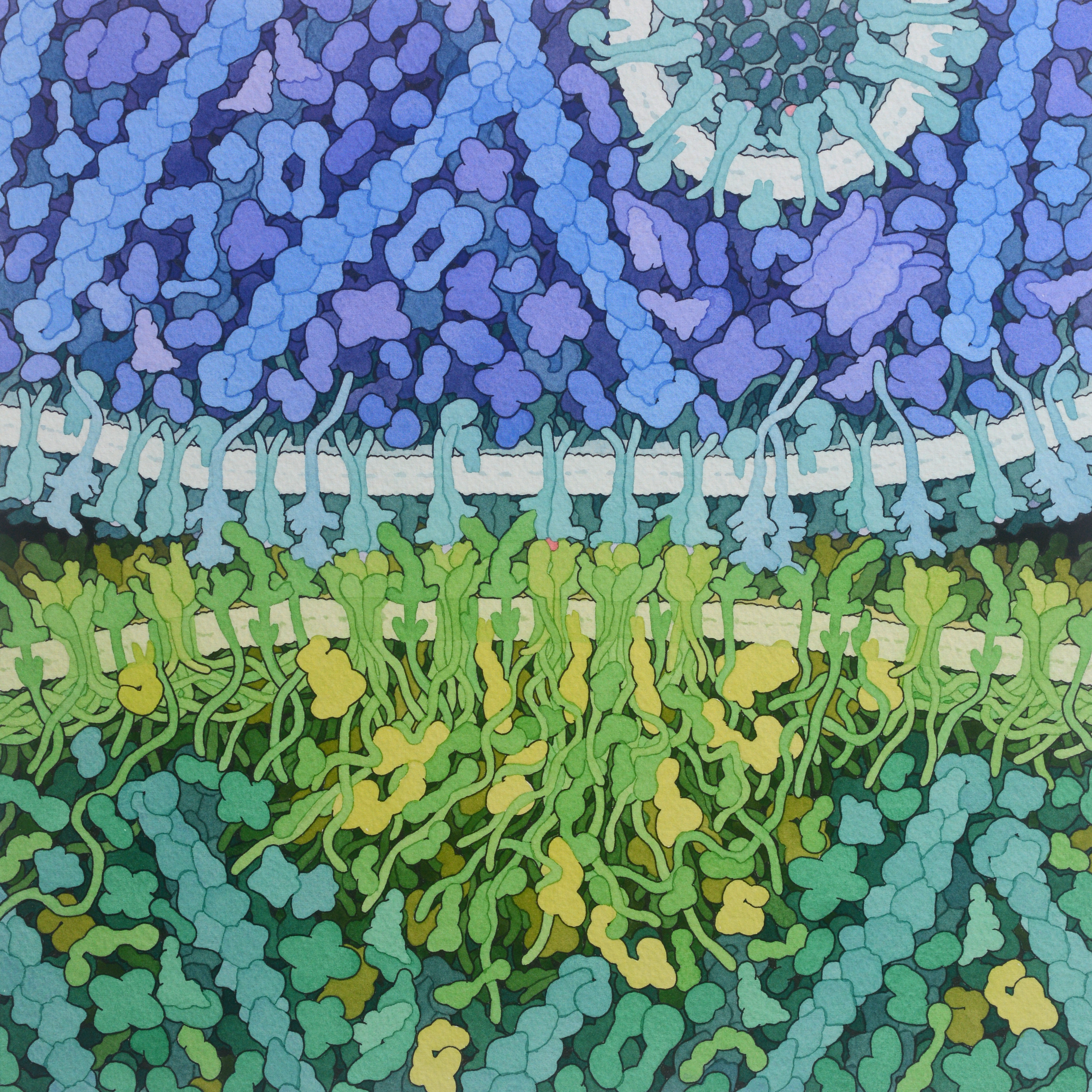

=== Awards and recognition ===
In 2022, Goodsell was the recipient of the Carl Brändén Award. The award honors an outstanding protein scientist who has also made exceptional contributions in the areas of education and/or service.

== Bibliography ==
In addition to scientific papers, Goodsell is the author of several scientific books with a focus on illustration:

- Atomic Evidence: Seeing the Molecular Basis of Life (Springer International, 2016)
- Bionanotechnology: Lessons from Nature (J. Wiley and Sons, 2004)
- Our Molecular Nature: The Body's Motors, Machines, and Messages (Springer-Verlag, 1996)
- The Machinery of Life (Springer-Verlag, 1993).
