= Oded Wagenstein =

Photographer

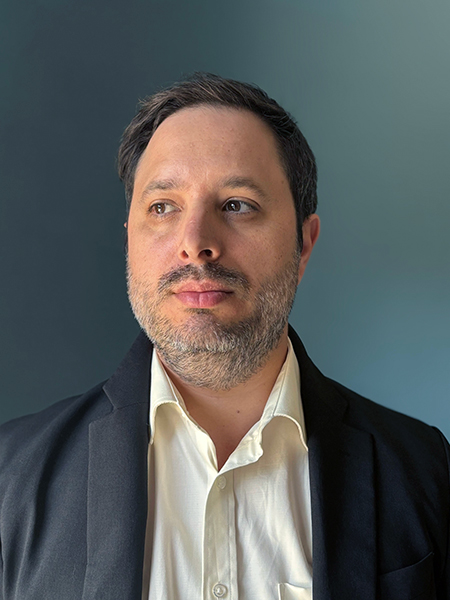
- Oded Wagenstein in 2025
- Born: 1986 (age 39–40)
- Occupations: Photographer, Educator
- Known for: Long-term portrait photography on aging and marginalized communities
- Website: odedwagen.com

Oded Wagenstein (born 1986) is a photographer focusing on pictures of aging populations and marginalized communities. His work has appeared in National Geographic and The Washington Post, and his photographs have been exhibited at Rencontres de la Photographie d'Arles in France, the United Nations, the National Portrait Gallery, London. and his work is held in the Wellcome Collection, London .

== Selected projects ==
Wagenstein has worked on and published long-term photography projects, including:

=== The Void We Leave (2015) ===
The project depicts elderly residents in Cienfuegos, Cuba. The series was published by National Geographic, featured by LensCulture, and was exhibited at the State Historical Museum in Moscow.

=== Like Last Year’s Snow (2017) ===
The series documents former nomadic women living in social isolation in Northern Siberia. The series was published by The Guardian, BBC, and Vogue Italia, and was exhibited as part of the official programme of Rencontres d'Arles photography festival.

=== Transparent Curtains (2019) ===
The series focuses on aging gay men in a context of legal and social exclusion. The Washington Post described it as presenting stories of "longing, dreams, shame, and fear".

=== Silent Farewells (2023) ===
The project depicted cases of elderly suicide and its impact on families and communities. The series was exhibited as part of the Sony World Photography Awards at Somerset House.

== Awards and recognition ==
Year	Award	Organization	Result	Reference
2019	Taylor Wessing Photographic Portrait Prize	National Portrait Gallery, London	Exhibitor	
2020	Portrait of Humanity	British Journal of Photography	Won	
2021	Picture of the year	Picture of the year Asia	Won	
2021	Portrait Awards	LensCulture	Won	
2021	Wellcome Photography Prize	Wellcome Trust	Finalist	
2022	Picture of the year Contest Judge	Picture of the year Asia	Judge	
2024	Picture of the year	Picture of the year Asia	Finalist	
2025	Sony World Photography Awards	World Photography Organisation	Finalist	
2025	Award of Excellence	Pictures of the Year International	Won	
2025	Wellcome Photography Prize	Wellcome Trust	Finalist	
