= Stella Johnson =

Stella Johnson may refer to:

- Esther Johnson, English friend of Jonathan Swift, known as "Stella"
- Stella Johnson (basketball), American basketball player
- Stella Johnson (photographer), American photographer
