= Benji Reid =

British photographer (born 1966)

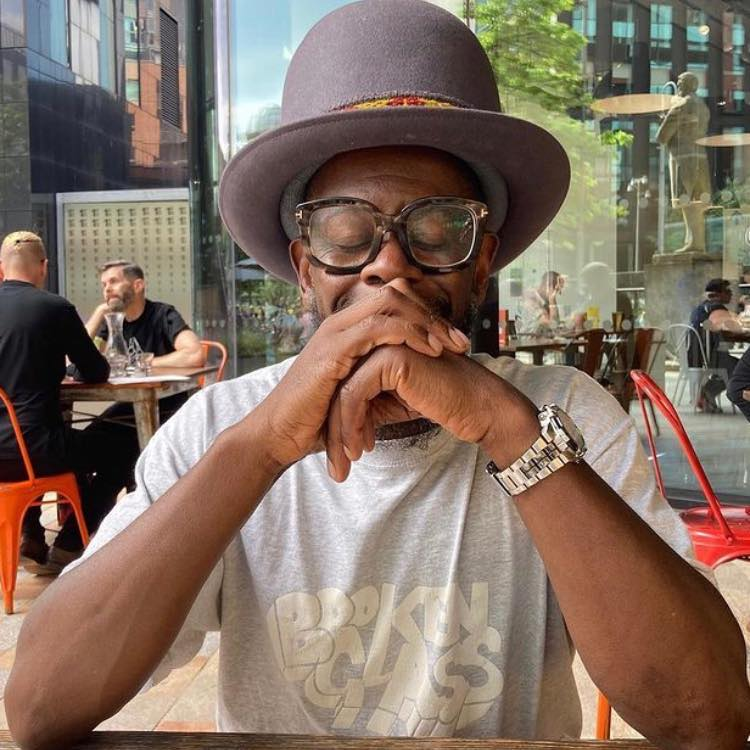
- Benji Reid in 2021
- Occupation: photographer
- Website: benjireid.com

Benji Reid (born 1966) is a British photographer, visual theatre maker, and educator. His work focuses on the intersection of race, nationhood, and gender with particular attention to the Black British experience, Black masculinity, and mental health.

His photograph Holding on to Daddy (2016) was the winner of the Wellcome Photography Prize 2020 Mental Health category. A pioneer of hip-hop theatre and culture in the United Kingdom, Reid defines himself as a "choreo-photolist", a term he coined to refer to the practice of merging theatre and choreography in his photography.

His work was shown at the MoCADA Museum in New York, Somerset House in London, and Design Fair Paris.

== Early years ==
Benji Reid grew up in Manchester in a family who was actively involved in the arts and in which artistic training was highly valued. Together with sisters Joan, Beverly, and Claudia, Reid was introduced to music and dance from a very young age: "I knew from an early age I was going to be an artist. Dance was my first love, but as time evolved I became more interested to drama and story telling." Reid took an interest in contemporary dance at the age of seven when he started attending shows with his mother at the local Palace Theatre. In 1974, at the age of eight, he underwent a major heart bypass surgery. This episode shaped Reid's existentialist look on life and art and his fascination with mortality and the human condition. Despite his health issues, he taught himself the robot dance which was popular in the late 1970s and early 1980s and this segued into popping. Between 1984 and 1986, Reid toured nationally and internationally with Broken Glass, one of the main breakdance crews in the United Kingdom.

== Dance and theatre ==
In 1986, Reid started attending the Northern School of Contemporary Dance where he studied ballet, contemporary, choreography, and lighting design. In 1990, after his first theatre experience in Alan Lyddiard's production of The Tempest for the Edinburgh Festival, Reid auditioned for Soul II Soul at The Fridge nightclub in Brixton, London, became chief dancer and co-choreographer for some of their numbers, and went on a world tour as part of the collective after the release of their multi-award-winning album Club Classics Vol. One.

After his training as a dancer and the experience with Soul II Soul, Reid trained for a year with David Glass and toured nationally with him. Between 1992 and 1994, Reid worked with director Denise Wong and the Black Mime theatre company on the shows Heart and EDR. In 1994–1995, he directed Jonzi D's solo of Aeroplane Man; again in partnership with Jonzi D, Reid co-created the pieces Silence da Bitchin' and Cracked (1995) while, in 1996-1997, he wrote and starred in Paper Jackets.

The first main stage play directed by Reid was the hip-hop musical Avalanche for Nottingham Playhouse (1998). This show marked the foundation of Reid’s company Breaking Cycles in 1999-2000. In the mid-1990s, hip-hop theatre was developing simultaneously in the United States and the United Kingdom, but Jonzi D and Reid were pivotal in connecting the two areas when they took part in the Hip-Hop Theater Festival in New York in the early 2000s. Reid was the curator of The Illness, the first night of hip-hop theatre at Sadler’s Wells Theatre, London (2000) with Jim Parris, DJ Bizniss, Robert Hylton, Jonzi D, and Abstract Dance (Mo Ideas and Frank Wilson). In 2003-2004, Jonzi D also directed Reid’s 13 Mics. Reid's play The Holiday (2000), tackling mental health and suicide, has been internationally acclaimed; it toured to PS122 in New York, the Sydney Opera House, Linbury Theatre (Royal Opera House), QEH Theatre, and Contact Theatre. In 2006 Reid founded Process 06, "the UK's first ever artist-led hip hop theatre festival" and an opportunity to explore hip-hop theatre as an educational tool.

== Photography and choreo-photolism ==
When his company was left without funds in 2011, Reid's journey into photography started. A father of two, he began with a camera he had previously used to document theatre work and employed it to record his younger daughter growing up. Reid has stated that “some people came out of the Northern School of Contemporary Dance as dancers, I came out as an artist”; his artistic approach is summarised by the term choreo-photolism, a word he coined to refer to the encounter of photography, choreography, theatre, and storytelling in his work. Embracing photography was an act of resistance towards financial instability and the limitations of his everyday life: "Taking pictures became an act of revolution for me. It was an act of defiance that I was still going to continue making work without getting funded." Up to that point, theatre had been his primary means of expression: as a theatre director, he had always worked with bodies in space, but his challenge in photography has been condensing a story in an image through the use of everyday objects turned into fantastical props. Reid's first photography exhibition was A Thousand Words at Contact Theatre in Manchester in October 2016.

From a love note to his daughter to exploring mental health through surreal portraits and self-portraits, photography for Reid also represents a possibility to celebrate love and fragility challenging stereotypes of Black masculinity. Other relevant themes in his production are Black fatherhood, life as an outsider, and mental health. Reid refers to his creative work as "part ritual, part photography, and part prayer."

2023 marked Reid's return to theatre with a work that combines his photographic practice with his previous career in the performing arts. Find Your Eyes, a meditation on the creative process, premiered at Manchester Academy in Summer 2023. It is a live stage performance incorporating "dance, theatre telling, and photography." In the show, Reid stages the private moment of the creation of his photographs and shares memories from his life with a live audience: "Woven into the narration are episodes of Reid's own life. He calls what he does 'conflict photography', not images of the battlefield, but the ravages of everyday war, especially that of a Black person in the UK. He exposes the conflicts of his own life, to distressing depths of despair: addiction, depression, racism, the social care system. But he also shows us creativity, fantasy, collaboration and imagination taking flight." Find Your Eyes was also at Internationaal Theater Amsterdam in October 2023, at the 60th edition of the Venice Biennale in July 2024, and at Factory International/Aviva Studios, Manchester, and Sadler's Wells, London, in Spring 2025. The show had its Arab World Premiere at NYUAD The Arts Centre, Abu Dhabi, in September 2025.

== Exhibitions ==
=== Selected solo exhibitions ===
2021: Benji Reid: Laugh at Gravity, October Gallery, London, England

2016: A Thousand Words, Contact Theatre, Manchester, England

=== Selected group exhibitions ===
2022: In the Light: Photographic works by James Barnor, Benji Reid, Alexis Peskine and Zana Masombuka, October Gallery, London, England

2022: A Modest Show, Whitworth Art Gallery, Manchester, England

2021: Shadow to Substance, Harn Museum of Art, University of Florida, Florida, USA

2021: Photo London, with October Gallery, London, England

2021: 1-54 Contemporary African Art Fair, New York, (online) with October Gallery, London, England

2021: 50 Windows of Creativity, The National Football Museum, Manchester, England

2020: 1-54 Contemporary African Art Fair, with October Gallery, London, England

2020: 1-54 Contemporary African Art Fair, New York, (online) with October Gallery, London, England

2020: Atmospheres: Artists of the Transavantgarde, October Gallery, London, England

2020: Investec Cape Town Art Fair, Cape Town, South Africa, with October Gallery, London, England

2019: Get Up, Stand Up Now, Somerset House, London, England

2019: AKAA (Also Known As Africa), Paris, France with October Gallery, London, England

2019: Styles of Resistance: From the Corner to the Catwalk, MoCADA (Museum of Contemporary African Diasporan Arts), New York, USA

== List of awards ==
=== Dance ===
1988: 1st Place – Champion d’Europe Electric Boogie IDO (Macon, France)

1986: 2nd Place – Campionato del Mondo Electric Boogie IDO (Montecatini, Italy)

1986: 3rd Place – World Dance Festival Electric Boogie IDO (Italy)

1986: U.K. Body Popping Champion (Manchester, England)

=== Theatre ===
2005: NESTA Dreamtime Fellowship

2005: Finalist - ART05 Outstanding Achievement in the Arts in the North West (Liverpool)

=== Photography ===
2020: Mental Health Single Image Winner – Wellcome Trust Photography Prize
