= Adetona Omokanye =

Nigerian creative photographer (born 1990)

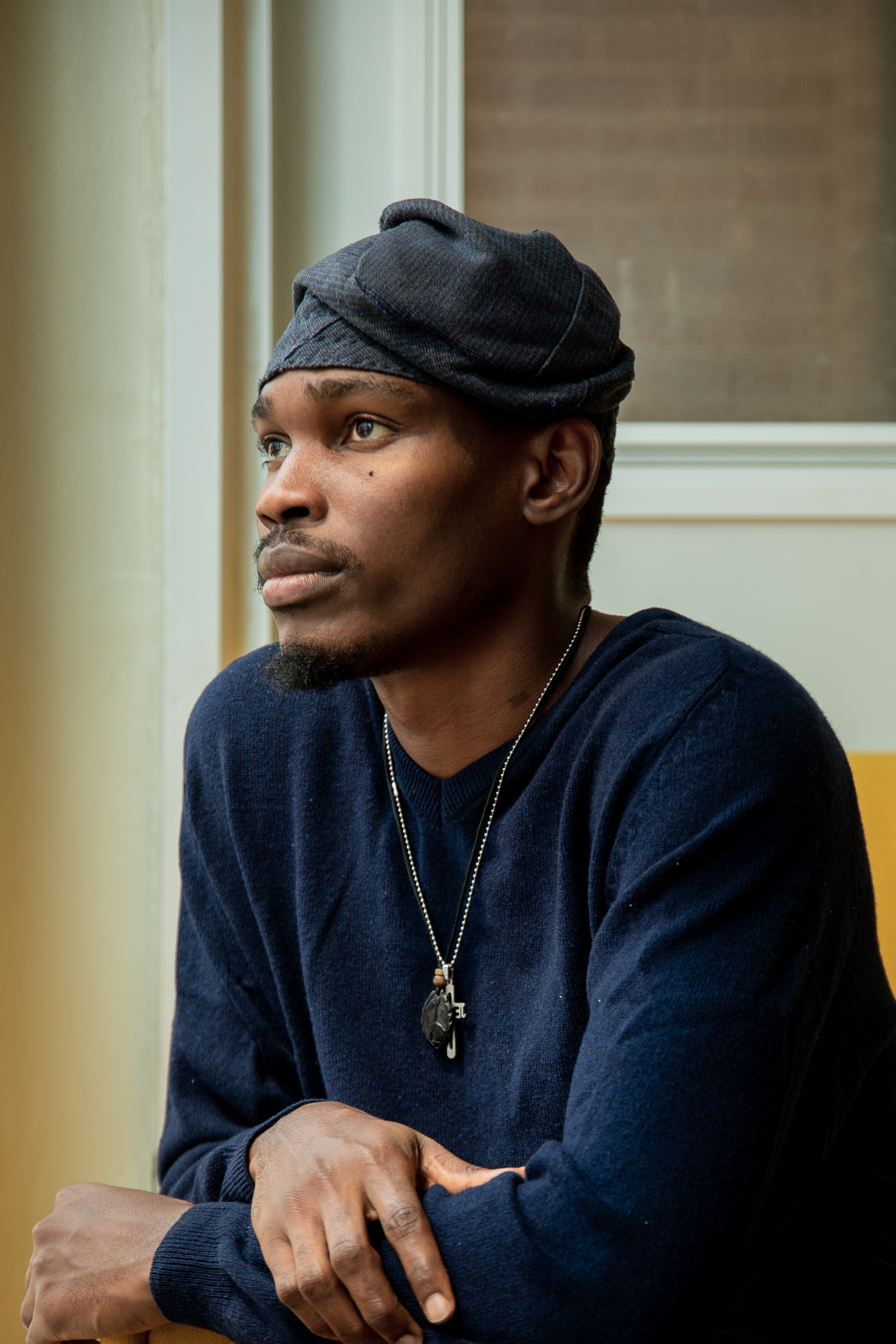
- Born: Adetona Omokanye; 17 July 1990 (age 36); Erin-Ile, Kwara, Nigeria
- Education: University of Lagos
- Occupations: Photographer, visual artist
- Known for: Photography
- Website: adetonaomokanye.com

Adetona Omokanye (born 17 July 1990) is a Nigerian creative photographer. Born in Erin-Ile, Kwara State, Nigeria, he currently lives in Toronto, Canada, having moved there from Lagos, Nigeria in 2020. Omokanye has at different times worked on assignments and commissions for Bloomberg, Getty Images, World Food Programme, Eater, Global Citizen among others. His compelling works have earned him international renown and features in several exhibitions and media platforms across the globe.

== Education ==
Omokanye earned a Bachelor of Science degree in Marine Science at the University of Lagos in 2013. He then proceeded to obtain a Master of Science degree in marine pollution and management at the same institution in 2017.

== Works and recognition ==
In 2018, Adetona Omokanye worked with German freelance journalist Petra Sorge to undertake a three-month-long documentary investigation exposing occupational hazards, poisoning and environmental pollution within and around lead-acid battery recycling industries in Lagos and Ogun states of Nigeria. The three-part media report produced from the investigation on BusinessDay Newspaper was awarded the first prize of the Fetisov Journalism Awards in the Excellence in Environmental Journalism category in 2019. Omokanye has been profiled on the Create Magazine.

Adetona Omokanye is the first Nigerian and African to earn the Creative Bursary awarded by Getty Images and Verizon Media (now Yahoo). He earned the disability-themed grant in 2019 as a third-place winner with his project titled "Beyond 4ft-10inch" which seeks to deconstruct the socio-cultural stereotypes of dwarfs in media and advertising in Nigeria. He was one of the inaugural Fellows of the Bakanal de Afrique 2020 Artist Fellowship Cohort, and his collection "Fàyàwọ́" which projects the harsh realities of smuggling across the Benin–Nigerian border was exhibited at the Bakanal de Afrique 'Mi Soon Come 2020' exploring the intersections of urban transportation with culture, class and citizenship. He got an honourable feature as one of the longlisted contestants for the PhMuseum Mobile Photo Prize in 2020. He participated in the New York Portfolio Review 2021 which is produced by The New York Times photo department and the Craig Newmark Graduate School of Journalism at the City University of New York.

In May 2022, Omokanye made the shortlist for the Contemporary African Photography Prize 2022 with his digital collages exploring the nexus between culture and tradition in Egúngún costumery and contemporary haute-couture modelling. In October 2022, the same collection, entitled "Spiritually Fashionable", won him the LensCulture Awards's inaugural Summer Open Awards, alongside 19 other photographers. Pieces from the collection were also part of a public art exhibition entitled "I Am Still Here: Black Joy is Resistance," which showed at Toronto's Union Station from February through May 2023. Between April and July 2023, other works by Omokanye were part of two other group exhibitions in Toronto.

Omokanye's works covering the #EndSARS Protests against police brutality in Nigeria in October 2020 have been featured on various international media platforms including Getty Images, Bloomberg, Wall Street Journal, Times Magazine, Huffington Post, The Guardian, BuzzFeed News, GQ, and Amnesty International. His works on life and society during the Coronavirus pandemic, digital inclusion and devolvement of technologies, food culture and several other themes and social issues in Lagos and other Nigerian cities have also appeared on other international media outlets such as Al Jazeera, Bloomberg, Reuters, Der Spiegel, World Magazine, Eater, Financial Times, CNBC Africa, TechCabal, among several others.

In September 2022, Omokanye was profiled in The Globe and Mail as an important Nigerian photographer challenging the "poverty gaze" on Africa by celebrating West African fashion through his works. He was also interviewed by Union Art as one of the 12 artists whose works were exhibited "Black Dreams and Aspirations" show hosted at Toronto Union Station from February to August 2024.

Omokanye is a member of Diversify Photo, an anticolonial, antipatriarchal, pro-BIPOC inclusionary photo movement; and African Photojournalism Database (APJD), which is a joint project by the World Press Photo Foundation and Everyday Africa.
