= Zhou Chengzhou =

Chinese film director and photographer

- 周承舟
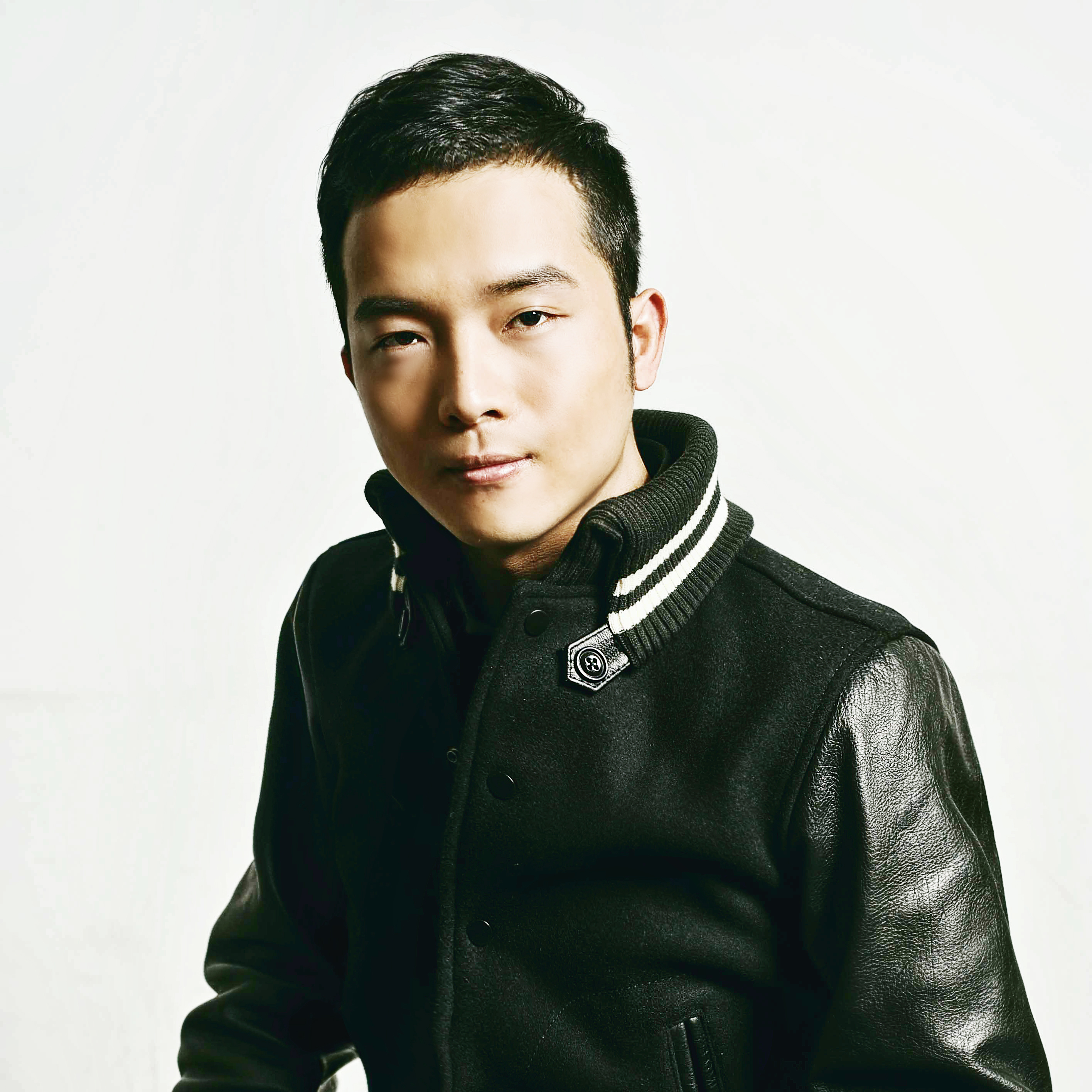
- Zhou Chengzhou
- Born: Zhou Chengzhou; December 28, 1982 (age 43); Changde, China
- Occupations: Film director; Artist; Photographer
- Website: www.zhouchengzhou.com

Zhou Chengzhou (周承舟; born 28 December 1982) is a Chinese film director, artist, and photographer.

He has long given attention to problems relating to the mental and spiritual well-being of individuals and has focused his research and professional activities on such illnesses. Zhou Chengzhou's artistic theory likewise revolves around the concepts of industry, urbanization, and marginalization. Zhou's work as an artist, filmmaker, and writer depicts alienation – between people, places, and a "broader and homogenized culture."

== Early life ==
Zhou Chengzhou was born in Changde city (常德) in Hunan in December 1982.

When Zhou was 7 years old his father taught him how to use a film camera and produce sharper photos, sparking the start of his love of photography. He was only doing it for fun at the time and had no plans to make a career out of photography.

He spent several years developing shoes after earning his degree in Chinese language and literature from Peking University in 2005. But it was during this period that his love for photography was rekindled as he took over 200,000 images of the shoes to promote them online. This enhanced his photographic abilities.

In 2015 he shifted more of his attention to photography, honing his skills through various experiences, including a stint on the set of a TV show and shooting at Paris Fashion Week in 2016. He then officially became a photographer and embarked on a career behind the lens, shooting photos of giant engineering projects and high-speed rail infrastructure using drones. As his experience grew, he sought to break away from traditional photography concepts and develop his style.

== Biography ==
He focuses mostly on producing and studying work related to spiritual consciousness. His work underscores the gap between people and a broader universal culture while including themes of industrialization, urbanization, and marginalization.

== Awards and honors ==
- Selected filmmaker & Recipient, DJI New Emerging Vision Awrad - Venice Production Bridge X DJI, during the 83rd Venice international Film Festival, Venice, Italy
- The LensCulture Summer open Awards 2022, Winner
- Silvana S. Foundation Commission Award 2022, Shortlist
- The 1x photo awards 2017/18, Winner
- Aesthetica Art Prize 2019 and 2023, Finalist
- Photofest with National Geographic award 2019, Winner
- Lensculture Art photography award 2018, Finalist
- 5th FAPA Award, Finalist

== Filmmaking career ==
His first film, Sub-subconscious, was released in 2020, won the Best Audience Award feature film at 13 festival del cinema patologico, and won the Jury Award at LA Underground Film Forum. It was Nominated by Adirondack Film Festival, and Jelly Film Festival.

He completed his second film, Unreflex Land, in 2021.

He completed his first feature film, Time provider, in 2022.

In September2026, Zhou Chengzhou was selected as a filmmaker to participate in the "New Generation, New Cinematic Language - Exploring Osmo Pocket 4P" program at Venice Production Bridge, held during the 83rd Venice International Film Festival in Venice, Italy. His film A Gilr's Fantastic Journey was presnted as part of program. He received the DJI New Emerging Vision Award during the event, presented by Cristiano Di Nicola.

== Filmography ==
Year	Title	Director	Writer
2020	Sub-subconscious	Yes	Yes
2021	Unreflex Land (Short)	Yes	Yes
2022	Time provider	Yes	Yes
2022	Times paradise (Short)	Yes	Yes
2022	Brick hauling	Yes	Yes
2023	Irises bloom	Yes	Yes
2023	Armour Hung	Yes	Yes
2025	San San (Short)	Yes	Yes
2026	Misty Garden	Yes	Yes
2026	A Girl's Fantastic Journey (Short)	Yes	Yes

== Exhibitions ==
The Brink – Exhibition at Ugly Duck, 2023

LensCulture Exhibition – Exhibition at Somerset House, Photo London 2023

Times paradise - Aesthetica Art Prize 2023 Exhibition at York Art Gallery, 2023

Times paradise – 798 Art Zone, IDEAL GAS, 2023

Where did the trash go? – Exhibition at Today Art Museum, 2020

Beyond Boundaries – LensCulture Exhibition at Aperture Gallery 2019

Under the Consciousness - Aesthetica Art Prize 2019 Exhibition at York Art Gallery, 2019

A Planet in Balance – Photofest with National Geographic sponsored gallery 2019

Multidimensional nature – Pingyao International Photography Festival, 2017

== Publications ==
- Times paradise, 2024
- VISION MAGAZINE SPRING 2023 No.190 Culture – While Wander, While Play
- Future Now, 2023
- X, 1X, 2018 ISBN 9789-1979-1847-3
- Future Now, 2019
- Vulgar life and elegant chant, Chinese -style Mondrian, P232-233, 2015, ISBN 978-7-115-41109-9
