= Barbara Peacock =

American photographer

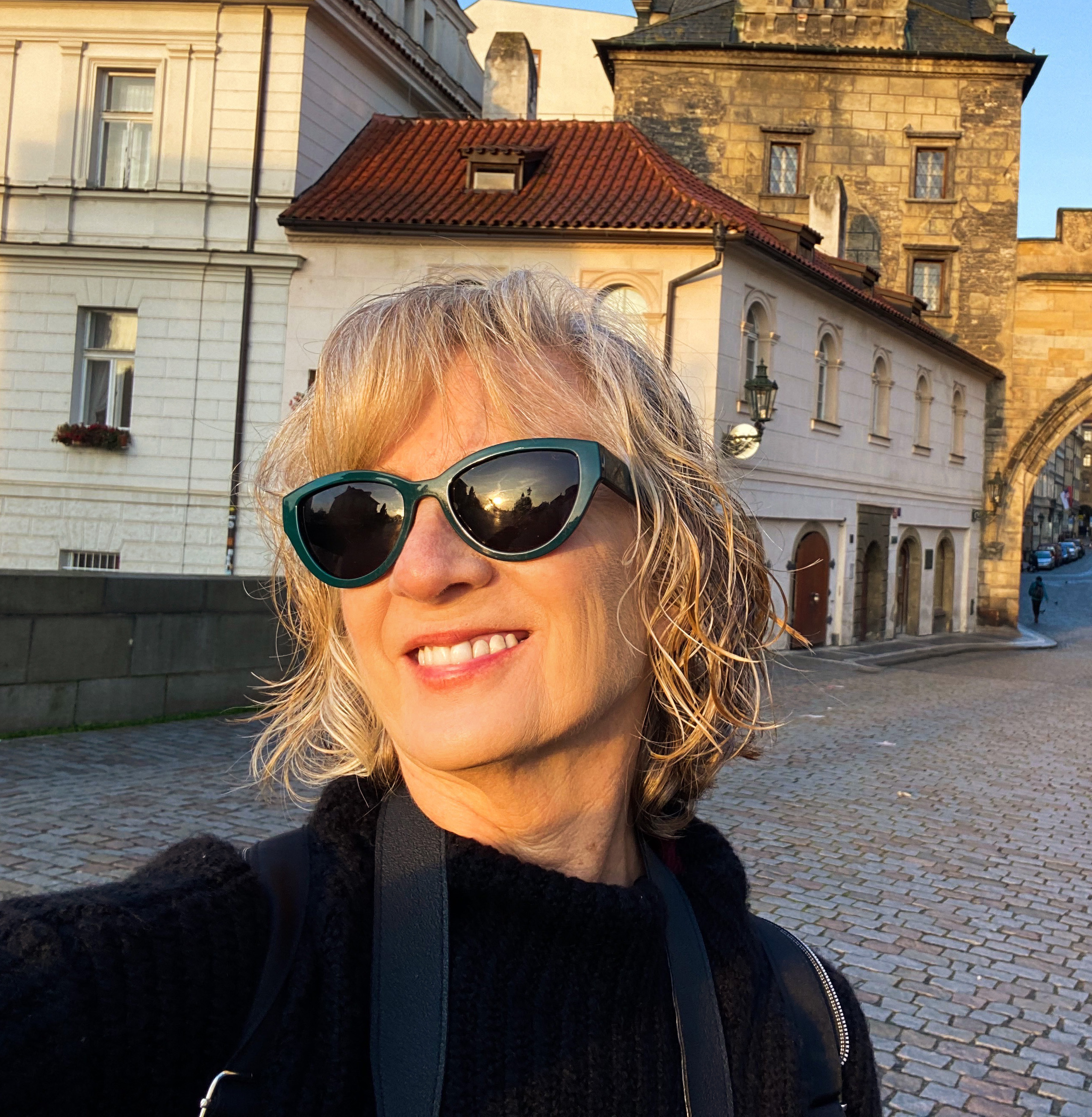
- Peacock in 2024
- Occupation: Photographer
- Notable work: Hometown; American Bedroom

Barbara Peacock is an American photographer. She has published the books Hometown (2016) and American Bedroom (2023).

== Early life and education ==
Peacock grew up in Westford, Massachusetts. She studied fine arts at Boston University College of Fine Arts, and photography and filmmaking at the School of the Museum of Fine Arts at Tufts, also in Boston.

== Work ==
Hometown is a 33-year project that documents the small-town people and events of Westford, Massachusetts.

American Bedroom is a series of portraits of people in their bedrooms, as well as personal statements from them. The work is about the "complexities and idiosyncrasies of contemporary American life." Looking for a cross-section of people from all walks of life, Peacock photographed about 400 people in every region of the United States, between 2016 and 2023. The book is broken down into five sections by geographic region.

== Personal life ==
As of 2016 she lived in Portland, Maine.

== Publications ==
- Hometown: 1982–2016. Brooklyn, NY: Bazan Photos, 2016. ISBN 978-0-692-63952-8.
- American Bedroom: Reflections on the Nature of Life. Heidelberg, Germany: Kehrer, 2023. ISBN 978-3969001295.

== Awards ==
- 2016: LensCulture Portrait Award
- 2017: One of five winners of the $10,000 Getty Images Grant for Editorial Photography for American Bedroom
- 2018: LensCulture Emerging Talent Award
- 2022: One of seven winners, of the $5,000 Women Photograph Project Grant for American Bedroom
- 2022: LensCulture Finalist, Portraits
- 2023: Griffin Museum of Photography Arthur Griffin Legacy Award
- 2024: FEP European Photo Book Award
