= Lina Geoushy =

Egyptian photographer

Lina Geoushy (ﻟﻳﻨﺎ ﺠﻳﻮﺸﻲ; born 1990) is an Egyptian photographer and visual artist. Her work explores sociopolitics, gender politics, and women empowerment. Her work is a response to the Egyptian MeToo movement.

== Education ==
Geoushy completed her MA Photojournalism & Documentary Photography at University of the Arts, London. She studied at the London College of Communication in Elephant & Castle and graduated with distinction early 2022. She studied Business, Communications, and Psychology at The American University in Cairo, graduated with honors, and received her Bachelor's degree in 2011.

== Career ==
Her projects include Shame Less: A Protest Against Sexual Violence, Breadwinners, Cleopatras Scoring Change, and Trailblazers. Her awards include the 2022 Female In focus Award from The British Journal of Photography, 2022 Foam Talent, and 2019 Documentary Photographer of The Year from The Royal Photographic Society. In 2021, Geoushy started working on a project on Egyptian womanhoods and photographic representation with Beyn Collective funded by L'Art Rue. In 2022, she had her first solo exhibition at Landskrona Foto curated by Monica Allende.

== Awards ==
- 2022: Female In Focus Series Winner, British Journal of Photography
- 2022: FOAM Talent
- 2022: OD Photo Prize (Judge’s Pick) by Autograph curator, Bindi Vora, Open Doors Gallery
- 2022: Carte Blanche Finalist, Paris Photo
- 2021: Photography+ The Graduate Issue 2021, Photoworks
- 2021: Against All Odds Grantee, Malala Fund X British Journal of Photography 1854 Media
- 2021: International Photography Exhibition 163, The Royal Photographic Society
- 2021: Portrait Series Winner 2021 (2nd Place), Lens Culture
- 2020: GUP New Talent
- 2019: Documentary Photographer of The Year, The Royal Photographic Society'
- 2019: Winner AAFxPHmuseum Prize, PHmuseum
- 2019: AOP Awards Finalist
