= Molecule of the Month =

- Available in: English
- Creators: Henry Rzepa; Karl Harrison; Paul May
- Website: www.chm.bris.ac.uk/motm/motm.htm
- Launched: January 1996; 30 years ago

The Molecule of the Month (MOTM) is a website launched in 1996 by Henry Rzepa of the Imperial College London, Karl Harrison of the University of Oxford, and Paul May of the University of Bristol. Each month since January 1996, a new molecule has been added to the list on the page, making it one of the longest-running chemistry websites on the internet.
