= Stella Johnson (photographer) =

American photographer

Stella Johnson (born 1953) is an American photographer.

Her work is included in the collection of the Museum of Fine Arts Houston, and the Portland Art Museum.
