= Wellcome Photography Prize =

The Wellcome Photography Prize is an annual photography competition organised by the Wellcome Trust. It was established in 1997 as the Wellcome Image Awards, for science image making. It was renamed in a revamp and expansion in 2018.

== Winners ==
=== Wellcome Image Awards 2016 ===
20 winners

=== Wellcome Image Awards 2017 ===
22 winners

=== Wellcome Photography Prize 2019 ===
- Overall winner: Erin Lefevre
- Social Perspectives: Erin Lefevre
- Outbreaks: David Chancellor
- Medicine in Focus: Dmitry Kostyukov
- Hidden Worlds: Simone Cerio

=== Wellcome Photography Prize 2020 ===
- Overall winner: Arseniy Neskhodimov
- Mental Health (series): Arseniy Neskhodimov
- The Social Perspectives: Marijn Fidder
- Hidden Worlds: Jenevieve Aken
- Medicine in Focus: Julia Gunther and Sophia Mohammed
- Mental Health (single image): Benji Reid

=== Wellcome Photography Prize 2021 ===
- Overall single image winner (a £10,000 prize): Jameisha Prescod
- Overall series winner (a £10,000 prize): Yoppy Pieter
- Managing Mental Health
  - Single image: Jameisha Prescod
  - Series: Morteza Niknahad
- Fighting Infections
  - Single image: Aly Song
  - Series: Yoppy Pieter
- Health in a Heating World
  - Single image: Zakir Hossain Chowdhury
  - Series: Hashem Shakeri

=== Wellcome Photography Prize 2025 ===
- Striking Solo Photography: Mithail Afrige Chowdhury, Urban Travel
- The Marvels of Scientific and Medical Imaging: Steve Gschmeissner, Cholesterol in the Liver
- A Storytelling Series: Sujata Setia, A Thousand Cuts

== See also ==
- List of photography awards
